= 2026–27 Georgia Southern Eagles women's basketball team =

American college basketball season

2026–27 Georgia Southern Eagles women's basketball
- Conference: Sun Belt Conference
- Record: 0–0 (0–0 Sun Belt)
- Head coach: Heather Macy (1st season)
- Assistant coaches: Butch Estes; Jasmin Coleman; Donna Carr
- Home arena: Hill Convocation Center

2026–27 Sun Belt Conference women's basketball standings
	Conf.				Overall
Team	W		L	PCT	W		L	PCT
Appalachian State	0	–	0	–	0	–	0	–
Arkansas State	0	–	0	–	0	–	0	–
Coastal Carolina	0	–	0	–	0	–	0	–
Georgia Southern	0	–	0	–	0	–	0	–
Georgia State	0	–	0	–	0	–	0	–
James Madison	0	–	0	–	0	–	0	–
Louisiana	0	–	0	–	0	–	0	–
Louisiana–Monroe	0	–	0	–	0	–	0	–
Louisiana Tech	0	–	0	–	0	–	0	–
Marshall	0	–	0	–	0	–	0	–
Old Dominion	0	–	0	–	0	–	0	–
South Alabama	0	–	0	–	0	–	0	–
Southern Miss	0	–	0	–	0	–	0	–
Troy	0	–	0	–	0	–	0	–
† 2027 Sun Belt tournament winner

The 2026–27 Georgia Southern Eagles women's basketball team will represent Georgia Southern University during the 2026–27 NCAA Division I women's basketball season. The Eagles, led by first-year head coach Heather Macy, will play their home games at the Hill Convocation Center in Statesboro, Georgia and compete as a member of the Sun Belt Conference.

== Previous season ==
The Eagles finished the 2025–26 season 23–8 overall and 16–2 in Sun Belt play, to finish as regular season champions for the first time in program history, and their first since 2001 when they won the Southland Conference regular season title. The Eagles' 23 wins was also the most in a season since that year, where they finished 26–5.

As the top seed in the Sun Belt tournament, the Eagles later earned a bye to the semifinals, where they suffered a major upset as they lost 53–81 to No. 4 James Madison in what was the largest point margin of the tournament.

As regular season champions who did not win their conference tournament, the Eagles earned an automatic bid to the WBIT, their first appearance in the tournament, where they were unseeded in the Utah Bracket. They lost in the first round to No. 2 seeded Miami (FL).

On March 26, head coach Hana Haden was announced as the new head coach at Memphis, ending her time with the Eagles after two seasons. On April 3, Nova Southeastern head coach Heather Macy was named as the new head coach for Georgia Southern. In the 2025–26 season, Macy led the Sharks to a 29–5 record and their first conference title in 11 seasons, as well as their fourth consecutive Division II NCAA tournament appearance.

== Offseason ==
=== Departures ===
Georgia Southern departures
Name	Number	Pos.	Height	Year	Hometown	Reason for departure
Destiny Garrett	0	Guard	5'4"	Graduate student	Bessemer, AL	Graduated
Shanti Simmons	4	Guard	5'9"	Graduate student	Eatonton, GA	Graduated
Liv Fuller	12	Forward	5'10"	Junior	Clearwater, FL	TBD; not listed on roster
Courtenay Lee	13	Center	6'4"	Junior	Mesa, AZ	Transferred to Southeast Missouri State
Armani Cooke	15	Guard	5'9"	Junior	Statesboro, GA	Walk-on; TBD, not listed on roster
Destini Ward	22	Guard	5'8"	(redshirt) Junior	Baltimore, MD	Transferred to Louisiana–Monroe
McKayla Hosley	23	Forward	6'0"	Freshman	Columbus, GA	Transferred to Longwood
Kishyah Anderson	24	Guard/Forward	5'10"	Senior	Phoenix, AZ	Graduated
McKenna Eddings	30	Guard	6'0"	5th year	Williamsburg, VA	Exhausted eligibility

=== Incoming transfers ===
Georgia Southern incoming transfers
Name	Number	Pos.	Height	Year	Hometown	Previous school
Tamiria Jones	1	Guard	5'9"	Junior	Birmingham, AL	Chipola (NJCAA)
Kyra Perkins	2	Guard	5'10"	Senior	Morrison, TN	Austin Peay
Unique Horton	4	Forward	6'3"	Junior	Miami, FL	Nova Southeastern (D-II)
Kiyah Lewis	11	Guard/Forward	6'0"	Sophomore	Fredericksburg, VA	Central Connecticut
Markayla Holland	14	Guard	5'10"	Graduate student	Waterford, MI	Nova Southeastern (D-II)
Hailey Chiles	33	Center	6'3"	Senior	Greenwood, SC	Nova Southeastern (D-II)

=== Recruiting class ===
There was no 2026 recruiting class.

== Roster ==
2026–27 Georgia Southern Eagles women's basketball team
Players
Coaches

Pos.	#	Name	Height	Year	Previous school	Hometown
F	0	Jailyn Williams	6 ft 0 in (1.83 m)	Fr	St. Lucie West Centennial High School	Port St. Lucie, FL
G	1	Tamiria Jones	5 ft 9 in (1.75 m)	Jr	Huffman High School; Chipola College	Birmingham, AL
G	2	Kyra Perkins	5 ft 10 in (1.78 m)	Sr	Warren County High School; Austin Peay	Morrison, TN
G	3	Nevaeh Brown	5 ft 10 in (1.78 m)	Jr	Old Mill High School; Paris Junior College	Columbia, MD
F	4	Unique Horton	6 ft 3 in (1.91 m)	Jr	Miami Southridge Senior High School; Nova Southeastern	Miami, FL
G	5	Kyla Bryant	5 ft 7 in (1.7 m)	Sr	Salisbury High School; North Carolina Central	Salisbury, NC
G/F	10	Jamiria Jones	5 ft 9 in (1.75 m)	Jr	Huffman High School	Birmingham, AL
G/F	11	Kiyah Lewis	6 ft 0 in (1.83 m)	So	James Monroe High School; Central Connecticut	Fredericksburg, VA
G	14	Markayla Holland	5 ft 10 in (1.78 m)	GS	Waterford Kettering High School; Nova Southeastern	Waterford, MI
G	15	Kiara Anderson	5 ft 5 in (1.65 m)	Fr	Mallard Creek High School	Denver, NC
F	20	Lia Anderson	6 ft 1 in (1.85 m)	Sr	Hillside High School; Wingate	LaPlace, LA
F	23	Laney Scoggins	5 ft 11 in (1.8 m)	Sr	John T. Hoggard High School; Presbyterian	Leland, NC
C	33	Hailey Chiles	6 ft 3 in (1.91 m)	Sr	Waterford Kettering High School; Nova Southeastern	Waterford, MI
F	41	Kayla Cleaveland	6 ft 0 in (1.83 m)	Fr	River Ridge High School	Woodstock, Georgia

Head coach

- Heather Macy (Greensboro)

Assistant coach(es)

- Butch Estes (North Carolina)
- Jasmin Coleman (Jacksonville)
- Dee Anderson (Florida)

Legend

- (C) Team captain
- (S) Suspended
- (I) Ineligible
- (W) Walk-on
- Injured
- Current redshirt

Roster
Last update: August 24, 2026

== Schedule and results ==
Date time, TV	Rank^{#}	Opponent^{#}	Result	Record	High points	High rebounds	High assists	Site (attendance) city, state
Regular season
November 2, 2026*; TBA		at Bowling Green; MAC–SBC Challenge						Stroh Center; Bowling Green, KY
November 5, 2026*; 7:00 p.m.		at Mercer						Hawkins Arena; Macon, GA
November 9, 2026*; 6:00 p.m.		Savannah State						Hill Convocation Center; Statesboro, GA
November 14, 2026*; 11:00 a.m.		Wofford						Hill Convocation Center; Statesboro, GA
November 17, 2026*; 5:00 p.m.		Coastal Georgia						Hill Convocation Center; Statesboro, GA
November 20, 2026*; 6:00 p.m.		Florida Gulf Coast						Hill Convocation Center; Statesboro, GA
November 24, 2026*; 3:00 p.m.		at Cleveland State; Cleveland State Tournament						Wolstein Center; Cleveland, OH
November 25, 2026*; 12:00 p.m.		vs. Western Michigan; Cleveland State Tournament						Wolstein Center; Cleveland, OH
November 29, 2026*; TBA		at Furman						Timmons Arena; Greenville, SC
December 7, 2026*; 11:00 a.m.		Charleston Southern						Hanner Fieldhouse; Statesboro, GA
December 12, 2026*; 1:00 p.m.		FIU						Hill Convocation Center; Statesboro, GA
December 15, 2026*; 6:00 p.m.		Charleston						Hill Convocation Center; Statesboro, GA
December 19, 2026; 2:00 p.m.		Arkansas State						Hill Convocation Center; Statesboro, GA
December 22, 2026; 12:00 p.m.		at James Madison						Atlantic Union Bank Center; Harrisonburg, VA
December 28, 2026*; TBA		at Georgia						Stegeman Coliseum; Athens, GA
December 31, 2026; 7:00 p.m.		at Louisiana						Cajundome; Lafayette, LA
January 2, 2027; TBA		at Southern Miss						Reed Green Coliseum; Hattiesburg, MS
January 6, 2027; 6:00 p.m.		South Alabama						Hill Convocation Center; Statesboro, GA
January 9, 2027; 2:00 p.m.		Troy						Hill Convocation Center; Statesboro, GA
January 16, 2027; TBA		at Louisiana Tech						Thomas Assembly Center; Ruston, LA
January 20, 2027; 6:00 p.m.		Marshall						Hill Convocation Center; Statesboro, GA
January 23, 2027; 2:00 p.m.		Coastal Carolina						Hill Convocation Center; Statesboro, GA
January 28, 2027; 6:30 p.m.		at Appalachian State						Holmes Center; Boone, NC
January 30, 2027; TBA		at Georgia State; Rivalry						GSU Convocation Center; Atlanta, GA
February 3, 2027; TBA		at Marshall						Cam Henderson Center; Huntington, WV
February 6, 2027*; 2:00 p.m.		TBA; MAC–SBC Challenge						Hill Convocation Center; Statesboro, GA
February 10, 2027; 6:00 p.m.		TBA						Hill Convocation Center; Statesboro, GA
February 13, 2027; 2:00 p.m.		TBA						Hill Convocation Center; Statesboro, GA
February 18, 2027; TBA		at Old Dominion						Chartway Arena; Norfolk, VA
February 20, 2027; 1:00 p.m.		at Coastal Carolina						HTC Center; Conway, SC
February 23, 2027; 6:00 p.m.		Appalachian State						Hill Convocation Center; Statesboro, GA
February 26, 2027; 5:00 p.m.		Old Dominion						Hill Convocation Center; Statesboro, GA
Sun Belt tournament
March 2–8, 2027; TBA		vs.						Pensacola Bay Center; Pensacola, FL
*Non-conference game. ^{#}Rankings from AP Poll. (#) Tournament seedings in parentheses. All times are in Eastern.
