= 2026–27 Georgia State Panthers women's basketball team =

Intercollegiate basketball season

2026–27 Georgia State Panthers women's basketball
- Conference: Sun Belt Conference
- Record: 1–4 (0–0 Sun Belt)
- Head coach: Marcilina Grayer (1st season)
- Assistant coaches: Necole Sterling (1st season); Karina Brandon (1st season); Oscar Bellfield (1st season); Isaiah Dowling (1st season)
- Home arena: GSU Convocation Center

2026–27 Sun Belt Conference women's basketball standings
	Conf.				Overall
Team	W		L	PCT	W		L	PCT
Louisiana Tech	0	–	0	–	4	–	1	.800
Marshall	0	–	0	–	4	–	1	.800
Appalachian State	0	–	0	–	3	–	1	.750
Coastal Carolina	0	–	0	–	3	–	1	.750
Southern Miss	0	–	0	–	3	–	1	.750
James Madison	0	–	0	–	3	–	2	.600
Old Dominion	0	–	0	–	3	–	2	.600
Georgia Southern	0	–	0	–	2	–	2	.500
Troy	0	–	0	–	2	–	2	.500
Louisiana	0	–	0	–	1	–	2	.333
Louisiana–Monroe	0	–	0	–	1	–	2	.333
Georgia State	0	–	0	–	1	–	4	.200
South Alabama	0	–	0	–	1	–	4	.200
Arkansas State	0	–	0	–	0	–	3	.000
† 2027 Sun Belt tournament winner As of November 17, 2026

The 2026–27 Georgia State Panthers women's basketball team represents Georgia State University during the 2026-27 NCAA Division I women's basketball season. The Panthers compete in the Sun Belt Conference and are led by first-year head coach Marcilina Grayer. They play their home games at the GSU Convocation Center in Atlanta, Georgia.

== Previous season ==
The Panthers finished the 2025-26 season 10–21, 5–13 in Sun Belt play, to tie for 11th place.

== Preseason ==
Entering the 2026–27 season, Georgia State was undergoing a major roster transition following a 10–21 campaign in 2025–26. Marcilina Grayer was appointed head coach in April 2026, replacing Gene Hill, who resigned in March. The Panthers returned sophomore guard Grace Lanier and junior guard Frankee Payne, while adding 11 newcomers, including nine transfers and two freshmen. Among the departing players was Crystal Henderson, the team's leading scorer in 2025-26, who transferred to Texas State after averaging 16.6 points per game and earning Third Team All-Sun Belt honors. In its preseason conference preview, Basket Under Review characterized Georgia State as undergoing a significant rebuilding process, noting the team's substantial roster turnover and limited returning production. The publication projected a challenging first season for Grayer as she began rebuilding the program.

== Roster ==
2026–27 Georgia State Panthers women's basketball team
Players
Coaches

Pos.	#	Name	Height	Year	Previous school	Hometown
F	0	Jada Collins	6 ft 0 in (1.83 m)	Jr	Coppin State	Kalamazoo, Michigan
G	1	Nikole Thomas	5 ft 9 in (1.75 m)	RS Jr	Missouri-Kansas City	Memphis, Tennessee
G	2	Makennah Alexis	5 ft 7 in (1.7 m)	Fr	Cypress Lakes	Waller, Texas
G	4	Kenaya Klintman	5 ft 10 in (1.78 m)	Jr	High Point	Malmö, Sweden
G	7	Danaeja Romero Ah Sam	5 ft 8 in (1.73 m)	Jr	Eastern Arizona College	Springfield, Oregon
G	10	Aaliyah Baldwin	5 ft 4 in (1.63 m)	So	Snow College	Draper, Utah
G	11	Dawson Jemerson	5 ft 5 in (1.65 m)	RS So	Coastal Carolina	DeSoto, Texas
G	13	Aikaterini Yfantopoulou	5 ft 11 in (1.8 m)	Fr	Panathinaikos A.C. (GRE)	Athens, Greece
G	22	Ana Oliveira Dias	5 ft 6 in (1.68 m)	Sr	Missouri Western State	São Paulo, Brazil
F	25	Mariah Knight	6 ft 0 in (1.83 m)	Jr	Jacksonville	Louisville, Kentucky
G	33	Frankee Payne	5 ft 3 in (1.6 m)	Jr	South Gwinnett High School	Snellville, Georgia
F	35	Aryelle Stevens	6 ft 0 in (1.83 m)	GS	Marquette	Pearland, Texas
G	42	Grace Lanier	5 ft 4 in (1.63 m)	So	Xaverian High School	New York, New York

Head coach

Marcilina Grayer

Assistant coach(es)

Legend

- (C) Team captain
- (S) Suspended
- (I) Ineligible
- (W) Walk-on
- Injured
- Current redshirt
