= 2026–27 Coastal Carolina Chanticleers women's basketball team =

American college basketball season

2026–27 Coastal Carolina Chanticleers women's basketball
- Conference: Sun Belt Conference
- Record: 3–2 (0–0 Sun Belt)
- Head coach: Kevin Pederson (5th season)
- Associate head coach: DeCole Shoemate Robertson
- Assistant coaches: Darius Carter; Tatum Burstrom; Dennis Cox
- Home arena: HTC Center

2026–27 Sun Belt Conference women's basketball standings
	Conf.				Overall
Team	W		L	PCT	W		L	PCT
Louisiana Tech	0	–	0	–	5	–	1	.833
Marshall	0	–	0	–	5	–	1	.833
Southern Miss	0	–	0	–	5	–	1	.833
Appalachian State	0	–	0	–	3	–	1	.750
Coastal Carolina	0	–	0	–	3	–	2	.600
Georgia Southern	0	–	0	–	3	–	2	.600
James Madison	0	–	0	–	3	–	2	.600
Old Dominion	0	–	0	–	3	–	2	.600
Troy	0	–	0	–	2	–	3	.400
Arkansas State	0	–	0	–	1	–	3	.250
Louisiana	0	–	0	–	1	–	3	.250
Louisiana–Monroe	0	–	0	–	1	–	3	.250
Georgia State	0	–	0	–	1	–	4	.200
South Alabama	0	–	0	–	1	–	4	.200
† 2027 Sun Belt tournament winner As of November 19, 2026

The 2026–27 Coastal Carolina Chanticleers women's basketball team currently represents Coastal Carolina University during the 2026–27 NCAA Division I women's basketball season. The Chanticleers, led by fifth-year head coach Kevin Pederson, play their home games at the HTC Center in Conway, South Carolina, and compete as a member of the Sun Belt Conference.

== Previous season ==
The Chanticleers finished the 2025–26 season 14–18 overall and 7–11 in Sun Belt play, to finish in a tie for eighth place in the conference with Texas State and Louisiana–Monroe. As the No. 9 seed in the Sun Belt tournament, they lost 70–80 in the second round to No. 12 South Alabama.

The game drew attention due to a brawl involving both teams with under six minutes left in the fourth quarter, involving Tracy Hueston and South Alabama player Cordeisia Harris. Eight players were ejected, and a referee was knocked to the floor, who required medical attention. Hueston was suspended for the rest of the season.

== Offseason ==
=== Departures ===
Coastal Carolina departures
Name	Num.	Pos.	Height	Year	Hometown	Reason for departure
Hennessey Luu-Brown	0	Guard	5'7"	Graduate student	Toronto, Ontario	Graduated
J'yana Salton	3	Guard	5'8"	Junior	Charlotte, NC	Transferred to Southern
Kristin Williams	5	Guard	5'8"	Graduate student	San Diego, CA	Graduated
Paige Bradley	7	Guard	5'10"	5th year	Dallas, TX	Exhausted eligibility
Dawson Jemmerson	11	Guard	5'5"	Sophomore	DeSoto, TX	Transferred to Georgia State (Note: Did not play in the 2025–26 season.)
Tracy Hueston	13	Forward	6'2"	5th year	Roanoke, VA	Exhausted eligibility
Kinsea Grimes	17	Forward	6'0"	Freshman	Mansfield, TX	Transferred to SMU

=== Incoming transfers ===
Coastal Carolina incoming transfers
Name	Num.	Pos.	Height	Year	Hometown	Previous school
Anja Djukic	8	Guard	5'5"	(redshirt) Junior	Paracin, Serbia	Weatherford (NJCAA)
Kamryn Kitchen	11	Guard	5'9"	(redshirt) Sophomore	Charlotte, NC	Arizona
Caroline Mullins	32	Guard	5'10"	Junior	Jasper, GA	UVA Wise (D-II)
Grace Lesko	44	Forward	6'2"	(redshirt) Junior	Northampton, PA	Mercy (D-II)

=== Recruiting class ===
There was no 2026 recruiting class.

== Roster ==
2026–27 Coastal Carolina Chanticleers women's basketball team
Players
Coaches

Pos.	#	Name	Height	Year	Previous school	Hometown
G	0	Audrey Boyer	6 ft 0 in (1.83 m)	Fr	Tocoi Creek High School	St. Augustine, FL
G	1	Baylee Lowder	5 ft 10 in (1.78 m)	So	Grantsville High School	Tooele, UT
F	2	Tessa Grady	6 ft 2 in (1.88 m)	RS Jr	Dublin Coffman High School; Wisconsin	Dublin, OH
G	3	Asia Patin	5 ft 7 in (1.7 m)	Fr	Southern Lab School	Slaughter, LA
G	4	Ar'Nayshia Griffin	6 ft 0 in (1.83 m)	Fr	Leesburg High School	Starke, FL
G	8	Anja Djukic	5 ft 5 in (1.65 m)	RS Jr	Gymnasium Paracin; Weatherford College	Paracin, Serbia
G	11	Kamryn Kitchen	5 ft 9 in (1.75 m)	RS So	Independence High School; Arizona	Charlotte, NC
G	12	Olivia Klanac	5 ft 9 in (1.75 m)	So	Medina High School	Medina, OH
F	15	Tateyoina Harris	5 ft 10 in (1.78 m)	Sr	Camden High School; Mars Hill	Camden, SC
G	23	D'Yanis Jimenez	5 ft 8 in (1.73 m)	Sr	Charlotte High School; Wisconsin	Cape Coral, FL
G	32	Caroline Mullins	5 ft 10 in (1.78 m)	Jr	Pickens High School; UVA Wise	Jasper, GA
F	44	Grace Lesko	6 ft 2 in (1.88 m)	RS Jr	Northampton Area High School; Mercy	Northampton, PA

Head coach

- Kevin Pederson (Clemson)

Assistant coach(es)

- DeCole Shoemate Robertson (Liberty)
- Darius Carter (Tusculum)
- Tatum Burstrom (Carson–Newman)
- Dennis Cox (Central Florida)

Legend

- (C) Team captain
- (S) Suspended
- (I) Ineligible
- (W) Walk-on
- Injured
- Current redshirt

Roster
Last update: August 26, 2026

== Schedule and results ==
Date time, TV	Rank^{#}	Opponent^{#}	Result	Record	High points	High rebounds	High assists	Site (attendance) city, state
Regular season
November 2, 2026*; 11:00 a.m., ESPN+		at Western Michigan; MAC–SBC Challenge	W 68–54	1–0	19 – Klanac	9 – Lowder	5 – Djukic	University Arena (1,547); Kalamazoo, MI
November 5, 2026*; 12:00 p.m., ESPN+		Johnson	W 103–54	2–0	21 – Klanac	10 – Mullins	7 – Djukic	HTC Center (757); Conway, SC
November 11, 2026*; 6:00 p.m., ESPN+		Jacksonville	W 89–78	3–0	24 – Klanac	7 – Tied	3 – Tied	HTC Center (862); Conway, SC
November 15, 2026*; 2:00 p.m., ESPN+		at East Tennessee State	L 52–61	3–1	14 – Kitchen	8 – Harris	2 – Mullins	Brooks Gymnasium (682); Johnson City, TN
November 18, 2026*; 7:00 p.m., B1G+		at Indiana	L 65–90	3–2	31 – Klanac	6 – Lowder	3 – Djukic	Simon Skjodt Assembly Hall (5,976); Bloomington, IN
November 22, 2026*; 3:00 p.m., ACCN		at NC State						Reynolds Coliseum; Raleigh, NC
November 25, 2026*; 1:00 p.m., ESPN+		Newberry						HTC Center; Conway, SC
November 29, 2026*; TBA		at Campbell						Gore Arena; Buies Creek, NC
December 2, 2026*; TBA		East Carolina						HTC Center; Conway, SC
December 6, 2026*; TBA		UNC Wilmington						HTC Center; Conway, SC
December 12, 2026*; TBA		at Charleston						TD Arena; Charleston, SC
December 16, 2026; 6:00 p.m.		Georgia State						HTC Center; Conway, SC
December 19, 2026; TBA		at Louisiana						Cajundome; Lafayette, LA
December 21, 2026*; TBA		at Alabama						Coleman Coliseum; Tuscaloosa, AL
December 31, 2026; TBA		at Louisiana Tech						Thomas Assembly Center; Ruston, LA
January 2, 2027; TBA		at Louisiana–Monroe						b1Bank Fant Coliseum; Monroe, LA
January 6, 2026; TBA		Troy						HTC Center; Conway, SC
January 9, 2026; 1:00 p.m.		Southern Miss						HTC Center; Conway, SC
January 13, 2026; 6:00 p.m.		James Madison						HTC Center; Conway, SC
January 16, 2026; 1:00 p.m.		Old Dominion						HTC Center; Conway, SC
January 20, 2026; 6:00 p.m.		Georgia State						GSU Convocation Center; Atlanta, GA
January 23, 2026; 1:00 p.m.		at Georgia Southern						Hill Convocation Center; Statesboro, GA
January 30, 2026; 1:00 p.m.		South Alabama						HTC Center; Conway, SC
February 3, 2026; 6:00 p.m.		Appalachian State						HTC Center; Conway, SC
February 6, 2026*; 1:00 p.m.		TBD; MAC–SBC Challenge						HTC Center; Conway, SC
February 10, 2026; 11:00 a.m.		at Old Dominion						Chartway Arena; Norfolk, VA
February 13, 2026; 1:00 p.m.		at Appalachian State						Holmes Center; Boone, NC
February 18, 2026; 6:00 p.m.		Marshall						HTC Center; Conway, SC
February 20, 2026; 1:00 p.m.		Georgia Southern						HTC Center; Conway, SC
February 23, 2026; 6:00 p.m.		at James Madison						Atlantic Union Bank Center; Harrisonburg, VA
February 26, 2026; 6:00 p.m.		at Marshall						Cam Henderson Center; Huntington, WV
Sun Belt tournament
March 2–8, 2027; TBA		vs.						Pensacola Bay Center; Pensacola, FL
*Non-conference game. ^{#}Rankings from AP Poll. (#) Tournament seedings in parentheses. All times are in Eastern.
