= 2026–27 Louisiana–Monroe Warhawks women's basketball team =

American college basketball season

2026–27 Louisiana–Monroe Warhawks women's basketball
- Conference: Sun Belt Conference
- Record: 0–0 (0–0 Sun Belt)
- Head coach: Scotty Fletcher (2nd season)
- Associate head coach: Mendy McNeese
- Assistant coaches: Nikolas Quezada; Chastadie Barrs; William Marchino Jr.
- Home arena: b1Bank Fant Coliseum

2026–27 Sun Belt Conference women's basketball standings
	Conf.				Overall
Team	W		L	PCT	W		L	PCT
Appalachian State	0	–	0	–	0	–	0	–
Arkansas State	0	–	0	–	0	–	0	–
Coastal Carolina	0	–	0	–	0	–	0	–
Georgia Southern	0	–	0	–	0	–	0	–
Georgia State	0	–	0	–	0	–	0	–
James Madison	0	–	0	–	0	–	0	–
Louisiana	0	–	0	–	0	–	0	–
Louisiana–Monroe	0	–	0	–	0	–	0	–
Louisiana Tech	0	–	0	–	0	–	0	–
Marshall	0	–	0	–	0	–	0	–
Old Dominion	0	–	0	–	0	–	0	–
South Alabama	0	–	0	–	0	–	0	–
Southern Miss	0	–	0	–	0	–	0	–
Troy	0	–	0	–	0	–	0	–
† 2027 Sun Belt tournament winner

The 2026–27 Louisiana–Monroe Warhawks women's basketball team will represent the University of Louisiana at Monroe during the 2026–27 NCAA Division I women's basketball season. The Warhawks, led by second-year head coach Scotty Fletcher, will play their home games at the b1Bank Fant Coliseum in Monroe, Louisiana, and compete as a member of the Sun Belt Conference.

== Previous season ==
The Warhawks finished the 2025–26 season 17–16 overall and 7–11 in Sun Belt play, to finish in a three-way tie for eighth in the conference with Texas State and Coastal Carolina. As the No. 10 seed in the Sun Belt tournament, they defeated No. 14 Louisiana and No. 7 Southern Miss in the second and third rounds respectively. They then went on to upset No. 6 Old Dominion 68–67 in the fourth round to advance to the quarterfinals, thanks to a game-winning two-pointer from guard Marissa Gasaway with eight seconds left. They would then lose in the quarterfinals to No. 3 Arkansas State to end their season.

== Offseason ==
=== Departures ===
Louisiana–Monroe departures
Name	Number	Pos.	Height	Year	Hometown	Reason for departure
Jazmine Jackson	0	Guard	5'8"	(redshirt) Junior	Jacksonville, FL	Graduated
Vanessa Schwarzmann	1	Guard	5'9"	Graduate Student	Upper Marlboro, MD	Graduated
Marissa Gasaway	2	Forward	5'11"	Graduate Student	Louisville, KY	Graduated
Nailea Nichols	3	Forward	6'0"	Senior	Fresno, CA	Graduated
J'Mani Ingram	7	Guard	5'7"	Graduate Student	North Augusta, SC	Graduated
Kamille Brown	9	Guard	5'8"	Junior	Conway, AR	Transferred to Western Kentucky
Keshunti Nichols	11	Forward	6'0"	Graduate Student	Pearl, MS	Graduated
Abby Leahy	13	Guard	6'1"	Junior	Colorado Springs, CO	Entered transfer portal
Katelyn Chomko	15	Guard	5'7"	Senior	Houston, TX	Graduated
Asjah Inniss	24	Guard	5'9"	Graduate Student	Suwanee, GA	Graduated
Marcavia Shavers	25	Center	6'2"	Graduate Student	Biloxi, MS	Graduated
Asia Barclay	35	Forward	6'0"	Graduate Student	Anniston, AL	Graduated
Nakiyah Mays-Prince	44	Guard	5'5"	Senior	Chicago, IL	Graduated

=== Incoming transfers ===
Louisiana–Monroe incoming transfers
Name	Number	Pos.	Height	Year	Hometown	Previous school
Erin Henry	0	Guard	5'8"	Senior	Joliet, IL	Coppin State
Lea Nadolny	1	Guard	5'8"	Sophomore	Montreuil, France	Southern Idaho (NJCAA)
Nevaeh Scott	2	Guard	5'6"	Senior	Memphis, TN	Old Dominion
Aiyanna Culver	3	Guard	5'3"	Junior	Queens, NY	Chicago State
Chardel Terrell	5	Guard	5'8"	Sophomore	Houston, TX	Murray State College (NJCAA)
Kylee Hunt	6	Guard	5'6"	5th Year	Oklahoma City, OK	Northern Kentucky
Summer Faleafa	7	Forward	6'1"	Junior	Auckland, New Zealand	North Idaho (NJCAA)
Kayla Lindsey	9	Guard	5'9"	Senior	Norcross, GA	Mount St. Mary's
Kyla McBride	11	Forward	6'0"	Senior	Magnolia, AR	Texas State
Nuria Mucongo	12	Forward	6'3"	Junior	Luanda, Angola	Clarendon (NJCAA)
Destini Ward	24	Guard	5'8"	5th Year	Baltimore, MD	Georgia Southern
Amari Williams	34	Forward	6'1"	Sophomore	Oklahoma City, OK	Presbyterian

=== Recruiting class ===
There was no 2026 recruiting class.

== Roster ==
Years are listed according to the new NCAA age-based eligibility model.

2026–27 Louisiana–Monroe Warhawks women's basketball team
Players
Coaches

Pos.	#	Name	Height	Year	Previous school	Hometown
G	0	Erin Henry	5 ft 8 in (1.73 m)	Sr	Example Academy; Coppin State	Joliet, IL
G	1	Lea Nadolny	5 ft 8 in (1.73 m)	So	College of Southern Idaho	Montreuil, France
G	2	Nevaeh Scott	5 ft 6 in (1.68 m)	Sr	Bartlett High School; Coppin State	Memphis, TN
G	3	Aiyanna Culver	5 ft 3 in (1.6 m)	Jr	Christ the King Regional High School; Chicago State	Memphis, TN
G	5	Chardel Terrell	5 ft 8 in (1.73 m)	So	Clear Brook High School; Murray State College	Houston, TX
G	6	Kylee Hunt (5th)	5 ft 6 in (1.68 m)	Sr	Choctaw High School; Northern Kentucky	Oklahoma City, OK
F	7	Summer Faleafa	6 ft 1 in (1.85 m)	Jr	Baradene College; North Idaho College	Auckland, New Zealand
G	10	Kayla Lindsey	5 ft 9 in (1.75 m)	Sr	Norcross High School; Mount St. Mary's	Norcross, GA
F	11	Kyla McBride	6 ft 0 in (1.83 m)	Sr	Waxahachie High School; Texas State	Magnolia, AR
F	12	Nuria Mucongo	6 ft 3 in (1.91 m)	So	Clarendon College	Luanda, Angola
C	20	Roge'Ne' Hillard	6 ft 3 in (1.91 m)	Jr	Copiah Academy; Pearl River CC	Hazlehurst, MS
G	24	Destini Ward (5th)	5 ft 8 in (1.73 m)	Sr	Western Tech; Georgia Southern	Baltimore, MD
F	34	Amari Williams	6 ft 1 in (1.85 m)	So	Ben L. Smith High School; Presbyterian	Oklahoma City, OK

Head coach

- Scotty Fletcher (William Carey)

Assistant coach(es)

- Mendy McNeese (Queens (NC))
- Nikolas Quezada (Miami (OH))
- Chastadie Barrs (Lamar)
- William Marchino Jr. (Iowa)

Legend

- (C) Team captain
- (S) Suspended
- (I) Ineligible
- (W) Walk-on
- (5th) Fifth year senior
- Injured
- Current redshirt

Roster
Last update: August 29, 2026

== Schedule and results ==
Date time, TV	Rank^{#}	Opponent^{#}	Result	Record	High points	High rebounds	High assists	Site (attendance) city, state
Regular season
November 2, 2026*; TBA		at Ohio; MAC–SBC Challenge						Convocation Center; Athens, OH
November 5, 2026*; 6:30 p.m.		Centenary						b1Bank Fant Coliseum; Monroe, LA
November 9, 2026*; 6:30 p.m.		Central Arkansas						b1Bank Fant Coliseum; Monroe, LA
November 16, 2026*; 5:00 p.m.		Arkansas–Pine Bluff						b1Bank Fant Coliseum; Monroe, LA
November 19, 2026*; 6:30 p.m.		Sam Houston						b1Bank Fant Coliseum; Monroe, LA
November 24, 2026*; 6:00 p.m., SECN+		at Alabama						Coleman Coliseum; Tuscaloosa, AL
November 27, 2026*; 5:00 p.m.		vs. Fresno State; Big Easy Classic						Alario Center; Westwego, LA
November 28, 2026*; 5:00 p.m.		vs. Purdue Fort Wayne; Big Easy Classic						Alario Center; Westwego, LA
December 3, 2026*; 6:30 p.m.		Mississippi Valley State						b1Bank Fant Coliseum; Monroe, LA
December 6, 2026*; 2:00 p.m., SECN+		Ole Miss						SJB Pavilion; Oxford, MS
December 10, 2026*; 6:30 p.m.		Central Baptist						b1Bank Fant Coliseum; Monroe, LA
December 16, 2026; 5:15 p.m., ESPN+		at Troy						Trojan Arena; Troy, AL
December 19, 2026; 2:00 p.m.		James Madison						b1Bank Fant Coliseum; Monroe, LA
December 21, 2026*; 1:00 p.m., SECN+		at Oklahoma						Lloyd Noble Center; Norman, OK
December 28, 2026*; 6:30 p.m., SECN+		at Arkansas						Bud Walton Arena; Fayetteville, AR
December 31, 2026; 6:30 p.m.		Old Dominion						b1Bank Fant Coliseum; Monroe, LA
January 2, 2027; 2:00 p.m.		Coastal Carolina						b1Bank Fant Coliseum; Monroe, LA
January 7, 2027; 6:30 p.m.		at Appalachian State						Holmes Center; Boone, NC
January 9, 2027; 2:00 p.m.		at Georgia State						GSU Convocation Center; Atlanta, GA
January 14, 2027; 11:00 a.m.		at Louisiana						Cajundome; Lafayette, LA
January 16, 2027; 2:00 p.m., ESPN+		at Southern Miss						Reed Green Coliseum; Hattiesburg, MS
January 21, 2027; 6:30 p.m.		Arkansas State						b1Bank Fant Coliseum; Monroe, LA
January 23, 2027; 12:00 p.m.		Louisiana Tech						b1Bank Fant Coliseum; Monroe, LA
January 28, 2027; 6:30 p.m.		Troy						b1Bank Fant Coliseum; Monroe, LA
January 30, 2027; 2:00 p.m.		Louisiana						b1Bank Fant Coliseum; Monroe, LA
February 3, 2027; 6:30 p.m.		at Louisiana Tech						Thomas Assembly Center; Ruston, LA
February 6, 2027*; 2:00 p.m.		TBD; MAC–SBC Challenge						b1Bank Fant Coliseum; Monroe, LA
February 13, 2027; 1:00 p.m.		at Marshall						Cam Henderson Center; Huntington, WV
February 18, 2027; 6:30 p.m.		South Alabama						b1Bank Fant Coliseum; Monroe, LA
February 20, 2027; 12:00 p.m.		Southern Miss						b1Bank Fant Coliseum; Monroe, LA
February 23, 2027; TBA		at Arkansas State						First National Bank Arena; Jonesboro, AR
February 26, 2027; 6:30 p.m., ESPN+		at South Alabama						Mitchell Center; Mobile, AL
Sun Belt tournament
March 2–8, 2027; TBA		vs.						Pensacola Bay Center; Pensacola, FL
*Non-conference game. ^{#}Rankings from AP Poll. (#) Tournament seedings in parentheses. All times are in Eastern.
