= Kevin Pederson =

American basketball coach (born 1979)

Current position
- Title: Head coach
- Team: Coastal Carolina
- Conference: Sun Belt Conference
- Record: 64–64 (.500)

Biographical details
- Education: Clemson University (BA)

Coaching career (HC unless noted)
- 2001–2005: Anderson
- 2005–2022: Lander
- 2022–present: Coastal Carolina

Head coaching record
- Overall: 508–255 (.666)
- Tournaments: – (–)

Kevin Pederson is the current head coach of the Coastal Carolina Chanticleers women's basketball team.

== Head coaching record ==
Record table
Season	Team	Overall	Conference	Standing	Postseason
Anderson Trojans (CVAC) (2001–2005)
2001–02	Anderson	13–9	12–8	8th	
2002–03	Anderson	17–12	13–7		
2003–04	Anderson	25–7	16–4		NCAA Round of 32
2004–05	Anderson	33–3	19–1		NCAA Sweet Sixteen
Anderson:		88–31 (.739)	60–20 (.750)		
Lander Bearcats (Peach Belt Conference) (2005–2022)
2005–06	Lander	5–23			
2006–07	Lander	15–13			
2007–08	Lander	23–12			NCAA Round of 32
2008–09	Lander	20–11			NCAA Round of 64
2009–10	Lander	27–4			NCAA Sweet Sixteen
2010–11	Lander	29–4			
2011–12	Lander	24–8			
2012–13	Lander	9–17			
2013–14	Lander	12–17			
2014–15	Lander	23–7			
2015–16	Lander	25–7			
2016–17	Lander	25–8			-
2017–18	Lander	25–8			
2018–19	Lander	24–9			
2019–20	Lander	26–5			
2020–21	Lander	20–2			
2021–22	Lander	24–5			
Lander:		356–160 (.690)	– (–)		
Coastal Carolina (Sun Belt Conference) (2022–present)
2022–23	Coastal Carolina	14–16	9–9	9th	
2023–24	Coastal Carolina	12–21	5–13	11th	
2024–25	Coastal Carolina	23–9	12–6	4th	WNIT
2025–26	Coastal Carolina	14–18	7–11	9th	
2026–27	Coastal Carolina	1-0			
Coastal Carolina:		64–64 (.500)	33–39 (.458)		
Total:		508–255 (.666)			
National champion Postseason invitational champion Conference regular season champion Conference regular season and conference tournament champion Division regular season champion Division regular season and conference tournament champion Conference tournament champion
