= 2026–27 Arkansas State Red Wolves women's basketball team =

Intercollegiate basketball season

2026–27 Arkansas State Red Wolves women's basketball
- Conference: Sun Belt Conference
- Record: 0–0 (0–0 Sun Belt)
- Head coach: Destinee Rogers (6th season)
- Associate head coach: Lizzie Nessling; Rudy Evans
- Assistant coach: Colton Crowder
- Home arena: First National Bank Arena

2026–27 Sun Belt Conference women's basketball standings
	Conf.				Overall
Team	W		L	PCT	W		L	PCT
Appalachian State	0	–	0	–	0	–	0	–
Arkansas State	0	–	0	–	0	–	0	–
Coastal Carolina	0	–	0	–	0	–	0	–
Georgia Southern	0	–	0	–	0	–	0	–
Georgia State	0	–	0	–	0	–	0	–
James Madison	0	–	0	–	0	–	0	–
Louisiana	0	–	0	–	0	–	0	–
Louisiana–Monroe	0	–	0	–	0	–	0	–
Louisiana Tech	0	–	0	–	0	–	0	–
Marshall	0	–	0	–	0	–	0	–
Old Dominion	0	–	0	–	0	–	0	–
South Alabama	0	–	0	–	0	–	0	–
Southern Miss	0	–	0	–	0	–	0	–
Troy	0	–	0	–	0	–	0	–
† 2027 Sun Belt tournament winner

The 2026–27 Arkansas State Red Wolves women's basketball team will represent Arkansas State University during the 2026–27 NCAA Division I women's basketball season. The Red Wolves, led by sixth-year head coach Destinee Rogers, will play their home games at the First National Bank Arena in Jonesboro, Arkansas and compete as a member of the Sun Belt Conference.

== Previous season ==
The Red Wolves finished the 2025–26 season 27–10 overall and 14–4 in Sun Belt play, to finish in a tie for third in the conference with James Madison. As the No. 3 seed in the Sun Belt tournament, they earned a bye to the quarterfinals where they defeated No. 10 Louisiana–Monroe before falling to No. 2 Troy in the semifinals.

On March 15, following their elimination, the Red Wolves qualified for and accepted an at-large bid to the WNIT, making their first appearance in it since 2016. They earned a bye to Round 2, defeating Radford 83–52. The Red Wolves then defeated Purdue Fort Wayne and Cleveland State in the Super 16 and Great 8 respectively to advance to the Fab 4. They could not move on to the championship game, as they fell to eventual WNIT champions and fellow conference opponent Marshall 62–69 to end their season. Their 27 wins tied the program record for most wins in a season, which was last set in 2015–16.

== Offseason ==
=== Departures ===
Arkansas State departures
Name	Number	Pos.	Height	Year	Hometown	Reason for departure
D'Arrah Allen	0	Guard	5'8"	Senior	Compton, CA	Graduated
Wynter Rogers	2	Forward	5'10"	(redshirt) Senior	Little Rock, AR	Graduated
Mia Tarver	3	Guard	5'7"	Senior	Salt Lake City, UT	Graduated
Payton Fields	4	Guard	6'0"	Graduate student	El Paso, TX	Graduated
Marlie Dickerson	5	Guard	5'10"	Senior	Harrisburg, PA	Graduated
Yves Cox	6	Center	6'2"	Sophomore	Savannah, TX	Transferred to North Carolina A&T
Mimi McCollister	12	Guard	5'6"	Graduate student	Athens, TX	Graduated
Zyion Shannon	21	Guard	5'8"	Senior	Smyrna, TN	Graduated
Bella Weary	23	Guard	5'6"	(redshirt) Senior	Jacksonville, FL	Graduated

=== Incoming transfers ===
Arkansas State incoming transfers
Name	Number	Pos.	Height	Year	Hometown	Previous school
Amina Gray	2	Guard	5'6"	Senior	DeKalb, IL	Gardner–Webb
Jermesha Frierson	3	Guard	5'7"	Senior	Shreveport, LA	Delaware
Maya Chocano	9	Guard	6'1"	Senior	Toronto, Ontario	UC Riverside
Angela Carroll	10	Forward	6'1"	Sophomore	Waco, TX	Texas State
Audreonia Benson	14	Guard	5'8"	Senior	Birmingham, AL	UCF
Monica Marsh	21	Guard	5'5"	Senior	Plano, TX	Grambling State
Jaidyn Elam	23	Guard	5'11"	Junior	Pontiac, MI	South Georgia Technical (NJCAA)
Jasmine Jordan	32	Center	6'2"	Junior	Ashland, KY	Eastern Kentucky

=== Recruiting class ===
There was no 2026 recruiting class.

== Roster ==
2026–27 Arkansas State Red Wolves women's basketball team
Players
Coaches

Pos.	#	Name	Height	Year	Previous school	Hometown
G	0	Ta'Niyah Davis	5 ft 8 in (1.73 m)	Fr	Northeast High School	Sunrise, FL
G	1	Crislyn Rose	5 ft 8 in (1.73 m)	Sr	Sachse High School	Sachse, TX
G	2	Amina Gray	5 ft 6 in (1.68 m)	Sr	Example Academy; Gardner–Webb	DeKalb, IL
G	3	Jermesha Frierson	5 ft 7 in (1.7 m)	Sr	Southwood High School; Delaware State	Shreveport, LA
G	9	Maya Chocano	6 ft 1 in (1.85 m)	Sr	King's Christian Collegiate; UC Riverside	Toronto, Ontario
F	10	Angela Carroll	6 ft 1 in (1.85 m)	So	La Vega High School; Texas State	Waco, TX
G	11	Aniyah Ruddock	5 ft 8 in (1.73 m)	Jr	Blanche Ely High School; Chipola	Pompano Beach, FL
G	14	Audreonia Benson	5 ft 8 in (1.73 m)	Sr	Hewitt-Trussville High School; UCF	Birmingham, AL
G	21	Monica Marsh	5 ft 5 in (1.65 m)	Sr	Plano West High School; Grambling State	Plano, TX
G	23	Jaidyn Elam	5 ft 11 in (1.8 m)	Jr	Detroit Country Day School; South Georgia Technical College	Pontiac, MI
F	24	Allyson Ferguson	6 ft 1 in (1.85 m)	Sr	Manvel High School; Northwest Florida State College	Houston, TX
C	32	Jasmine Jordan	6 ft 2 in (1.88 m)	Jr	Boyd County High School; Eastern Kentucky	Ashland, KY

Head coach

- Destinee Rogers (Central Arkansas)

Assistant coach(es)

- Lizzie Nessling (Saint Mary)
- Rudy Evans (Berea)
- Colton Crowder (Arkansas)

Legend

- (C) Team captain
- (S) Suspended
- (I) Ineligible
- (W) Walk-on
- Injured
- Current redshirt

Roster
Last update: August 25, 2026

== Schedule and results ==
Date time, TV	Rank^{#}	Opponent^{#}	Result	Record	High points	High rebounds	High assists	Site (attendance) city, state
Exhibition
October 28, 2026*; TBA		Delta State						First National Bank Arena; Jonesboro, AR
Regular season
November 2, 2026*; TBA		at Ball State; MAC–SBC Challenge						Worthen Arena; Muncie, IN
November 7, 2026*; TBA		at Florida Gulf Coast						Alico Arena; Fort Myers, FL
November 11, 2026*; TBA		at Loyola Chicago						Joseph J. Gentile Arena; Chicago, IL
November 17, 2026*; TBA		Jackson State						First National Bank Arena; Jonesboro, AR
November 22, 2026*; TBA		vs. North Texas; Hoopfest Basketball Women's Challenge						Comerica Center; Frisco, TX
November 25, 2026*; TBA		vs. Stephen F. Austin; Hoopfest Basketball Women's Challenge						Comerica Center; Frisco, TX
November 29, 2026*; TBA		Central Arkansas						First National Bank Arena; Jonesboro, AR
December 2, 2026*; TBA		at Little Rock						Jack Stephens Center; Little Rock, AR
December 6, 2026*; TBA		at Arkansas						Bud Walton Arena; Fayetteville, AR
December 10, 2026*; TBA		at Texas						Moody Center; Austin, TX
December 14, 2026*; TBA		Mississippi Valley State						First National Bank Arena; Jonesboro, AR
December 19, 2026; TBA		at Georgia Southern						Hill Convocation Center; Statesboro, GA
December 22, 2026*; TBA		Southern Indiana						First National Bank Arena; Jonesboro, AR
December 30, 2026; TBA		James Madison						First National Bank Arena; Jonesboro, AR
January 2, 2027; TBA		Marshall						First National Bank Arena; Jonesboro, AR
January 7, 2027; TBA		at Georgia State						GSU Convocation Center; Atlanta, GA
January 9, 2027; TBA		at Appalachian State						Holmes Center; Boone, NC
January 13, 2027; TBA		South Alabama						First National Bank Arena; Jonesboro, AR
January 16, 2027; TBA		Troy						First National Bank Arena; Jonesboro, AR
January 21, 2027; TBA		at Louisiana–Monroe						b1Bank Fant Coliseum; Monroe, LA
January 23, 2027; TBA		at South Alabama						Mitchell Center; Mobile, AL
January 28, 2027; TBA		Louisiana						First National Bank Arena; Jonesboro, AR
January 30, 2027; TBA		Southern Miss						First National Bank Arena; Jonesboro, AR
February 3, 2027; TBA		Old Dominion						First National Bank Arena; Jonesboro, AR
February 6, 2027*; TBA		TBD; MAC–SBC Challenge						First National Bank Arena; Jonesboro, AR
February 11, 2027; TBA		at Southern Miss						Reed Green Coliseum; Hattiesburg, MS
February 13, 2027; TBA		at Louisiana						Cajundome; Lafayette, LA
February 17, 2027; TBA		at Louisiana Tech						Thomas Assembly Center; Ruston, LA
February 20, 2027; TBA		at Troy						Trojan Arena; Troy, AL
February 23, 2027; TBA		Louisiana–Monroe						First National Bank Arena; Jonesboro, AR
February 26, 2027; TBA		Louisiana Tech						First National Bank Arena; Jonesboro, AR
Sun Belt tournament
March 2–8, 2027; TBA		vs.						Pensacola Bay Center; Pensacola, FL
*Non-conference game. ^{#}Rankings from AP Poll. (#) Tournament seedings in parentheses. All times are in Central.
