= Coastal Carolina Chanticleers basketball =

Coastal Carolina Chanticleers basketball may refer to either of the basketball teams that represent Coastal Carolina University:

- Coastal Carolina Chanticleers men's basketball
- Coastal Carolina Chanticleers women's basketball
