= 2026–27 Southern Miss Lady Eagles basketball team =

American college basketball season

2026–27 Southern Miss Lady Eagles basketball
- Conference: Sun Belt Conference
- Record: 0–0 (0–0 Sun Belt)
- Head coach: Missy Bilderback (2nd season)
- Associate head coach: Lauren Pittman
- Assistant coaches: Jonathan Williams; Lauren Gross
- Home arena: Reed Green Coliseum

2026–27 Sun Belt Conference women's basketball standings
	Conf.				Overall
Team	W		L	PCT	W		L	PCT
Appalachian State	0	–	0	–	0	–	0	–
Arkansas State	0	–	0	–	0	–	0	–
Coastal Carolina	0	–	0	–	0	–	0	–
Georgia Southern	0	–	0	–	0	–	0	–
Georgia State	0	–	0	–	0	–	0	–
James Madison	0	–	0	–	0	–	0	–
Louisiana	0	–	0	–	0	–	0	–
Louisiana–Monroe	0	–	0	–	0	–	0	–
Louisiana Tech	0	–	0	–	0	–	0	–
Marshall	0	–	0	–	0	–	0	–
Old Dominion	0	–	0	–	0	–	0	–
South Alabama	0	–	0	–	0	–	0	–
Southern Miss	0	–	0	–	0	–	0	–
Troy	0	–	0	–	0	–	0	–
† 2027 Sun Belt tournament winner

The 2026–27 Southern Miss Lady Eagles basketball team will represent the University of Southern Mississippi during the 2026–27 NCAA Division I women's basketball season. The Lady Eagles, led by second-year head coach Missy Bilderback, will play their home games at the Reed Green Coliseum in Hattiesburg, Mississippi and compete as a member of the Sun Belt Conference.

== Previous season ==
The Lady Eagles finished the 2025–26 season 15–16 overall and 8–10 in Sun Belt play, to finish seventh in the conference. As the No. 7 seed in the Sun Belt tournament, they lost to No. 10 Louisiana–Monroe 72–89 in the third round to end their season.

== Offseason ==
=== Departures ===
Southern Miss departures
Name	Number	Pos.	Height	Year	Hometown	Reason for departure
Anaisha Carriere	0	Guard/Forward	6'3"	Sophomore	Gulfport, MS	TBD; not listed on roster
Jakayla Johnson	3	Guard	5'9"	Graduate student	Clinton, MS	Graduated
Brikayla Gray	6	Guard	5'8"	Graduate student	New Hebron, MS	Graduated
Meloney Thomas	8	Guard	5'8"	Graduate student	Philadelphia, MS	Graduated
Morgan Sieper	12	Guard	6'0"	Junior	Tampa, FL	Transferred to Tennessee Tech
Je'Mya Evans	20	Forward	6'0"	Senior	Gulfport, MS	Graduated
Carly Keats	21	Guard	5'7"	Senior	Philadelphia, MS	Graduated
Sakyia White	22	Forward	6'1"	Graduate student	Tuscaloosa, AL	Graduated
Hayleigh Breland	23	Guard	5'8"	Senior	Wiggins, MS	Graduated

=== Incoming transfers ===
Southern Miss incoming transfers
Name	Number	Pos.	Height	Year	Hometown	Previous school
Chrysta Narcisse	3	Guard	5'8"	(redshirt) Junior	Lafayette, LA	South Alabama
Kennedy Langham	4	Guard	5'8"	Senior	Harvest, AL	Butler
Nadia Norfleet	5	Guard	5'5"	Sophomore	Tupelo, MS	Shelton State CC (NJCAA)
Bruna da Silva	9	Guard	5'9"	Junior	São Paulo, Brazil	Eastern Florida State (NJCAA)
Nakiyah Allen	11	Guard	5'10"	Senior	Boyce, LA	Old Dominion
Kylie Marshall	22	Guard	6'0"	Senior	Mansfield, TX	James Madison
Mariah Clayton	23	Forward	5'9"	Junior	Mesquite, TX	Old Dominion

=== Recruiting class ===
There was no 2026 recruiting class.

== Roster ==
2026–27 Southern Miss Lady Eagles women's basketball team
Players
Coaches

Pos.	#	Name	Height	Year	Previous school	Hometown
G/F	1	Jada Gay	6 ft 3 in (1.91 m)	Fr	Starkville High School	Starkville, MS
G	2	Ramiah "Moonie" Augurson	6 ft 1 in (1.85 m)	So	Wossman High School	Monroe, LA
G	3	Chrystia Narcisse	5 ft 8 in (1.73 m)	RS Jr	Lafayette High School; South Alabama	Lafayette, LA
G	4	Kennedy Langham	5 ft 8 in (1.73 m)	Sr	Sparkman High School; Butler	Harvest, AL
G	5	Nadia Norfleet	5 ft 5 in (1.65 m)	So	Tupelo High School; Shelton State CC	Tupelo, MS
G	9	Bruna da Silva	5 ft 9 in (1.75 m)	Jr	E.E. Ermano Marchetti; Eastern Florida State College	São Paulo, Brazil
G	10	Miriam Prince	5 ft 7 in (1.7 m)	Sr	Leake Academy; Louisiana–Monroe	Philadelphia, MS
F	11	Nakiyah Allen	5 ft 10 in (1.78 m)	Sr	Northwood High School; Old Dominion	Boyce, LA
F	12	Meg Barbour	6 ft 3 in (1.91 m)	Fr	Jackson Preparatory School	Jackson, MS
G	22	Kylie Marshall	6 ft 0 in (1.83 m)	Sr	Lake Ridge High School; James Madison	Mansfield, TX
F	23	Mariah Clayton	5 ft 9 in (1.75 m)	Jr	Duncanville High School; Old Dominion	Mesquite, TX
C	32	Timya Thurman	6 ft 5 in (1.96 m)	Sr	Linden High School; Auburn	Linden, AL
C	35	Whitney Hart	6 ft 3 in (1.91 m)	RS So	Liberty Magnet High School	Baton Rouge, LA

Head coach

- Missy Bilderback (Southern Miss)

Assistant coach(es)

- Lauren Pittman (Southern Miss)
- Jonathan Williams (Faulkner)
- Lauren Gross (Louisiana–Monroe)

Legend

- (C) Team captain
- (S) Suspended
- (I) Ineligible
- (W) Walk-on
- Injured
- Current redshirt

Roster
Last update: September 5, 2026

== Schedule and results ==
Date time, TV	Rank^{#}	Opponent^{#}	Result	Record	High points	High rebounds	High assists	Site (attendance) city, state
Exhibition
October 27, 2026*; 6:00 p.m., ESPN+		East Texas Baptist	W 89–45		16 – Langham	7 – Hart	4 – Tied	Reed Green Coliseum; Hattiesburg, MS
Regular season
November 2, 2026*; 11:00 a.m., ESPN+		Mississippi Christian						Reed Green Coliseum; Hattiesburg, MS
November 5, 2026*; 6:00 p.m., SECN+		at Auburn						Neville Arena; Auburn, AL
November 9, 2026*; 6:00 p.m., ESPN+		Mississippi Valley State						Reed Green Coliseum; Hattiesburg, MS
November 12, 2026*; 6:00 p.m., ESPN+		Jackson State						Reed Green Coliseum; Hattiesburg, MS
November 16, 2026*; 6:00 p.m., ESPN+		Jacksonville State						Reed Green Coliseum; Hattiesburg, MS
November 18, 2026*; 6:00 p.m., ESPN+		McNeese						Reed Green Coliseum; Hattiesburg, MS
November 22, 2026*; 2:00 p.m., ESPN+		Mississippi State						Reed Green Coliseum; Hattiesburg, MS
November 27, 2026*; 1:30 p.m.		vs. Drexel; Iona Turkey Tip-Off						Hynes Athletic Center; New Rochelle, NY
November 28, 2026*; 10:00 a.m./12:30 p.m.		vs. Iona or UMBC; Iona Turkey Tip-Off						Hynes Athletic Center; New Rochelle, NY
December 2, 2026*; 5:00 p.m., ESPN+		West Alabama						Reed Green Coliseum; Hattiesburg, MS
December 6, 2026*; 2:00 p.m., ESPN+		at UAB						Bartow Arena; Birmingham, AL
December 11, 2026*; 8:30 p.m., ESPN+		at Fresno State						Bartow Arena; Birmingham, AL
December 16, 2026; 6:00 p.m., ESPN+		South Alabama						Reed Green Coliseum; Hattiesburg, MS
December 19, 2026; 2:00 p.m., ESPN+		at Old Dominion						Chartway Arena; Norfolk, VA
December 21, 2026*; 12:00 p.m., ESPN+		at VCU						Stuart C. Siegel Center; Richmond, VA
December 31, 2026; 6:00 p.m., ESPN+		Appalachian State						Reed Green Coliseum; Hattiesburg, MS
January 2, 2027; 2:00 p.m., ESPN+		Georgia Southern						Reed Green Coliseum; Hattiesburg, MS
January 6, 2027; 5:00 p.m., ESPN+		at James Madison						Atlantic Union Bank Center; Harrisonburg, VA
January 9, 2027; 12:00 p.m., ESPN+		at Coastal Carolina						HTC Center; Conway, SC
January 13, 2027; 5:00 p.m., ESPN+		Troy						Reed Green Coliseum; Hattiesburg, MS
January 16, 2027; 2:00 p.m., ESPN+		Louisiana–Monroe						Reed Green Coliseum; Hattiesburg, MS
January 20, 2027; 6:30 p.m., ESPN+		at South Alabama						Mitchell Center; Mobile, AL
January 23, 2027; 1:00 p.m., ESPN+		at Louisiana						Cajundome; Lafayette, LA
January 28, 2027; 5:00 p.m., ESPN+		at Louisiana Tech						Thomas Assembly Center; Ruston, LA
January 30, 2027; 2:30 p.m., ESPN+		at Arkansas State						First National Bank Arena; Jonesboro, AR
February 6, 2027; 1:00 p.m., ESPN+		Louisiana						Reed Green Coliseum; Hattiesburg, MS
February 11, 2027; 5:00 p.m., ESPN+		Arkansas State						Reed Green Coliseum; Hattiesburg, MS
February 13, 2027; 2:00 p.m., ESPN+		Louisiana Tech						Reed Green Coliseum; Hattiesburg, MS
February 17, 2027; 6:00 p.m., ESPN+		at Troy						Trojan Arena; Troy, AL
February 20, 2027; 12:00 p.m., ESPN+		at Louisiana–Monroe						b1Bank Fant Coliseum; Monroe, LA
February 26, 2027; 6:00 p.m., ESPN+		at Georgia State						Reed Green Coliseum; Hattiesburg, MS
Sun Belt tournament
March 2–8, 2027; TBA		vs.						Pensacola Bay Center; Pensacola, FL
*Non-conference game. ^{#}Rankings from AP Poll. (#) Tournament seedings in parentheses. All times are in Central.
