= 2026–27 Louisiana Tech Lady Techsters basketball team =

American college basketball season

2026–27 Louisiana Tech Lady Techsters basketball
- Conference: Sun Belt Conference
- Record: 4–1 (0–0 Sun Belt)
- Head coach: Brooke Stoehr (11th season)
- Assistant coaches: Scott Stoehr; Josh Ashley; Olivia Grayson; Caleb Livingston
- Home arena: Thomas Assembly Center

2026–27 Sun Belt Conference women's basketball standings
	Conf.				Overall
Team	W		L	PCT	W		L	PCT
Louisiana Tech	0	–	0	–	4	–	1	.800
Marshall	0	–	0	–	4	–	1	.800
Appalachian State	0	–	0	–	3	–	1	.750
Coastal Carolina	0	–	0	–	3	–	1	.750
Southern Miss	0	–	0	–	3	–	1	.750
James Madison	0	–	0	–	3	–	2	.600
Old Dominion	0	–	0	–	3	–	2	.600
Georgia Southern	0	–	0	–	2	–	2	.500
Troy	0	–	0	–	2	–	2	.500
Louisiana	0	–	0	–	1	–	2	.333
Louisiana–Monroe	0	–	0	–	1	–	2	.333
Georgia State	0	–	0	–	1	–	4	.200
South Alabama	0	–	0	–	1	–	4	.200
Arkansas State	0	–	0	–	0	–	3	.000
† 2027 Sun Belt tournament winner As of November 16, 2026

The 2026–27 Louisiana Tech Lady Techsters basketball team will represent Louisiana Tech University during the 2026–27 NCAA Division I women's basketball season. The Lady Techsters, led by eleventh-year head coach Brooke Stoehr, will play their home games at the Thomas Assembly Center in Ruston, Louisiana as a first-year member of the Sun Belt Conference.

== Previous season ==
The Lady Techsters finished the 2025–26 season 25–7 overall and 17–1 in C-USA play, to finish as conference regular season champions. This was also their first regular season title as a Conference USA member, and their first overall since 2011 when the program was still a member of the Western Athletic Conference. The Lady Techsters' only conference loss came in the first game of play, when they lost 64–67 at home against Sam Houston.

As the top seed in the Conference USA tournament, the Lady Techsters earned a bye to the quarterfinals, where they defeated No. 8 Delaware before beating No. 5 Liberty in the semifinals to advance to the championship game. They could not capture the conference title, as they would lose 38–43 to No. 6 Missouri State.

As regular season champions who did not win their conference tournament, the Lady Techsters earned an automatic bid to the WBIT, their first appearance in the tournament, where they were unseeded in the Texas A&M Bracket. They lost in the first round to No. 3 Rice 61–66 to end their season. This was Louisiana Tech's final season in Conference USA, as they departed to join the Sun Belt Conference on July 1, 2026.

== Offseason ==
=== Departures ===
Louisiana Tech departures
Name	Number	Pos.	Height	Year	Hometown	Reason for departure
Jayden Terry	10	Guard	5'9"	Freshman	Gainesville, FL	Transferred to Wright State
Jianna Morris	12	Guard	5'7"	Junior	Sherwood, AR	Transferred to Arkansas
Paris Bradley	23	Guard	5'9"	Sophomore	Carrollton, TX	Transferred to Alabama
Averi Aaron	25	Forward	6'1"	Sophomore	Boerne, TX	Transferred to Purdue
Mackenzie Wurm	33	Forward	6'4"	Graduate student	Allen, TX	Graduated

=== Incoming transfers ===
Louisiana Tech incoming transfers
Name	Number	Pos.	Height	Year	Hometown	Previous school
Brittani Wells	2	Guard	5'7"	Senior	Lakeland, TN	UT Martin
Alana Obianozie	7	Guard	5'9"	Junior	Madison, AL	Shelton State CC (NJCAA)
Jordyn McNeal	12	Forward	5'11"	Junior	Fort Worth, TX	Murray State College (NJCAA)

=== Recruiting class ===
There was no 2026 recruiting class.

== Roster ==
2026–27 Louisiana Tech Lady Techsters women's basketball team
Players
Coaches

Pos.	#	Name	Height	Year	Previous school	Hometown
G	1	Alexia Weaver	5 ft 8 in (1.73 m)	Sr	duPont Manual High School; Three Rivers College	Louisville, KY
G	2	Brittani Wells	5 ft 7 in (1.7 m)	Sr	Arlington High School; UT Martin	Lakeland, TN
F	3	Hillary Dawson	6 ft 3 in (1.91 m)	So	Malakoff High School	Malakoff, TX
G	4	Joy Madison-Key	5 ft 8 in (1.73 m)	RS Jr	South Grand Prairie High School; Tulane	Grand Prairie, TX
G	7	Alana Obianozie	5 ft 9 in (1.75 m)	Jr	Bob Jones High School; Shelton State CC	Madison, AL
F	12	Jordyn McNeal	5 ft 11 in (1.8 m)	Jr	Burleson Centennial High School; Murray State College	Fort Worth, TX
F	15	Jordan Marshall	6 ft 0 in (1.83 m)	Jr	Little Rock Central High School	Little Rock, AR
F	18	Isla Airey	6 ft 4 in (1.93 m)	Jr	Caulfield Grammar School	Melbourne, Australia
G	21	Kennedy Evans	5 ft 10 in (1.78 m)	RS So	Legion Prep; Oklahoma State	Little Elm, TX
F	23	E'Marriha Johnson	6 ft 0 in (1.83 m)	Fr	Greene County Tech	Paragould, AR
G	25	Pressley Powell	5 ft 11 in (1.8 m)	Fr	Frisco Memorial High School	Frisco, TX
G	30	Kaleigh Thompson	6 ft 0 in (1.83 m)	Sr	Lonoke High School; Three Rivers College	Lonoke, AR

Head coach

- Brooke Stoehr (Louisiana Tech)

Assistant coach(es)

- Scott Stoehr (North Texas)
- Josh Ashley (Tarleton State)
- Olivia Grayson (Tulane)
- Caleb Livingston (Williams Baptist)

Legend

- (C) Team captain
- (S) Suspended
- (I) Ineligible
- (W) Walk-on
- Injured
- Current redshirt

Roster
Last update: August 30, 2026

== Schedule and results ==
Date time, TV	Rank^{#}	Opponent^{#}	Result	Record	High points	High rebounds	High assists	Site (attendance) city, state
Exhibition
October 18, 2026*; 4:00 p.m.		vs. Mississippi State	L 65–80		–	–	–	Tushka Arena; Choctaw, MS
Regular season
November 2, 2026*; 6:00 p.m., ESPN+		at Toledo; MAC–SBC Challenge	W 61–57	1–0	14 – Marshall	11 – Marshall	6 – Wells	Savage Arena (3,844); Toledo, OH
November 5, 2026*; 11:00 a.m., ESPN+		Texas A&M–Texarkana	W 90–41	2–0	15 – Weaver	10 – Airey	6 – Wells	Thomas Assembly Center (3,485); Ruston, LA
November 8, 2026*; 1:00 p.m., ESPN+		at McNeese	W 82–59	3–0	21 – Dawson	10 – Wells	8 – Wells	Townsley Law Arena (2,115); Lake Charles, LA
November 12, 2026*; 6:30 p.m., ESPN+		Northwestern State	W 78–51	4–0	18 – Weaver	6 – Tied	4 – Wells	Thomas Assembly Center (1,438); Ruston, LA
November 15, 2026*; 2:00 p.m., SECN+		at No. 21 Ole Miss	L 53–69	4–1	10 – Tied	4 – Wells	3 – Tied	SJB Pavilion (2,704); Oxford, MS
November 18, 2026*; TBA		Arkansas–Pine Bluff						Thomas Assembly Center; Ruston, LA
November 22, 2026*; TBA		at Georgia						Stegeman Coliseum; Athens, GA
November 25, 2026*; TBA		Mississippi Valley State						Thomas Assembly Center; Ruston, LA
November 29, 2026*; TBA		at Arkansas						Bud Walton Arena; Fayetteville, AR
December 7, 2026*; TBA		Memphis						Thomas Assembly Center; Ruston, LA
December 10, 2026*; TBA		at Stephen F. Austin						William R. Johnson Coliseum; Nacogdoches, TX
December 13, 2026*; TBA		East Texas A&M						Thomas Assembly Center; Ruston, LA
December 16, 2026; TBA		Louisiana						Thomas Assembly Center; Ruston, LA
December 19, 2026; TBA		at Appalachian State						Holmes Convocation Center; Boone, NC
December 21, 2026*; TBA		Central Baptist						Thomas Assembly Center; Ruston, LA
December 31, 2026; TBA		Coastal Carolina						Thomas Assembly Center; Ruston, LA
January 2, 2027; TBA		Old Dominion						Thomas Assembly Center; Ruston, LA
January 7, 2027; TBA		at Marshall						Cam Henderson Center; Huntington, WV
January 9, 2027; TBA		at James Madison						Atlantic Union Bank Center; Harrisonburg, VA
January 16, 2027; TBA		Georgia Southern						Thomas Assembly Center; Ruston, LA
January 21, 2027; TBA		at Louisiana						Cajundome; Lafayette, LA
January 23, 2027; TBA		at Louisiana–Monroe						b1Bank Fant Coliseum; Monroe, LA
January 28, 2027; TBA		Southern Miss						Thomas Assembly Center; Ruston, LA
January 30, 2027; TBA		Troy						Thomas Assembly Center; Ruston, LA
February 3, 2027; TBA		Louisiana–Monroe						Thomas Assembly Center; Ruston, LA
February 6, 2027*; TBA		TBD; MAC–SBC Challenge						Thomas Assembly Center; Ruston, LA
February 11, 2027; TBA		at Louisiana–Monroe						Mitchell Center; Mobile, AL
February 13, 2027; TBA		at Southern Miss						Reed Green Coliseum; Hattiesburg, MS
February 17, 2027*; TBA		Arkansas State						Thomas Assembly Center; Ruston, LA
February 20, 2027*; TBA		South Alabama						Thomas Assembly Center; Ruston, LA
February 23, 2027*; TBA		at Troy						Trojan Arena; Troy, AL
February 26, 2027*; TBA		at Arkansas State						First National Bank Arena; Jonesboro, AR
Sun Belt tournament
March 2–8, 2027; TBA		vs.						Pensacola Bay Center; Pensacola, FL
*Non-conference game. ^{#}Rankings from AP Poll. (#) Tournament seedings in parentheses. All times are in Central.
