= 2026–27 South Alabama Jaguars women's basketball team =

Intercollegiate basketball season

2026–27 South Alabama Jaguars women's basketball
- Conference: Sun Belt Conference
- Record: 1–4 (0–0 Sun Belt)
- Head coach: Yolisha Jackson (4th season)
- Assistant coaches: Eryc Pittman; Colby Davis; Brandon Jaijairam; Casey Ferguson
- Home arena: Mitchell Center

2026–27 Sun Belt Conference women's basketball standings
	Conf.				Overall
Team	W		L	PCT	W		L	PCT
Louisiana Tech	0	–	0	–	4	–	1	.800
Marshall	0	–	0	–	4	–	1	.800
Southern Miss	0	–	0	–	4	–	1	.800
Appalachian State	0	–	0	–	3	–	1	.750
Coastal Carolina	0	–	0	–	3	–	1	.750
James Madison	0	–	0	–	3	–	2	.600
Old Dominion	0	–	0	–	3	–	2	.600
Georgia Southern	0	–	0	–	2	–	2	.500
Troy	0	–	0	–	2	–	3	.400
Louisiana	0	–	0	–	1	–	3	.250
Louisiana–Monroe	0	–	0	–	1	–	3	.250
Georgia State	0	–	0	–	1	–	4	.200
South Alabama	0	–	0	–	1	–	4	.200
Arkansas State	0	–	0	–	0	–	3	.000
† 2027 Sun Belt tournament winner As of November 17, 2026

The 2026–27 South Alabama Jaguars women's basketball team represents the University of South Alabama during the 2026–27 NCAA Division I women's basketball season. The Jaguars, led by fourth-year head coach Yolisha Jackson, plays their home games at the Mitchell Center in Mobile, Alabama and competes as a member of the Sun Belt Conference.

== Previous season ==
The Jaguars finished the 2025–26 season 17–19 overall and 5–13 in Sun Belt play, to finish in a tie for twelfth in the conference with Georgia State. As the No. 12 seed in the Sun Belt tournament, they pulled off an unprecedented tournament run, winning four games in four days as they knocked out No. 13 Appalachian State, No. 9 Coastal Carolina, No. 8 Texas State and No. 5 Marshall to advance to the quarterfinals. They lost to eventual tournament champions No. 4 James Madison 54–79 to end their run.

Following their elimination from the Sun Belt tournament, the Jaguars earned and accepted an at-large bid to the WNIT, their 5th overall appearance and first since 2019. They defeated Alcorn State in Round 1, before falling to Purdue Fort Wayne in Round 2 to end their season.

== Offseason ==
=== Departures ===
South Alabama departures
Name	Number	Pos.	Height	Year	Hometown	Reason for departure
Chrysta Narcisse	0	Guard	5'8"	(redshirt) Sophomore	Lafayette, LA	Transferred to Southern Miss
Ronaltha Marc	3	Guard	5'10"	Graduate Student	Miami, FL	Graduated
Chloe Donnell	4	Guard	5'7"	Freshman	Boerne, TX	Transferred to Northwestern State
Princess Okafor Nweze	15	Forward	6'1"	Sophomore	Malaga, Spain	Transferred to Cal State Northridge
Daniela Gonzalez	20	Forward	6'0"	Senior	Jamundí, Colombia	Graduated
Alicia Spann	21	Center	6'3"	Senior	Sumter, SC	Graduated
Cordasia Harris	22	Forward	6'1"	Graduate Student	Collirene, AL	Graduated
Tamara Ortiz	24	Guard	5'4"	(redshirt) Senior	Columbus, OH	Transferred to Southern Indiana
Diawna Carter-Hartley	25	Forward	6'1"	Junior	Cincinnati, OH	Transferred to Xavier
Jeriyah Barnes	30	Forward	5'10"	Freshman	Killeen, TX	Transferred to East Texas A&M

=== Incoming transfers ===
South Alabama incoming transfers
Name	Number	Pos.	Height	Year	Hometown	Previous school
Jolie Mantz	3	Guard	5'8"	Junior	Keaau, HI	Dodge City CC (NJCAA)
Jaida Redwine	4	Guard	5'9"	(redshirt) Sophomore	Denver, CO	Chipola (NJCAA)
Julieta Ceja	5	Forward	6'0"	(redshirt) Senior	Jiquilpan, Mexico	Eastern New Mexico (D-II)
CJ Wilson	14	Guard	5'9"	Junior	Atlanta, GA	Prairie View A&M
Esther Krusite	24	Center	6'2"	Junior	London, England	Sacred Heart
Deborah Orianegbena	30	Forward	6'2"	Junior	Edo State, Nigeria	UNC Asheville

=== Recruiting class ===
There was no 2026 recruiting class.

== Roster ==
2026–27 South Alabama Jaguars women's basketball team
Players
Coaches

Pos.	#	Name	Height	Year	Previous school	Hometown
G	1	Miyah Holmes	6 ft 0 in (1.83 m)	So	Carrollton High School	Carrollton, GA
G	3	Jolie Mantz	5 ft 8 in (1.73 m)	Jr	Waiakea High School; Dodge City CC	Keaau, HI
G	4	Jaida Redwine	5 ft 9 in (1.75 m)	RS So	George Washington High School; Chipola College	Denver, CO
F	5	Julieta Ceja	6 ft 0 in (1.83 m)	RS Sr	Colegio San Carlos; Eastern New Mexico	Jiquilpan, Mexico
G	7	Aroa Mangas	5 ft 9 in (1.75 m)	Jr	IES La Laboral	Salamanca, Spain
G	8	Terren Coffil	5 ft 7 in (1.7 m)	Jr	Chalmette High School	New Orleans, LA
G	11	Amyah Sutton	5 ft 7 in (1.7 m)	Sr	Classen School of Advanced Studies; New Mexico JC	Oklahoma City, OK
G	14	CJ Wilson	5 ft 7 in (1.7 m)	Jr	Stockbridge High School; Prairie View A&M	Atlanta, GA
F	21	Hannah Dibadjou	6 ft 1 in (1.85 m)	So	The Bridge International School	Douala, Cameroon
G	22	Cam Golston	5 ft 5 in (1.65 m)	Fr	St. Francis Schools	Alpharetta, GA
G	23	Saneea Bevley	5 ft 7 in (1.7 m)	RS Sr	Blue Springs High School; McLennan CC	Kansas City, MO
C	24	Esther Kursite	6 ft 2 in (1.88 m)	Jr	City of London Academy, Southwark; Sacred Heart	London, England
F	30	Deborah Orianegbena	6 ft 2 in (1.88 m)	Jr	Victory Christian Center School; UNC Asheville	Edo State, Nigeria

Head coach

- Yolisha Jackson (Jacksonville)

Assistant coach(es)

- Eryc Pittman (Hampton)
- Colby Davis (South Alabama)
- Brandon Jaijairam (South Florida)
- Casey Ferguson (South Alabama)

Legend

- (C) Team captain
- (S) Suspended
- (I) Ineligible
- (W) Walk-on
- Injured
- Current redshirt

Roster
Last update: September 1, 2026

== Schedule and results ==
Date time, TV	Rank^{#}	Opponent^{#}	Result	Record	High points	High rebounds	High assists	Site (attendance) city, state
Exhibition
October 28, 2026*; TBA		Southeastern Baptist						Mitchell Center; Mobile, AL
Regular season
November 2, 2026*; 5:00 p.m., ESPN+		at Akron; MAC-SBC Challenge	W 75–74	1–0	20 – Wilson	12 – Orianegbena	5 – Wilson	James A. Rhodes Arena (524); Akron, OH
November 7, 2026*; 1:00 p.m., ESPN+		UAB	L 59–73	1–1	19 – Wilson	8 – Orianegbena	4 – Mantz	Mitchell Center (273); Mobile, AL
November 9, 2026*; 5:30 p.m., ESPN+		at UCF	L 59–85	1–2	16 – Coffil	10 – Orianegbena	1 – Tied	Addition Financial Arena (722); Orlando, FL
November 11, 2026*; 12:00 p.m., ESPN+		at Florida Atlantic	L 57–85	1–3	24 – Wilson	11 – Orianegbena	2 – Ceja	Eleanor R. Baldwin Arena (687); Boca Raton, FL
November 15, 2026*; 1:00 p.m., ESPN+		at Kennesaw State	L 77–82	1–4	23 – Coffil	6 – Tied	3 – Redwine	Convocation Center (658); Kennesaw, GA
November 19, 2026*; 11:00 a.m., ESPN+		at Memphis						Elma Roane Fieldhouse; Memphis, TN
November 23, 2026*; 6:30 p.m., ESPN+		Clayton State						Mitchell Center; Mobile, AL
November 28, 2026*; 1:30 p.m., ESPN+		Wichita State; Jaguar Classic						Mitchell Center; Mobile, AL
November 29, 2026*; 1:00 p.m., ESPN+		South Carolina State; Jaguar Classic						Mitchell Center; Mobile, AL
December 4, 2026*; 6:00 p.m., ESPN+		at North Florida						UNF Arena; Jacksonville, FL
December 6, 2026*; 1:00 p.m., SECN		at Vanderbilt						Memorial Gymnasium; Nashville, TN
December 13, 2026*; 1:00 p.m., ACCNX		at Florida State						Donald L. Tucker Civic Center; Tallahassee, FL
December 16, 2026; 6:00 p.m., ESPN+		at Southern Miss						Reed Green Coliseum; Hattiesburg, MS
December 19, 2026; 2:00 p.m., ESPN+		Marshall						Mitchell Center; Mobile, AL
December 28, 2026*; 6:00 p.m., SECN+		at Auburn						Neville Arena; Auburn, AL
December 31, 2026; 6:30 p.m., ESPN+		Georgia State						Mitchell Center; Mobile, AL
January 2, 2027; 1:00 p.m., ESPN+		Appalachian State						Mitchell Center; Mobile, AL
January 6, 2027; 5:00 p.m., ESPN+		at Georgia Southern						Hill Convocation Center; Statesboro, GA
January 9, 2027; 12:00 p.m., ESPN+		at Old Dominion						Chartway Arena; Norfolk, VA
January 13, 2027; 7:00 p.m., ESPN+		at Arkansas State						First National Bank Arena; Jonesboro, AR
January 16, 2027; 2:00 p.m., ESPN+		at Louisiana						Cajundome; Lafayette, LA
January 20, 2027; 11:30 a.m., ESPN+		Southern Miss						Mitchell Center; Mobile, AL
January 23, 2027; 2:00 p.m., ESPN+		Arkansas State						Mitchell Center; Mobile, AL
January 30, 2027; 12:00 p.m., ESPN+		at Coastal Carolina						HTC Center; Conway, SC
February 3, 2027; 6:00 p.m., ESPN+		at Troy						Trojan Arena; Troy, AL
February 6, 2027; TBA, ESPN+		TBD; MAC-SBC Challenge						Mitchell Center; Mobile, AL
February 11, 2027; 6:30 p.m., ESPN+		Louisiana Tech						Mitchell Center; Mobile, AL
February 13, 2027; 2:00 p.m., ESPN+		Troy						Mitchell Center; Mobile, AL
February 18, 2027; 6:30 p.m., ESPN+		at Louisiana–Monroe						b1Bank Fant Coliseum; Monroe, LA
February 20, 2027; 3:00 p.m., ESPN+		at Louisiana Tech						Thomas Assembly Center; Ruston, LA
February 24, 2027; 5:00 p.m., ESPN+		Louisiana						Mitchell Center; Mobile, AL
February 26, 2027; 6:30 p.m., ESPN+		Louisiana–Monroe						Mitchell Center; Mobile, AL
Sun Belt tournament
March 2–8, 2027; TBA		vs.						Pensacola Bay Center; Pensacola, FL
*Non-conference game. ^{#}Rankings from AP Poll. (#) Tournament seedings in parentheses. All times are in Central.
