= 2026–27 Louisiana Ragin' Cajuns women's basketball team =

American college basketball season

2026–27 Louisiana Ragin' Cajuns women's basketball
- Conference: Sun Belt Conference
- Record: 0–0 (0–0 Sun Belt)
- Head coach: Garry Brodhead (15th season)
- Associate head coach: Temeka Johnson
- Assistant coaches: Kacie Cryer; Marvin Harvey
- Home arena: Cajundome

2026–27 Sun Belt Conference women's basketball standings
	Conf.				Overall
Team	W		L	PCT	W		L	PCT
Appalachian State	0	–	0	–	0	–	0	–
Arkansas State	0	–	0	–	0	–	0	–
Coastal Carolina	0	–	0	–	0	–	0	–
Georgia Southern	0	–	0	–	0	–	0	–
Georgia State	0	–	0	–	0	–	0	–
James Madison	0	–	0	–	0	–	0	–
Louisiana	0	–	0	–	0	–	0	–
Louisiana–Monroe	0	–	0	–	0	–	0	–
Louisiana Tech	0	–	0	–	0	–	0	–
Marshall	0	–	0	–	0	–	0	–
Old Dominion	0	–	0	–	0	–	0	–
South Alabama	0	–	0	–	0	–	0	–
Southern Miss	0	–	0	–	0	–	0	–
Troy	0	–	0	–	0	–	0	–
† 2027 Sun Belt tournament winner

The 2026–27 Louisiana Ragin' Cajuns women's basketball team will represent the University of Louisiana at Lafayette during the 2026–27 NCAA Division I women's basketball season. The Ragin' Cajuns, led by fifteenth-year head coach Garry Brodhead, will play their home games at the Cajundome in Lafayette, Louisiana, and compete as a member of the Sun Belt Conference.

== Previous season ==
The Ragin' Cajuns finished the 2025–26 season 5–26 overall and 2–16 in Sun Belt play, to finish in last place in the conference. As the No. 14 seed in the Sun Belt tournament, they defeated No. 11 Georgia State 71–66 in the first round, before falling to No. 10 Louisiana–Monroe in the second round to end their season.

== Offseason ==
=== Departures ===
Louisiana departures
Name	Number	Pos.	Height	Year	Hometown	Reason for departure
Stephanie Mosley	3	Guard	6'0"	Senior	Mansfield, TX	Graduated
Zoriahn Davis	5	Guard	5'5"	Junior	New Iberia, LA	TBD; not listed on roster
Lily Ba	8	Forward	6'3"	Junior	Overland Park, KS	Transferred to Wichita State
Marina Artero	10	Forward	5'11"	Junior	Fontanilles, Spain	Transferred to Evansville
Bianca Silva	13	Guard	5'6"	Junior	Florianopolis, Brazil	Transferred to Lindenwood

=== Incoming transfers ===
Louisiana incoming transfers
Name	Number	Pos.	Height	Year	Hometown	Previous school
Malaya Jones	0	Guard	5'4"	Junior	Tucker, GA	Trinity Valley CC (NJCAA)
Kennedi Johnson	8	Guard	5'4"	Junior	Dallas, TX	Tyler JC (NJCAA)

=== Recruiting class ===
There was no 2026 recruiting class.

== Roster ==
Years are listed according to the new NCAA age-based eligibility model.

2026–27 Louisiana Ragin' Cajuns women's basketball team
Players
Coaches

Pos.	#	Name	Height	Year	Previous school	Hometown
G	0	Malaya Jones	5 ft 4 in (1.63 m)	Jr	Grayson High School; Trinity Valley CC	Tucker, GA
G	1	Kahlen Norris	5 ft 9 in (1.75 m)	Sr	The Colony High School; Hutchinson CC	The Colony, TX
G	2	Amijah Price	5 ft 8 in (1.73 m)	So	Woodlawn High School	Baton Rouge, LA
G	3	Janja Dragisic	5 ft 7 in (1.7 m)	Fr		Podgorica, Montenegro
G	4	Jazmyne Jackson	5 ft 7 in (1.7 m)	GS	Ray Braswell High School; Georgia Southern	Dallas, TX
G	5	Kennedi Johnson	5 ft 4 in (1.63 m)	Jr	Skyline High School; Tyler JC	Dallas, TX
G	10	Kelis Dansby	5 ft 8 in (1.73 m)	Fr	Jeffersonville High School	Jeffersonville, IN
F	11	Arionna Patterson	5 ft 11 in (1.8 m)	RS Fr	Walker High School	Baton Rouge, LA
G	13	Bailey Timmons	5 ft 7 in (1.7 m)	Fr	John Curtis Christian School	Slidell, LA
G	15	Imani Daniel	5 ft 9 in (1.75 m)	So	John Curtis Christian School	Gramercy, LA
F	20	Justyse George	5 ft 9 in (1.75 m)	Fr	Teurlings Catholic High School	Lafayette, LA
F	22	Aminata Sowe	6 ft 3 in (1.91 m)	Fr	Hamilton Heights Christian Academy	Dakar, Senegal
F/C	23	Kaylis Walker	6 ft 2 in (1.88 m)	Fr	Laurel High School	Laurel, MS
G	24	Mikaylah Manley	5 ft 8 in (1.73 m)	Sr	Barbe High School; Southern Miss	Lake Charles, LA
F	31	Ndiaba Lo	6 ft 3 in (1.91 m)	Fr	Guediawaye Basket Academy	Dakar, Senegal

Head coach

- Garry Brodhead (Louisiana)

Assistant coach(es)

- Temeka Johnson (LSU)
- Kacie Cryer (LSU Shreveport)
- Marvin Harvey (Ottawa)

Legend

- (C) Team captain
- (S) Suspended
- (I) Ineligible
- (W) Walk-on
- Injured
- Current redshirt

Roster
Last update: August 26, 2026

== Schedule and results ==
Date time, TV	Rank^{#}	Opponent^{#}	Result	Record	High points	High rebounds	High assists	Site (attendance) city, state
Exhibition
October 22, 2026*; 6:00 p.m.		LSU–Alexandria	W 100–62		15 – Lo	14 – Lo	4 – Jones	Cajundome; Lafayette, LA
October 29, 2026*; 6:00 p.m.		Mississippi Christian						Cajundome; Lafayette, LA
Regular season
November 3, 2026*; 6:00 p.m., ESPN+		Xavier (LA)						Cajundome; Lafayette, LA
November 5, 2026*; TBA		at Texas A&M						Cajundome; Lafayette, LA
November 11, 2026*; TBA		at East Texas A&M						The Field House; Commerce, TX
November 19, 2026*; 6:00 p.m., ESPN+		Tarleton State						Cajundome; Lafayette, LA
November 22, 2026*; TBA		at Southeastern Louisiana						University Center; Hammond, LA
November 24, 2026*; 5:00 p.m., ESPN+		Nicholls						Cajundome; Lafayette, LA
November 27, 2026*; TBA		Northwestern State						Prather Coliseum; Natchitoches, LA
November 29, 2026*; 4:00 p.m., ESPN+		Jackson State						Cajundome; Lafayette, LA
December 2, 2026*; TBA		at Morehead State						Ellis Johnson Arena; Morehead, KY
December 9, 2026*; TBA		at McNeese						Townsley Law Arena; Lake Charles, LA
December 13, 2026*; TBA		at Tulane						Devlin Fieldhouse; New Orleans, LA
December 16, 2026; TBA, ESPN+		at Louisiana Tech						Thomas Assembly Center; Ruston, LA
December 19, 2026; TBA, ESPN+		Coastal Carolina						Cajundome; Lafayette, LA
December 29, 2026*; 6:00 p.m., ESPN+		Dillard						Cajundome; Lafayette, LA
December 31, 2026; 2:00 p.m., ESPN+		Georgia Southern						Cajundome; Lafayette, LA
January 2, 2027; 2:00 p.m., ESPN+		Georgia State						Cajundome; Lafayette, LA
January 6, 2027; TBA, ESPN+		at Old Dominion						Chartway Arena; Norfolk, VA
January 9, 2027; TBA, ESPN+		at Marshall						Cam Henderson Center; Huntington, WV
January 14, 2027; 11:00 a.m., ESPN+		Louisiana–Monroe						Cajundome; Lafayette, LA
January 16, 2027; 2:00 p.m., ESPN+		South Alabama						Cajundome; Lafayette, LA
January 21, 2027; 5:00 p.m., ESPN+		Louisiana Tech						Cajundome; Lafayette, LA
January 23, 2027; TBA, ESPN+		Southern Miss						Cajundome; Lafayette, LA
January 28, 2027; TBA, ESPN+		at Arkansas State						First National Bank Arena; Jonesboro, AR
January 30, 2027; TBA, ESPN+		at Louisiana–Monroe						b1Bank Fant Coliseum; Monroe, LA
February 6, 2027; TBA, ESPN+		at Southern Miss						Reed Green Coliseum; Hattiesburg, MS
February 11, 2027; 6:00 p.m., ESPN+		Troy						Cajundome; Lafayette, LA
February 13, 2027; TBA, ESPN+		Arkansas State						Cajundome; Lafayette, LA
February 20, 2027; TBA, ESPN+		at James Madison						Atlantic Union Bank Center; Harrisonburg, VA
February 24, 2027; TBA, ESPN+		at South Alabama						Mitchell Center; Mobile, AL
February 26, 2027; TBA, ESPN+		at Troy						Trojan Arena; Troy, AL
Sun Belt tournament
March 2–8, 2027; TBA		vs.						Pensacola Bay Center; Pensacola, FL
*Non-conference game. ^{#}Rankings from AP Poll. (#) Tournament seedings in parentheses. All times are in Eastern.
