= 2026–27 Troy Trojans women's basketball team =

Intercollegiate basketball season

2026–27 Troy Trojans women's basketball
- Conference: Sun Belt Conference
- Record: 2–3 (0–0 Sun Belt)
- Head coach: Chanda Rigby (15th season)
- Associate head coach: Jennifer Graf
- Assistant coaches: Stephanie Murphy; Grace Daniels
- Home arena: Trojan Arena

2026–27 Sun Belt Conference women's basketball standings
	Conf.				Overall
Team	W		L	PCT	W		L	PCT
Louisiana Tech	0	–	0	–	4	–	1	.800
Marshall	0	–	0	–	4	–	1	.800
Southern Miss	0	–	0	–	4	–	1	.800
Appalachian State	0	–	0	–	3	–	1	.750
Coastal Carolina	0	–	0	–	3	–	1	.750
James Madison	0	–	0	–	3	–	2	.600
Old Dominion	0	–	0	–	3	–	2	.600
Georgia Southern	0	–	0	–	2	–	2	.500
Troy	0	–	0	–	2	–	3	.400
Louisiana	0	–	0	–	1	–	3	.250
Louisiana–Monroe	0	–	0	–	1	–	3	.250
Georgia State	0	–	0	–	1	–	4	.200
South Alabama	0	–	0	–	1	–	4	.200
Arkansas State	0	–	0	–	0	–	3	.000
† 2027 Sun Belt tournament winner As of November 17, 2026

The 2026–27 Troy Trojans women's basketball team will represent Troy University during the 2026–27 NCAA Division I women's basketball season. The Trojans, led by fifteenth-year head coach Chanda Rigby, will play their home games at the Trojan Arena in Troy, Alabama, and will compete as a member of the Sun Belt Conference.

== Previous season ==
The Trojans finished the 2025–26 season 25–8 overall and 15–3 in Sun Belt play, to finish in second place in the conference. As the No. 2 seed in the Sun Belt tournament, they earned a bye to the semifinals, where they defeated No. 3 Arkansas State 83–73 to advance to the conference championship game for the first time since 2022. They were unable to capture the Sun Belt title, as they fell to No. 4 James Madison 52–69.

Following the tournament elimination, the Trojans earned their first ever at-large bid to the WBIT, where they were unseeded in the Texas A&M Bracket. They lost 70–79 in the first round to No. 2 seeded Kansas to end their season.

== Offseason ==
=== Departures ===
Troy departures
Name	Number	Pos.	Height	Year	Hometown	Reason for departure
Ashley Baez	2	Guard	5'5"	Senior	Santo Domingo, Dominican Republic	Graduated
Emani Jenkins	3	Guard	5'10"	Senior	Dallas, TX	Graduated
Zay Dyer	4	Forward	6'2"	Senior	Atlanta, GA	Graduated
Kamesha Moore	8	Guard	5'7"	Senior	Pasadena, CA	Graduated
Fortuna Ngwano	12	Forward	6'0"	Senior	Bafoussam, Cameroon	Graduated
Lana Koricanac	14	Guard	5'11"	Freshman	Belgrade, Serbia	Transferred to Eastern Illinois
Jasmine Timmons	15	Forward	6'3"	Freshman	Houston, TX	Transferred to Trinity Valley CC (NJCAA) (Note: Did not play in the 2025–26 season.)
Rachel Leggett	22	Guard	5'8"	Senior	Navarre, FL	Graduated
Marianah Achol	25	Forward	6'4"	Freshman	Rumbek, South Sudan	Transferred to Texas Southern
Leilani Guion	35	Guard	5'10"	Senior	Orlando, FL	Graduated

=== Incoming transfers ===
Troy incoming transfers
Name	Number	Pos.	Height	Year	Hometown	Previous school
Rianna Callihan	3	Forward	6'4"	Junior	St. Petersburg, FL	Miami Dade (NJCAA)
Aniya Hubbard	4	Guard	5'9"	5th year	Hoover, AL	Florida Atlantic (Note: Sat out her 2024–25 season at UAB with an injury, did not play in the 2025–26 season.)
Tayla Barros	7	Guard	5'9"	Senior	Boston, MA	Harcum (NJCAA)
Aniya Finger	24	Forward	6'0"	5th year	Charlotte, NC	North Carolina Central
Taliah Martin	33	Forward	6'1"	Junior	Irving, TX	Collin (NJCAA)

=== Recruiting class ===
There was no 2026 recruiting class.

== Roster ==
Years are listed according to the new NCAA age-based eligibility model.

2026–27 Troy Trojans women's basketball team
Players
Coaches

Pos.	#	Name	Height	Year	Previous school	Hometown
F	0	Detavia Salter (5th)	6 ft 2 in (1.88 m)	Sr	Bainbridge High School; Georgia Southwestern State	Colquitt, GA
G	1	Saniya Jackson	5 ft 8 in (1.73 m)	So	Park Crossing High School	Montgomery, AL
G	2	Tiauna King	5 ft 8 in (1.73 m)	Fr	Pelham High School	Pelham, AL
F	3	Riana Callihan	6 ft 4 in (1.93 m)	Jr	Lakewood High School; Miami Dade College	St. Petersburg, FL
G	4	Aniya Hubbard (5th)	5 ft 9 in (1.75 m)	Sr	Hoover High School; Florida Atlantic	Hoover, AL
G	5	Hannah Smith	6 ft 0 in (1.83 m)	Fr	Montgomery Catholic Preparatory School	Montgomery, AL
G	6	Shakirah Edwards	5 ft 10 in (1.78 m)	Jr	Rutherford High School; Mississippi State	Panama City, FL
G	7	Tayla Barros	5 ft 9 in (1.75 m)	Sr	Cathedral High School; Harcum College	Boston, MA
F	8	Jamonca Chambers	6 ft 4 in (1.93 m)	Fr	Vigor High School	Mobile, AL
G	11	Kilmora Hughes	5 ft 8 in (1.73 m)	Fr	Meridian High School	Meridian, MS
F	12	Maliyah Meeks	6 ft 1 in (1.85 m)	Fr	Parks Crossing High School	Montgomery, AL
F	24	Aniya Finger (5th)	6 ft 0 in (1.83 m)	Sr	Hopewell High School; North Carolina	Charlotte, NC
F	33	Taliah Martin	6 ft 1 in (1.85 m)	Jr	Irving High School; Collin College	Irving, TX

Head coach

- Chanda Rigby (Nova Southeastern)

Assistant coach(es)

- Jennifer Graf (Northwestern State)
- Stephanie Murphy (Mississippi)
- Grace Daniels (Texas–San Antonio)
- Hailey Kuhns (LSU)

Legend

- (C) Team captain
- (S) Suspended
- (I) Ineligible
- (W) Walk-on
- (5th) Fifth year senior
- Injured
- Current redshirt

Roster
Last update: September 6, 2026

== Schedule and results ==
Date time, TV	Rank^{#}	Opponent^{#}	Result	Record	High points	High rebounds	High assists	Site (attendance) city, state
Exhibition
October 27, 2026; 6:00 p.m.		Tuskegee	W 79–57		–	–	–	Trojan Arena; Troy, AL
Regular season
November 2, 2026; 6:00 p.m.		at Kent State; MAC–SBC Challenge	W 89–78	1–0	21 – King	7 – Smith	5 – Jackson	MAC Center (923); Kent, OH
November 5, 2026; 6:00 p.m., ESPN+		Thomas	W 104–36	2–0	26 – Smith	8 – Hubbard	7 – Jackson	Trojan Arena (1,887); Troy, AL
November 11, 2026; 6:30 p.m., SECN+		at Mississippi State	L 57–79	2–1	16 – Smith	8 – Hubbard	3 – Tied	Humphrey Coliseum (3,874); Starkville, MS
November 13, 2026; 11:00 a.m., ESPN+		at Belmont	L 46–72	2–2	11 – Hubbard	10 – Smith	3 – Edwards	Curb Event Center (643); Nashville, TN
November 16, 2026; 7:00 p.m., SECN+		at No. 9 LSU	L 70–116	2–3	18 – Hubbard	7 – Hubbard	3 – Tied	Pete Maravich Assembly Center (9,178); Baton Rouge, LA
November 19, 2026; 6:00 p.m., ESPN+		Longwood						Trojan Arena; Troy, AL
November 27, 2026; 5:30 p.m.		vs. UC Davis; Nugget Classic						Lawlor Events Center; Reno, NV
November 29, 2026; 3:00 p.m.		at Nevada; Nugget Classic						Lawlor Events Center; Reno, NV
December 5, 2026; 2:00 p.m., ESPN+		Alabama State						Trojan Arena; Troy, AL
December 12, 2026; 3:15 p.m.		vs. Colorado State; San Diego MTE						Jenny Craig Pavilion; San Diego, CA
December 13, 2026; 1:00 p.m.		vs. Oral Roberts; San Diego MTE						Jenny Craig Pavilion; San Diego, CA
December 16, 2026; 5:15 p.m., ESPN+		Louisiana–Monroe						Trojan Arena; Troy, AL
December 19, 2026; 1:00 p.m., ESPN+		at Georgia State						Georgia State Convocation Center; Atlanta, GA
December 30, 2026; 6:00 p.m., ESPN+		Marshall						Trojan Arena; Troy, AL
January 2, 2027; 3:30 p.m., ESPN+		James Madison						Trojan Arena; Troy, AL
January 6, 2027; 5:00 p.m., ESPN+		at Coastal Carolina						HTC Center; Conway, SC
January 9, 2027; 1:00 p.m., ESPN+		at Georgia Southern						Hanner Fieldhouse; Statesboro, GA
January 13, 2027; 5:00 p.m., ESPN+		at Southern Miss						Reed Green Coliseum; Hattiesburg, MS
January 16, 2027; TBA, ESPN+		at Arkansas State						First National Bank Arena; Jonesboro, AR
January 23, 2027; 3:30 p.m., ESPN+		Appalachian State						Trojan Arena; Troy, AL
January 28, 2027; 6:30 p.m., ESPN+		at Louisiana–Monroe						b1Bank Fant Coliseum; Monroe, LA
January 30, 2027; 5:30 p.m., ESPN+		at Louisiana Tech						Thomas Assembly Center; Ruston, LA
February 3, 2027; 6:00 p.m., ESPN+		South Alabama						Trojan Arena; Troy, AL
February 6, 2027*; 3:30 p.m., ESPN+		TBD; MAC–SBC Challenge						Trojan Arena; Troy, AL
February 11, 2027; 6:00 p.m., ESPN+		at Louisiana						Cajundome; Lafayette, LA
February 13, 2027; 2:00 p.m., ESPN+		at South Alabama						Mitchell Center; Mobile, AL
February 17, 2027; 6:00 p.m., ESPN+		Southern Miss						Trojan Arena; Troy, AL
February 20, 2027; 2:00 p.m., ESPN+		Arkansas State						Trojan Arena; Troy, AL
February 23, 2027; 6:00 p.m., ESPN+		Louisiana Tech						Trojan Arena; Troy, AL
February 26, 2027; 6:00 p.m., ESPN+		Louisiana						Trojan Arena; Troy, AL
Sun Belt tournament
March 2–8, 2027; TBA		vs.						Pensacola Bay Center; Pensacola, FL
*Non-conference game. ^{#}Rankings from AP Poll. (#) Tournament seedings in parentheses. All times are in Central.
