= 2026–27 Appalachian State Mountaineers women's basketball team =

American college basketball season

2026–27 Appalachian State Mountaineers women's basketball
- Conference: Sun Belt Conference
- Record: 3–1 (0–0 Sun Belt)
- Head coach: Alaura Sharp (3rd season)
- Assistant coaches: Rabun Wright; Brooklyn Taylor; Joel Harrison; LaRomeo McKee; Nahja Scott
- Home arena: Holmes Convocation Center

2026–27 Sun Belt Conference women's basketball standings
	Conf.				Overall
Team	W		L	PCT	W		L	PCT
Louisiana Tech	0	–	0	–	4	–	0	1.000
Marshall	0	–	0	–	4	–	0	1.000
Appalachian State	0	–	0	–	3	–	0	1.000
Coastal Carolina	0	–	0	–	3	–	0	1.000
Old Dominion	0	–	0	–	3	–	1	.750
Southern Miss	0	–	0	–	3	–	1	.750
James Madison	0	–	0	–	2	–	2	.500
Troy	0	–	0	–	2	–	2	.500
Georgia Southern	0	–	0	–	1	–	2	.333
Louisiana	0	–	0	–	1	–	2	.333
Louisiana–Monroe	0	–	0	–	1	–	2	.333
Georgia State	0	–	0	–	1	–	3	.250
South Alabama	0	–	0	–	1	–	3	.250
Arkansas State	0	–	0	–	0	–	3	.000
† 2027 Sun Belt tournament winner As of November 15, 2026

The 2026–27 Appalachian State Mountaineers women's basketball team will represent Appalachian State University during the 2026–27 NCAA Division I women's basketball season. The Mountaineers, led by third-year head coach Alaura Sharp, will play their home games at the Holmes Convocation Center in Boone, North Carolina, and compete as a member of the Sun Belt Conference.

== Previous season ==
The Mountaineers finished the 2025–26 season 11–19 overall and 4–14 in Sun Belt play, to finish in thirteenth in the conference. As the No. 12 seed in the Sun Belt tournament, they lost 57–68 to No. 12 South Alabama in the first round to end their season.

== Offseason ==
=== Departures ===
Appalachian State departures
Name	Number	Pos.	Height	Year	Hometown	Reason for departure
Emma Smith	0	Guard	5'7"	Senior	Vestavia Hills, AL	Graduated
Jada Burton	10	Guard	5'8"	Graduate student	Spartanburg, SC	Graduated
Elana Pericic	20	Forward	6'1"	Senior	Rijeka, Croatia	Graduated
Zoë McCrary	32	Forward	6'2"	Graduate student	Allen, TX	Graduated
Emily Hege	34	Guard	5'7"	Senior	Lexington, NC	Graduated
Marta Gutierrez	54	Guard	5'7"	Junior	Dénia, Spain	Entered transfer portal

=== Incoming transfers ===
Appalachian State incoming transfers
Name	Number	Pos.	Height	Year	Hometown	Previous school
Camiah Muldrow	1	Guard	5'7"	Sophomore	Fairburn, GA	Cloud County CC (NJCAA)
Joi Williams	4	Guard	5'6"	Senior	Leesburg, VA	Radford
Raven Preston	5	Guard	5'11"	Senior	Greensboro, NC	Wake Forest
Torin Rogers	6	Guard	6'1"	Senior	Brasstown, NC	UNC Wilmington
Jadyn Atchinson	13	Guard	6'1"	Senior	Dallas, TX	UT Arlington

=== Recruiting class ===
There was no 2026 recruiting class.

== Roster ==
Years are listed according to the new NCAA age-based eligibility model.

2026–27 Appalachian State Mountaineers women's basketball team
Players
Coaches

Pos.	#	Name	Height	Year	Previous school	Hometown
G	1	Camiah Muldrow	5 ft 7 in (1.7 m)	So	Link Academy; Cloud County CC	Fairburn, GA
G	2	Jayden McBride	5 ft 10 in (1.78 m)	Jr	Cathedral Preparatory School; Georgetown	Erie, PA
G	3	Isa Roman	5 ft 8 in (1.73 m)	Fr	Grace Christian School	Cary, NC
G	4	Joi Williams	5 ft 6 in (1.68 m)	Sr	Virginia Academy; Radford	Leesburg, VA
G	5	Raven Preston	5 ft 11 in (1.8 m)	Sr	Southeast Guilford High School; Wake Forest	Greensboro, NC
G	6	Torin Rogers	6 ft 1 in (1.85 m)	Sr	Murphy High School; Wake Forest	Brasstown, NC
G	10	Jaida McClure	5 ft 9 in (1.75 m)	Fr	Providence Day School	Charlotte, NC
F	11	Zoe Smith	6 ft 2 in (1.88 m)	Fr	Chapel Hill High School	Durham, NC
G	13	Jaydn Atchison	6 ft 1 in (1.85 m)	Sr	Cedar Hill High School; UT Arlington	Dallas, TX
F	17	Feryal Defne Atli	6 ft 3 in (1.91 m)	Jr	Ankara Ari College; West Virginia	Mersin, Türkiye
G	23	Riley Stoker	6 ft 0 in (1.83 m)	So	Somerset Prep North Lauderdale	Davie, FL
G	24	Daisia Mitchell	6 ft 0 in (1.83 m)	Sr	Etiwanda High School; Mt. San Antonio College	Riverside, CA
F	30	Addie Biel	6 ft 2 in (1.88 m)	So	Cathedral Preparatory School	Erie, PA

Head coach

- Alaura Sharp (Southwest Minnesota State)

Assistant coach(es)

- Rabun Wright (North Alabama)
- Brooklyn Taylor (Saint Francis (PA))
- Joel Harrison (Faulkner)
- LaRomeo McKee (Southern Miss)
- Nahja Scott (LSU New Orleans)

Legend

- (C) Team captain
- (S) Suspended
- (I) Ineligible
- (W) Walk-on
- Injured
- Current redshirt

Roster
Last update: August 25, 2026

== Schedule and results ==
Date time, TV	Rank^{#}	Opponent^{#}	Result	Record	High points	High rebounds	High assists	Site (attendance) city, state
Regular season
November 2, 2026*; TBA		at Eastern Michigan; MAC–SBC Challenge						George Gervin GameAbove Center; Ypsilanti, MI
November 4, 2026*; TBA		Montreat						Holmes Convocation Center; Boone, NC
November 11, 2026*; TBA		at Davidson						John M. Belk Arena; Davidson, NC
November 14, 2026*; TBA		vs. Northwestern; Greenbrier Tip-Off						Colonial Hall; White Sulphur Springs, WV
November 19, 2026*; TBA		at Wake Forest						LJVM Coliseum; Winston-Salem, NC
November 23, 2026*; TBA		at Norfolk State						Echols Hall; Norfolk, VA
November 27, 2026*; TBA		UNC Asheville; Appalachian State Tournament						Holmes Convocation Center; Boone, NC
November 28, 2026*; TBA		Western Carolina; Appalachian State Tournament						Holmes Convocation Center; Boone, NC
December 2, 2026*; TBA		at Elon						Schar Center; Elon, NC
December 9, 2026*; TBA		at Virginia Tech						Cassell Coliseum; Blacksburg, VA
December 12, 2026*; TBA		Florida Gulf Coast						Holmes Convocation Center; Boone, NC
December 16, 2026; TBA		at Marshall						Cam Henderson Center; Huntington, WV
December 19, 2026; TBA		Louisiana Tech						Holmes Convocation Center; Boone, NC
December 22, 2026*; TBA		Carolina						Holmes Convocation Center; Boone, NC
December 31, 2026; TBA		at Southern Miss						Reed Green Coliseum; Hattiesburg, MS
January 2, 2027; TBA		at South Alabama						Mitchell Center; Mobile, AL
January 7, 2027; TBA		Louisiana–Monroe						Holmes Convocation Center; Boone, NC
January 9, 2027; TBA		Arkansas State						Holmes Convocation Center; Boone, NC
January 14, 2027; TBA		Old Dominion						Holmes Convocation Center; Boone, NC
January 16, 2027; TBA		Georgia State						Holmes Convocation Center; Boone, NC
January 23, 2027; TBA		at Troy						Trojan Arena; Troy, AL
January 28, 2027; TBA		Georgia Southern						Holmes Convocation Center; Boone, NC
January 30, 2027; TBA		Marshall						Holmes Convocation Center; Boone, NC
February 3, 2027; TBA		at Coastal Carolina						HTC Center; Conway, SC
February 6, 2027*; TBA		TBD; MAC–SBC Challenge						Holmes Convocation Center; Boone, NC
February 10, 2027; TBA		James Madison						Holmes Convocation Center; Boone, NC
February 13, 2027; TBA		Coastal Carolina; Senior Day						Holmes Convocation Center; Boone, NC
February 17, 2027; TBA		at Georgia State						GSU Convocation Center; Atlanta, GA
February 20, 2027; TBA		at Old Dominion						Chartway Arena; Norfolk, VA
February 23, 2027; TBA		at Georgia Southern						Hill Convocation Center; Statesboro, GA
February 26, 2027; TBA		at James Madison						Atlantic Union Bank Center; Harrisonburg, VA
Sun Belt tournament
March 2–8, 2027; TBA		vs.						Pensacola Bay Center; Pensacola, FL
*Non-conference game. ^{#}Rankings from AP Poll. (#) Tournament seedings in parentheses. All times are in Central.
