= 2026–27 James Madison Dukes women's basketball team =

American collegiate basketball season

2026–27 James Madison Dukes women's basketball
- Conference: Sun Belt Conference
- Record: 3–4 (0–0 Sun Belt)
- Head coach: Sean O'Regan (11th season)
- Associate head coach: Nicole Razor
- Assistant coaches: Kayla Cooper-Williams; Alex Tomlinson; Anastasiia Zakharova
- Home arena: Atlantic Union Bank Center

2026–27 Sun Belt Conference women's basketball standings
	Conf.				Overall
Team	W		L	PCT	W		L	PCT
Louisiana Tech	0	–	0	–	5	–	1	.833
Southern Miss	0	–	0	–	5	–	1	.833
Appalachian State	0	–	0	–	4	–	1	.800
Marshall	0	–	0	–	5	–	2	.714
Coastal Carolina	0	–	0	–	3	–	2	.600
Georgia Southern	0	–	0	–	3	–	3	.500
James Madison	0	–	0	–	3	–	3	.500
Old Dominion	0	–	0	–	3	–	3	.500
Louisiana	0	–	0	–	2	–	3	.400
Troy	0	–	0	–	2	–	4	.333
Arkansas State	0	–	0	–	1	–	3	.250
Georgia State	0	–	0	–	1	–	4	.200
Louisiana–Monroe	0	–	0	–	1	–	4	.200
South Alabama	0	–	0	–	1	–	5	.167
† 2027 Sun Belt tournament winner As of November 22, 2026

The 2026–27 James Madison Dukes women's basketball team currently represents James Madison University during the 2026–27 NCAA Division I women's basketball season. The Dukes, led by eleventh-year head coach Sean O'Regan, play their home games at the Atlantic Union Bank Center in Harrisonburg, Virginia and are competing in their final season as a member of the Sun Belt Conference before their move to the American Conference in 2027.

== Previous season ==
The Dukes finished the 2025–26 season 26–9 overall and 14–4 in Sun Belt play, to finish in a tie for third in the conference with Arkansas State. As the No. 4 seed in the Sun Belt tournament, they earned a bye to the quarterfinals, where they defeated No. 12 South Alabama 79–54 to advance to the semifinal game. They then routed top-seeded Georgia Southern 81–53, the largest margin of victory of any game in the tournament, to advance to their fourth consecutive championship game. Finally, the Dukes defeated No. 2 Troy 69–52 to once again capture the Sun Belt title and earn the conference's at-large bid to the NCAA tournament, both for the first time since 2023.

In the tournament, the Dukes were seeded No. 12 in the Fort Worth #3 Regional. They lost in the first round to No. 5 seed and No. 16 nationally ranked Kentucky in the first round by a score of 56–71.

== Offseason ==
=== Departures ===
James Madison departures
Name	Num.	Pos.	Height	Year	Hometown	Reason for departure
Peyton McDaniel	00	Guard	6'0"	(redshirt) Senior	Birdsboro, PA	Graduated
Kylie Marshall	2	Guard	5'11"	Junior	Mansfield, TX	Transferred to Southern Miss
Ashanti Barnes	5	Forward	6'2"	Graduate student	Norfolk, VA	Graduated
Angela Williams	10	Guard/Forward	6'0"	Sophomore	New Orleans, LA	Transferred to UMBC
Maddie Oliver	13	Guard	6'0"	Freshman	Norwell, MA	Transferred to Loyola Maryland
Regina Walton	14	Guard	5'4"	Senior	Capitol Heights, MD	Graduated

=== Incoming transfers ===
James Madison incoming transfers
Name	Num.	Pos.	Height	Year	Hometown	Previous school
Trynce Taylor	2	Forward	6'2"	(redshirt) Junior	Alpharetta, GA	Kennesaw State
JaQuoia Jones-Brown	30	Guard	5'5"	Junior	Atlanta, GA	Long Beach
Trinity Moore	33	Forward	6'1"	(redshirt) Senior	Oklahoma City, OK	Stephen F. Austin (Note: Did not play in the 2025–26 season.)

=== Recruiting class ===
College recruiting
Name	Hometown	School	Height	Weight	Commit date
Maddie Leach; G	Newport News, VA	Menchville High School	5 ft 9 in (1.75 m)	N/A	
Maddie Leach; G	Recruit ratings: 247Sports:				
Overall recruit ranking:
Note: In many cases, Scout, Rivals, 247Sports, On3, and ESPN may conflict in their listings of height and weight.; In these cases, the average was taken. ESPN grades are on a 100-point scale.; Sources:

== Roster ==
Years are listed according to the new NCAA age-based eligibility model.

2026–27 James Madison Dukes women's basketball team
Players
Coaches

Pos.	#	Name	Height	Year	Previous school	Hometown
G	1	Maddie Leach	5 ft 9 in (1.75 m)	Fr	Menchville High School	Newport News, VA
F	2	Trynce Taylor	6 ft 2 in (1.88 m)	Sr	St. Francis High School; Kennesaw State	Alpharetta, GA
G	3	Reagan Edell	5 ft 10 in (1.78 m)	Fr	John Handley High School	Winchester, VA
G	4	Delilah Soltys	5 ft 11 in (1.8 m)	So	Mauldin High School	Fountain Inn, SC
F	5	Demi Gilliam	6 ft 1 in (1.85 m)	Fr	Paul VI Catholic High School	Gainesville, VA
G/F	10	Kinley Lewis	6 ft 1 in (1.85 m)	Fr	Billy Ryan High School	Denton, TX
G	11	Bree Robinson	5 ft 8 in (1.73 m)	Sr	The Webb School; Michigan State	Mississauga, Ontario
F	12	Jemma Eleby	6 ft 0 in (1.83 m)	So	Catholic High School	Virginia Beach, VA
G	21	Zakiya Stephenson	5 ft 4 in (1.63 m)	Sr	Princess Anne High School; Ole Miss	Virginia Beach, VA
F	22	Grace McDonough	6 ft 2 in (1.88 m)	So	Lansdale Catholic High School	Harleysville, PA
F	25	Brianna McLeod (5th)	6 ft 3 in (1.91 m)	Sr	King's Christian Collegiate; SMU	Brampton, Ontario
G	30	JaQuoia Jones-Brown	5 ft 5 in (1.65 m)	Jr	Westlake High School; Long Beach State	Atlanta, GA
F	33	Trinity Moore (6th)	6 ft 1 in (1.85 m)	RS Sr	Jones High School; Stephen F. Austin	Oklahoma City, OK

Head coach

- Sean O'Regan (James Madison)

Assistant coach(es)

- Nicole Razor (Elon)
- Kayla Cooper Williams (James Madison)
- Alex Tomlinson (Wingate)
- Anastasiia Zakharova (Charleston (WV))

Legend

- (C) Team captain
- (S) Suspended
- (I) Ineligible
- (W) Walk-on
- (5th) Fifth year senior
- (6th) Sixth year senior
- Injured
- Current redshirt

Roster
Last update: November 20, 2026

== Schedule and results ==
Date time, TV	Rank^{#}	Opponent^{#}	Result	Record	High points	High rebounds	High assists	Site (attendance) city, state
Regular season
November 2, 2026*; 7:00 p.m., ESPN+		at Miami (OH); MAC–SBC Challenge	L 52–59	0–1	12 – Robinson	9 – Moore	2 – Tied	Millett Hall (472); Oxford, OH
November 5, 2026*; 6:00 p.m., ESPN+		Central Connecticut	W 77–38	1–1	13 – Stephenson	6 – Tied	4 – Tied	Atlantic Union Bank Center (2,161); Harrisonburg, VA
November 8, 2026*; 6:00 p.m., ACCNX		at Virginia Tech	L 43–59	1–2	11 – Moore	5 – Tied	3 – Tied	Cassell Coliseum (5,189); Blacksburg, VA
November 11, 2026*; 6:00 p.m., ESPN+		Navy	W 77–61	2–2	16 – Moore	11 – Moore	6 – Robinson	Atlantic Union Bank Center (2,338); Harrisonburg, VA
November 15, 2026*; 1:00 p.m., ESPN+		East Carolina	W 76–54	3–2	16 – Moore	11 – Moore	6 – Stephenson	Atlantic Union Bank Center (2,381); Harrisonburg, VA
November 19, 2026*; 6:00 p.m., ACCN		at Virginia	L 51–60	3–3	14 – Moore	5 – Tied	5 – Stephenson	John Paul Jones Arena (4,246); Charlottesville, VA
November 21, 2026*; 12:00 pm		at George Mason	L 52−55	3−4	14 – Stephenson	9 – Tied	4 – Robinson	EagleBank Arena (1,182); Fairfax, VA
November 24, 2026*; 4:00 p.m., BallerTV		vs. Winthrop; San Diego Classic						Viejas Arena; San Diego, CA
November 25, 2026*; 6:30 p.m., BallerTV		vs. Arkansas; San Diego Classic						Viejas Arena; San Diego, CA
December 2, 2026*; TBA		at Penn State						Bryce Jordan Center; State College, PA
December 5, 2026*; 2:00 p.m., ESPN+		Bucknell						Atlantic Union Bank Center; Harrisonburg, VA
December 8, 2026*; 7:00 p.m.		at Liberty						Liberty Arena; Lynchburg, VA
December 13, 2026*; 2:00 p.m., ESPN+		High Point						Atlantic Union Bank Center; Harrisonburg, VA
December 19, 2026; 3:00 p.m., ESPN+		at Louisiana–Monroe						b1Bank Fant Coliseum; Monroe, LA
December 22, 2026; 12:00 p.m., ESPN+		Georgia Southern						Atlantic Union Bank Center; Harrisonburg, VA
December 30, 2026; TBA, ESPN+		at Arkansas State						First National Bank Arena; Jonesboro, AR
January 2, 2027; TBA, ESPN+		at Troy						Trojan Arena; Troy, AL
January 6, 2027; 6:00 p.m., ESPN+		Southern Miss						Atlantic Union Bank Center; Harrisonburg, VA
January 9, 2027; 2:00 p.m., ESPN+		Louisiana Tech						Atlantic Union Bank Center; Harrisonburg, VA
January 13, 2027; 6:00 p.m., ESPN+		at Coastal Carolina						HTC Center; Conway, SC
January 16, 2027; 2:00 p.m., ESPN+		at Marshall						Cam Henderson Center; Huntington, WV
January 20, 2027; TBA, ESPN+		at Old Dominion						Chartway Arena; Norfolk, VA
January 23, 2027; TBA, ESPN+		at Georgia State						GSU Convocation Center; Atlanta, GA
January 28, 2027; 6:00 p.m., ESPN+		Marshall						Atlantic Union Bank Center; Harrisonburg, VA
January 30, 2027; 2:00 p.m., ESPN+		Old Dominion						Atlantic Union Bank Center; Harrisonburg, VA
February 3, 2027; 6:00 p.m., ESPN+		Georgia State						Atlantic Union Bank Center; Harrisonburg, VA
February 6, 2027*; 2:00 p.m., ESPN+		TBD; MAC–SBC Challenge						Atlantic Union Bank Center; Harrisonburg, VA
February 10, 2027; TBA, ESPN+		at Appalachian State						Holmes Center; Boone, NC
February 13, 2027; 2:00 p.m., ESPN+		at Georgia Southern						Hill Convocation Center; Statesboro, GA
February 20, 2027; 2:00 p.m., ESPN+		Louisiana						Atlantic Union Bank Center; Harrisonburg, VA
February 23, 2027; 5:00 p.m., ESPN+		Coastal Carolina						Atlantic Union Bank Center; Harrisonburg, VA
February 26, 2027; 6:00 p.m., ESPN+		Appalachian State						Atlantic Union Bank Center; Harrisonburg, VA
Sun Belt tournament
March 2–8, 2027; TBA		vs.						Pensacola Bay Center; Pensacola, FL
*Non-conference game. ^{#}Rankings from AP Poll. (#) Tournament seedings in parentheses. All times are in Eastern.
