= 2026–27 Marshall Thundering Herd women's basketball team =

American college basketball season

2026–27 Marshall Thundering Herd women's basketball
- Conference: Sun Belt Conference
- Record: 5–2 (0–0 Sun Belt)
- Head coach: Juli Fulks (3rd season)
- Assistant coaches: Mykasa Lucas; Patrick Herlihy; Cassie Lastivka; Tim Whitesel
- Home arena: Cam Henderson Center

2026–27 Sun Belt Conference women's basketball standings
	Conf.				Overall
Team	W		L	PCT	W		L	PCT
Louisiana Tech	0	–	0	–	5	–	1	.833
Southern Miss	0	–	0	–	5	–	1	.833
Appalachian State	0	–	0	–	4	–	1	.800
Marshall	0	–	0	–	5	–	2	.714
Coastal Carolina	0	–	0	–	3	–	2	.600
Georgia Southern	0	–	0	–	3	–	3	.500
James Madison	0	–	0	–	3	–	3	.500
Old Dominion	0	–	0	–	3	–	3	.500
Louisiana	0	–	0	–	2	–	3	.400
Troy	0	–	0	–	2	–	4	.333
Arkansas State	0	–	0	–	1	–	3	.250
Georgia State	0	–	0	–	1	–	4	.200
Louisiana–Monroe	0	–	0	–	1	–	4	.200
South Alabama	0	–	0	–	1	–	5	.167
† 2027 Sun Belt tournament winner As of November 21, 2026

The 2026–27 Marshall Thundering Herd women's basketball team will represent Marshall University during the 2026–27 NCAA Division I women's basketball season. The Thundering Herd, led by third-year head coach Juli Fulks, will play their home games at Cam Henderson Center in Huntington, West Virginia and compete as a member of the Sun Belt Conference.

== Previous season ==
The Thundering Herd finished the 2025–26 season 28–9 overall and 13–5 in Sun Belt play, to finish in fifth in the conference. As the No. 5 seed in the Sun Belt tournament, they earned a bye to the fourth round, where they were upset 58–73 by South Alabama.

Following the tournament elimination, the Thundering Herd accepted an at-large bid to the WNIT, making it their second ever appearance in the tournament, their last coming ten years prior in 2016. It was also their first postseason appearance since the team made it to the 2024 NCAA tournament.

In the WNIT, they earned a bye to Round 2, where they defeated UMBC 66–53. They defeated Youngstown State and Army in the Super 16 and Great 8 respectively, moving onto the Fab 4, where they beat fellow Sun Belt member Arkansas State 69–62. Marshall defeated Illinois State 66–41 in the championship game to capture their first WNIT title. Their 28 wins set a single-season record, beating the 2023–24 team's record of 26.

== Offseason ==
=== Departures ===
Marshall departures
Name	Number	Pos.	Height	Year	Hometown	Reason for departure
Timberlynn Yeast	0	Forward/Guard	5'9"	(redshirt) Sophomore	Harrodsburg, KY	Transferred to Robert Morris
TreShonda Williams	1	Forward	6'2"	Senior	Flint, MI	Graduated
Blessing King	2	Guard	5'10"	Senior	Columbus, OH	Graduated
Timaya Lewis-Eutsey	3	Guard	5'8"	Senior	Trenton, NJ	Transferred to Florida State
Peyton Ilderton	20	Guard	5'6"	Senior	Logan, WV	Graduated
Meredith Maier	23	Forward	6'0"	Senior	Fairmont, WV	Graduated
Aarionna Redman	30	Forward/Guard	5'10"	Senior	Pickerington, OH	Graduated

=== Incoming transfers ===
Marshall incoming transfers
Name	Number	Pos.	Height	Year	Hometown	Previous school
Anaya Harris	0	Guard	5'9"	Senior	Raleigh, NC	Gardner–Webb
Paris Gilmore	3	Guard	5'7"	Senior	Youngstown, OH	UMass Lowell
Princess Cassell	14	Guard	5'9"	Junior	Eastvale, CA	Cal State San Bernardino (D-II)
Cassie Gallagher	25	Guard	5'11"	(redshirt) Junior	Cookeville, TN	USC Upstate
Maddie Moody	30	Forward	6'1"	Sophomore	Kettering, OH	Northern Kentucky

=== Recruiting class ===
There was no 2026 recruiting class.

== Roster ==
2026–27 Marshall Thundering Herd women's basketball team
Players
Coaches

Pos.	#	Name	Height	Year	Previous school	Hometown
G	0	Anaya Harris	5 ft 9 in (1.75 m)	Sr	Gardner–Webb	Raleigh, NC
G	3	Paris Gilmore	5 ft 7 in (1.7 m)	Sr	UMass Lowell	Youngstown, OH
F	4	Zenthia Stowers	6 ft 0 in (1.83 m)	So	Westlake Girls High School	Auckland, New Zealand
G	5	Olivia Olson	5 ft 10 in (1.78 m)	So	New Smyrna Beach High School	New Smyrna Beach, FL
F	8	Elizabeth Hunt	6 ft 0 in (1.83 m)	Fr	Upper Arlington High School	Columbus, OH
F	13	Leyocha Marigney	6 ft 3 in (1.91 m)	Sr	Reedley College	Fresno, CA
G	14	Princess Cassell	5 ft 9 in (1.75 m)	Jr	Cal State San Bernardino	Eastvale, CA
G	15	Ni'Kiah Chesterfield	6 ft 0 in (1.83 m)	Sr	Tusculum	Murfreesboro, TN
G	21	Emari Doby	5 ft 10 in (1.78 m)	Sr	Illinois–Springfield	Topeka, KS
G	22	Emily Bratton	5 ft 7 in (1.7 m)	Jr	Miami (OH)	Carroll, OH
G	23	Bri Wilkins	5 ft 10 in (1.78 m)	Fr	Sacred Heart Academy	Louisville, KY
G	24	Kassie Ingram	5 ft 11 in (1.8 m)	Jr	Kings High School	Cincinnati, OH
G	25	Cassie Gallagher	5 ft 11 in (1.8 m)	RS Jr	USC Upstate	Cookeville, TN
F	30	Maddie Moody	6 ft 1 in (1.85 m)	So	Northern Kentucky	Kettering, OH

Head coach

- Juli Fulks (Capital)

Assistant coach(es)

- Mykasa Lucas (Louisville)
- Patrick Herlihy (Syracuse)
- Cassie Lastivka (Ohio Northern)
- Tim Whitesel (Fredonia State)

Legend

- (C) Team captain
- (S) Suspended
- (I) Ineligible
- (W) Walk-on
- Injured
- Current redshirt

Roster
Last update: August 31, 2026

== Schedule and results ==
Date time, TV	Rank^{#}	Opponent^{#}	Result	Record	High points	High rebounds	High assists	Site (attendance) city, state
Exhibition
October 16, 2026*; 6:00 p.m.		UPIKE	W 84–49		–	–	–	Cam Henderson Center; Huntington, WV
October 27, 2026*; 6:00 p.m.		Kentucky Christian	W 95–46		–	–	–	Cam Henderson Center; Huntington, WV
Regular season
November 2, 2026*; 6:00 p.m., ESPN+		at UMass; MAC–SBC Challenge	W 74–70	1–0	17 – Olson	7 – Chesterfield	4 – Olson	Mullins Center (1,059); Amherst, MA
November 6, 2026*; 6:00 p.m., ESPN+		North Carolina A&T	W 62–45	2–0	17 – Gallagher	7 – Gallagher	4 – Olson	Cam Henderson Center (1,545); Huntington, WV
November 10, 2026*; 6:00 p.m., ESPN+		Howard	W 76–66	3–0	20 – Olson	8 – Marigney	5 – Ingram	Cam Henderson Center (1,252); Huntington, WV
November 12, 2026*; 11:00 a.m., ESPN+		West Virginia State	W 73–60	4–0	17 – Moody	8 – Tied	5 – Tied	Cam Henderson Center (1,021); Huntington, WV
November 15, 2026*; 3:00 p.m., ACCN		at No. 5 Duke	L 51–88	4–1	13 – Moody	5 – Moody	3 – Tied	Cameron Indoor Stadium (3,617); Durham, NC
November 18, 2026*; 5:00 p.m., ESPN+		at Wright State	W 76–47	5–1	13 – Olson	6 – Moody	2 – Tied	Nutter Center (1,108); Fairborn, OH
November 20, 2026*; 6:00 p.m., SECN+		at No. 12 Kentucky	L 49–85	5–2	15 – Gallagher	7 – Tied	2 – Tied	Memorial Coliseum (4,324); Lexington, KY
November 24, 2026*; 6:00 p.m.		Davis & Elkins						Cam Henderson Center; Huntington, WV
November 30, 2026*; TBA		Ohio						Cam Henderson Center; Huntington, WV
December 3, 2026*; TBA		at Tennessee Tech						Eblen Center; Cookeville, TN
December 6, 2026*; TBA		Harvard						Cam Henderson Center; Huntington, WV
December 12, 2026*; TBA		at Kent State						MAC Center; Kent, OH
December 16, 2026; TBA		Appalachian State						Cam Henderson Center; Huntington, WV
December 19, 2026; TBA		at South Alabama						Mitchell Center; Mobile, AL
December 22, 2026*; TBA		at Northern Kentucky						Truist Arena; Highland Heights, KY
December 30, 2026; TBA		at Troy						Trojan Arena; Troy, AL
January 2, 2027; TBA		at Arkansas State						First National Bank Arena; Jonesboro, AR
January 7, 2027; TBA		Louisiana Tech						Cam Henderson Center; Huntington, WV
January 9, 2027; TBA		Louisiana						Cam Henderson Center; Huntington, WV
January 14, 2027; TBA		Georgia State						Cam Henderson Center; Huntington, WV
January 16, 2027; TBA		James Madison						Cam Henderson Center; Huntington, WV
January 20, 2027; TBA		at Georgia State						Hill Convocation Center; Statesboro, GA
January 23, 2027; TBA		at Old Dominion						Chartway Arena; Norfolk, VA
January 28, 2027; TBA		at James Madison						Atlantic Union Bank Center; Harrisonburg, VA
January 30, 2027; TBA		at Appalachian State						Holmes Convocation Center; Boone, NC
February 3, 2027; TBA		Georgia Southern						Cam Henderson Center; Huntington, WV
February 6, 2027*; TBA		TBD; MAC–SBC Challenge						Cam Henderson Center; Huntington, WV
February 13, 2027; TBA		Louisiana–Monroe						Cam Henderson Center; Huntington, WV
February 18, 2027; TBA		at Coastal Carolina						HTC Center; Conway, SC
February 20, 2027; TBA		at Georgia State						GSU Convocation Center; Atlanta, GA
February 23, 2027; TBA		Old Dominion						Cam Henderson Center; Huntington, WV
February 26, 2027; TBA		Coastal Carolina						Cam Henderson Center; Huntington, WV
Sun Belt tournament
March 2–8, 2027; TBA		vs.						Pensacola Bay Center; Pensacola, FL
*Non-conference game. ^{#}Rankings from AP Poll. (#) Tournament seedings in parentheses. All times are in Eastern.
