= Butch Estes =

American basketball coach

Biographical details
- Born: June 14, 1949 (age 77)

Coaching career (HC unless noted)
- 1968–1971: North Carolina (student assistant)
- 1971–1973: The Citadel (assistant)
- 1973–1977: East Carolina (assistant)
- 1977–1980: Rice (assistant)
- 1980–1985: Presbyterian
- 1985–1994: Furman
- 1999–2003: Guilford
- 2003–2006: Miami-Dade
- 2006–2007: Miami (FL) (assistant)
- 2007–2008: Seattle (assistant)
- 2010–2013: Palm Beach State
- 2013–2025: Barry

Head coaching record
- Overall: 487–359 (.576) (college); 146–37 (.798) (junior college)
- Tournaments: 0–1 (NIT); 8–6 (NCAA Division II)

Accomplishments and honors

Championships
- SoCon regular season (1991); 3 SSC regular season (2016–2018)

Awards
- SoCon Coach of the Year (1987, 1991)

George "Butch" Estes (born June 14, 1949) is a men's basketball coach. He previously served as the head coach at Presbyterian College and Furman University. Estes resigned from Furman in March 1994, after finishing the 1993–94 regular season with a 9–17 record.

Coach Estes was the Head at Palm Beach State College from 2010 to 2013. He was offered the head coaching job at Barry University in 2013 and accepted it.

== Head coaching record ==
=== College ===
Record table
Season	Team	Overall	Conference	Standing	Postseason
Presbyterian Blue Hose (NAIA independent) (1980–1985)
1980–81	Presbyterian	10–21			
1981–82	Presbyterian	12–16			
1982–83	Presbyterian	21–12			
1983–84	Presbyterian	25–6			
1984–85	Presbyterian	24–8			
Presbyterian:		92–63 (.594)			
Furman Paladins (Southern Conference) (1985–1994)
1985–86	Furman	10–17	5–11	7th	
1986–87	Furman	17–12	10–6	4th	
1987–88	Furman	18–10	11–5	2nd	
1988–89	Furman	17–12	9–5	2nd	
1989–90	Furman	15–16	5–9	6th	
1990–91	Furman	20–9	11–3	1st	NIT First Round
1991–92	Furman	17–11	9–5	3rd	
1992–93	Furman	11–17	8–10	6th	
1993–94	Furman	10–18	6–12	8th	
Furman:		135–122 (.525)	74–66 (.529)		
Guilford Quakers (Old Dominion Athletic Conference) (1999–2003)
1999–2000	Guilford	6–18	4–14		
2000–01	Guilford	11–14	9–9		
2001–02	Guilford	15–11	9–8		
2002–03	Guilford	12–14	8–10		
Guilford:		44–57 (.436)	30–41 (.423)		
Barry Buccaneers (Sunshine State Conference) (2013–2025)
2013–14	Barry	20–8	11–7		NCAA Division II First Round
2014–15	Barry	25–6	13–3		NCAA Division II Second Round
2015–16	Barry	26–7	12–4		NCAA Division II Elite Eight
2016–17	Barry	23–7	13–5		NCAA Division II Second Round
2017–18	Barry	23–9	14–6		NCAA Division II Elite Eight
2018–19	Barry	18–11	12–8		
2019–20	Barry	18–10	12–8		
2020–21	Barry	2–5	0–0		
2021–22	Barry	20–9	13–7		NCAA Division II First Round
2022–23	Barry	12–14	8–12		
2023–24	Barry	17–14	8–12		
2024–25	Barry	12–17	8–12		
Barry:		216–117 (.649)	124–84 (.596)		
Total:		487–359 (.576)			
National champion Postseason invitational champion Conference regular season champion Conference regular season and conference tournament champion Division regular season champion Division regular season and conference tournament champion Conference tournament champion

=== Junior college ===
Record table
Season	Team	Overall	Conference	Standing	Postseason
Miami Dade College () (2003–2006)
2003–04	Miami Dade	17–13			
2004–05	Miami Dade	24–4			
2005–06	Miami Dade	25–7			
Miami Dade:		66–24 (.733)			
Palm Beach State College () (2010–2013)
2010–11	Palm Beach State	25–6	?		
2011–12	Palm Beach State	26–4	?		
2012–13	Palm Beach State	29–3	11–2		
Palm Beach State:		80–13 (.860)	11–2 (.846)		
Total:		146–37 (.798)			
National champion Postseason invitational champion Conference regular season champion Conference regular season and conference tournament champion Division regular season champion Division regular season and conference tournament champion Conference tournament champion
