= Georgia State Panthers women's basketball =

| 2026–27 Georgia State Panthers women's basketball team |
- University: Georgia State University
- Head coach: Marcilina Grayer (1st season)
- Location: Atlanta, Georgia
- Arena: Georgia State Convocation Center (capacity: 7,500)
- Conference: Sun Belt
- Nickname: Panthers
- Colors: Blue and white

NCAA Division I tournament appearances
- 2001, 2002, 2003

AIAW tournament appearances
- 1981

Conference tournament champions
- ASUN: 2001, 2002, 2003

Conference regular-season champions
- ASUN: 2000, 2001, 2002, 2004

Uniforms
| Home | Away |

The Georgia State Panthers women's basketball team represents Georgia State University and competes in the Sun Belt Conference of NCAA Division I. The Panthers play at the GSU Convocation Center in Atlanta, Georgia, United States.

== Coaches ==
| | Coach | Seasons | Wins | Losses | Win % |
|---|---|---|---|---|---|
| 9 | Gene Hill | 2018-2026 | 102 | 135 | .431 |
| 8 | Sharon Baldwin-Tener | 2010–2018 | 88 | 152 | .366 |
| 7 | Lea Henry | 1994–2010 | 245 | 222 | .525 |
| 6 | Brenda Paul | 1989–1994 | 50 | 88 | .362 |
| 5 | Dave Lucey | 1986–1989 | 36 | 48 | .429 |
| 4 | Richard Keast | 1984–1986 | 39 | 33 | .541 |
| 3 | Joyce Patterson | 1981–1984 | 19 | 44 | .302 |
| 2 | Jim Jarett | 1980–1981 | 39 | 12 | .765 |
| 1 | Rankin Cooter | 1975–1979 | 66 | 31 | .680 |

== Team records ==
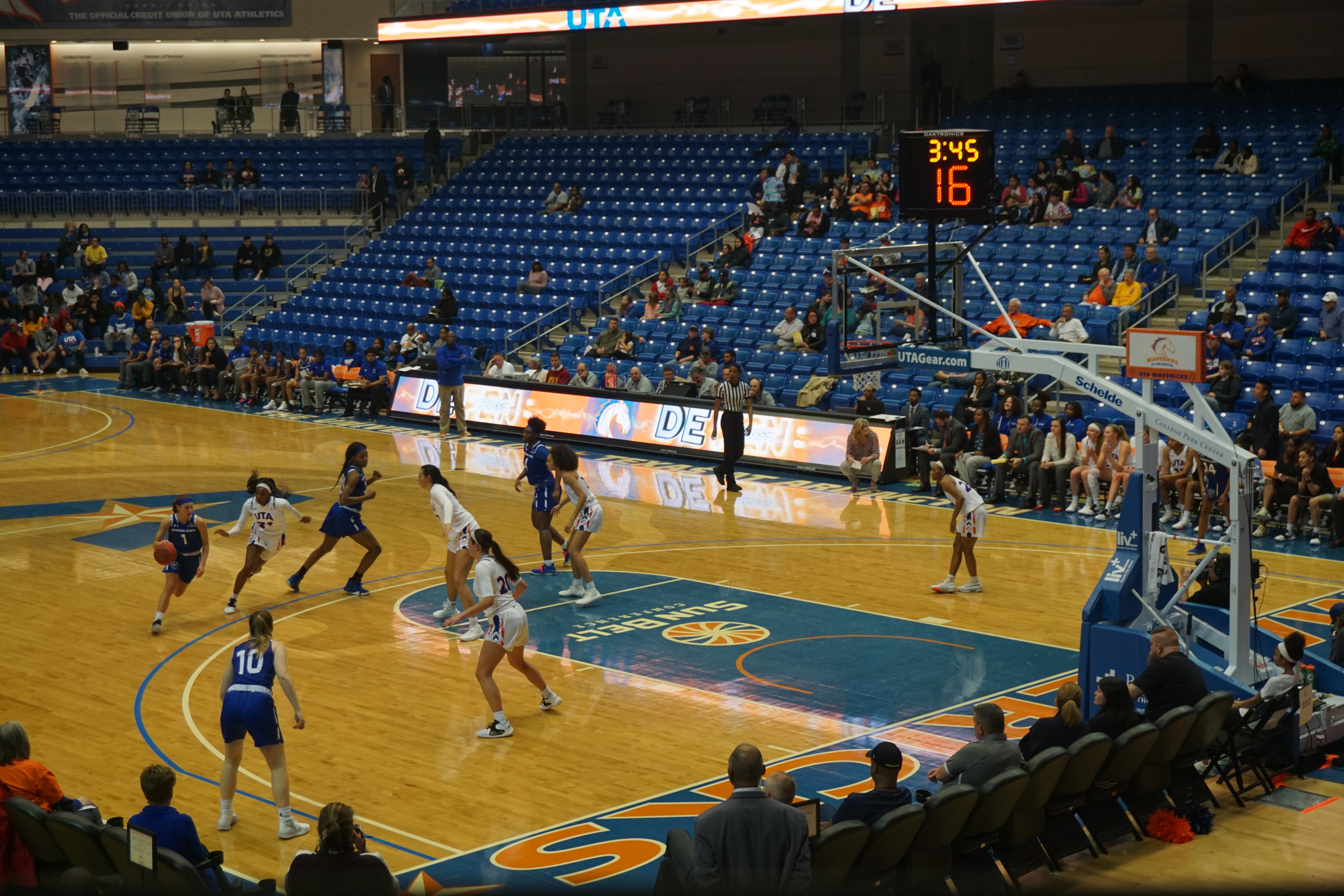
Georgia State in action at UT Arlington in 2020

- Most wins – 28 during the 1980–1981 season
- Longest Winning Streak – 10 games during the 2002–03 regular season.

== Post season tournament results ==
=== NCAA tournament results ===
Georgia State has been to the NCAA tournament three times. Their combined record is 0–3.

| Year | Seed | Round | Opponent | Result |
|---|---|---|---|---|
| 2001 | #14 | First Round | Louisiana Tech | L 84–48 |
| 2002 | #15 | First Round | Tennessee | L 98–68 |
| 2003 | #16 | First Round | Duke | L 66–48 |

=== NIT results ===
Georgia State has been to the Women's NIT one time. Their record is 0–1.

| Year | Round | Opponent | Result |
|---|---|---|---|
| 2000 | Opening Round | Virginia Tech | L 80–56 |

=== AIAW results ===
Georgia State has appeared in one AIAW Tournament. Their record is 0–1.

| Year | Round | Opponent | Result |
|---|---|---|---|
| 1981 | First Round | North Carolina State | 95–86 |

== School records ==
=== Game ===
- Most points – 52 by Sheryl Martin (vs. Stetson) on February 18, 1983
- Most 3-pointers made – 8 by Lina Noufena (vs. Stetson) on February 14, 2002
- Most free throws made – 17 by Leslie McElrath (vs. Mercer) on February 13, 1999
- Most rebounds – ?????Tied, both by Angela Gresham vs. Mercer on January 28, 1987 and vs Massachusetts on December 19, 1988
- Most assists – 16 by Denise Lloyd (vs. VCU) on February 13, 1981
- Most blocks – 11 by Marcquitta Head (vs. Hofstra) on December 3, 2006
- Most steals – Tied 2 ways at 9, by Brittany Hollins (vs. VCU) on January 13, 2006, and by Jylisa Williams (vs. Delaware State) on December 21, 2008

=== Season ===
- Most points – 771 by Terese Allen during the 1980–81 season
- Most free throws made – 170 by Maxine Farmer during the 1983–84 season
- Highest free throw percentage – .874 by Marica Maddox during the 1999–00 season
- Highest rebound average – 15.1 by Angela Gresham during the 1984–85 season
- Most assists – 199 by Denise Lloyd during the 1980–81 season
- Most blocks – 67 by Marcquitta Head during the 2006–07 season
- Most steals – 98 by Brittany Hollins during the 2006–07 season
