= Warren County High School =

Warren County High School may refer to:

- Warren County High School (North Carolina)
- Warren County High School (Virginia)
- Warren County High School (Georgia)
- Warren County High School (Tennessee)
