= Texas State Bobcats women's basketball =

2026–27 Texas State Bobcats women's basketball team
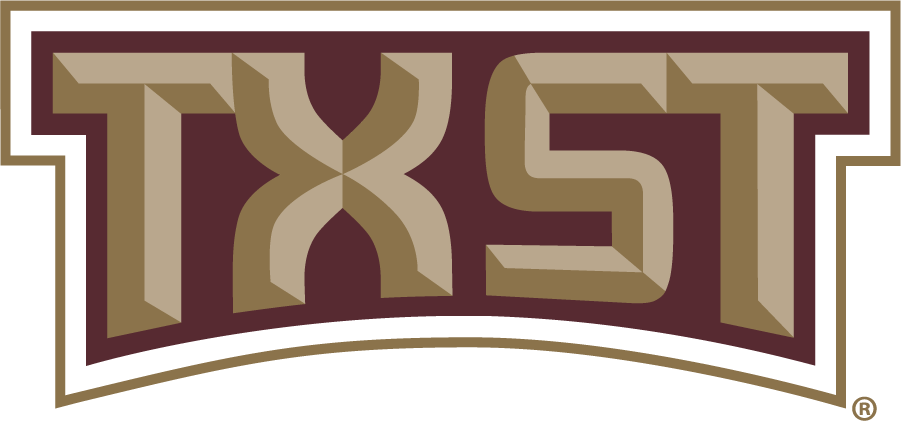
- University: Texas State University
- Head coach: Chris Kielsmeier (1st season)
- Location: San Marcos, Texas
- Arena: Strahan Arena (capacity: 7,200)
- Conference: Pac-12
- Nickname: Bobcats
- Colors: Maroon and gold

NCAA Division I tournament appearances
- 1997, 2003

Conference tournament champions
- Southland: 1997, 2003

Conference regular-season champions
- Sun Belt: 2023

The Texas State Bobcats women's basketball team is the basketball team that represents Texas State University. They play their home games at the Strahan Arena and are members of the Pac-12 Conference (Pac-12). Southwest Texas State became Texas State in 2003.

== History ==
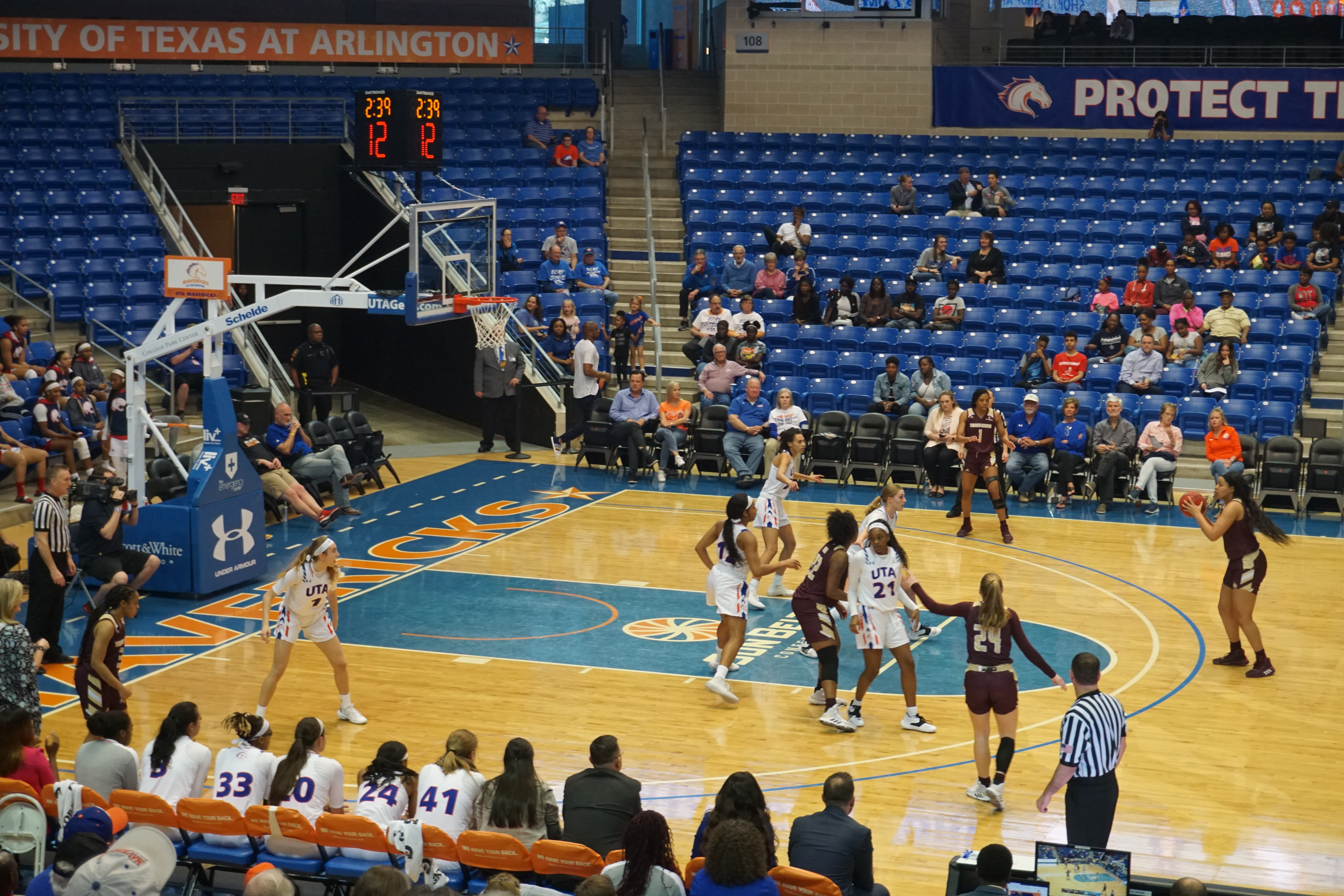
Texas State in action in the 2020 Sun Belt Conference women's basketball tournament

The Bobcats have an all-time record (as of the end of the 2015–16 season) of 715–682. They have made the NCAA Tournament twice (1997 and 2003), the WNIT once (2008) and the WBI twice (2014 and 2015).

== NCAA tournament results ==
Year	Seed	Round	Opponent	Result
1997	#14	First Round	#3 Texas	L 38–66
2003	#16	First Round	#1 LSU	L 50–86
