= Coastal Carolina Chanticleers women's basketball =

Coastal Carolina Chanticleers
2025–26 Coastal Carolina Chanticleers women's basketball team
- University: Coastal Carolina University
- Head coach: Kevin Pederson (4th season)
- Location: Conway, South Carolina
- Arena: HTC Center (capacity: 3,600)
- Conference: Sun Belt
- Nickname: Chanticleers
- Colors: Teal, bronze, and black

The Coastal Carolina Chanticleers women's basketball team is the women's basketball team that represents Coastal Carolina University in Conway, South Carolina, United States. The school's team currently competes in the Sun Belt Conference.

== History ==
As of the end of the 2015–16 season, the Chanticleers have an all-time record of 482–656. Coastal Carolina joined the Big South Conference in 1986, playing for 30 years before leaving for the Sun Belt Conference beginning with the 2016–17 season. In the 30 years they played in the Big South, they went 181–259. They have never qualified for the NCAA Tournament. They lost in the Big South Conference women's basketball tournament championship game in 1999, 2000, and 2002, with the winner being Liberty each time.

== Postseason results ==
=== WNIT ===
The Chanticleers have appeared in the Women's National Invitation Tournament (WNIT) one time. They have an overall tournament record of 0–1.

Year	Round	Opponent	Result
2025	First Round	Campbell	L 55–57
