= 2026–27 Missouri Tigers women's basketball team =

Intercollegiate basketball season

2026–27 Missouri Tigers women's basketball
- Conference: Southeastern Conference
- Record: 5–0 (0–0 SEC)
- Head coach: Kellie Harper (2nd season)
- Assistant coaches: Jennifer Sullivan; Kenzie Kostas; Liza Fruendt; Mike Nicholson; Devin Hill
- Home arena: Mizzou Arena

2026–27 SEC women's basketball standings
	Conf.				Overall
Team	W		L	PCT	W		L	PCT
No. 9 LSU	0	–	0	–	6	–	0	1.000
No. 14 Oklahoma	0	–	0	–	6	–	0	1.000
Tennessee	0	–	0	–	6	–	0	1.000
Arkansas	0	–	0	–	5	–	0	1.000
No. 12 Kentucky	0	–	0	–	5	–	0	1.000
Mississippi State	0	–	0	–	5	–	0	1.000
Missouri	0	–	0	–	5	–	0	1.000
No. 1 South Carolina	0	–	0	–	5	–	0	1.000
No. 6 Texas	0	–	0	–	5	–	0	1.000
Texas A&M	0	–	0	–	5	–	0	1.000
Alabama	0	–	0	–	6	–	1	.857
Georgia	0	–	0	–	5	–	1	.833
No. 11 Vanderbilt	0	–	0	–	5	–	1	.833
Auburn	0	–	0	–	4	–	1	.800
No. 19т Ole Miss	0	–	0	–	4	–	1	.800
Florida	0	–	0	–	4	–	2	.667
† 2027 SEC tournament winner As of November 20, 2026; Rankings from AP poll

The 2026–27 Missouri Tigers women's basketball team will represent the University of Missouri during the 2026–27 NCAA Division I women's basketball season. The Tigers, led by second-year head coach Kellie Harper, will play their home games at Mizzou Arena and compete as members of the Southeastern Conference (SEC).

== Previous season ==
The Tigers finished the 2025–26 season 17–17 overall and 4–12 in SEC play, to finish fourteenth in the conference. As the No. 14 seed in the SEC tournament, they lost in the first round 48–65 to No. 11 Alabama.

Following their tournament loss, the Tigers earned an at-large bid to the WBIT, their first appearance since its creation in 2024 and being given one of the eight tournament No. 4 seeds. They defeated Seton Hall in the first round, before falling in the second round to No. 1 BYU

== Offseason ==
=== Departures ===
Missouri departures
Name	Number	Pos.	Height	Year	Hometown	Reason for departure
Shannon Dowell	1	Guard	5'10"	Junior	O'Fallon, IL	Transferred to California
Saniah Tyler	2	Guard	5'6"	Senior	Florissant, MO	Graduated
Lisa Thompson	4	Guard	5'9"	Junior	Joliet, IL	Transferred to Utah State
Jordana Reisma	10	Forward	6'3"	Senior	Brown Deer, WI	Graduated
Jayla Smith	11	Guard	6'0"	(redshirt) Senior	Indianapolis, IN	Graduated
Ma'Riya Vincent	12	Guard	6'0"	(redshirt) Freshman	Houston, TX	Transferred to Wichita State
Chloe Sotell	22	Guard	6'0"	Sophomore	Stamford, CT	Transferred to Maryland
Sydney Mains	24	Guard	5'10"	Junior	Knoxville, TN	Medically retired (Note: Announced on October 24, 2026 prior to the start of the 2026–27 season.)
Hannah Linthacum	34	Forward	6'4"	Junior	Jefferson City, MO	Transferred to Missouri State (Note: Did not play in the 2025–26 season due to injury.)

=== Incoming transfers ===
Missouri incoming transfers
Name	Number	Pos.	Height	Year	Hometown	Previous school
Neveah Caffey	1	Guard	5'10"	Sophomore	Warrenton, MO	Indiana
Tanyuel Welch	7	Guard	5'10"	(redshirt) Senior	Indianapolis, IN	Arizona
McKenzie Mathurin	25	Guard	5'10"	Sophomore	Broken Arrow, OK	Michigan

=== Recruiting class ===
College recruiting
Name	Hometown	School	Height	Weight	Commit date
Natalya Hodge; G	Knoxville, TN	Bearden High School	5 ft 7 in (1.70 m)	N/A	
Natalya Hodge; G	Recruit ratings: Rivals: 247Sports: ESPN: (93)				
Khloe Ford; F	Hoover, AL	Hoover High School	6 ft 3 in (1.91 m)	N/A	
Khloe Ford; F	Recruit ratings: 247Sports: ESPN: (91)				
Jada Maples; G	Earle, AR	Earle High School	5 ft 10 in (1.78 m)	N/A	
Jada Maples; G	Recruit ratings: Rivals:				
Overall recruit ranking:
Note: In many cases, Scout, Rivals, 247Sports, On3, and ESPN may conflict in their listings of height and weight.; In these cases, the average was taken. ESPN grades are on a 100-point scale.; Sources: "2026 Player Commits". ESPN. Archived from the original on August 1, 2026.

== Preseason ==
On October 12, 2026, the SEC released its annual preseason media poll and awards. Missouri was picked to finish fourteenth in the conference.

=== Preseason rankings ===
SEC Preseason Poll
Place	Team
1	South Carolina
2	Texas
3	LSU
4	Vanderbilt
5	Kentucky
6	Oklahoma
7	Ole Miss
8	Tennessee
9	Mississippi State
10	Alabama
11	Texas A&M
12	Florida
13	Georgia
14	Missouri
15	Auburn
16	Arkansas

=== Preseason All-SEC Teams ===
No players were named to the All-SEC First or Second Team.

== Roster ==
Years are listed according to the new NCAA age-based eligibility model.

2026–27 Missouri Tigers women's basketball team
Players
Coaches

Pos.	#	Name	Height	Year	Previous school	Hometown
G	0	Grace Slaughter	6 ft 2 in (1.88 m)	Sr	Grain Valley High School	Grain Valley, MO
G	1	Neveah Caffey	5 ft 10 in (1.78 m)	So	Incarnate Word Academy; Indiana	Warrenton, MO
G	2	Natalya Hodge	5 ft 7 in (1.7 m)	Fr	Bearden High School	Knoxville, TN
F	5	Khloe Ford	6 ft 4 in (1.93 m)	Fr	Hoover High School	Hoover, AL
G	7	Tanyuel Welch (5th)	5 ft 10 in (1.78 m)	Sr	North Central High School; Arizona	Indianapolis, IN
F	11	Cecilie Brandimore	6 ft 4 in (1.93 m)	Fr	Franklin High School	Franklin, TN
G	12	Jada Maples	5 ft 10 in (1.78 m)	Fr	Earle High School	Earle, AR
F	15	Ellie Muller	6 ft 3 in (1.91 m)	Fr	Dowling Catholic High School	West Des Moines, IA
G	21	Averi Kroenke (5th)	5 ft 11 in (1.8 m)	Sr	Rock Bridge High School	Columbia, MO
G	23	Abbey Schreacke	6 ft 0 in (1.83 m)	Sr	Quincy Notre Dame High School	Quincy, IL
G	25	McKenzie Mathurin	5 ft 10 in (1.78 m)	So	Broken Arrow High School; Michigan	Broken Arrow, OK
F	55	Reka Toman	6 ft 0 in (1.83 m)	So	Eötvös József Gimnázium; Soproni Darazsak Sportakadémia	Budapest, Hungary

Head coach

- Kellie Harper (Tennessee)

Assistant coach(es)

- Jennifer Sullivan (Memphis)
- Kenzie Kostas (Missouri State)
- Liza Fruendt (Missouri State)
- Mike Nicholson (Missouri)
- Devin Hill (DePaul)

Legend

- (C) Team captain
- (S) Suspended
- (I) Ineligible
- (W) Walk-on
- (5th) Fifth year senior
- Injured
- Current redshirt

Roster
Last update: August 1, 2026

== Schedule and results ==
Date time, TV	Rank^{#}	Opponent^{#}	Result	Record	High points	High rebounds	High assists	Site (attendance) city, state
Exhibition
October 29, 2026*; 6:30 p.m.		Lincoln (MO)	W 117–43		25 – Slaughter	10 – Muller	6 – Hodge	Mizzou Arena; Columbia, MO
Non-conference regular season
November 2, 2026*; 6:30 p.m., SECN+/ESPN+		Howard	W 91–88 ^{OT}	1–0	29 – Mathurin	15 – Ford	3 – Slaughter	Mizzou Arena (2,910); Columbia, MO
November 6, 2026*; 7:00 p.m., ESPN+		at Little Rock	W 73–50	2–0	23 – Slaughter	9 – Caffey	2 – Slaughter	Jack Stephens Center (737); Little Rock, AR
November 9, 2026*; 11:00 a.m., SECN+/ESPN+		Tennessee Tech	W 106–59	3–0	25 – Slaughter	12 – Welch	6 – Welch	Mizzou Arena (5,194); Columbia, MO
November 12, 2026*; 6:30 p.m., SECN+/ESPN+		UT Martin	W 103–59	4–0	17 – Mathurin	11 – Mathurin	6 – Hodge	Mizzou Arena (2,688); Columbia, MO
November 15, 2026*; 2:00 p.m., SECN+/ESPN+		Lindenwood	W 79–63	5–0	11 – Dykstra	7 – Rucker	11 – Dykstra	Mizzou Arena (2,940); Columbia, MO
November 22, 2026; 6:30 p.m., SECN+		vs. Kansas State; 28.5 Hoops Women's Invitational						T-Mobile Center; Kansas City, MO
November 24, 2026*; 5:30 p.m., SECN+/ESPN+		SIU Edwardsville						Mizzou Arena; Columbia, MO
November 27, 2026*; 10:00 a.m., BallerTV		vs. Tulane; Daytona Beach Classic						Ocean Center; Daytona Beach, FL
November 28, 2026*; 12:15 p.m., BallerTV		vs. Boise State; Daytona Beach Classic						Ocean Center; Daytona Beach, FL
December 3, 2026; 6:00 p.m., ACCN		at Florida State; ACC–SEC Challenge						Donald L. Tucker Civic Center; Tallahassee, FL
December 6, 2026*; 2:00 p.m., SECN+/ESPN+		Eastern Illinois						Mizzou Arena; Columbia, MO
December 13, 2026*; 7:00 p.m., BTN		at Illinois; Braggin' Rights						State Farm Center; Champaign, IL
December 13, 2026*; 1:00 p.m., SECN+/ESPN+		Saint Louis						Mizzou Arena; Columbia, MO
December 18, 2026*; 6:30 p.m., SECN+/ESPN+		Jacksonville State						Mizzou Arena; Columbia, MO
December 20, 2026*; 5:00 p.m., SECN+/ESPN+		Austin Peay						Mizzou Arena; Columbia, MO
December 28, 2026*; 6:30 p.m.		Columbia College; Exhibition						Mizzou Arena; Columbia, MO
SEC regular season
December 31, 2026; 3:00 p.m., SECN+/ESPN+		Mississippi State						Mizzou Arena; Columbia, MO
January 3, 2027; 3:00 p.m., SECN		at Oklahoma						Lloyd Noble Center; Norman, OK
January 7, 2027; 6:30 p.m., SECN+/ESPN+		Kentucky						Mizzou Arena; Columbia, MO
January 10, 2027; 2:00 p.m., SECN+/ESPN+		at Texas A&M						Reed Arena; College Station, TX
January 14, 2027; 6:00 p.m., SECN+/ESPN+		at Ole MIss						SJB Pavilion; Oxford, MS
January 17, 2027; 3:00 p.m., SECN		South Carolina						Mizzou Arena; Columbia, MO
January 21, 2027; 6:30 p.m., SECN+/ESPN+		Vanderbilt						Mizzou Arena; Columbia, MO
January 28, 2027; 7:00 p.m., SECN+/ESPN+		at Texas						Moody Center; Austin, TX
February 1, 2027; 6:00 p.m., SECN		at Alabama						Coleman Coliseum; Tuscaloosa, AL
February 4, 2027; 6:30 p.m., SECN+/ESPN+		Florida						Mizzou Arena; Columbia, MO
February 7, 2027; 1:00 p.m., SECN		LSU						Mizzou Arena; Columbia, MO
February 11, 2027; 5:30 p.m., SECN+/ESPN+		at Georgia						Stegeman Coliseum; Athens, GA
February 14, 2027; 1:00 p.m., SECN		Tennessee						Mizzou Arena; Columbia, MO
February 21, 2027; 4:00 p.m., SECN		Arkansas						Mizzou Arena; Columbia, MO
February 25, 2027; 6:30 p.m., SECN+/ESPN+		at Vanderbilt						Memorial Gymnasium; Nashville, TN
February 28, 2027; 3:00 p.m., SECN		at Auburn						Neville Arena; Auburn, AL
SEC tournament
March 3–7, 2027; TBA		vs.						Bon Secours Wellness Arena; Greenville, SC
*Non-conference game. ^{#}Rankings from AP Poll. (#) Tournament seedings in parentheses. All times are in Central.
