= 2026–27 Florida Gators women's basketball team =

American collegiate basketball season

2026–27 Florida Gators women's basketball
- Conference: Southeastern Conference
- Record: 4–2 (0–0 SEC)
- Head coach: Tammi Reiss (1st season)
- Associate head coach: Shay Robinson; Tahnee Balerio; CJ Jones
- Assistant coaches: Jen Fay; Cynthia Jordan
- Home arena: O'Connell Center

2026–27 SEC women's basketball standings
	Conf.				Overall
Team	W		L	PCT	W		L	PCT
No. 9 LSU	0	–	0	–	6	–	0	1.000
No. 14 Oklahoma	0	–	0	–	6	–	0	1.000
Tennessee	0	–	0	–	6	–	0	1.000
Arkansas	0	–	0	–	5	–	0	1.000
No. 12 Kentucky	0	–	0	–	5	–	0	1.000
Mississippi State	0	–	0	–	5	–	0	1.000
Missouri	0	–	0	–	5	–	0	1.000
No. 1 South Carolina	0	–	0	–	5	–	0	1.000
No. 6 Texas	0	–	0	–	5	–	0	1.000
Texas A&M	0	–	0	–	5	–	0	1.000
Alabama	0	–	0	–	6	–	1	.857
Georgia	0	–	0	–	5	–	1	.833
No. 11 Vanderbilt	0	–	0	–	5	–	1	.833
Auburn	0	–	0	–	4	–	1	.800
No. 19т Ole Miss	0	–	0	–	4	–	1	.800
Florida	0	–	0	–	4	–	2	.667
† 2027 SEC tournament winner As of November 20, 2026; Rankings from AP poll

The 2026–27 Florida Gators women's basketball team currently represents the University of Florida during the 2026–27 NCAA Division I women's basketball season. The Gators, led by first-year head coach Tammi Reiss, play their home games at the O'Connell Center in Gainesville, Florida, and compete as a member of the Southeastern Conference (SEC).

== Previous season ==
The Gators finished the 2025–26 season 18–15 overall and 5–11 in SEC play, to finish in a tie for eleventh place. As the No. 12 seed in the SEC tournament, they defeated No. 13 Mississippi State in the first round before losing in the second round to No. 5 Oklahoma to end their season.

On March 9, 2026, it was announced that the program had parted ways with head coach Kelly Rae Finley after five seasons, in which she went 93–75. On March 23, Rhode Island head coach Tammi Reiss was announced as the team's new head coach. In the 2025–26 season, Reiss led the Rams to a 28–5 record, alongside a regular season title, their first A-10 championship in program history and their first NCAA tournament appearance since 1996.

== Offseason ==
=== Departures ===
Florida departures
Name	Number	Pos.	Height	Year	Hometown	Reason for departure
Sarah Deng	0	Guard	5'10"	Junior	Adelaide, Australia	Transferred to Loyola Marymount
Nyadieng Yiech	2	Forward	6'3"	Freshman	Calgary, AB	Transferred to Grand Canyon
Knisha Godfrey	4	Guard	5'9"	(redshirt) Senior	Columbus, OH	Transferred to Ole Miss
Emilija Dakic	7	Guard/Forward	6'4"	Freshman	Melbourne, Australia	Transferred to Iowa State
Me'Arah O'Neal	8	Guard/Forward	6'4"	Sophomore	Houston, TX	Transferred to Kentucky
Alexia Dizeko	9	Forward	5'11"	Graduate student	Sion, Switzerland	Graduated
Daviane Mindoudi Ongbakahoumb	12	Guard	6'1"	Sophomore	Bilbao, Spain	Transferred to Providence
Laila Reynolds	13	Guard	6'1"	Junior	Prince George's County, MD	Transferred to LSU
Caterina Piatti	14	Center	6'4"	Freshman	Scandiano, Italy	Transferred to Virginia
Liv McGill	23	Guard	5'9"	Sophomore	Minneapolis, MN	Transferred to Oklahoma State

=== Incoming transfers ===
Florida incoming transfers
Name	Number	Pos.	Height	Year	Hometown	Previous school
Aurora Almón	0	Forward	6'4"	Junior	Santo Domingo, DR	Syracuse
Ja'Niya Broome	2	Guard	5'9"	Sophomore	Hamilton, GA	South Georgia Technical (NJCAA)
Moriah Murray	3	Guard	5'8"	(redshirt) Senior	Dunmore, PA	Penn State
Jordan Jones	4	Guard	6'0"	Senior	Cheyenne, WY	Arizona State
Skye Owen	5	Guard	5'7"	(redshirt) Senior	Staten Island, NY	St. John's
Taliyah Parker	21	Guard	6'1"	Junior	Oklahoma City, OK	TCU
Vivian Iwuchukwu	22	Forward	6'3"	Junior	Imo State, Nigeria	USC
Vanessa Harris	23	Guard	5'10"	Sophomore	Glenarden, MD	Rhode Island
Mallory Miller	24	Forward	6'4"	(redshirt) Junior	Aberdeen, SD	Butler
Kiyomi McMiller	32	Guard	5'8"	Junior	Silver Spring, MD	Penn State

=== Recruiting class ===
There was no 2026 recruiting class.

== Preseason ==
On October 12, 2026, the SEC released its annual preseason media poll and awards. Florida was picked to finish twelfth in the conference.

=== Preseason rankings ===
SEC Preseason Poll
Place	Team
1	South Carolina
2	Texas
3	LSU
4	Vanderbilt
5	Kentucky
6	Oklahoma
7	Ole Miss
8	Tennessee
9	Mississippi State
10	Alabama
11	Texas A&M
12	Florida
13	Georgia
14	Missouri
15	Auburn
16	Arkansas

=== Preseason All-SEC Teams ===
No players were named to the All-SEC First or Second Team.

== Roster ==
2026–27 Florida Gators women's basketball team
Players
Coaches

Pos.	#	Name	Height	Year	Previous school	Hometown
F	0	Aurora Almón	6 ft 4 in (1.93 m)	Jr	The Webb Schools; Syracuse	San Domingo, DR
F	1	Jade Weathersby	6 ft 3 in (1.91 m)	Sr	Brookwood High School; UAB	Aurora, CO
G	2	Ja'Niya Broome	5 ft 10 in (1.78 m)	So	Harris County High School; South Georgia Technical College	Hamilton, GA
G	3	Moriah Murray	5 ft 8 in (1.73 m)	RS Sr	Dunmore High School; Penn State	Dunmore, PA
G	4	Jordan Jones	5 ft 11 in (1.8 m)	Sr	Cheyenne East High School; Arizona State	Cheyenne, WY
G	5	Skye Owen	5 ft 8 in (1.73 m)	RS Sr	St. Francis Preparatory School; St. John's	Staten Island, NY
G	11	Bailey Harris	6 ft 0 in (1.83 m)	Fr	St. Mary's High School	Annapolis, MD
G	21	Taliyah Parker	6 ft 1 in (1.85 m)	Jr	South Grand Prairie High School; TCU	Oklahoma City, OK
F	22	Vivian Iwuchukwu	6 ft 3 in (1.91 m)	Jr	Montverde Academy; USC	Imo State, Nigeria
G	23	Vanessa Harris	5 ft 10 in (1.78 m)	So	Bishop McNamara High School; Rhode Island	Glenarden, MD
F	24	Mallory Miller	6 ft 4 in (1.93 m)	RS Jr	Wolsey-Wessington HS; Butler	Aberdeen, SD
G	32	Kiyomi McMiller	5 ft 8 in (1.73 m)	Jr	Life Center Academy; Penn State	Silver Spring, MD
C	34	Maja Bigovic	6 ft 5 in (1.96 m)	Fr		Montenegro

Head coach

- Tammi Reiss (Virginia)

Assistant coach(es)

- Shay Robinson (Central Florida)
- Tahnee Balerio (Missouri State)
- CJ Jones (Francis Marion)
- Jen Fay (Quinnipiac)
- Cynthia Jordan (Temple)

Legend

- (C) Team captain
- (S) Suspended
- (I) Ineligible
- (W) Walk-on
- Injured
- Current redshirt

Roster

== Schedule and results ==
Date time, TV	Rank^{#}	Opponent^{#}	Result	Record	High points	High rebounds	High assists	Site (attendance) city, state
Exhibition
October 28, 2026*; 6:00 p.m.		Flagler	W 107–54		27 – McMiller	15 – V. Harris	6 – McMiller	O'Connell Center (354); Gainesville, FL
Non-conference regular season
November 2, 2026*; 6:00 p.m., SECN+		Bucknell	W 83–60	1–0	31 – McMiller	10 – Almón	5 – McMiller	O'Connell Center (1,116); Gainesville, FL
November 5, 2026*; 4:30 p.m., SECN+		UCF	W 95–65	2–0	42 – McMiller	12 – V. Harris	4 – V. Harris	O'Connell Center (1,486); Gainesville, FL
November 8, 2026*; 2:00 p.m., ESPN+		at Chattanooga	W 64–58	3–0	19 – Iwuchukwu	12 – Weathersby	6 – McMiller	McKenzie Arena (3,335); Chattanooga, TN
November 12, 2026*; 6:00 p.m., SECN+		South Florida	L 70–72	3–1	15 – Weathersby	10 – Iwuchukwu	4 – Tied	O'Connell Center (1,215); Gainesville, FL
November 15, 2026*; 2:00 p.m., ACCNX/ESPN+		at Florida State	L 63–71	3–2	15 – McMiller	7 – Weathersby	4 – McMiller	Donald L. Tucker Civic Center (1,777); Tallahassee, FL
November 19, 2026*; 6:00 p.m., SECN+		Florida Atlantic	W 82–39	4–2	26 – McMiller	9 – Weathersby	3 – Tied	O'Connell Center (933); Gainesville, FL
November 24, 2026*; 3:30 p.m., ESPN+		vs. West Virginia; Battle 4 Atlantis						Imperial Arena; Nassau, Bahamas
November 26, 2026*; 2:00 p.m., ESPNU		vs. Davidson; Battle 4 Atlantis						Imperial Arena; Nassau, Bahamas
December 2, 2026*; 5:00 p.m., ESPNU		Miami (FL); ACC–SEC Challenge						O'Connell Center; Gainesville, FL
December 6, 2026*; TBA, SECN+		North Florida						O'Connell Center; Gainesville, FL
December 14, 2026*; 6:00 p.m., SECN+		Bethune–Cookman						O'Connell Center; Gainesville, FL
December 17, 2026*; 6:00 p.m., SECN+		Norfolk State						O'Connell Center; Gainesville, FL
December 20, 2026*; 12:00 p.m., SECN		Charleston Southern						O'Connell Center; Gainesville, FL
December 22, 2026*; 1:00 p.m., SECN+		Florida A&M						O'Connell Center; Gainesville, FL
SEC regular season
December 31, 2026; 3:00 p.m., SECN+		Kentucky						O'Connell Center; Gainesville, FL
January 3, 2027; 2:00 p.m., SECN		at Arkansas						Bud Walton Arena; Fayetteville, AR
January 7, 2027; 7:00 p.m., SECN+		at Alabama						Coleman Coliseum; Tuscaloosa, AL
January 10, 2027; 2:00 p.m., SECN		LSU						O'Connell Center; Gainesville, FL
January 14, 2027; 6:00 p.m., SECN+		Auburn						O'Connell Center; Gainesville, FL
January 18, 2027; 7:00 p.m., SECN		Tennessee						O'Connell Center; Gainesville, FL
January 21, 2027; 7:00 p.m., SECN+		at South Carolina						Colonial Life Arena; Columbia, SC
January 24, 2027; 3:00 p.m., SECN		at Ole Miss						SJB Pavilion; Oxford, MS
January 28, 2027; 6:00 p.m., SECN+		Georgia						O'Connell Center; Gainesville, FL
February 4, 2027; 7:30 p.m., SECN+		at Missouri						Mizzou Arena; Columbia, MO
February 7, 2027; 3:00 p.m., SECN+		at Texas A&M						Reed Arena; College Station, TX
February 11, 2027; 6:00 p.m., SECN+		Mississippi State						O'Connell Center; Gainesville, FL
February 14, 2027; 12:00 p.m., SECN		Oklahoma						O'Connell Center; Gainesville, FL
February 21, 2027; 3:00 p.m., SECN		at Texas						Moody Center; Austin, TX
February 25, 2027; 7:00 p.m., SECN		at Georgia						Stegeman Coliseum; Athens, GA
February 28, 2027; 1:00 p.m., SECN+		Vanderbilt						O'Connell Center; Gainesville, FL
SEC tournament
March 3–7, 2027; TBA		vs.						Bon Secours Wellness Arena; Greenville, SC
*Non-conference game. ^{#}Rankings from AP Pollf. (#) Tournament seedings in parentheses. All times are in Eastern.

== See also ==
- 2026–27 Florida Gators men's basketball team
