= 2026–27 Georgia Lady Bulldogs basketball team =

Intercollegiate basketball season

2026–27 Georgia Lady Bulldogs basketball
- Conference: Southeastern Conference
- Record: 6–1 (0–0 SEC)
- Head coach: Ayla Guzzardo (1st season)
- Associate head coach: Kenneth Lee Jr. Justin Payne
- Assistant coaches: Amber Gregg; Ronneka Robertson; Brianna Patton; Aliyah Gregory
- Home arena: Stegeman Coliseum

2026–27 SEC women's basketball standings
	Conf.				Overall
Team	W		L	PCT	W		L	PCT
No. 12 Kentucky	0	–	0	–	6	–	0	1.000
No. 9 LSU	0	–	0	–	6	–	0	1.000
No. 14 Oklahoma	0	–	0	–	6	–	0	1.000
No. 1 South Carolina	0	–	0	–	6	–	0	1.000
Tennessee	0	–	0	–	6	–	0	1.000
No. 6 Texas	0	–	0	–	6	–	0	1.000
Arkansas	0	–	0	–	5	–	0	1.000
Mississippi State	0	–	0	–	5	–	0	1.000
Missouri	0	–	0	–	5	–	0	1.000
Texas A&M	0	–	0	–	5	–	0	1.000
Alabama	0	–	0	–	6	–	2	.750
Auburn	0	–	0	–	5	–	1	.833
Georgia	0	–	0	–	5	–	1	.833
No. 11 Vanderbilt	0	–	0	–	5	–	1	.833
No. 19т Ole Miss	0	–	0	–	4	–	1	.800
Florida	0	–	0	–	4	–	2	.667
† 2027 SEC tournament winner As of November 22, 2026; Rankings from AP poll

The 2026–27 Georgia Lady Bulldogs basketball team represents the University of Georgia during the 2026–27 NCAA Division I women's basketball season. The Lady Bulldogs are led by first-year head coach Ayla Guzzardo and play their home games at the Stegeman Coliseum in Athens, Georgia as a member of the Southeastern Conference (SEC).

== Previous season ==
The Lady Bulldogs finished the 2025–26 season 22–10 overall and 8–8 in SEC play, to finish in a four-way tie for sixth in the conference alongside Tennessee, Ole Miss and Kentucky. As the No. 8 seed in the SEC tournament, where they lost to No. 9 Kentucky in the second round.

Following the loss, the Lady Bulldogs earned an at-large bid to the NCAA tournament, where they were seeded No. 7 in the Sacramento #4 Regional. They lost in overtime to No. 10 Virginia in the first round.

On April 4, 2026, it was announced by the school that head coach Katie Abrahamson-Henderson had agreed to mutually part ways after four seasons, posting a 69–59 record but only one finish above .500 in the SEC. A day later, McNeese head coach Ayla Guzzardo was announced as the fourth head coach in program history.

== Offseason ==
=== Departures ===
Georgia Departures
Name	Num	Pos.	Height	Year	Hometown	Reason for Departure
Trinity Turner	0	Guard	5'6"	Sophomore	Orlando, FL	Transferred to Baylor
Jocelyn Faison	1	Guard	6'1"	Freshman	Atlanta, GA	Transferred to Iowa
Savannah Henderson	2	Guard	6'3"	(redshirt) Junior	Orlando, FL	Transferred to Florida State
Dani Carnegie	3	Guard	5'9"	Sophomore	Mount Vernon, NY	Transferred to Iowa
Miyah Verse	4	Forward	6'1"	(redshirt) Sophomore	Dayton, OH	Transferred to Texas A&M
Zhen Craft	8	Forward	6'2"	Freshman	Waldorf, MD	Transferred to Tennessee
Enjulina Gonzalez	11	Guard	5'9"	Junior	Miami, FL	Transferred to Penn State
Rylie Theuerkauf	14	Guard	5'9"	Junior	Tenafly, NJ	Transferred to Tennessee
Aicha Ndour	21	Center	6'6"	Graduate Student	Somone, Senegal	Exhausted eligibility
Mia Woolfolk	33	Forward	6'3"	Sophomore	Midlothian, VA	Transferred to Vanderbilt

=== Incoming transfers ===
Georgia incoming transfers
Name	Num	Pos.	Height	Year	Hometown	Previous School
Milan Brown	0	Guard	5'8"	Sophomore	Baltimore, MD	Wake Forest
Jailyn Banks	1	Guard	5'9"	Senior	Spring Hill, TN	Belmont
Harmonie Ware	2	Guard	5'10"	Sophomore	Cleveland, TN	Arkansas
Nya Smith	3	Guard	5'9"	Junior	Roswell, GA	Purdue
Tyreona Sibley	7	Guard	5'8"	Junior	Baton Rouge, LA	McNeese
Jordan Thomas	12	Forward	6'3"	Junior	Carrollton, TX	West Virginia
Jordana Codio	13	Guard/Forward	6'1"	Graduate Student	Winter Garden, FL	Seton Hall
Blessing Adebanjo	14	Forward	6'3"	Junior	Lagos, Nigeria	Arizona
Faith Wylder	23	Center	6'6"	Junior	New York, NY	Mississippi State
Dakota Warner	24	Forward	5'11"	Sophomore	Bossier City, LA	McNeese

=== Recruiting class ===
There was no 2026 recruiting class.

== Preseason ==
On October 12, 2026, the SEC released its annual preseason media poll and awards. Georgia was picked to finish thirteenth in the conference.

=== Preseason rankings ===
SEC Preseason Poll
Place	Team
1	South Carolina
2	Texas
3	LSU
4	Vanderbilt
5	Kentucky
6	Oklahoma
7	Ole Miss
8	Tennessee
9	Mississippi State
10	Alabama
11	Texas A&M
12	Florida
13	Georgia
14	Missouri
15	Auburn
16	Arkansas

=== Preseason All-SEC Teams ===
No players were named to the All-SEC First or Second Team.

== Roster ==
2026–27 Georgia Lady Bulldogs women's basketball team
Players
Coaches

Pos.	#	Name	Height	Year	Previous school	Hometown
G	0	Milan Brown	5 ft 8 in (1.73 m)	So	Mercy High School; Wake Forest	Baltimore, MD
G	1	Jailyn Banks	5 ft 9 in (1.75 m)	Sr	Middle Tennessee Christian School; Belmont	Spring Hill, TN
G	2	Harmonie Ware	5 ft 10 in (1.78 m)	So	Bradley Central High School; Arkansas	Cleveland, TN
G	3	Nya Smith	5 ft 9 in (1.75 m)	Jr	Milton High School; Purdue	Roswell, GA
G	4	Alanna Beckham	5 ft 9 in (1.75 m)	Fr	Hebron Christian Academy	Dacula, GA
G	7	Tyreona Sibley	5 ft 8 in (1.73 m)	Jr	Central High School; McNeese	Baton Rouge, LA
G	10	Aubrey Beckham	5 ft 11 in (1.8 m)	So	Hebron Christian Academy	Dacula, GA
F	12	Jordan Thomas	6 ft 3 in (1.91 m)	Jr	Hebron Christian Academy; West Virginia	Carrollton, TX
G/F	13	Jordana Codio (5Y)	6 ft 1 in (1.85 m)	Sr	Montverde Academy; Seton Hall	Winter Garden, FL
F	14	Blessing Adebanjo	6 ft 3 in (1.91 m)	Jr	Japan Aviation High School; Arizona	Lagos, Nigeria
F	22	Vera Ojenuwa	6 ft 4 in (1.93 m)	Sr	Arkansas	Delta State, Nigeria
C	23	Faith Wylder	6 ft 6 in (1.98 m)	Jr	Potomac Classical Conservatory; Mississippi State	New York, NY
F	24	Dakota Howard	5 ft 11 in (1.8 m)	So	Parkway High School; McNeese	Bossier City, LA

Head coach

- Ayla Guzzardo (McNeese State)

Assistant coach(es)

- Kenneth Lee Jr. (Nicholls State)
- Justin Payne (Nicholls State)
- Amber Gregg (Texas–San Antonio)
- Ronneka Robertson (South Alabama)
- Brianna Patton (Georgia)

Legend

- (C) Team captain
- (S) Suspended
- (I) Ineligible
- (W) Walk-on
- (5Y) Fifth-year senior
- Injured
- Current redshirt

Roster

== Schedule and results ==
Date time, TV	Rank^{#}	Opponent^{#}	Result	Record	High points	High rebounds	High assists	Site (attendance) city, state
Non-conference regular season
November 2, 2026*; 5:00 p.m., SECN+		West Georgia	W 92–53	1–0	18 – Howard	8 – Adebanjo	4 – Beckham	Stegeman Coliseum (2,090); Athens, GA
November 5, 2026*; 7:00 p.m., SECN		Winthrop	W 75–40	2–0	17 – Howard	7 – Brown	4 – Banks	Stegeman Coliseum (1,817); Athens, GA
November 8, 2026*; 1:00 p.m., SECN+		Nicholls	W 74–48	3–0	14 – Howard	7 – Brown	3 – Tied	Stegeman Coliseum (2,594); Athens, GA
November 11, 2026*; 6:30 p.m., SECN+		Kennesaw State	W 84–42	4–0	19 – Brown	4 – Tied	3 – Tied	Stegeman Coliseum (1,881); Athens, GA
November 14, 2026*; 1:00 p.m., ESPN+		at Ohio	W 75–55	5–0	15 – Howard	10 – Howard	5 – Tied	Convocation Center (435); Athens, OH
November 18, 2026*; 6:00 p.m., ACCNX		at Georgia Tech	L 45–54	5–1	17 – Adebanjo	9 – Howard	3 – Beckham	McCamish Pavilion (3,749); Atlanta, GA
November 22, 2026*; 1:00 p.m., SECN+		Louisiana Tech	W 63–58	6–1	15 – Brown	7 – Adebanjo	5 – Banks	Stegeman Coliseum; Athens, GA
November 26, 2026*; 1:30 p.m., FloHoops		vs. Colorado; Cancun Challenge Mayan Tournament						Hard Rock Hotel Riviera Maya; Cancún, Mexico
November 27, 2026*; 1:30 p.m., FloHoops		vs. Maryland Eastern Shore; Cancun Challenge Mayan Tournament						Hard Rock Hotel Riviera Maya; Cancún, Mexico
November 28, 2026*; 1:30 p.m., FloHoops		vs. Oregon; Cancun Challenge Mayan Tournament						Hard Rock Hotel Riviera Maya; Cancún, Mexico
December 2, 2026*; 9:15 p.m., ACCN		at SMU; ACC–SEC Challenge						Moody Coliseum; University Park, TX
December 14, 2026*; 11:00 a.m., SECN+		South Carolina State						Stegeman Coliseum; Athens, GA
December 17, 2026*; 4:00 p.m., SECN+		Jacksonville						Stegeman Coliseum; Athens, GA
December 21, 2026*; 2:00 p.m., SECN+		Alabama State						Stegeman Coliseum; Athens, GA
December 28, 2026*; 3:00 p.m., SECN+		Georgia Southern						Stegeman Coliseum; Athens, GA
SEC regular season
December 31, 2026; 2:00 p.m., SECN+		Texas						Stegeman Coliseum; Athens, GA
January 3, 2027; 6:00 p.m., SECN		at Alabama						Coleman Coliseum; Tuscaloosa, AL
January 7, 2027; 7:00 p.m., SECN+		at Oklahoma						Lloyd Noble Center; Norman, OK
January 10, 2027; 12:00 p.m., SECN		Auburn						Stegeman Coliseum; Athens, GA
January 14, 2027; 6:30 p.m., SECN+		at Tennessee						Thompson–Boling Arena; Knoxville, TN
January 21, 2027; 6:30 p.m., SECN+		Arkansas						Stegeman Coliseum; Athens, GA
January 24, 2027; 3:00 p.m., SECN+		at Vanderbilt						Memorial Gymnasium; Nashville, TN
January 28, 2027; 6:00 p.m., SECN+		at Florida						O'Connell Center; Gainesville, FL
January 31, 2027; 12:00 p.m., SECN		Mississippi State						Stegeman Coliseum; Athens, GA
February 4, 2027; 9:00 p.m., SECN		at Ole Miss						SJB Pavilion; Oxford, MS
February 7, 2027; 12:00 p.m., SECN		Kentucky						Stegeman Coliseum; Athens, GA
February 11, 2027; 6:30 p.m., SECN+		Missouri						Stegeman Coliseum; Athens, GA
February 14, 2027; 3:00 p.m., SECN+		at LSU						Pete Maravich Assembly Center; Baton Rouge, LA
February 22, 2027; 7:00 p.m., SECN		at Texas A&M						Reed Arena; College Station, TX
February 25, 2027; 7:00 p.m., SECN		Florida						Stegeman Coliseum; Athens, GA
February 28, 2027; 12:00 p.m., SECN		South Carolina						Stegeman Coliseum; Athens, GA
SEC tournament
March 3–7, 2027; TBA		vs.						Bon Secours Wellness Arena; Greenville, SC
*Non-conference game. ^{#}Rankings from AP Poll. (#) Tournament seedings in parentheses. All times are in Eastern.
