= 2026–27 Texas A&M Aggies women's basketball team =

Intercollegiate basketball season

2026–27 Texas A&M Aggies women's basketball
- Conference: Southeastern Conference
- Record: 3–0 (0–0 SEC)
- Head coach: Joni Taylor (5th season)
- Associate head coach: Chelsea Newton
- Assistant coaches: Robert Mosley; Alex Varlan; Alexis Hyder
- Home arena: Reed Arena

2026–27 SEC women's basketball standings
	Conf.				Overall
Team	W		L	PCT	W		L	PCT
Alabama	0	–	0	–	4	–	0	1.000
Georgia	0	–	0	–	4	–	0	1.000
No. 12 Kentucky	0	–	0	–	4	–	0	1.000
No. 8 Vanderbilt	0	–	0	–	4	–	0	1.000
Arkansas	0	–	0	–	3	–	0	1.000
Auburn	0	–	0	–	3	–	0	1.000
Florida	0	–	0	–	3	–	0	1.000
No. 9 LSU	0	–	0	–	3	–	0	1.000
Mississippi State	0	–	0	–	3	–	0	1.000
Missouri	0	–	0	–	3	–	0	1.000
No. 14 Oklahoma	0	–	0	–	3	–	0	1.000
No. 21 Ole Miss	0	–	0	–	3	–	0	1.000
Tennessee	0	–	0	–	3	–	0	1.000
No. 6 Texas	0	–	0	–	3	–	0	1.000
Texas A&M	0	–	0	–	3	–	0	1.000
No. 1 South Carolina	0	–	0	–	2	–	0	1.000
† 2027 SEC tournament winner As of November 12, 2026; Rankings from AP poll

The 2026–27 Texas A&M Aggies women's basketball team will represent Texas A&M University during the 2026–27 NCAA Division I women's basketball season. The Aggies, led by fifth-year head coach Joni Taylor, will play their home games at the Reed Arena in College Station, Texas, and compete as members of the Southeastern Conference (SEC).

On October 12, 2026, senior transfer Essence Cody announced that she is pregnant with her first child, and would miss the entire 2026–27 season.

== Previous season ==
The Aggies finished the 2025–26 season 14–13 overall and 7–9 in SEC play, to finish in a two-way tie for tenth in the conference alongside Alabama. As the No. 10 seed in the SEC tournament, they suffered a 49–50 upset to No. 15 Auburn.

Following their SEC tournament, elimination, the Aggies earned an at-large bid to the WBIT, their first appearance in the tournament since its creation in 2024, where they were given one of the four No. 1 seeds. They lost in the first round 48–68 to McNeese to end their season.

== Offseason ==
=== Departures ===
Texas A&M Departures
Name	Number	Pos.	Height	Year	Hometown	Reason for Departure
Ny'Ceara Pryor	1	Guard	5'3"	Senior	Baltimore, MD	Graduated; went undrafted in the 2026 WNBA draft, signed a training camp contract with the New York Liberty
Jordan Webster	6	Guard	5'10"	Graduate Student	Dallas, TX	Graduated
Lemyah Hylton	10	Guard	5'11"	Senior	Mississauga, ON	Graduated
Talia Kavoka	11	Guard	5'6"	Freshman	Évry-Courcouronnes, France	Transferred to New Mexico State
Lauren Ware	32	Forward	6'5"	Graduate Student	Bismarck, ND	Graduated
Fatmata Janneh	44	Forward	6'2"	Junior	London, England	Transferred to Tennessee

=== Incoming transfers ===
Texas A&M incoming transfers
Name	Number	Pos.	Height	Year	Hometown	Previous School
Kaniya Boyd	0	Guard	5'9"	(redshirt) Junior	Las Vegas, NV	Tennessee
Miyah Verse	2	Forward	6'1"	(redshirt) Junior	Dayton, OH	Georgia
Kailyn Gilbert	16	Guard	5'8"	Graduate Student	Tampa Bay, FL	LSU
Essence Cody	21	Forward	6'4"	Senior	Valdosta, GA	Alabama

=== Recruiting class ===
College recruiting
Name	Hometown	School	Height	Weight	Commit date
Rieyan DeSouze; G	DeSoto, TX	Legion Prep Academy	5 ft 6 in (1.68 m)	N/A	
Rieyan DeSouze; G	Recruit ratings: Rivals: 247Sports: ESPN: (94)				
Jayda Porter; F	Columbia, MO	Rock Bridge High School	6 ft 3 in (1.91 m)	N/A	
Jayda Porter; F	Recruit ratings: Rivals: 247Sports: ESPN: (94)				
Overall recruit ranking: ESPN: 22
Note: In many cases, Scout, Rivals, 247Sports, On3, and ESPN may conflict in their listings of height and weight.; In these cases, the average was taken. ESPN grades are on a 100-point scale.; Sources: "2026 Player Commits". ESPN. Archived from the original on August 3, 2026.

== Preseason ==
On October 12, 2026, the SEC released its annual preseason media poll and awards. Texas A&M was picked to finish eleventh in the conference.

=== Preseason rankings ===
SEC Preseason Poll
Place	Team
1	South Carolina
2	Texas
3	LSU
4	Vanderbilt
5	Kentucky
6	Oklahoma
7	Ole Miss
8	Tennessee
9	Mississippi State
10	Alabama
11	Texas A&M
12	Florida
13	Georgia
14	Missouri
15	Auburn
16	Arkansas

=== Preseason All-SEC Teams ===
No players were named to the All-SEC First or Second Team.

== Roster ==
2026–27 Texas A&M Aggies women's basketball team
Players
Coaches

Pos.	#	Name	Height	Year	Previous school	Hometown
G	0	Kaniya Boyd	5 ft 9 in (1.75 m)	RS Jr	Centennial High School; Tennessee	Las Vegas, NV
F	2	Miyah Verse	6 ft 1 in (1.85 m)	RS Jr	Arizona Elite Prep; Georgia	Dayton, OH
G	3	Rieyan DeSouze	5 ft 7 in (1.7 m)	Fr	Legion Prep Academy	DeSoto, TX
G	4	Chaney Spencer	5 ft 9 in (1.75 m)	So	Lake Creek High School	Montgomery, TX
F	5	Vanessa Saidu	6 ft 2 in (1.88 m)	RS Jr	Robbinsdale Cooper High School	Minneapolis, MN
G	7	Pien Steenbergen	6 ft 1 in (1.85 m)	RS Sr	Calandlyceum; Liberty	Berlicum, Netherlands
F	14	Jayda Porter	6 ft 3 in (1.91 m)	Fr	Rock Bridge High School	Columbia, MO
F	15	Ibifaa Azogu	5 ft 11 in (1.8 m)	So	Bridgeland High School	Cypress, TX
G	16	Kailyn Gilbert	5 ft 8 in (1.73 m)	GS	IMG Academy; LSU	Tampa Bay, FL
G	20	Janae Kent	6 ft 1 in (1.85 m)	Sr	Oak Forest High School; LSU	Oak Forest, IL
F	21	Essence Cody (injured)	6 ft 4 in (1.93 m)	Sr	Valdosta High School; Alabama	Valdosta, GA
G	23	Gianna Gentry	5 ft 9 in (1.75 m)	So	Shadow Creek High School	Pearland, TX
C	24	Emerald Parker	6 ft 3 in (1.91 m)	Jr	Carroll High School; Little Rock	Ruston, LA
G	25	Salese Blow	5 ft 10 in (1.78 m)	Sr	Plano Senior High School; Wichita State	Murphy, TX
F	26	Anita Franchini	6 ft 1 in (1.85 m)	So		Verona, Italy

Head coach

- Joni Taylor (Alabama)

Assistant coach(es)

- Chelsea Newton (Rutgers)
- Robert Mosley (Miles)
- Alex Varlan (Tennessee)
- Alexis Hyder (LSU)

Legend

- (C) Team captain
- (S) Suspended
- (I) Ineligible
- (W) Walk-on
- Injured
- Current redshirt

Roster
Last update: August 3, 2026

== Schedule and results ==
Date time, TV	Rank^{#}	Opponent^{#}	Result	Record	High points	High rebounds	High assists	Site (attendance) city, state
Non-conference regular season
November 2, 2026*; 7:00 p.m., SECN+/ESPN+		Arkansas–Pine Bluff	W 77–54	1–0	30 – Gilbert	11 – Gilbert	6 – Gilbert	Reed Arena (2,222); College Station, TX
November 5, 2026*; 8:00 p.m., SECN		Louisiana	W 62–51	2–0	20 – Parker	11 – Gilbert	7 – Gilbert	Reed Arena (2,118); College Station, TX
November 7, 2026*; 11:00 a.m., SECN+/ESPN+		LSU New Orleans	W 90–63	3–0	22 – Parker	9 – Verse	8 – Gilbert	Reed Arena (2,187); College Station, TX
November 16, 2026*; 4:00 p.m., SECN+/ESPN+		Lamar						Reed Arena; College Station, TX
November 18, 2026*; 11:00 a.m., SECN+/ESPN+		East Texas A&M						Reed Arena; College Station, TX
November 21, 2026*; 3:00 p.m., SECN+/ESPN+		Incarnate Word						Reed Arena; College Station, TX
November 27, 2026*; 10:00 a.m.		vs. Bowling Green; Florida Gulf Classic						Community School of Naples; Naples, FL
November 28, 2026*; 2:30 p.m.		vs. Charlotte; Florida Gulf Classic						Community School of Naples; Naples, FL
December 3, 2026*; 8:00 p.m., ACCN		at California; ACC–SEC Challenge						Haas Pavilion; Berkeley, CA
December 6, 2026*; 11:00 a.m., SECN+/ESPN+		Hofstra						Reed Arena; College Station, TX
December 12, 2026*; 11:00 a.m., BTN		at Nebraska						Pinnacle Bank Arena; Lincoln, NE
December 15, 2026*; 7:00 p.m., SECN+/ESPN+		Tarleton State						Reed Arena; College Station, TX
December 17, 2026*; 2:00 p.m., SECN+/ESPN+		Sam Houston						Reed Arena; College Station, TX
December 22, 2026*; 12:00 p.m., SECN+/ESPN+		Prairie View A&M						Reed Arena; College Station, TX
SEC regular season
December 31, 2026; 2:00 p.m., SECN+/ESPN+		Tennessee						Reed Arena; College Station, TX
January 3, 2027; 2:00 p.m., SECN+/ESPN+		at Mississippi State						Humphrey Coliseum; Starkville, MS
January 7, 2027; 8:00 p.m., SECN		at LSU						Pete Maravich Assembly Center; Baton Rouge, LA
January 10, 2027; 2:00 p.m., SECN+/ESPN+		Missouri						Reed Arena; College Station, TX
January 14, 2027; 8:30 p.m., SECN		at Vanderbilt						Memorial Gymnasium; Nashville, TN
January 21, 2027; 8:00 p.m., SECN		Texas; Lone Star Showdown						Reed Arena; College Station, TX
January 24, 2027; 2:00 p.m., SECN+/ESPN+		at Auburn						Neville Arena; Auburn, AL
January 28, 2027; 7:00 p.m., SECN+/ESPN+		Ole Miss						Reed Arena; College Station, TX
January 31, 2027; 1:00 p.m., SECN		Oklahoma						Reed Arena; College Station, TX
February 4, 2027; 6:30 p.m., SECN+/ESPN+		at Arkansas						Bud Walton Arena; Fayetteville, AR
February 7, 2027; 2:00 p.m., SECN+/ESPN+		Florida						Reed Arena; College Station, TX
February 11, 2027; 5:00 p.m., SECN		at South Carolina						Colonial Life Arena; Columbia, SC
February 14, 2027; 3:00 p.m., SECN		at Texas; Lone Star Showdown						Moody Center; Austin, TX
February 22, 2027; 6:00 p.m., SECN		Georgia						Reed Arena; College Station, TX
February 25, 2027; 7:00 p.m., SECN+/ESPN+		Kentucky						Reed Arena; College Station, TX
February 28, 2027; 2:00 p.m., SECN+/ESPN+		at Alabama						Coleman Coliseum; Tuscaloosa, AL
SEC tournament
March 3–7, 2027; TBA		vs.						Bon Secours Wellness Arena; Greenville, SC
*Non-conference game. ^{#}Rankings from AP Poll. (#) Tournament seedings in parentheses. All times are in Central.
