= 2026–27 Oklahoma Sooners women's basketball team =

American collegiate basketball season

2026–27 Oklahoma Sooners women's basketball
- Conference: Southeastern Conference

Ranking
- Coaches: No. 14
- AP: No. 14
- Record: 6–0 (0–0 SEC)
- Head coach: Jennie Baranczyk (6th season)
- Assistant coaches: Shannon Gage; Michael Neal; Markisha Kastantin
- Home arena: Lloyd Noble Center

2026–27 SEC women's basketball standings
| | Conf. | | | | Overall |
| Team | W | | L | PCT | W | | L | PCT |
|---|---|---|---|---|---|---|---|---|
| No. 9 LSU | 0 | – | 0 | – | 6 | – | 0 | 1.000 |
| No. 14 Oklahoma | 0 | – | 0 | – | 6 | – | 0 | 1.000 |
| Tennessee | 0 | – | 0 | – | 6 | – | 0 | 1.000 |
| Arkansas | 0 | – | 0 | – | 5 | – | 0 | 1.000 |
| No. 12 Kentucky | 0 | – | 0 | – | 5 | – | 0 | 1.000 |
| Mississippi State | 0 | – | 0 | – | 5 | – | 0 | 1.000 |
| Missouri | 0 | – | 0 | – | 5 | – | 0 | 1.000 |
| No. 1 South Carolina | 0 | – | 0 | – | 5 | – | 0 | 1.000 |
| No. 6 Texas | 0 | – | 0 | – | 5 | – | 0 | 1.000 |
| Texas A&M | 0 | – | 0 | – | 5 | – | 0 | 1.000 |
| Alabama | 0 | – | 0 | – | 6 | – | 1 | .857 |
| Georgia | 0 | – | 0 | – | 5 | – | 1 | .833 |
| No. 11 Vanderbilt | 0 | – | 0 | – | 5 | – | 1 | .833 |
| Auburn | 0 | – | 0 | – | 4 | – | 1 | .800 |
| No. 19т Ole Miss | 0 | – | 0 | – | 4 | – | 1 | .800 |
| Florida | 0 | – | 0 | – | 4 | – | 2 | .667 |
† 2027 SEC tournament winner As of November 20, 2026; Rankings from AP poll

The 2026–27 Oklahoma Sooners women's basketball team currently represents the University of Oklahoma during the 2026–27 NCAA Division I women's basketball season. The Sooners, led by sixth-year head coach Jennie Baranczyk, play their home games at the Lloyd Noble Center in Norman, Oklahoma, and competes as members of the Southeastern Conference (SEC).

== Previous season ==
The Sooners finished the 2025–26 season 26–8 overall and 11–5 in SEC play, finishing fifth in the conference. As the No. 5 seed in the SEC tournament, they defeated No. 11 Florida 82–64 in the second round before losing to No. 4 LSU 78–112 in the quarterfinals.

Following the SEC tournament, the Sooners received an at-large bid to the NCAA tournament, where they were seeded No. 4 in the Sacramento #4 Regional. They defeated No. 11 seeded Idaho 89–59 and No. 5 Michigan State 77–71 in the first and second rounds respectively, before falling to fellow SEC member and No. 1 South Carolina 68–94 in the Sweet Sixteen to end their season. In January, the Sooners handed the Gamecocks their only loss of the SEC regular season in a 94–82 overtime win at home.

== Offseason ==
=== Departures ===
Oklahoma Departures
| Name | Number | Pos. | Height | Year | Hometown | Reason for departure |
|---|---|---|---|---|---|---|
| Beatrice Culliton | 0 | Center | 6'3" | Senior | Overland Park, KS | Graduated |
| Zya Vann | 3 | Guard | 5'9" | Sophomore | Edmond, OK | Transferred to Texas |
| Payton Verhulst | 12 | Guard | 6'1" | (redshirt) Senior | De Soto, KS | Graduated |
| Raegan Beers | 15 | Center | 6'4" | Senior | Littleton, CO | Graduated; went undrafted in the 2026 WNBA draft, signed a training camp contract with the Connecticut Sun |

=== Incoming transfers ===
Oklahoma incoming transfers
| Name | Number | Pos. | Height | Year | Hometown | Previous School |
|---|---|---|---|---|---|---|
| Sa'Myah Smith | 5 | Forward | 6'2" | 5th Year | Texarkana, TX | Virginia |
| Isimenme Ozzy-Momodu | 9 | Forward | 6'3" | 5th Year | London, England | Maryland |
| Jordan Speiser | 23 | Guard | 6'1" | Sophomore | Warrenton, MO | Kansas State |
| Keeley Parks | 24 | Guard | 5'11" | Sophomore | Norman, OK | Kansas |

=== Recruiting class ===
College recruiting
| Name | Hometown | School | Height | Weight | Commit date |
|---|---|---|---|---|---|
| Alliyah Bell; F | Minot, ND | Minot Senior High School | 6 ft 2 in (1.88 m) | N/A | |
| Alliyah Bell; F | Recruit ratings: Rivals: 247Sports: ESPN: (95) | | | | |
| Vienna Murray; G | Woodbury, MN | East Ridge High School | 6 ft 1 in (1.85 m) | N/A | |
| Vienna Murray; G | Recruit ratings: ESPN: (92) | | | | |
Overall recruit ranking: ESPN: 21
Note: In many cases, Scout, Rivals, 247Sports, On3, and ESPN may conflict in their listings of height and weight.; In these cases, the average was taken. ESPN grades are on a 100-point scale.; Sources: "2026 Player Commits". ESPN. Archived from the original on August 1, 2026.

==== 2027 recruiting class ====
College recruiting (2027)
| Name | Hometown | School | Height | Weight | Commit date |
|---|---|---|---|---|---|
| Finley Chastain; G | Celina, TX | Walnut Grove High School | 6 ft 0 in (1.83 m) | N/A | |
| Finley Chastain; G | Recruit ratings: 247Sports: ESPN: (93) | | | | |
Overall recruit ranking:
Note: In many cases, Scout, Rivals, 247Sports, On3, and ESPN may conflict in their listings of height and weight.; In these cases, the average was taken. ESPN grades are on a 100-point scale.; Sources: "2027 Player Commits". ESPN. Archived from the original on September 27, 2025.

== Preseason ==
On October 12, 2026, the SEC released its annual preseason media poll and awards. Oklahoma was picked to finish sixth in the conference.

=== Preseason rankings ===
SEC Preseason Poll
| Place | Team |
|---|---|
| 1 | South Carolina |
| 2 | Texas |
| 3 | LSU |
| 4 | Vanderbilt |
| 5 | Kentucky |
| 6 | Oklahoma |
| 7 | Ole Miss |
| 8 | Tennessee |
| 9 | Mississippi State |
| 10 | Alabama |
| 11 | Texas A&M |
| 12 | Florida |
| 13 | Georgia |
| 14 | Missouri |
| 15 | Auburn |
| 16 | Arkansas |

=== Preseason All-SEC Teams ===
Preseason All-SEC Teams
| Player | Year | Position | Team |
|---|---|---|---|
| Aaliyah Chavez | Sophomore | Guard | Second |

== Roster ==
Years are listed according to new NCAA five-in-five eligibility regulations.

2026–27 Oklahoma Sooners women's basketball team
Players
Coaches

| Pos. | # | Name | Height | Year | Previous school | Hometown |
|---|---|---|---|---|---|---|
| G | 2 | Aaliyah Chavez | 5 ft 10 in (1.78 m) | So | Monterey High School | Lubbock, TX |
| F | 4 | Caya Smith | 6 ft 1 in (1.85 m) | Jr | Putnam City West High School | Oklahoma City, OK |
| F | 5 | Sa'Myah Smith (5th) | 6 ft 2 in (1.88 m) | Sr | DeSoto High School; Virginia | Texarkana, TX |
| F | 6 | Sahara Williams | 5 ft 11 in (1.8 m) | Sr | West High School | Waterloo, IA |
| F | 9 | Isimenme Ozzy-Momodou (5th) | 6 ft 3 in (1.91 m) | Sr | Maryland | London, England |
| F | 10 | Emma Tolan | 5 ft 11 in (1.8 m) | So | Virginia College | Virginia, Cavan, Ireland |
| G | 11 | Vienna Murray | 6 ft 1 in (1.85 m) | Fr | East Ridge High School | Woodbury, MN |
| G | 16 | Sina Höllerl | 6 ft 0 in (1.83 m) | Fr | Duchess Klosterneuburg | Klosterneuburg, Austria |
| F | 21 | Brooklyn Stewart | 6 ft 3 in (1.91 m) | So | Pine Creek High School | Colorado Springs, CO |
| G | 22 | Keziah Lofton | 6 ft 0 in (1.83 m) | So | Bethany High School | Bethany, OK |
| G | 23 | Jordan Speiser | 6 ft 1 in (1.85 m) | So | Lutheran of St. Charles County; Kansas State | Warrenton, MO |
| G | 24 | Keeley Parks (injured) | 5 ft 11 in (1.8 m) | So | Norman High School; Kansas | Norman, OK |
| C | 26 | Daffa Cissoko | 6 ft 4 in (1.93 m) | So | Pays Voironnais Basket Club | Draveil, Paris, France |
| F | 30 | LeeLee Bell | 6 ft 1 in (1.85 m) | Fr | Minot High School | Minot, ND |

Head coach

- Jennie Baranczyk (Iowa)

Assistant coach(es)

- Shannon Gage (Missouri State)
- Michael Neal (Oklahoma)
- Markisha Kastantin (Notre Dame)

Legend

- (C) Team captain
- (S) Suspended
- (I) Ineligible
- (W) Walk-on
- (5th) Fifth year senior
- Injured
- Current redshirt

Roster
Last update: August 15, 2026

== Schedule and results ==
| Date time, TV | Rank^{#} | Opponent^{#} | Result | Record | High points | High rebounds | High assists | Site (attendance) city, state |
Exhibition
| October 25, 2026*; 2:00 p.m. | No. 21 | Southern Nazarene | W 124–39 | | 21 – Stewart | 9 – Stewart | 9 – Chavez | Lloyd Noble Center (1,813); Norman, OK |
Regular season
| November 2, 2026*; 1:30 p.m., ESPN2 | No. 21 | vs. No. 12 North Carolina; Oui-Play Paris | W 91–79 | 1–0 | 25 – Bell | 8 – Bell | 6 – Chavez | Adidas Arena (5,000); Paris, France |
| November 8, 2026*; 2:00 p.m., SECN+/ESPN+ | No. 21 | Morgan State | W 95–38 | 2–0 | 20 – Bell | 12 – Bell | 7 – Lofton | Lloyd Noble Center (3,535); Norman, OK |
| November 10, 2026*; 6:00 p.m., SECN+/ESPN+ | No. 14 | San Jose State | W 98–44 | 3–0 | 18 – Stewart | 12 – Bell | 7 – Williams | Lloyd Noble Center (3,227); Norman, OK |
| November 13, 2026*; 10:30 a.m., SECN+/ESPN+ | No. 14 | Oral Roberts | W 93–62 | 4–0 | 21 – Williams | 13 – S. Smith | 10 – Williams | Lloyd Noble Center (8,415); Norman, OK |
| November 17, 2026*; 8:00 p.m., SECN | No. 14 | Texas Southern | W 124–48 | 5–0 | 21 – Stewart | 10 – Tied | 10 – Williams | Lloyd Noble Center (3,824); Norman, OK |
| November 19, 2026*; 6:00 p.m., SECN+/ESPN+ | No. 14 | Northwestern State | W 113–43 | 6–0 | 22 – Chavez | 14 – Bell | 9 – Chavez | Lloyd Noble Center (3,306); Norman, OK |
| November 23, 2026*; 1:30 p.m. | | vs. Virginia; Jacksonville Classic | | | | | | The Reef; Jacksonville, FL |
| November 24, 2026*; 3:00 p.m. | | vs. Montana State; Jacksonville Classic | | | | | | The Reef; Jacksonville, FL |
| December 3, 2026*; 6:00 p.m., ESPNU | | at Syracuse; ACC–SEC Challenge | | | | | | JMA Wireless Dome; Syracuse, NY |
| December 5, 2026*; 1:00 p.m., FOX | | vs. Michigan; Women's Champion Classic | | | | | | Barclays Center; Brooklyn, NY |
| December 9, 2026*; 6:00 p.m., SECN | | SIU Edwardsville | | | | | | Lloyd Noble Center; Norman, OK |
| December 12, 2026*; 11:00 a.m., ESPN2 | | vs. Oklahoma State; Bedlam Series | | | | | | Paycom Center; Oklahoma City, OK |
| December 17, 2026*; 5:00 p.m., SECN+/ESPN+ | | Southern | | | | | | Lloyd Noble Center; Norman, OK |
| December 21, 2026*; 1:00 p.m., SECN+/ESPN+ | | Louisiana–Monroe | | | | | | Lloyd Noble Center; Norman, OK |
| December 31, 2026; 7:00 p.m., ESPN2 | | at Ole Miss | | | | | | SJB Pavilion; Oxford, MS |
| January 3, 2027; 3:00 p.m., SECN | | Missouri | | | | | | Lloyd Noble Center; Norman, OK |
| January 7, 2027; 6:00 p.m., SECN+/ESPN+ | | Georgia | | | | | | Lloyd Noble Center; Norman, OK |
| January 10, 2027; 4:00 p.m., ESPN | | at Tennessee | | | | | | Thompson–Boling Arena; Knoxville, TN |
| January 14, 2027; 6:30 p.m., ESPN | | at South Carolina | | | | | | Colonial Life Arena; Columbia, SC |
| January 18, 2027*; 11:00 a.m., FOX | | vs. UCLA; Coretta Scott King Classic | | | | | | Prudential Center; Newark, NJ |
| January 21, 2027; 6:30 p.m., SECN+/ESPN+ | | at Mississippi State | | | | | | Humphrey Coliseum; Starkville, MS |
| January 24, 2027; 1:00 p.m., ESPN/ESPN2/ESPNU | | Kentucky | | | | | | Lloyd Noble Center; Norman, OK |
| January 28, 2027; 8:00 p.m., ESPN2 | | Vanderbilt | | | | | | Lloyd Noble Center; Norman, OK |
| January 31, 2027; 1:00 p.m., SECN | | at Texas A&M | | | | | | Reed Arena; College Station, TX |
| February 4, 2027; 6:00 p.m., SECN+/ESPN+ | | Alabama | | | | | | Lloyd Noble Center; Norman, OK |
| February 8, 2027; 6:00 p.m., ESPN2 | | South Carolina | | | | | | Lloyd Noble Center; Norman, OK |
| February 11, 2027; 6:30 p.m., SECN+/ESPN+ | | at Arkansas | | | | | | Bud Walton Arena; Fayetteville, AR |
| February 14, 2027; 11:00 a.m., SECN | | at Florida | | | | | | O'Connell Center; Gainesville, FL |
| February 21, 2027; 2:00 p.m., SECN+/ESPN+ | | Auburn | | | | | | Lloyd Noble Center; Norman, OK |
| February 25, 2027; 7:00 p.m., ESPN2 | | Texas | | | | | | Lloyd Noble Center; Norman, OK |
| February 28, 2027; 1:00 p.m., ESPN/ESPN2 | | at LSU | | | | | | Pete Maravich Assembly Center; Baton Rouge, LA |
SEC tournament
| March 3–7, 2027; TBA | | vs. | | | | | | Bon Secours Wellness Arena; Greenville, SC |
*Non-conference game. ^{#}Rankings from AP Poll. (#) Tournament seedings in parentheses. All times are in Central.

== Rankings ==
Ranking movements Legend: ██ Increase in ranking ██ Decrease in ranking
| | Week | | | | | | | | | | | | | | | | | | | | |
| Poll | Pre | 1 | 2 | 3 | 4 | 5 | 6 | 7 | 8 | 9 | 10 | 11 | 12 | 13 | 14 | 15 | 16 | 17 | 18 | 19 | Final |
|---|---|---|---|---|---|---|---|---|---|---|---|---|---|---|---|---|---|---|---|---|---|
| AP | 21 | 14 | 14 | | | | | | | | | | | | | | | | | | |
| Coaches | 21 | 14 | 14 | | | | | | | | | | | | | | | | | | |

== See also ==
- 2026–27 Oklahoma Sooners men's basketball team
