= 2026–27 Ole Miss Rebels women's basketball team =

Intercollegiate basketball season

2026–27 Ole Miss Rebels women's basketball
- Conference: Southeastern Conference

Ranking
- Coaches: No. 22
- AP: No. 19т
- Record: 4–1 (0–0 SEC)
- Head coach: Yolett McPhee-McCuin (9th season)
- Associate head coach: Quentin Hillsman
- Assistant coaches: Joy Smith; Zachary Hopp; Adrienne Motley; Myah Taylor
- Home arena: SJB Pavilion

2026–27 SEC women's basketball standings
| | Conf. | | | | Overall |
| Team | W | | L | PCT | W | | L | PCT |
|---|---|---|---|---|---|---|---|---|
| Arkansas | 0 | – | 0 | – | 5 | – | 0 | 1.000 |
| Georgia | 0 | – | 0 | – | 5 | – | 0 | 1.000 |
| No. 12 Kentucky | 0 | – | 0 | – | 5 | – | 0 | 1.000 |
| No. 9 LSU | 0 | – | 0 | – | 5 | – | 0 | 1.000 |
| Mississippi State | 0 | – | 0 | – | 5 | – | 0 | 1.000 |
| Missouri | 0 | – | 0 | – | 5 | – | 0 | 1.000 |
| No. 14 Oklahoma | 0 | – | 0 | – | 5 | – | 0 | 1.000 |
| No. 1 South Carolina | 0 | – | 0 | – | 5 | – | 0 | 1.000 |
| Tennessee | 0 | – | 0 | – | 5 | – | 0 | 1.000 |
| No. 19т Ole Miss | 0 | – | 0 | – | 4 | – | 0 | 1.000 |
| No. 6 Texas | 0 | – | 0 | – | 4 | – | 0 | 1.000 |
| Texas A&M | 0 | – | 0 | – | 4 | – | 0 | 1.000 |
| Alabama | 0 | – | 0 | – | 5 | – | 1 | .833 |
| Auburn | 0 | – | 0 | – | 4 | – | 1 | .800 |
| No. 11 Vanderbilt | 0 | – | 0 | – | 4 | – | 1 | .800 |
| Florida | 0 | – | 0 | – | 3 | – | 2 | .600 |
† 2027 SEC tournament winner As of November 19, 2026; Rankings from AP poll

The 2026–27 Ole Miss Rebels women's basketball team currently represents the University of Mississippi (Ole Miss) during the 2026–27 NCAA Division I women's basketball season. The Rebels, led by ninth-year head coach Yolett McPhee-McCuin, play their home games at SJB Pavilion in Oxford, Mississippi, and compete as a member of the Southeastern Conference (SEC).

== Previous season ==
The Rebels finished the 2025–26 season 24–12 overall and 8–8 in SEC play, to finish in a four-way tie for sixth in the conference alongside Tennessee, Georgia and Kentucky. As the No. 7 seed in the SEC tournament, they defeated No. 15 Auburn and upset No. 2 Vanderbilt in the second round and quarterfinals respectively, before falling to eventual tournament champions No. 3 Texas in the semifinals.

Following their SEC tournament elimination, the Rebels earned an at-large bid to the NCAA tournament, where they were seeded No. 5 in the Sacramento #2 Regional. They defeated No. 12 Gonzaga in the first round before losing to No. 4 Minnesota 63–65 in the second round from a game-winning buzzer-beater shot by Minnesota guard Amaya Battle.

== Offseason ==
=== Departures ===
Ole Miss Departures
| Name | Number | Pos. | Height | Year | Hometown | Reason for Departure |
|---|---|---|---|---|---|---|
| Sira Thienou | 0 | Guard | 6'1" | Sophomore | Bamako, Mali | Transferred to Auburn |
| Kaitlin Peterson | 3 | Guard | 5'9" | Senior | Eufaula, AL | Graduated |
| Jayla Murray | 4 | Forward | 6'1" | Senior | St. Louis, MO | Graduated |
| Latasha Lattimore | 8 | Forward | 6'4" | Senior | Toronto, Ontario | Graduated; drafted 21st overall by the Chicago Sky in the 2026 WNBA draft |
| J'Adore Young | 10 | Center | 6'4" | Sophomore | Mauldin, SC | Transferred to Providence |
| Christeen Iwuala | 12 | Forward | 6'3" | Senior | San Antonio, TX | Graduated; went undrafted in the 2026 WNBA draft, signed a training camp contract with the Washington Mystics |
| Debreasha Powe | 21 | Guard/Forward | 6'1" | Senior | Meridian, MS | Graduated |
| Denim DeShields | 22 | Guard | 5'5" | Senior | Atlanta, GA | Graduated |
| Cotie McMahon | 32 | Forward | 6'0" | Senior | Dayton, OH | Graduated; drafted 11th overall by the Washington Mystics in the 2026 WNBA draft |
| Tianna Thompson | 35 | Guard | 5'10" | Sophomore | Atlanta, GA | Transferred to Baylor |

=== Incoming transfers ===
Ole Miss incoming transfers
| Name | Number | Pos. | Height | Year | Hometown | Previous School |
|---|---|---|---|---|---|---|
| Knisha Godfrey | 4 | Guard | 5'9" | Senior | Columbus, OH | Florida |
| Maya Anderson | 5 | Guard/Forward | 6'1" | Junior | Toronto, Ontario | San Jose State |
| Jaida Civil | 15 | Guard | 6'0" | Sophomore | Vero Beach, FL | Tennessee |
| Emily Howard | 20 | Center | 6'5" | Senior | Vancouver, British Columbia | Boise State |
| Doneelah Washington | 22 | Forward | 6'1" | Junior | Lincoln, NE | Illinois State |
| Jade Tillman | 24 | Guard | 6'1" | Senior | Rockville, MD | UMBC |
| Rachel Okokoh | 25 | Forward | 6'4" | Sophomore | Montreal, Quebec | Penn State |
| Jada Richard | 30 | Guard | 5'7" | Junior | Opelousas, LA | LSU |
| Talaysia Cooper | 55 | Guard | 6'0" | Senior | Turbeville, SC | Tennessee |

=== Recruiting class ===
There was no 2026 recruiting class.

== Preseason ==
On October 12, 2026, the SEC released its annual preseason media poll and awards. Oklahoma was picked to finish sixth in the conference.

=== Preseason rankings ===
SEC Preseason Poll
| Place | Team |
|---|---|
| 1 | South Carolina |
| 2 | Texas |
| 3 | LSU |
| 4 | Vanderbilt |
| 5 | Kentucky |
| 6 | Oklahoma |
| 7 | Ole Miss |
| 8 | Tennessee |
| 9 | Mississippi State |
| 10 | Alabama |
| 11 | Texas A&M |
| 12 | Florida |
| 13 | Georgia |
| 14 | Missouri |
| 15 | Auburn |
| 16 | Arkansas |

=== Preseason All-SEC Teams ===
Preseason All-SEC Teams
| Player | Year | Position | Team |
|---|---|---|---|
| Talaysia Cooper | Senior | Guard | Second |

== Roster ==
Years are listed according to the new NCAA age-based eligibility model.

2026–27 Ole Miss Rebels women's basketball team
Players
Coaches

| Pos. | # | Name | Height | Year | Previous school | Hometown |
|---|---|---|---|---|---|---|
| G | 2 | Lauren Jacobs | 5 ft 9 in (1.75 m) | So | Heathwood Hall Episcopal School | Columbia, SC |
| G | 4 | Knisha Godfrey (6th) | 5 ft 9 in (1.75 m) | Sr | Tampa Bay Technical High School; Florida | Columbus, OH |
| G/F | 5 | Maya Anderson | 6 ft 1 in (1.85 m) | Jr | Crestwood Preparatory College; San Jose State | Toronto, Ontario |
| C | 7 | Desrae Kyles | 6 ft 5 in (1.96 m) | Jr | Benton Harbor High School; Central Michigan | Benton Harbor, MI |
| G | 12 | Charleen Hudson | 5 ft 6 in (1.68 m) | Fr | Springdale High School | Springdale, AR |
| G | 15 | Jaida Civil | 6 ft 0 in (1.83 m) | So | Palm Bay Magnet High School; Tennessee | Vero Beach, FL |
| C | 20 | Emily Howard | 6 ft 5 in (1.96 m) | Sr | Harding Academy; Boise State | Vancouver, British Columbia |
| F | 22 | Doneelah Washington | 6 ft 1 in (1.85 m) | Jr | Lincoln Northeast High School; Illinois State | Lincoln, NE |
| G | 24 | Jade Tillman | 6 ft 1 in (1.85 m) | Sr | Our Lady of Good Counsel High School; UMBC | Rockville, MD |
| F | 25 | Rachel Okokoh | 6 ft 4 in (1.93 m) | So | Capital Courts Academy; Penn State | Montreal, Quebec |
| G | 30 | Jada Richard | 5 ft 7 in (1.7 m) | Jr | Lafayette Christian Academy; LSU | Opelousas, LA |
| G | 55 | Talaysia Cooper (5th) | 6 ft 0 in (1.83 m) | Sr | East Clarendon High School; Tennessee | Turbeville, SC |

Head coach

- Yolett McPhee-McCuin (Rhode Island)

Assistant coach(es)

- Quentin Hillsman (St. Mary's (MD))
- Joy Smith (Duke)
- Zachary Hopp (Kansas)
- Adrienne Motley (Miami (FL))
- Myah Taylor (Mississippi)

Legend

- (C) Team captain
- (S) Suspended
- (I) Ineligible
- (W) Walk-on
- (5th) Fifth year senior
- (6th) Sixth year senior
- Injured
- Current redshirt

Roster
Last update: August 1, 2026

== Schedule and results ==
| Date time, TV | Rank^{#} | Opponent^{#} | Result | Record | High points | High rebounds | High assists | Site (attendance) city, state |
Exhibition
| October 28, 2026*; 6:00 p.m. | No. 19 | Lane College | W 112–37 | | – | – | – | SJB Pavilion; Oxford, MS |
Non-conference regular season
| November 2, 2026*; 11:00 a.m., SECN+/ESPN+ | No. 19 | Alcorn State | W 80–38 | 1–0 | 17 – Civil | 11 – Tillman | 5 – Civil | SJB Pavilion (8,412); Oxford, MS |
| November 5, 2026*; 6:00 p.m., SECN+/ESPN+ | No. 19 | North Alabama | W 72–51 | 2–0 | 17 – Richard | 6 – Civil | 5 – Tied | SJB Pavilion (2,326); Oxford, MS |
| November 11, 2026*; 6:00 p.m., SECN+/ESPN+ | No. 21 | Albany | W 95–41 | 3–0 | 29 – Cooper | 7 – Civil | 8 – Richard | SJB Pavilion (2,305); Oxford, MS |
| November 15, 2026*; 2:00 p.m., SECN+/ESPN+ | No. 21 | Louisiana Tech | W 69–53 | 4–0 | 13 – Cooper | 10 – Kyles | 5 – Richard | SJB Pavilion (2,704); Oxford, MS |
| November 18, 2026*; 6:00 p.m., FS1 | No. 19т | at No. 19т Ohio State | L 57–60 | 4–1 | 14 – Cooper | 7 – Cooper | 5 – Cooper | Schottenstein Center (4,812); Columbus, OH |
| November 22, 2026*; 2:00 p.m., SECN+/ESPN+ | No. 19т | Alabama A&M | | | | | | SJB Pavilion; Oxford, MS |
| November 29, 2026*; 2:00 p.m., SECN | | Memphis | | | | | | SJB Pavilion; Oxford, MS |
| December 2, 2026*; 6:15 p.m., ESPNU | | NC State; ACC-SEC Challenge | | | | | | SJB Pavilion; Oxford, MS |
| December 6, 2026*; 2:00 p.m., SECN+/ESPN+ | | Louisiana–Monroe | | | | | | SJB Pavilion; Oxford, MS |
| December 12, 2026*; 12:00 p.m., SECN+/ESPN+ | | South Carolina State | | | | | | SJB Pavilion; Oxford, MS |
| December 15, 2026*; 6:00 p.m. | | at Norfolk State | | | | | | Echols Hall; Norfolk, VA |
| December 20, 2026*; 12:15 p.m., BallerTV | | vs. Temple; West Palm Beach Classic | | | | | | Rubin Arena; West Palm Beach, FL |
| December 21, 2026*; 12:15 p.m., BallerTV | | vs. South Dakota State; West Palm Beach Classic | | | | | | Rubin Arena; West Palm Beach, FL |
| December 27, 2026*; 2:00 p.m., SECN+/ESPN+ | | Mississippi Valley State | | | | | | SJB Pavilion; Oxford, MS |
SEC regular season
| December 31, 2026; 7:00 p.m., ESPN2 | | Oklahoma | | | | | | SJB Pavilion; Oxford, MS |
| January 3, 2027; 4:00 p.m., ESPN | | at Tennessee | | | | | | Thompson–Boling Arena; Knoxville, TN |
| January 7, 2027; 6:30 p.m., SECN+/ESPN+ | | at Arkansas | | | | | | Bud Walton Arena; Fayetteville, AR |
| January 11, 2027; 6:00 p.m., SECN | | Alabama | | | | | | SJB Pavilion; Oxford, MS |
| January 14, 2027; 6:00 p.m., SECN+/ESPN+ | | Missouri | | | | | | SJB Pavilion; Oxford, MS |
| January 21, 2027; 6:00 p.m., SECN | | at Auburn | | | | | | Neville Arena; Auburn, AL |
| January 24, 2027; 2:00 p.m., SECN | | Florida | | | | | | SJB Pavilion; Oxford, MS |
| January 28, 2027; 7:00 p.m., SECN+/ESPN+ | | at Texas A&M | | | | | | Reed Arena; College Station, TX |
| February 1, 2027; 7:00 p.m., ESPN2 | | at LSU | | | | | | Pete Maravich Assembly Center; Baton Rouge, LA |
| February 4, 2027; 8:00 p.m., SECN | | Georgia | | | | | | SJB Pavilion; Oxford, MS |
| February 7, 2027; 3:00 p.m., SECN | | at Mississippi State | | | | | | Humphrey Coliseum; Starkville, MS |
| February 11, 2027; 6:00 p.m., SECN+/ESPN+ | | Kentucky | | | | | | SJB Pavilion; Oxford, MS |
| February 14, 2027; 12:00 p.m., ESPNU | | South Carolina | | | | | | SJB Pavilion; Oxford, MS |
| February 21, 2027; 11:00 a.m., ESPN | | at Vanderbilt | | | | | | Memorial Gymnasium; Nashville, TN |
| February 25, 2027; 8:00 p.m., SECN | | at Alabama | | | | | | Coleman Coliseum; Tuscaloosa, AL |
| February 28, 2027; 1:00 p.m., ESPN/ESPN2 | | Texas | | | | | | SJB Pavilion; Oxford, MS |
SEC tournament
| March 3–7, 2027; TBA | | vs. | | | | | | Bon Secours Wellness Arena; Greenville, SC |
*Non-conference game. ^{#}Rankings from AP Poll. (#) Tournament seedings in parentheses. All times are in Central.

== Rankings ==
Ranking movements Legend: ██ Increase in ranking ██ Decrease in ranking т = Tied with team above or below
| | Week | | | | | | | | | | | | | | | | | | | | |
| Poll | Pre | 1 | 2 | 3 | 4 | 5 | 6 | 7 | 8 | 9 | 10 | 11 | 12 | 13 | 14 | 15 | 16 | 17 | 18 | 19 | Final |
|---|---|---|---|---|---|---|---|---|---|---|---|---|---|---|---|---|---|---|---|---|---|
| AP | 19 | 21 | 19т | | | | | | | | | | | | | | | | | | |
| Coaches | 23 | 24 | 22 | | | | | | | | | | | | | | | | | | |
