= 2026–27 Mississippi State Bulldogs women's basketball team =

Intercollegiate basketball season

2026–27 Mississippi State Bulldogs women's basketball
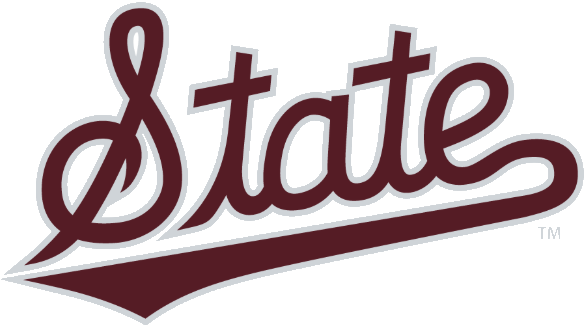
- Conference: Southeastern Conference
- Record: 4–0 (0–0 SEC)
- Head coach: Sam Purcell (5th season)
- Associate head coach: Fred Castro
- Assistant coaches: Anita Howard; Samantha Williams; Tony Dukes
- Home arena: Humphrey Coliseum

2026–27 SEC women's basketball standings
| | Conf. | | | | Overall |
| Team | W | | L | PCT | W | | L | PCT |
|---|---|---|---|---|---|---|---|---|
| Arkansas | 0 | – | 0 | – | 5 | – | 0 | 1.000 |
| Georgia | 0 | – | 0 | – | 5 | – | 0 | 1.000 |
| No. 12 Kentucky | 0 | – | 0 | – | 5 | – | 0 | 1.000 |
| No. 9 LSU | 0 | – | 0 | – | 5 | – | 0 | 1.000 |
| Missouri | 0 | – | 0 | – | 5 | – | 0 | 1.000 |
| Mississippi State | 0 | – | 0 | – | 4 | – | 0 | 1.000 |
| No. 14 Oklahoma | 0 | – | 0 | – | 4 | – | 0 | 1.000 |
| No. 19т Ole Miss | 0 | – | 0 | – | 4 | – | 0 | 1.000 |
| No. 1 South Carolina | 0 | – | 0 | – | 4 | – | 0 | 1.000 |
| Tennessee | 0 | – | 0 | – | 4 | – | 0 | 1.000 |
| No. 6 Texas | 0 | – | 0 | – | 4 | – | 0 | 1.000 |
| Texas A&M | 0 | – | 0 | – | 4 | – | 0 | 1.000 |
| Alabama | 0 | – | 0 | – | 5 | – | 1 | .833 |
| No. 11 Vanderbilt | 0 | – | 0 | – | 4 | – | 1 | .800 |
| Auburn | 0 | – | 0 | – | 3 | – | 1 | .750 |
| Florida | 0 | – | 0 | – | 3 | – | 2 | .600 |
† 2027 SEC tournament winner As of November 17, 2026; Rankings from AP poll

The 2026–27 Mississippi State Bulldogs women's basketball team will represent Mississippi State University during the 2026–27 NCAA Division I women's basketball season. The Bulldogs, led by fifth-year head coach Sam Purcell, will play their home games at the Humphrey Coliseum in Starkville, Mississippi and compete as a member of the Southeastern Conference (SEC).

== Previous season ==
The Bulldogs finished the 2025–26 season 18–13 overall, their poorest since the 2006–07 season, and 5–11 in SEC play, to finish in a tie for twelfth place in the conference alongside Florida. As the No. 13 seed in the SEC tournament, they lost in the first round to No. 12 Florida. They did not qualify for the NCAA tournament, the WBIT or the WNIT.

== Offseason ==
=== Departures ===
Mississippi State departures
| Name | Num | Pos. | Height | Year | Hometown | Reason for departure |
|---|---|---|---|---|---|---|
| Saniyah King | 1 | Guard | 5'7" | Sophomore | Washington, D.C. | Transferred to Seton Hall |
| Destiny McPhaul | 2 | Guard | 5'9" | (redshirt) Senior | Philadelphia, Pennsylvania | Graduated |
| Trayanna Crisp | 4 | Guard | 5'8" | Senior | Goodyear, Arizona | Graduated |
| Chandler Prater | 5 | Guard/Forward | 5'10" | Graduate student | Kansas City, Missouri | Graduated |
| Awa Fane | 8 | Guard | 5'8" | Junior | Thiès, Senegal | Transferred to Stony Brook |
| Jaylah Lampley | 10 | Guard | 6'1" | Freshman | Fishers, Indiana | Transferred to Rutgers |
| Rocío Jiménez | 13 | Center | 6'7" | (redshirt) Sophomore | Elías Piña, Dominican Republic | Transferred to Jacksonville State |
| Nataliyah Gray | 22 | Forward | 6'3" | Freshman | Houston, Texas | Transferred to Tulane |
| Faith Wylder | 23 | Center | 6'6" | Sophomore | New York City, NY | Transferred to Georgia |
| Kharyssa Richardson | 33 | Forward | 6'2" | Senior | Douglasville, Georgia | Graduated |

=== Incoming transfers ===
Mississippi State incoming transfers
| Name | Num | Pos. | Height | Year | Hometown | Previous school |
|---|---|---|---|---|---|---|
| Aryss Macktoon | 0 | Guard | 5'11" | Senior | Baltimore, Maryland | La Salle |
| Reese Beaty | 1 | Guard | 5'9" | Sophomore | Jamestown, Tennessee | Iowa State |
| Tootie Lockett | 2 | Guard | 5'9" | Junior | Starkville, Mississippi | Itawamba CC (NJCAA) |
| Macie Phifer | 14 | Guard/Forward | 6'1" | Sophomore | New Albany, Mississippi | Middle Tennessee |
| Cali Smallwood | 23 | Guard | 5'11" | Senior | Susan Moore, Alabama | UAB |
| Arianny Francisco de Oliveira | 34 | Forward | 6'3" | Junior | Rio de Janeiro, Brazil | Gulf Coast State (NJCAA) |

=== Recruiting class ===
College recruiting
| Name | Hometown | School | Height | Weight | Commit date |
|---|---|---|---|---|---|
| Lani Smallwood; G | Albertville, AL | Albertville High School | 5 ft 7 in (1.70 m) | N/A | |
| Lani Smallwood; G | Recruit ratings: Rivals: 247Sports: ESPN: (93) | | | | |
| Andrea Flores; G | Jonesborough, TN | Daniel Boone High School | 5 ft 10 in (1.78 m) | N/A | |
| Andrea Flores; G | Recruit ratings: 247Sports: | | | | |
Overall recruit ranking:
Note: In many cases, Scout, Rivals, 247Sports, On3, and ESPN may conflict in their listings of height and weight.; In these cases, the average was taken. ESPN grades are on a 100-point scale.; Sources: "2026 Player Commits". ESPN. Archived from the original on August 1, 2026.

== Preseason ==
On October 12, 2026, the SEC released its annual preseason media poll and awards. Mississippi State was picked to finish ninth in the conference.

=== Preseason rankings ===
SEC Preseason Poll
| Place | Team |
|---|---|
| 1 | South Carolina |
| 2 | Texas |
| 3 | LSU |
| 4 | Vanderbilt |
| 5 | Kentucky |
| 6 | Oklahoma |
| 7 | Ole Miss |
| 8 | Tennessee |
| 9 | Mississippi State |
| 10 | Alabama |
| 11 | Texas A&M |
| 12 | Florida |
| 13 | Georgia |
| 14 | Missouri |
| 15 | Auburn |
| 16 | Arkansas |

=== Preseason All-SEC Teams ===
No players were named to the All-SEC First or Second Team.

== Roster ==
Years are listed according to the new NCAA age-based eligibility model.

2026–27 Mississippi State Bulldogs women's basketball team
Players
Coaches

| Pos. | # | Name | Height | Year | Previous school | Hometown |
|---|---|---|---|---|---|---|
| G | 0 | Aryss Macktoon | 5 ft 11 in (1.8 m) | Sr | St. Timothy's School; La Salle | Baltimore, MD |
| F | 00 | Ludovica Sammartino | 6 ft 2 in (1.88 m) | Jr | Istituto San Francesco | Sicily, Italy |
| G | 1 | Reese Beaty | 5 ft 9 in (1.75 m) | So | Alvin C. York Institute; Iowa State | Jamestown, TN |
| G | 2 | Tootie Lockett | 5 ft 9 in (1.75 m) | Jr | Starkville High School; Itawamba Community College | Starkville, MS |
| G | 12 | Lani Smallwood | 5 ft 8 in (1.73 m) | Fr | Albertville High School | Albertville, AL |
| G/F | 14 | Macie Phifer | 6 ft 1 in (1.85 m) | So | Ingomar Attendance Center; Middle Tennessee | New Albany, MS |
| G | 20 | Andrea Flores | 5 ft 11 in (1.8 m) | Fr | Daniel Boone High School | Jonesborough, TN |
| G | 23 | Cali Smallwood | 5 ft 11 in (1.8 m) | Sr | Susan Moore High School; UAB | Susan Moore, AL |
| F | 25 | Favour Nwaedozi | 6 ft 3 in (1.91 m) | Jr | Hakuho Girls' High School; Mukogawa | Delta, Nigeria |
| F | 27 | Grace Ndubueze | 6 ft 4 in (1.93 m) | Fr | | Imo State, Nigeria |
| F | 34 | Arianny Francisco de Oliveira | 6 ft 3 in (1.91 m) | Jr | Gulf Coast State College | Rio de Janeiro, Brazil |
| F | 40 | Madison Francis | 6 ft 2 in (1.88 m) | So | Lancaster Central High School | Lancaster, NY |
| G | 85 | Melissa Guillet | 6 ft 1 in (1.85 m) | So | Lycee Marcelin Berthelot | La Roche-sur-Yon, France |

Head coach

- Sam Purcell (Auburn)

Assistant coach(es)

- Fred Castro (Oklahoma)
- Anita Howard (Armstrong State)
- Samantha Williams (Auburn)
- Tony Dukes (Clayton State)

Legend

- (C) Team captain
- (S) Suspended
- (I) Ineligible
- (W) Walk-on
- Injured
- Current redshirt

Roster
Last update: August 1, 2026

== Schedule and results ==
| Date time, TV | Rank^{#} | Opponent^{#} | Result | Record | High points | High rebounds | High assists | Site (attendance) city, state |
Exhibition
| October 18, 2026*; 4:00 p.m. | | vs. Louisiana Tech | W 80–65 | | – | – | – | Tushka Arena; Choctaw, MS |
Non-conference regular season
| November 3, 2026*; 6:30 p.m., SECN+/ESPN+ | | North Alabama | W 68–27 | 1–0 | 14 – Nwaedozi | 11 – Nwaedozi | 5 – Beaty | Humphrey Coliseum (4,095); Starkville, MS |
| November 8, 2026*; 2:00 p.m., ESPN+ | | at UT Martin | W 114–68 | 2–0 | 21 – Nwaedozi | 14 – Nwaedozi | 10 – Beaty | Skyhawk Arena (1,371); Martin, TN |
| November 11, 2026*; 6:30 p.m., SECN+/ESPN+ | | Troy | W 79–57 | 3–0 | 22 – Nwaedozi | 19 – Nwaedozi | 5 – Beaty | Humphrey Coliseum (3,874); Starkville, MS |
| November 14, 2026*; 11:00 a.m., ESPN+ | | at Buffalo | W 90–57 | 4–0 | 22 – Francis | 10 – Phifer | 7 – Beaty | Broadview Arena (2,264); Amherst, NY |
| November 17, 2026*; 11:00 a.m., SECN+/ESPN+ | | Alabama State | | | | | | Humphrey Coliseum; Starkville, MS |
| November 22, 2026*; 2:00 p.m., ESPN+ | | at Southern Miss | | | | | | Reed Green Coliseum; Hattiesburg, MS |
| November 27, 2026*; 10:00 a.m., Ion | | vs. Indiana; Fort Myers Tip-Off Shell Division | | | | | | Suncoast Credit Union Arena; Fort Myers, FL |
| November 28, 2026*; 10:00 a.m., Ion | | vs. TCU; Fort Myers Tip-Off Shell Division | | | | | | Suncoast Credit Union Arena; Fort Myers, FL |
| December 3, 2026*; 8:00 p.m., ESPNU | | Virginia; ACC–SEC Challenge | | | | | | Humphrey Coliseum; Starkville, MS |
| December 6, 2026*; 5:00 p.m., SECN | | Sam Houston | | | | | | Humphrey Coliseum; Starkville, MS |
| December 13, 2026*; 2:00 p.m., SECN+/ESPN+ | | Texas Tech | | | | | | Humphrey Coliseum; Starkville, MS |
| December 16, 2026*; 6:30 p.m., SECN+/ESPN+ | | Samford | | | | | | Humphrey Coliseum; Starkville, MS |
| December 20, 2026*; 12:00 p.m., ESPN+ | | at Davidson | | | | | | John M. Belk Arena; Davidson, NC |
| December 28, 2026*; 3:00 p.m., SECN+/ESPN+ | | Jackson State | | | | | | Humphrey Coliseum; Starkville, MS |
SEC regular season
| December 31, 2026; TBA, SECN+/ESPN+ | | at Missouri | | | | | | Mizzou Arena; Columbia, MO |
| January 3, 2027; 2:00 p.m., SECN+/ESPN+ | | Texas A&M | | | | | | Humphrey Coliseum; Starkville, MS |
| January 7, 2027; 6:00 p.m., SECN | | South Carolina | | | | | | Humphrey Coliseum; Starkville, MS |
| January 10, 2027; 5:00 p.m., SECN | | at Vanderbilt | | | | | | Memorial Gymnasium; Nashville, TN |
| January 14, 2027; 7:00 p.m., SECN+/ESPN+ | | at LSU | | | | | | Pete Maravich Assembly Center; Baton Rouge, LA |
| January 21, 2027; 6:30 p.m., SECN+/ESPN+ | | Oklahoma | | | | | | Humphrey Coliseum; Starkville, MS |
| January 24, 2027; 4:00 p.m., SECN | | Texas | | | | | | Humphrey Coliseum; Starkville, MS |
| January 28, 2027; 6:30 p.m., SECN+/ESPN+ | | at Arkansas | | | | | | Bud Walton Arena; Fayetteville, AR |
| January 31, 2027; 11:00 a.m., SECN | | at Georgia | | | | | | Stegeman Coliseum; Athens, GA |
| February 4, 2027; 6:30 p.m., SECN+/ESPN+ | | Tennessee | | | | | | Humphrey Coliseum; Starkville, MS |
| February 7, 2027; 3:00 p.m., SECN | | Ole Miss | | | | | | Humphrey Coliseum; Starkville, MS |
| February 11, 2027; 5:00 p.m., SECN+/ESPN+ | | at Florida | | | | | | O'Connell Center; Gainesville, FL |
| February 15, 2027; 7:00 p.m., SECN | | at Auburn | | | | | | Neville Arena; Auburn, AL |
| February 21, 2027; 2:00 p.m., SECN+/ESPN+ | | Alabama | | | | | | Humphrey Coliseum; Starkville, MS |
| February 25, 2027; 6:30 p.m., SECN+/ESPN+ | | Arkansas | | | | | | Humphrey Coliseum; Starkville, MS |
| February 28, 2027; 1:00 p.m., SECN | | at Kentucky | | | | | | Memorial Coliseum; Lexington, KY |
SEC tournament
| March 3–7, 2027; TBA | | vs. | | | | | | Bon Secours Wellness Arena; Greenville, SC |
*Non-conference game. ^{#}Rankings from AP Poll. (#) Tournament seedings in parentheses. All times are in Central.
