= 2026–27 Tennessee Lady Volunteers basketball team =

American college basketball season

2026–27 Tennessee Lady Volunteers basketball
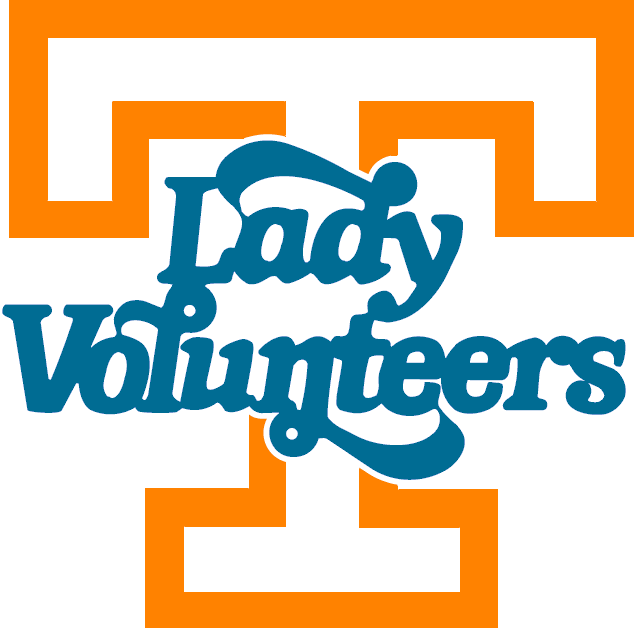
- Conference: Southeastern Conference
- Record: 6–0 (0–0 SEC)
- Head coach: Kim Caldwell (3rd season)
- Assistant coaches: Bill Ferrera; Isoken Uzamere; Jenna Burdette; Angel Rizor; Lexie Barrier
- Home arena: Thompson-Boling Arena

2026–27 SEC women's basketball standings
	Conf.				Overall
Team	W		L	PCT	W		L	PCT
Arkansas	0	–	0	–	5	–	0	1.000
No. 12 Kentucky	0	–	0	–	5	–	0	1.000
No. 9 LSU	0	–	0	–	5	–	0	1.000
Mississippi State	0	–	0	–	5	–	0	1.000
Missouri	0	–	0	–	5	–	0	1.000
No. 14 Oklahoma	0	–	0	–	5	–	0	1.000
No. 1 South Carolina	0	–	0	–	5	–	0	1.000
Tennessee	0	–	0	–	5	–	0	1.000
No. 6 Texas	0	–	0	–	5	–	0	1.000
Texas A&M	0	–	0	–	5	–	0	1.000
Alabama	0	–	0	–	5	–	1	.833
Georgia	0	–	0	–	5	–	1	.833
No. 11 Vanderbilt	0	–	0	–	5	–	1	.833
Auburn	0	–	0	–	4	–	1	.800
No. 19т Ole Miss	0	–	0	–	4	–	1	.800
Florida	0	–	0	–	3	–	2	.600
† 2027 SEC tournament winner As of November 20, 2026; Rankings from AP poll

The 2026–27 Tennessee Lady Volunteers basketball team currently represents the University of Tennessee in the 2026–27 NCAA Division I women's basketball season. The Lady Volunteers, led by third-year head coach Kim Caldwell, play their games at the Thompson–Boling Arena in Knoxville, Tennessee, and compete as a member of the Southeastern Conference (SEC).

== Previous season ==
The Lady Volunteers finished the 2025–26 season a program-worst at 16–14 overall and 8–8 in SEC play, to finish in a tie for fourth in the conference with Kentucky, Georgia and Ole Miss. As the No. 6 seed in the SEC tournament, they were upset in the second round by No. 11 Alabama 64–76.

Following the tournament loss, the Lady Vols earned an at-large bid to the NCAA tournament, where they were seeded No. 10 in the Fort Worth #3 Regional, making it their second lowest seed ever in the tournament behind the No. 11 seed 2019–20 team. They were eliminated in the first round by No. 7 seed NC State 61–76 to end their season, the last of an eight-game losing streak.

On November 2, 2025, prior to the start of the season, senior guard Ruby Whitehorn was dismissed from the program due to a second misdemeanor drug charge. She was previously suspended for a misdemeanor aggravated trespassing and burglary charge. She later transferred to Arizona State.

Following the conclusion of the season, the Lady Vols saw a major mass exodus of their roster, with no players returning for the 2026–27 season. All eight remaining scholarship players entered the transfer portal, alongside four graduates and a de-commit from No. 2 ranked 2026 recruit Oliviyah Edwards in April.

== Offseason ==
=== Departures ===
Tennessee departures
Name	Num	Pos.	Height	Year	Hometown	Reason for departure
Janiah Barker	0	Forward	6'4"	Senior	Marietta, GA	Graduated; drafted 29th overall by the Las Vegas Aces in the 2026 WNBA draft
Ruby Whitehorn	2	Guard	6'0"	Senior	Detroit, MI	Dismissed from program, transferred to Arizona State
Kaniya Boyd	4	Guard	5'9"	(redshirt) Sophomore	Las Vegas, NV	Transferred to Texas A&M
Kaiya Wynn	5	Guard	6'0"	(redshirt) Senior	Nashville, TN	Graduated
Lauren Hurst	7	Guard-forward	6'3"	Freshman	Cleveland, TN	Transferred to Virginia Tech
Jersey Wolfenbarger	8	Forward	6'5"	Senior	Fort Smith, AR	Graduated
Zee Spearman	11	Forward	6'4"	Senior	Dacula, GA	Graduated; drafted 31st overall by the Dallas Wings in the 2026 WNBA draft
Mya Pauldo	12	Guard	5'6"	Freshman	Paterson, NJ	Transferred to Rutgers
Mia Pauldo	13	Guard	5'6"	Freshman	Paterson, NJ	Transferred to Rutgers
Jaida Civil	15	Guard	6'0"	Freshman	Vero Beach, FL	Transferred to Ole Miss
Deniya Prawl	25	Guard	6'2"	Freshman	Toronto, ON	Transferred to Louisville
Alyssa Latham	33	Forward	6'2"	Junior	Glenwood, IL	Transferred to Virginia Tech
Talaysia Cooper	55	Guard	6'0"	(redshirt) Junior	Turbeville, SC	Transferred to Ole Miss

=== Incoming transfers ===
Tennessee incoming transfers
Name	Num	Pos.	Height	Year	Hometown	Previous school
Kaylene Smikle	0	Guard	6'0"	5th year	Bay Shore, NY	Maryland
Avery Mills	1	Guard	5'9"	Junior	Lynchburg, VA	Liberty
Harissoum Coulibaly	2	Guard	5'10"	Sophomore	Paris, France	Auburn
Zhen Craft	8	Forward	6'2"	Sophomore	Waldorf, MD	Georgia
Shaelyn Steele	9	Guard	5'6"	Junior	Ashland, KY	Penn State
Jada Eads	10	Guard	5'7"	Junior	Orlando, FL	Seton Hall
Rylie Theuerkauf	14	Guard	5'9"	Senior	Tenafly, NJ	Georgia
Harper Peterson	15	Forward	6'3"	Junior	Rocklin, CA	Stanford
Riley Makalusky	21	Forward	6'2"	Senior	Fishers, IN	West Virginia
Naomi White	25	Guard	5'9"	Junior	Omaha, NE	Northern Arizona
Aaliyah Moore	31	Forward	6'1"	6th year	Moore, OK	Texas
Kennedy Fauntleroy	35	Guard	5'7"	5th year	Upper Marlboro, MD	East Carolina
Fatmata Janneh	44	Forward	6'2"	Senior	London, England	Texas A&M

=== Recruiting class ===
College recruiting
Name	Hometown	School	Height	Weight	Commit date
Gabby Minus; G-F	Dacula, GA	Hebron Christian Academy	6 ft 1 in (1.85 m)	N/A	
Gabby Minus; G-F	Recruit ratings: Rivals: 247Sports: ESPN: (93)				
Overall recruit ranking:
Note: In many cases, Scout, Rivals, 247Sports, On3, and ESPN may conflict in their listings of height and weight.; In these cases, the average was taken. ESPN grades are on a 100-point scale.; Sources: "2026 Player Commits". ESPN. Archived from the original on July 24, 2026.

== Preseason ==
On October 12, 2026, the SEC released its annual preseason media poll and awards. Tennessee was picked to finish eighth in the conference.

=== Preseason rankings ===
SEC Preseason Poll
Place	Team
1	South Carolina
2	Texas
3	LSU
4	Vanderbilt
5	Kentucky
6	Oklahoma
7	Ole Miss
8	Tennessee
9	Mississippi State
10	Alabama
11	Texas A&M
12	Florida
13	Georgia
14	Missouri
15	Auburn
16	Arkansas

=== Preseason All-SEC Teams ===
No players were named to the All-SEC First or Second Team.

== Roster ==
Years are listed according to the new NCAA age-based eligibility model.

2026–27 Tennessee Lady Volunteers women's basketball team
Players
Coaches

Pos.	#	Name	Height	Year	Previous school	Hometown
G	0	Kaylene Smikle (5th)	6 ft 0 in (1.83 m)	Sr	Maryland	Bay Shore, NY
G	1	Avery Mills (injured)	5 ft 9 in (1.75 m)	Jr	Liberty	Lynchburg, VA
G	2	Harissoum Coulibaly	5 ft 10 in (1.78 m)	So	Auburn	Paris, France
G/F	4	Gabby Minus	6 ft 1 in (1.85 m)	Fr	Hebron Christian Academy	Dacula, GA
F	8	Zhen Craft	6 ft 2 in (1.88 m)	So	Georgia	Waldorf, MD
G	9	Shaelyn Steele	5 ft 6 in (1.68 m)	Jr	Penn State	Ashland, KY
G	10	Jada Eads	5 ft 7 in (1.7 m)	Jr	Seton Hall	Orlando, FL
G	11	Irene Oboavwodou	5 ft 10 in (1.78 m)	Fr	Trinity CE HS	London, England
G	12	Nya Robertson (5th)	5 ft 7 in (1.7 m)	GS	SMU	Fort Worth, TX
G	14	Rylie Theuerkauf	5 ft 9 in (1.75 m)	Sr	Georgia	Tenafly, NJ
F	15	Harper Peterson	6 ft 3 in (1.91 m)	Jr	Stanford	Rocklin, CA
F	21	Riley Makalusky	6 ft 2 in (1.88 m)	Sr	West Virginia	Fishers, IN
G	25	Naomi White	5 ft 9 in (1.75 m)	Jr	Northern Arizona	Omaha, NE
F	31	Aaliyah Moore (6th)	6 ft 1 in (1.85 m)	Sr	Texas	Moore, OK
G	35	Kennedy Fauntleroy (5th)	5 ft 7 in (1.7 m)	Sr	East Carolina	Upper Marlboro, MD
F	44	Fatmata Janneh	6 ft 2 in (1.88 m)	Sr	Texas A&M	London, England

Head coach

- Kim Caldwell (Glenville State)

Assistant coach(es)

- Bill Ferrara (Florida)
- Isoken Uzamere (Albany)
- Jenna Burdette (Dayton)
- Angel Rizor (Cincinnati)
- Lexie Barrier (James Madison)

Legend

- (C) Team captain
- (S) Suspended
- (I) Ineligible
- (W) Walk-on
- (5th) Fifth-year senior
- (6th) Sixth-year senior
- Injured
- Current redshirt

Roster
Last update: November 4, 2026

On July 23, junior transfer guard Avery Mills announced on Instagram that she had suffered a torn ACL and meniscus in her right knee, and had undergone season-ending surgery. Caldwell had previously said on July 7 that Mills would be sidelined "for an extended period of time."

Former Lady Vols player Nya Robertson rejoined the team on November 4 after receiving a ten-day temporary restraining order through the Wheeler v. NCAA lawsuit, filed in July, which challenges the NCAA’s age-based eligibility model that excluded the class of 2022.

== Schedule and results ==
Date time, TV	Rank^{#}	Opponent^{#}	Result	Record	High points	High rebounds	High assists	Site (attendance) city, state
Exhibition
October 27, 2026*; 6:30 p.m., SECN+/ESPN+		Florida A&M	W 132–63		19 – Smikle	13 – Janneh	7 – White	Thompson–Boling Arena; Knoxville, TN
Non-conference regular season
November 2, 2026*; 6:30 p.m., SECN+		Duquesne	W 109–62	1–0	31 – Smikle	10 – Janneh	6 – Eads	Thompson–Boling Arena (9,662); Knoxville, TN
November 5, 2026*; 7:00 p.m., MEAC Network		at Coppin State	W 99–60	2–0	18 – Smikle	13 – Janneh	7 – Fauntleroy	Physical Education Complex (1,619); Baltimore, MD
November 10, 2026*; 6:30 p.m., SECN+		New Haven	W 83–40	3–0	14 – Moore	9 – Janneh	3 – Eads	Thompson–Boling Arena (10,343); Knoxville, TN
November 12, 2026*; 6:30 p.m., SECN+		Middle Tennessee	W 110–64	4–0	30 – Smikle	6 – Tied	6 – Eads	Thompson–Boling Arena (9,877); Knoxville, TN
November 17, 2026*; 7:30 p.m., ESPN+		at Belmont	W 85–67	5–0	25 – White	8 – Craft	9 – Fauntleroy	Curb Event Center (2,861); Nashville, TN
November 19, 2026*; 7:00 p.m., SECN		Radford	W 102–48	6–0	18 – Smikle	6 – Eads	5 – Eads	Thompson–Boling Arena; Knoxville, TN
November 22, 2026*; 5:30 p.m., ESPN		No. 10 UCLA						Thompson–Boling Arena; Knoxville, TN
November 27, 2026*; 6:30 p.m., BDG Live		at Florida Gulf Coast; Coconut Hoops Great Egret Division semifinals						Alico Arena; Fort Myers, FL
November 29, 2026*; 4:00/6:30 p.m., BDG Live		vs. Houston/Creighton; Coconut Hoops Great Egret Division						Alico Arena; Fort Myers, FL
December 3, 2026*; 9:00 p.m., ESPN2		at Virginia Tech; ACC–SEC Challenge						Cassell Coliseum; Blacksburg, VA
December 6, 2026*; 2:00 p.m., SECN+		Georgia State						Thompson–Boling Arena; Knoxville, TN
December 8, 2026*; 7:00 p.m., SECN		North Carolina Central						Thompson–Boling Arena; Knoxville, TN
December 12, 2026*; 2:30 p.m., FOX		at UConn; Rivalry						PeoplesBank Arena; Hartford, CT
December 15, 2026*; 7:00 p.m., SECN		Alabama A&M						Thompson–Boling Arena; Knoxville, TN
December 18, 2026*; 6:00 p.m., ESPN2		vs. Baylor; Bad Boy Mower Series – Nashville						Bridgestone Arena; Nashville, TN
December 21, 2026*; 2:00 p.m., SECN+		Morehead State						Thompson–Boling Arena; Knoxville, TN
SEC regular season
December 31, 2026; 3:00 p.m., SECN+		at Texas A&M						Reed Arena; College Station, TX
January 3, 2027; 5:00 p.m., ESPN		Ole Miss						Thompson–Boling Arena; Knoxville, TN
January 7, 2027; 5:00 p.m., ESPN2		at Texas						Moody Center; Austin, TX
January 10, 2027; 5:00 p.m., ESPN		Oklahoma						Thompson–Boling Arena; Knoxville, TN
January 14, 2027; 6:30 p.m., SECN+		Georgia						Thompson–Boling Arena; Knoxville, TN
January 18, 2027; 7:00 p.m., SECN		at Florida						O'Connell Center; Gainesville, FL
January 21, 2027; 8:00 p.m., ESPNU		at Kentucky; Rivalry						Memorial Coliseum; Lexington, KY
January 24, 2027; 1:00 p.m., SECN		Alabama						Thompson–Boling Arena; Knoxville, TN
January 28, 2027; 6:30 p.m., SECN		South Carolina						Thompson–Boling Arena; Knoxville, TN
February 4, 2027; 6:30 p.m., SECN+		at Mississippi State						Humphrey Coliseum; Starkville, MS
February 7, 2027; TBA, ESPN		at Vanderbilt; Rivalry						Memorial Gymnasium; Nashville, TN
February 11, 2027; 6:30 p.m., SECN+		Auburn						Thompson–Boling Arena; Knoxville, TN
February 14, 2027; 2:00 p.m., SECN		at Missouri						Mizzou Arena; Columbia, MO
February 21, 2027; 1:00 p.m., SECN		Kentucky; Rivalry						Thompson–Boling Arena; Knoxville, TN
February 25, 2027; 6:00 p.m., ESPN		LSU						Thompson–Boling Arena; Knoxville, TN
February 28, 2027; 3:00 p.m., SECN+		at Arkansas						Bud Walton Arena; Fayetteville, AR
SEC tournament
March 3–7, 2027; TBA		vs.						Bon Secours Wellness Arena; Greenville, SC
*Non-conference game. ^{#}Rankings from AP Poll. (#) Tournament seedings in parentheses. All times are in Eastern.

== Rankings ==
Ranking movements Legend: RV = Received votes
	Week																				
Poll	Pre	1	2	3	4	5	6	7	8	9	10	11	12	13	14	15	16	17	18	19	Final
AP	RV																				
Coaches	RV																				
