= 2026–27 Auburn Tigers women's basketball team =

American collegiate basketball season

2026–27 Auburn Tigers women's basketball
- Conference: Southeastern Conference
- Record: 3–1 (0–0 SEC)
- Head coach: Larry Vickers (2nd season)
- Assistant coaches: Candice M. Jackson; Tamoria Holmes; Taja Cole; DeQuann Gordon
- Home arena: Neville Arena

2026–27 SEC women's basketball standings
	Conf.				Overall
Team	W		L	PCT	W		L	PCT
Arkansas	0	–	0	–	4	–	0	1.000
Georgia	0	–	0	–	4	–	0	1.000
No. 12 Kentucky	0	–	0	–	4	–	0	1.000
No. 9 LSU	0	–	0	–	4	–	0	1.000
Missouri	0	–	0	–	4	–	0	1.000
No. 14 Oklahoma	0	–	0	–	4	–	0	1.000
Tennessee	0	–	0	–	4	–	0	1.000
No. 8 Vanderbilt	0	–	0	–	4	–	0	1.000
Mississippi State	0	–	0	–	3	–	0	1.000
No. 21 Ole Miss	0	–	0	–	3	–	0	1.000
No. 1 South Carolina	0	–	0	–	3	–	0	1.000
No. 6 Texas	0	–	0	–	3	–	0	1.000
Texas A&M	0	–	0	–	3	–	0	1.000
Alabama	0	–	0	–	4	–	1	.800
Auburn	0	–	0	–	3	–	1	.750
Florida	0	–	0	–	3	–	1	.750
† 2027 SEC tournament winner As of November 14, 2026; Rankings from AP poll

The 2026–27 Auburn Tigers women's basketball team currently represents Auburn University during the 2026–27 NCAA Division I women's basketball season. The Tigers, led by second-year head coach Larry Vickers, play their home games at the Neville Arena in Auburn, Alabama as a member of the Southeastern Conference (SEC).

== Previous season ==
The Tigers finished the 2025–26 season 15–17 overall and 3–13 in SEC play, to finish fifteenth in the conference. As a No. 15 seed in the SEC Tournament, they upset No. 10 Texas A&M in the first round in a 50–49 win, before losing in the second round to No. 7 Ole Miss.

== Offseason ==
=== Departures ===
Auburn departures
Name	Number	Pos.	Height	Year	Hometown	Reason for departure
Angena Belloso	0	Guard	5'11"	Senior	Montgat, Spain	Graduated
Mya Petticord	1	Guard	5'9"	Senior	Detroit, MI	Graduated
Harissoum Coulibaly	3	Guard	5'10"	Freshman	Paris, France	Transferred to Tennessee
Khady Leye	6	Forward	6'2"	Sophomore	Louga, Senegal	Transferred to NC State
A'riel Jackson	7	Guard	5'9"	Senior	Brooklyn, NY	Graduated
Arek Angui	23	Center	6'9"	(redshirt) Freshman	Juba, South Sudan	Transferred to Nebraska
Clara Koulibaly	30	Forward	6'3"	Junior	Montreal, QC	Transferred to Wichita State

=== Incoming transfers ===
Auburn incoming transfers
Name	Number	Pos.	Height	Year	Hometown	Previous school
Sira Thienou	0	Forward	6'1"	Junior	Bamako, Mali	Ole Miss
Phoenix Stotijn	3	Guard	5'9"	Junior	Amsterdam, Netherlands	Indiana
Danielle Osho	7	Forward	6'1"	Sophomore	Dacula, GA	Miami (FL)
Zahara Bishop	8	Guard	6'0"	Sophomore	Minneapolis, MN	Seton Hall
Jessica Peterson	9	Center	6'2"	Graduate student	Rancho Cucamonga, CA	Miami (FL)
Savannah Scott	30	Center	6'4"	(redshirt) Junior	Conway, AR	UCF

=== Recruiting class ===
College recruiting
Name	Hometown	School	Height	Weight	Commit date
Ashley Knox; W	Tampa, FL	Tampa Catholic	6 ft 0 in (1.83 m)	N/A	Nov 13, 2025
Ashley Knox; W	Recruit ratings: Rivals: 247Sports: ESPN: (93)				
Zaniyah Williams; PG	Suffolk, VA	Montverde Academy	5 ft 8 in (1.73 m)	N/A	Nov 13, 2025
Zaniyah Williams; PG	Recruit ratings: Rivals: 247Sports: ESPN: (93)				
Overall recruit ranking:
Note: In many cases, Scout, Rivals, 247Sports, On3, and ESPN may conflict in their listings of height and weight.; In these cases, the average was taken. ESPN grades are on a 100-point scale.; Sources: "2026 Player Commits". ESPN. Archived from the original on July 30, 2026.

== Preseason ==
On October 12, 2026, the SEC released its annual preseason media poll and awards. Auburn was picked to finish fifteenth in the conference.

=== Preseason rankings ===
SEC Preseason Poll
Place	Team
1	South Carolina
2	Texas
3	LSU
4	Vanderbilt
5	Kentucky
6	Oklahoma
7	Ole Miss
8	Tennessee
9	Mississippi State
10	Alabama
11	Texas A&M
12	Florida
13	Georgia
14	Missouri
15	Auburn
16	Arkansas

=== Preseason All-SEC Teams ===
No players were named to the All-SEC First or Second Team.

== Roster ==
2026–27 Auburn Tigers women's basketball team
Players
Coaches

Pos.	#	Name	Height	Year	Previous school	Hometown
F	0	Sira Thienou	6 ft 1 in (1.85 m)	Jr	Shining Stars Sports Academy; Ole Miss	Bamako, Mali
G	1	Zaniyah Williams	5 ft 8 in (1.73 m)	Fr	Montverde Academy	Norfolk, VA
G	2	Ja'Mia Harris	5 ft 11 in (1.8 m)	RS Sr	DeSoto High School; Texas State	Lancaster, TX
G	3	Phoenix Stotijn	5 ft 9 in (1.75 m)	Jr	BC Triple Threat; Indiana	Amsterdam, Netherlands
G	4	Kaitlyn Duhon	5 ft 10 in (1.78 m)	RS Sr	Summer Creek High School	Houston, TX
G	5	Ashley Knox	6 ft 0 in (1.83 m)	Fr	Tampa Catholic High School	Tampa, FL
G	6	Eva Garabadian (W)	5 ft 8 in (1.73 m)	Jr	Wesleyan School; Georgia College	Alpharetta, GA
F	7	Danielle Osho	6 ft 1 in (1.85 m)	So	Hebron Christian Academy; Miami (FL)	Dacula, GA
G	8	Zahara Bishop	6 ft 0 in (1.83 m)	So	Benilde-St. Margaret's; Seton Hall	Minneapolis, MN
F	9	Jessica Peterson	6 ft 2 in (1.88 m)	GS	Etiwanda High School; Miami (FL)	Rancho Cucamonga, CA
G	10	Sania Richardson	5 ft 5 in (1.65 m)	So	Ada HS	Ada, OK
G/F	11	Syriah Daniels	6 ft 0 in (1.83 m)	Jr	Auburn High School	Auburn, AL
C	30	Savannah Scott	6 ft 4 in (1.93 m)	RS Jr	Conway High School; UCF	Conway, AR
F	35	Quanirah Montague	6 ft 5 in (1.96 m)	Sr	Atlantic City High School; Mississippi State	Atlantic City, NJ

Head coach

- Larry Vickers (Norfolk State)

Assistant coach(es)

- Candice M. Jackson (Michigan State)
- Tamoria Holmes (Howard)
- Taja Cole (Georgia)
- DeQuann Gordon (Asbury)

Legend

- (C) Team captain
- (S) Suspended
- (I) Ineligible
- (W) Walk-on
- Injured
- Current redshirt

Roster

== Schedule and results ==
Date time, TV	Rank^{#}	Opponent^{#}	Result	Record	High points	High rebounds	High assists	Site (attendance) city, state
Exhibition
October 14, 2026*; 12:00 p.m., YouTube		vs. UCF; Ballin' in Boutwell	W 65–59	–	23 – Harris	6 – Tied	4 – Montague	Boutwell Auditorium (1,781); Birmingham, AL
October 28, 2026*; 6:00 p.m.		Columbus State	W 106–44	–	19 – Duhon	9 – Duhon	6 – Stotijn	Neville Arena (631); Auburn, AL
Non-conference regular season
November 2, 2026*; 6:00 p.m., SECN+/ESPN+		Alabama State	W 84–35	1–0	16 – Ohso	8 – Peterson	5 – Richardson	Neville Arena (2,587); Auburn, AL
November 5, 2026*; 6:00 p.m., SECN+/ESPN+		Southern Miss	W 56–48	2–0	16 – Ohso	19 – Peterson	3 – Richardson	Neville Arena (2,526); Auburn, AL
November 10, 2026*; 11:00 a.m., SECN+/ESPN+		Furman	W 74–56	3–0	20 – Stotijn	8 – Ohso	3 – Williams	Neville Arena (7,113); Auburn, AL
November 13, 2026*; 6:00 p.m., ESPN+		at Texas Tech	L 71–73	3–1	20 – Duhon	6 – Duhon	4 – Osho	United Supermarkets Arena (4,740); Lubbock, TX
November 17, 2026*; 6:00 p.m., SECN+/ESPN+		Seton Hall						Neville Arena; Auburn, AL
November 20, 2026*; 6:00 p.m., SECN+/ESPN+		Middle Tennessee						Neville Arena; Auburn, AL
November 25, 2026*; 1:30 p.m., FloCollege		vs. Wisconsin; Puerto Rico Shootout & Classic						Coliseo Guillermo Angulo; San Juan, PR
November 26, 2026*; 11:00 a.m., FloCollege		vs. Southern; Puerto Rico Shootout & Classic						Coliseo Guillermo Angulo; San Juan, PR
November 27, 2026*; 11:00 a.m., FloCollege		vs. Syracuse; Puerto Rico Shootout & Classic						Coliseo Guillermo Angulo; San Juan, PR
December 3, 2026*; 6:15 p.m., SECN		Stanford; ACC–SEC Challenge						Neville Arena; Auburn, AL
December 6, 2026*; 6:00 p.m., SECN+/ESPN+		Wake Forest						Neville Arena; Auburn, AL
December 17, 2026*; 4:00 p.m., SECN+/ESPN+		Jackson State						Neville Arena; Auburn, AL
December 20, 2026*; 8:00 p.m., WSN		vs. South Florida; Cherokee Invitational						Harrah's Cherokee; Cherokee, NC
December 21, 2026*; 3:00 p.m., WSN		vs. Tulsa; Cherokee Invitational						Harrah's Cherokee; Cherokee, NC
December 28, 2026*; 6:00 p.m., SECN+/ESPN+		South Alabama						Neville Arena; Auburn, AL
SEC regular season
December 31, 2026; 6:30 p.m., SECN+/ESPN+		LSU						Neville Arena; Auburn, AL
January 3, 2027; 11:00 a.m., SECN		at Kentucky						Memorial Coliseum; Lexington, KY
January 7, 2026; 6:00 p.m., SECN+/ESPN+		Vanderbilt						Neville Arena; Auburn, AL
January 10, 2027; 11:00 a.m., SECN		at Georgia						Stegeman Coliseum; Athens, GA
January 14, 2027; 5:00 p.m., SECN+/ESPN+		at Florida						O'Connell Center; Gainesville, FL
January 21, 2027; 6:00 p.m., SECN		Ole Miss						Neville Arena; Auburn, AL
January 24, 2027; 2:00 p.m., SECN+/ESPN+		Texas A&M						Neville Arena; Auburn, AL
January 28, 2027; 7:00 p.m., SECN+/ESPN+		at LSU						Pete Maravich Assembly Center; Baton Rouge, LA
January 31, 2027; 3:00 p.m., SECN		Arkansas						Neville Arena; Auburn, AL
February 4, 2027; 6:00 p.m., SECN		Texas						Neville Arena; Auburn, AL
February 7, 2027; 5:00 p.m., SECN		at Alabama						Coleman Coliseum; Tuscaloosa, AL
February 11, 2027; 5:30 p.m., SECN+/ESPN+		at Tennessee						Thompson–Boling Arena; Knoxville, TN
February 15, 2027; 7:00 p.m., SECN		Mississippi State						Neville Arena; Auburn, AL
February 21, 2027; 2:00 p.m., SECN+/ESPN+		at Oklahoma						Lloyd Noble Center; Norman, OK
February 25, 2027; 6:00 p.m., SECN+/ESPN+		at South Carolina						Colonial Life Arena; Columbia, SC
February 28, 2027; 3:00 p.m., SECN		Missouri						Neville Arena; Auburn, AL
SEC tournament
March 3–7, 2027; TBA		vs.						Bon Secours Wellness Arena; Greenville, SC
*Non-conference game. ^{#}Rankings from AP Poll. (#) Tournament seedings in parentheses. All times are in Central.

== Rankings ==
Ranking movements Legend: — = Not ranked
	Week																				
Poll	Pre	1	2	3	4	5	6	7	8	9	10	11	12	13	14	15	16	17	18	19	Final
AP	—																				
Coaches	—																				

== See also ==
- 2026–27 Auburn Tigers men's basketball team
