= 2026–27 Arkansas Razorbacks women's basketball team =

American collegiate basketball season

2026–27 Arkansas Razorbacks women's basketball
- Conference: Southeastern Conference
- Record: 5–0 (0–0 SEC)
- Head coach: Kelsi Musick (2nd season)
- Assistant coaches: Lacey Goldwire; Nick Bradford; Alex Furr; Dionnah Jackson-Durrett
- Home arena: Bud Walton Arena

2026–27 SEC women's basketball standings
	Conf.				Overall
Team	W		L	PCT	W		L	PCT
No. 12 Kentucky	0	–	0	–	6	–	0	1.000
No. 9 LSU	0	–	0	–	6	–	0	1.000
No. 14 Oklahoma	0	–	0	–	6	–	0	1.000
Tennessee	0	–	0	–	6	–	0	1.000
Arkansas	0	–	0	–	5	–	0	1.000
Mississippi State	0	–	0	–	5	–	0	1.000
Missouri	0	–	0	–	5	–	0	1.000
No. 1 South Carolina	0	–	0	–	5	–	0	1.000
No. 6 Texas	0	–	0	–	5	–	0	1.000
Texas A&M	0	–	0	–	5	–	0	1.000
Alabama	0	–	0	–	6	–	1	.857
Auburn	0	–	0	–	5	–	1	.833
Georgia	0	–	0	–	5	–	1	.833
No. 11 Vanderbilt	0	–	0	–	5	–	1	.833
No. 19т Ole Miss	0	–	0	–	4	–	1	.800
Florida	0	–	0	–	4	–	2	.667
† 2027 SEC tournament winner As of November 21, 2026; Rankings from AP poll

The 2026–27 Arkansas Razorbacks women's basketball team will represent the University of Arkansas during the 2026–27 NCAA Division I women's basketball season. The Razorbacks, led by second-year head coach Kelsi Musick, will play their home games at the Bud Walton Arena in Fayetteville, Arkansas as members of the Southeastern Conference (SEC).

== Previous season ==
The Razorbacks finished the 2025–26 season 12–20 overall and 1–15 SEC play, to finish last in the conference. As the No. 16 seed in the SEC Tournament, they lost in the first round to No. 9 Kentucky.

== Offseason ==
=== Departures ===
Arkansas departures
Name	Number	Pos.	Height	Year	Hometown	Reason for departure
Maria Anis Rodriguez	1	Forward	6'1"	Sophomore	Barcelona, Spain	Transferred to Xavier
Harmonie Ware	3	Guard	5'10"	Freshman	Cleveland, TN	Transferred to Georgia
Cristina Sánchez Cerqueira	7	Forward	6'1"	Junior	Granada, Spain	Transferred to San Jose State
Taleyah Jones	10	Guard	5'10"	Senior	Broken Arrow, OK	Graduated
Wyvette Mayberry	11	Guard	5'7"	Graduate Student	Tulsa, OK	Graduated
Jada Bates	15	Forward	6'3"	Sophomore	Powder Springs, GA	Transferred to North Carolina A&T
Ashlynn Chlarson	21	Center	6'3"	Junior	Pima, AZ	Transferred to Grand Canyon
Bonnie Deas	22	Guard	5'9"	Freshman	Frankston, Australia	Transferred to UCLA
Danika Galea	25	Center	6'3"	Sophomore	St. Paul's Bay, Malta	Transferred to Utah State
Jenna Lawrence	34	Forward	6'3"	Junior	Farmington, AR	Transferred to Clemson
Maryn Archer	44	Guard	5'7"	(redshirt) Junior	Derby, KS	Transferred to Colorado State

=== Incoming transfers ===
Arkansas incoming transfers
Name	Number	Pos.	Height	Year	Hometown	Previous school
Beautiful Waheed	1	Guard	5'10"	Senior	Milwaukee, WI	St. John's
Grace McCallop	12	Guard	5'10"	Sophomore	Shawnee Mission, KS	California
Ayianna Johnson	13	Forward	6'3"	Senior	Jefferson, WI	UC Colorado Springs (D-II)
Kateri Poole	15	Guard	5'8"	Graduate Student	The Bronx, NY	Houston
Jianna Morris	22	Guard	5'7"	Senior	Sherwood, AR	Louisiana Tech
D'Asia Thomas-Harris	32	Guard/Forward	6'2"	Senior	Katy, TX	Georgia Tech
Daniah Trammell	33	Forward	6'1"	Sophomore	Cincinnati, OH	Arizona

=== Recruiting class ===
College recruiting
Name	Hometown	School	Height	Weight	Commit date
Whitley Rogers; G	Little Rock, AR	Little Rock Christian Academy	6 ft 0 in (1.83 m)	N/A	Dec 29, 2025
Whitley Rogers; G	Recruit ratings: Rivals: 247Sports: ESPN: (94)				
Kyiah Prestridge; F	Oklahoma City, OK	Westmoore High School	6 ft 0 in (1.83 m)	N/A	Nov 12, 2025
Kyiah Prestridge; F	Recruit ratings: Rivals: ESPN: (91)				
Overall recruit ranking:
Note: In many cases, Scout, Rivals, 247Sports, On3, and ESPN may conflict in their listings of height and weight.; In these cases, the average was taken. ESPN grades are on a 100-point scale.; Sources: "2026 Player Commits". ESPN. Archived from the original on July 28, 2026.

== Preseason ==
On October 12, 2026, the SEC released its annual preseason media poll and awards. Arkansas was picked to finish last in the conference.

=== Preseason rankings ===
SEC Preseason Poll
Place	Team
1	South Carolina
2	Texas
3	LSU
4	Vanderbilt
5	Kentucky
6	Oklahoma
7	Ole Miss
8	Tennessee
9	Mississippi State
10	Alabama
11	Texas A&M
12	Florida
13	Georgia
14	Missouri
15	Auburn
16	Arkansas

=== Preseason All-SEC Teams ===
No players were named to the All-SEC First or Second Team.

== Roster ==
2026–27 Arkansas Razorbacks women's basketball team
Players
Coaches

Pos.	#	Name	Height	Year	Previous school	Hometown
G	0	Beautiful Waheed	5 ft 10 in (1.78 m)	Sr	Milwaukee Academy of Science; St. John's	Milwaukee, WI
G	1	Whitley Rogers	5 ft 10 in (1.78 m)	Fr	Little Rock Christian Academy	Little Rock, AR
G	3	Allannah Orsby	6 ft 0 in (1.83 m)	Fr	Phillips Exeter Academy	Jonesboro, AR
G	9	Julija Matic	6 ft 0 in (1.83 m)	Fr	First Sports Basketball High School	Bellinzona, Switzerland
F	11	Adriana Reijnen	6 ft 4 in (1.93 m)	Fr	Coppell High School	Amsterdam, Netherlands
G	12	Grace McCallop	5 ft 10 in (1.78 m)	So	Bishop Miege High School; California	Shawnee Mission, KS
F	13	Ayianna Johnson	6 ft 3 in (1.91 m)	Sr	Jefferson High School; UC Colorado Springs	Jefferson, WI
G	15	Kateri Poole	5 ft 8 in (1.73 m)	GS	South Shore High School; Houston	Bronx, NY
G	21	Kyiah Prestridge	6 ft 1 in (1.85 m)	Fr	Westmoore High School	Oklahoma City, OK
G	22	Jianna Morris	5 ft 7 in (1.7 m)	Sr	Sylvan Hills High School; Louisiana Tech	Sherwood, AR
G	23	Emily Robinson	5 ft 10 in (1.78 m)	Sr	Caddo High School; Oral Roberts	Bokchito, OK
G	24	Aisha Hassan	5 ft 7 in (1.7 m)	RS Fr	Convent of the Scared Heart	Alexandria, Egypt
G/F	32	D'Asia Thomas-Harris	6 ft 2 in (1.88 m)	Jr	Houston Christian High School; Georgia Tech	Katy, TX
F	33	Daniah Trammell	6 ft 1 in (1.85 m)	So	Winton Woods High School; Arizona	Cincinnati, OH

Head coach

- Kelsi Musick (Cameron)

Assistant coach(es)

- Lacey Goldwire (Oklahoma State)
- Nick Bradford (Kansas)
- Alex Furr (Fresno State)
- Dionnah Jackson-Durrett (Oklahoma)

Legend

- (C) Team captain
- (S) Suspended
- (I) Ineligible
- (W) Walk-on
- Injured
- Current redshirt

Roster

== Schedule and results ==
Date time, TV	Rank^{#}	Opponent^{#}	Result	Record	High points	High rebounds	High assists	Site (attendance) city, state
Exhibition
October 29, 2026*; 6:30 p.m.		Cameron	W 116–55		26 – Thomas-Harris	21 – Thomas-Harris	3 – Morris, Robinson	Bud Walton Arena (1,648); Fayetteville, AR
Non-conference regular season
November 2, 2026*; 6:30 p.m., SECN+/ESPN+		LSU New Orleans	W 127–48	1–0	23 – Johnson	12 – Prestridge	6 – Prestridge	Bud Walton Arena (1,624); Fayetteville, AR
November 6, 2026*; 10:30 a.m., SECN+/ESPN+		Northwestern State	W 89–59	2–0	18 – Robinson	12 – Thomas-Harris	5 – Rogers	Bud Walton Arena (12,370); Fayetteville, AR
November 9, 2026*; 6:30 p.m., SECN+/ESPN+		Kansas City	W 89–81	3–0	18 – Prestridge	12 – Thomas-Harris	4 – Rogers	Bud Walton Arena (1,622); Fayetteville, AR
November 12, 2026*; 6:30 p.m., SECN+/ESPN+		Arkansas–Pine Bluff	W 95–90	4–0	18 – Morris	6 – Thomas-Harris	5 – McCallop	Bud Walton Arena (1,760); Fayetteville, AR
November 16, 2026*; 7:00 p.m.		at Little Rock	W 86–74	5–0	22 – Robinson	11 – Thomas-Harris	4 – Morris	Jack Stephens Center (1,686); Little Rock, AR
November 24, 2026*; 5:30 p.m., BallerTV		vs. High Point; San Diego Classic						Viejas Arena; San Diego, CA
November 25, 2026*; 5:30 p.m., BallerTV		vs. James Madison; San Diego Classic						Viejas Arena; San Diego, CA
November 29, 2026*; 2:00 p.m., SECN+/ESPN+		Louisiana Tech						Bud Walton Arena; Fayetteville, AR
December 3, 2026*; 8:00 p.m., SECN		Wake Forest; ACC–SEC Challenge						Bud Walton Arena; Fayetteville, AR
December 6, 2026*; 2:00 p.m., SECN+/ESPN+		Arkansas State						Bud Walton Arena; Fayetteville, AR
December 15, 2026*; 6:30 p.m., SECN+/ESPN+		Central Arkansas						Bud Walton Arena; Fayetteville, AR
December 19, 2026*; 2:00 p.m., SECN+/ESPN+		Missouri State						Bud Walton Arena; Fayetteville, AR
December 28, 2026*; 6:30 p.m., SECN+/ESPN+		Louisiana–Monroe						Bud Walton Arena; Fayetteville, AR
SEC regular season
December 31, 2026; 8:00 p.m., SECN		at Vanderbilt						Memorial Gymnasium; Nashville, TN
January 3, 2027; 1:00 p.m., SECN		Florida						Bud Walton Arena; Fayettevile, AR
January 7, 2027; 6:30 p.m., SECN+/ESPN+		Ole Miss						Bud Walton Arena; Fayettevile, AR
January 10, 2027; 3:00 p.m., SECN		at South Carolina						Colonial Life Arena; Columbia, SC
January 14, 2027; 6:30 p.m., SECN		at Kentucky						Memorial Coliseum; Lexington, KY
January 17, 2027; 1:00 p.m., SECN		LSU						Bud Walton Arena; Fayetteville, AR
January 21, 2027; 5:30 p.m., SECN+/ESPN+		at Georgia						Stegeman Coliseum; Athens, GA
January 28, 2027; 6:30 p.m., SECN+/ESPN+		Mississippi State						Bud Walton Arena; Fayetteville, AR
January 31, 2027; 3:00 p.m., SECN		at Auburn						Neville Arena; Auburn, AL
February 4, 2027; 6:30 p.m., SECN+/ESPN+		Texas A&M						Bud Walton Arena; Fayetteville, AR
February 8, 2027; 6:30 p.m., SECN		at Texas						Moody Center; Austin, TX
February 11, 2027; 6:30 p.m., SECN+/ESPN+		Oklahoma						Bud Walton Arena; Fayetteville, AR
February 14, 2027; 2:00 p.m., SECN+/ESPN+		Alabama						Bud Walton Arena; Fayetteville, AR
February 21, 2027; 4:00 p.m., SECN		at Missouri						Mizzou Arena; Columbia, MO
February 25, 2027; 6:30 p.m., SECN+/ESPN+		at Mississippi State						Humphrey Coliseum; Starkville, MS
February 28, 2027; 2:00 p.m., SECN+/ESPN+		Tennessee						Bud Walton Arena; Fayetteville, AR
SEC tournament
March 3–7, 2027; TBA		vs.						Bon Secours Wellness Arena; Greenville, SC
*Non-conference game. ^{#}Rankings from AP Poll. (#) Tournament seedings in parentheses. All times are in Central.

== See also ==
- 2026–27 Arkansas Razorbacks men's basketball team
