= 2026–27 Vanderbilt Commodores women's basketball team =

Women's basketball season

2026–27 Vanderbilt Commodores women's basketball
- Conference: Southeastern Conference

Ranking
- Coaches: No. 13
- AP: No. 11
- Record: 5–1 (0–0 SEC)
- Head coach: Shea Ralph (6th season)
- Associate head coach: Tom Garrick
- Assistant coaches: Ashley Earley; Eric Mundinger; Kevin DeMille; Kaili McLaren
- Home arena: Memorial Gymnasium

2026–27 SEC women's basketball standings
	Conf.				Overall
Team	W		L	PCT	W		L	PCT
Arkansas	0	–	0	–	5	–	0	1.000
Georgia	0	–	0	–	5	–	0	1.000
No. 12 Kentucky	0	–	0	–	5	–	0	1.000
No. 9 LSU	0	–	0	–	5	–	0	1.000
Mississippi State	0	–	0	–	5	–	0	1.000
Missouri	0	–	0	–	5	–	0	1.000
No. 14 Oklahoma	0	–	0	–	5	–	0	1.000
No. 1 South Carolina	0	–	0	–	5	–	0	1.000
Tennessee	0	–	0	–	5	–	0	1.000
No. 19т Ole Miss	0	–	0	–	4	–	0	1.000
No. 6 Texas	0	–	0	–	4	–	0	1.000
Texas A&M	0	–	0	–	4	–	0	1.000
Alabama	0	–	0	–	5	–	1	.833
Auburn	0	–	0	–	4	–	1	.800
No. 11 Vanderbilt	0	–	0	–	4	–	1	.800
Florida	0	–	0	–	3	–	2	.600
† 2027 SEC tournament winner As of November 19, 2026; Rankings from AP poll

The 2026–27 Vanderbilt Commodores women's basketball team currently represents Vanderbilt University during the 2026–27 NCAA Division I women's basketball season. The Commodores, led by sixth-year head coach Shea Ralph, play their home games at the Memorial Gymnasium in Nashville, Tennessee, and compete as a member of the Southeastern Conference (SEC).

== Previous season ==
The Commodores finished the 2025–26 season 29–5 overall and 13–3 in SEC play, to finish in a tie for second place in the conference with Texas. As the No. 2 seed in the SEC tournament, they were upset by No. 7 Ole Miss.

Following their tournament elimination, the Commodores earned an at-large bid to the NCAA tournament, where they were the No. 2 seed in the Fort Worth Regional #1. They defeated No. 15 High Point and No. 7 Illinois in the first and second rounds respectively, before falling to No. 6 Notre Dame 65–67 in the Sweet Sixteen.

The 2025–26 season saw much success for Vanderbilt, including their most wins in a season (29) since 1994–95, when they finished 28–7. Their 13–3 conference record was their best finish in the SEC in program history, and their Sweet Sixteen appearance marked the first one for the Commodores since 2009.

== Offseason ==
=== Departures ===
Vanderbilt departures
Name	Num.	Pos.	Height	Year	Hometown	Reason for departure
Jada Brown	2	Guard	5'8"	Senior	Bentonville, AR	Graduated
Ava Black	8	Guard	5'11"	Freshman	Auburn, NH	Transferred to Penn State
Justine Pissott	13	Guard/forward	6'4"	Senior	Toms River, NJ	Graduated; selected 25th overall by the Indiana Fever in the 2026 WNBA draft
Ndjakalenga Mwenentanda	15	Guard	6'2"	Graduate student	Sioux Falls, SD	Graduated; went undrafted in the 2026 WNBA draft, signed a training camp contract with the Golden State Valkyries
Aga Makurat	24	Guard	6'3"	Junior	Sierakowice, Poland	Transferred to Florida State
Sacha Washington	35	Forward	6'2"	Graduate student	Lawrenceville, GA	Graduated; went undrafted in the 2026 WNBA draft, signed a training camp contract with the Atlanta Dream

=== Incoming transfers ===
Vanderbilt incoming transfers
Name	Num.	Pos.	Height	Year	Hometown	Previous school
Saniyah Glenn-Bello	2	Guard	6'1"	Graduate Student (Note: Glenn-Bello is currently eligible, pending litigation, to play a final year in the 2026-27 season following a preliminary injunction granted in Glancey v. NCAA, an August lawsuit challenging the NCAA’s age-based eligibility model, which excluded the class of 2022.)	Staten Island, NY	Harvard
Vernell Atamah	15	Guard/Forward	6'0"	Junior	Mesquite, TX	Northwestern State
Mia Woolfolk	33	Forward	6'3"	Junior	Midlothian, VA	Georgia

=== Recruiting class ===
College recruiting
Name	Hometown	School	Height	Weight	Commit date
Olivia Jones; G	Brookville, NY	Long Island Lutheran High School	5 ft 11 in (1.80 m)	N/A	
Olivia Jones; G	Recruit ratings: Rivals: 247Sports: ESPN: (96)				
Jhai Johnson; F	Oakland, CA	Oakland Technical High School	6 ft 3 in (1.91 m)	N/A	
Jhai Johnson; F	Recruit ratings: Rivals: 247Sports: ESPN: (95)				
Overall recruit ranking: ESPN: 11
Note: In many cases, Scout, Rivals, 247Sports, On3, and ESPN may conflict in their listings of height and weight.; In these cases, the average was taken. ESPN grades are on a 100-point scale.; Sources: "2026 Player Commits". ESPN. Archived from the original on August 2, 2026.

== Preseason ==
On October 12, 2026, the SEC released its annual preseason media poll and awards. Vanderbilt was picked to finish fourth in the conference.

=== Preseason rankings ===
SEC Preseason Poll
Place	Team
1	South Carolina
2	Texas
3	LSU
4	Vanderbilt
5	Kentucky
6	Oklahoma
7	Ole Miss
8	Tennessee
9	Mississippi State
10	Alabama
11	Texas A&M
12	Florida
13	Georgia
14	Missouri
15	Auburn
16	Arkansas

=== Preseason All-SEC Teams ===
Preseason All-SEC Teams
Player	Year	Position	Team
Mikayla Blakes	Junior	Guard	First

=== Other awards ===
Preseason All-SEC Teams
Player	Year	Position	Award won
Mikayla Blakes	Junior	Guard	Preseason Player of the Year

== Roster ==
2026–27 Vanderbilt Commodores women's basketball team
Players
Coaches

Pos.	#	Name	Height	Year	Previous school	Hometown
G	0	Olivia Jones	5 ft 11 in (1.8 m)	Fr	Long Island Lutheran High School	Brookville, NY
G	1	Mikayla Blakes	5 ft 8 in (1.73 m)	Jr	Rutgers Prep	Somerset, NJ
G	2	Saniyah Glenn-Bello	6 ft 1 in (1.85 m)	GS	Christ the King Regional High School; Harvard	Staten Island, NY
G	3	Aubrey Galvan	5 ft 6 in (1.68 m)	So	Loyola Academy	Deerfield, IL
G	4	Madison Greene	5 ft 6 in (1.68 m)	Sr	Pickerington High School Central	Columbus, OH
F	5	Jhai Johnson	6 ft 4 in (1.93 m)	Fr	Oakland Technical High School	Oakland, CA
F	7	Sther Ubaka	6 ft 1 in (1.85 m)	Fr	DME Academy	São Paulo, Brazil
F	11	Monique Williams	6 ft 1 in (1.85 m)	So	Willetton Senior High School	Perth, Australia
F	14	Aiyana Mitchell	6 ft 4 in (1.93 m)	Sr	Fountain-Fort Carson High School	Colorado Springs, CO
G/F	15	Vernell Atamah	6 ft 0 in (1.83 m)	Jr	John Horn High School; Northwestern State	Mesquite, TX
F	30	Trinity Wilson	6 ft 3 in (1.91 m)	Jr	Lakeville North High School	Lakeville, MN
C	32	Aalyah Del Rosario	6 ft 6 in (1.98 m)	Sr	The Webb School; LSU	The Bronx, NY
F	33	Mia Woolfolk	6 ft 3 in (1.91 m)	Jr	Manchester High School; Georgia	Midlothian, VA

Head coach

- Shea Ralph (Connecticut)

Assistant coach(es)

- Tom Garrick (Rhode Island)
- Ashley Earley (Vanderbilt)
- Eric Mundinger (Memphis)
- Kevin DeMille (Connecticut)
- Kaili McLaren (Connecticut)

Legend

- (C) Team captain
- (S) Suspended
- (I) Ineligible
- (W) Walk-on
- Injured
- Current redshirt

Roster
Last update: August 2, 2026

== Schedule and results ==
Date time, TV	Rank^{#}	Opponent^{#}	Result	Record	High points	High rebounds	High assists	Site (attendance) city, state
Non-conference regular season
November 2, 2026*; 11:00 a.m., SECN+	No. 8	Lipscomb	W 112–53	1–0	27 – Blakes	9 – Blakes	11 – Galvan	Memorial Gymnasium (7,023); Nashville, TN
November 4, 2026*; 6:30 p.m., SECN+	No. 8	Queens	W 100–42	2–0	24 – Blakes	5 – Blakes	6 – Galvan	Memorial Gymnasium (2,806); Nashville, TN
November 9, 2026*; 6:30 p.m., SECN+	No. 8	Morehead State	W 102–50	3–0	25 – Blakes	10 – Mitchell	10 – Galvan	Memorial Gymnasium (3,146); Nashville, TN
November 11, 2026*; 6:30 p.m., SECN+	No. 8	Western Kentucky	W 101–59	4–0	27 – Woolfolk	7 – Mitchell	6 – Galvan	Memorial Gymnasium (3,190); Nashville, TN
November 15, 2026*; 12:00 p.m., FS1	No. 8	vs. No. 10т Iowa; Bad Boy Mower Series – Sioux City	L 65–75	4–1	20 – Blakes	8 – Blakes	4 – Galvan	Tyson Events Center (6,413); Sioux City, IA
November 18, 2026*; 6:30 p.m., SECN+	No. 11	North Alabama	W 80–44	5–1	19 – Woolfolk	6 – Tied	6 – Blakes	Memorial Gymnasium (3,063); Nashville, TN
November 23, 2026*; 4:00 p.m., Spiideo		vs. Arizona; Jacksonville Classic						The Reef; Jacksonville, FL
November 25, 2026*; 5:30 p.m., Spiideo		vs. Oregon State; Jacksonville Classic						The Reef; Jacksonville, FL
November 29, 2026*; 12:00 p.m., SECN		Georgia State						Memorial Gymnasium; Nashville, TN
December 3, 2026*; 8:00 p.m., ESPN		Notre Dame; ACC–SEC Challenge						Memorial Gymnasium; Nashville, TN
December 6, 2026*; 1:00 p.m., SECN		South Alabama						Memorial Gymnasium; Nashville, TN
December 9, 2026*; 4:00 p.m., ESPN+		at Davidson						John M. Belk Arena; Davidson, NC
December 18, 2026*; 7:30 p.m., ESPNU		vs. Belmont; Bad Boy Mower Series – Nashville						Bridgestone Arena; Nashville, TN
December 21, 2026*; 12:00 p.m., SECN+		Tennessee State						Memorial Gymnasium; Nashville, TN
December 28, 2026*; 6:30 p.m., SECN+		Little Rock						Memorial Gymnasium; Nashville, TN
SEC regular season
December 31, 2026; 8:00 p.m., SECN		Arkansas						Memorial Gymnasium; Nashville, TN
January 3, 2027; 12:00 p.m., ABC		at LSU						Pete Maravich Assembly Center; Baton Rouge, LA
January 7, 2027; 6:00 p.m., SECN+		at Auburn						Neville Arena; Auburn, AL
January 10, 2027; 5:00 p.m., SECN		Mississippi State						Memorial Gymnasium; Nashville, TN
January 14, 2027; 8:30 p.m., SECN		Texas A&M						Memorial Gymnasium; Nashville, TN
January 17, 2027; 12:00 p.m., ABC		at Texas						Moody Center; Austin, TX
January 21, 2027; 6:30 p.m., SECN+		at Missouri						Mizzou Arena; Columbia, MO
January 24, 2027; 2:00 p.m., SECN+		Georgia						Memorial Gymnasium; Nashville, TN
January 28, 2027; 8:00 p.m., ESPN2		at Oklahoma						Lloyd Noble Center; Norman, OK
February 4, 2027; 6:00 p.m., ESPN		South Carolina						Memorial Gymnasium; Nashville, TN
February 7, 2027; TBA, ESPN		Tennessee; Rivalry						Memorial Gymnasium; Nashville, TN
February 11, 2027; 7:30 p.m., SECN		at Alabama						Coleman Coliseum; Tuscaloosa, AL
February 15, 2027; 5:00 p.m., ESPN2		at Kentucky						Memorial Coliseum; Lexington, KY
February 21, 2027; 11:00 a.m., ESPN		Ole Miss						Memorial Gymnasium; Nashville, TN
February 25, 2027; 6:30 p.m., SECN+		Missouri						Memorial Gymnasium; Nashville, TN
February 28, 2027; 12:00 p.m., SECN+		at Florida						O'Connell Center; Gainesville, FL
SEC tournament
March 3–7, 2027; TBA		vs.						Bon Secours Wellness Arena; Greenville, SC
*Non-conference game. ^{#}Rankings from AP Poll. (#) Tournament seedings in parentheses. All times are in Central.

== Rankings ==
Ranking movements Legend: ██ Increase in ranking ██ Decrease in ranking
	Week																				
Poll	Pre	1	2	3	4	5	6	7	8	9	10	11	12	13	14	15	16	17	18	19	Final
AP	8	8	11																		
Coaches	9	8	13																		
