= Mike Hermann =

Mike Hermann may refer to:

- Mike Hermann (American football) (fl. 2010s)
- Mike Hermann (athletic director) (fl. 1980s–2020s)

== See also ==
- Mike Herrmann (born 1966), German sports shooter
