= 2026–27 Kentucky Wildcats women's basketball team =

American collegiate basketball season

2026–27 Kentucky Wildcats women's basketball
- Conference: Southeastern Conference

Ranking
- Coaches: No. 9
- AP: No. 12
- Record: 6–0 (0–0 SEC)
- Head coach: Kenny Brooks (3rd season)
- Assistant coaches: Lindsey Hicks; Radvile Autukaite; Josh Petersen
- Home arena: Memorial Coliseum; Rupp Arena

2026–27 SEC women's basketball standings
	Conf.				Overall
Team	W		L	PCT	W		L	PCT
No. 12 Kentucky	0	–	0	–	6	–	0	1.000
No. 9 LSU	0	–	0	–	6	–	0	1.000
No. 14 Oklahoma	0	–	0	–	6	–	0	1.000
Tennessee	0	–	0	–	6	–	0	1.000
Arkansas	0	–	0	–	5	–	0	1.000
Mississippi State	0	–	0	–	5	–	0	1.000
Missouri	0	–	0	–	5	–	0	1.000
No. 1 South Carolina	0	–	0	–	5	–	0	1.000
No. 6 Texas	0	–	0	–	5	–	0	1.000
Texas A&M	0	–	0	–	5	–	0	1.000
Alabama	0	–	0	–	6	–	1	.857
Auburn	0	–	0	–	5	–	1	.833
Georgia	0	–	0	–	5	–	1	.833
No. 11 Vanderbilt	0	–	0	–	5	–	1	.833
No. 19т Ole Miss	0	–	0	–	4	–	1	.800
Florida	0	–	0	–	4	–	2	.667
† 2027 SEC tournament winner As of November 21, 2026; Rankings from AP poll

The 2026–27 Kentucky Wildcats women's basketball team currently represents the University of Kentucky during the 2026–27 NCAA Division I women's basketball season. The Wildcats, led by third-year head coach Kenny Brooks, primarily play their home games at the Memorial Coliseum in Lexington, Kentucky with 2 games at Rupp Arena, and compete as a member of the Southeastern Conference (SEC).

== Previous season ==
The Wildcats finished the 2025–26 season 25–11 overall and 8–8 in SEC play, finishing in a four-way tie for sixth in the conference with Tennessee, Georgia and Ole Miss. As the No. 9 seed in the SEC tournament, they defeated No. 16 Arkansas 94–64 and No. 8 seed Georgia 76–61 in the first and second rounds respectively, before falling in a 64–87 loss to top-seeded South Carolina in the quarterfinals.

Following the SEC tournament, the Wildcats received an at-large bid to the NCAA tournament, where they were seeded No. 5 in the Fort Worth #3 Regional. They defeated No. 12 James Madison 71–56 and came out with a one-point 74–73 victory over No. 4 West Virginia in the first and second rounds respectively. The Wildcats advanced to the Sweet Sixteen for the first time since 2016, but lost to fellow SEC member and top-seeded Texas 54–76, ending their season.

== Offseason ==
=== Departures ===
Kentucky departures
Name	Num	Pos.	Height	Year	Hometown	Reason for departure
Jordan Obi	0	Guard	6'1"	Graduate student	Hartford, CT	Graduated; selected 44th overall by the Las Vegas Aces in the 2026 WNBA draft
Lexi Blue	4	Guard	6'2"	Sophomore	Orlando, FL	Transferred to Northwestern
Tonie Morgan	5	Guard	5'9"	Senior	Tallahassee, FL	Graduated; selected 32nd overall by the Chicago Sky in the 2026 WNBA draft
Teonni Key	7	Forward	6'5"	Senior	Cary, NC	Graduated; selected 22nd overall by the Toronto Tempo in the 2026 WNBA draft
Elsa Vadfors	15	Center	6'5"	Freshman	Hudiksvall, Sweden	Transferred to East Tennessee State
Kaelyn Carroll	20	Forward	6'3"	Freshman	Dedham, MA	Transferred to Washington
Amelia Hassett	32	Forward	6'3"	Senior	Albury, Australia	Graduated; selected 35th overall by the Los Angeles Sparks in the 2026 WNBA draft
Josie Gilvin	33	Guard	6'0"	Senior	Louisville, KY	Graduated

=== Incoming transfers ===
Kentucky incoming transfers
Name	Num	Pos.	Height	Year	Hometown	Previous school
Me'Arah O'Neal	2	Guard/Forward	6'4"	Junior	Houston, TX	Florida
Jemma Amoore	4	Guard	5'4"	Junior	Ballarat, Australia	IU Indy
Diana Collins	20	Guard	5'9	Senior	Lilburn, GA	Alabama
Ayanna Patterson	34	Forward	6'2"	(redshirt) Junior	Fort Wayne, IN	UConn

=== Recruiting class ===
College recruiting
Name	Hometown	School	Height	Weight	Commit date
Maddyn Greenway; PG	Wayzata, MN	Providence Academy	5 ft 8 in (1.73 m)	N/A	
Maddyn Greenway; PG	Recruit ratings: Rivals: 247Sports: ESPN: (96)				
Savvy Swords; W	Sudbury, Ontario	Long Island Lutheran High School	6 ft 1 in (1.85 m)	N/A	
Savvy Swords; W	Recruit ratings: Rivals: 247Sports: ESPN: (96)				
Emily McDonald; G	Buffalo, NY	Long Island Lutheran High School	6 ft 0 in (1.83 m)	N/A	
Emily McDonald; G	Recruit ratings: Rivals: 247Sports: ESPN: (96)				
Overall recruit ranking: ESPN: 6
Note: In many cases, Scout, Rivals, 247Sports, On3, and ESPN may conflict in their listings of height and weight.; In these cases, the average was taken. ESPN grades are on a 100-point scale.; Sources: "2026 Player Commits". ESPN. Archived from the original on July 20, 2026.

== Preseason ==
On October 12, 2026, the SEC released its annual preseason media poll and awards. Kentucky was picked to finish fifth in the conference.

=== Preseason rankings ===
SEC Preseason Poll
Place	Team
1	South Carolina
2	Texas
3	LSU
4	Vanderbilt
5	Kentucky
6	Oklahoma
7	Ole Miss
8	Tennessee
9	Mississippi State
10	Alabama
11	Texas A&M
12	Florida
13	Georgia
14	Missouri
15	Auburn
16	Arkansas

=== Preseason All-SEC Teams ===
Preseason All-SEC Teams
Player	Year	Position	Team
Clara Strack	Senior	Center	First

== Roster ==
2026–27 Kentucky Wildcats women's basketball team
Players
Coaches

Pos.	#	Name	Height	Year	Previous school	Hometown
F	2	Me'Arah O'Neal	6 ft 4 in (1.93 m)	Jr	Episcopal High School; Florida	Houston, TX
F	3	Emily McDonald	6 ft 0 in (1.83 m)	Fr	Long Island Lutheran High School	Buffalo, NY
G	4	Jemma Amoore	5 ft 4 in (1.63 m)	Jr	Ballarat Miners; IU Indy	Ballarat, Australia
G	7	Ajša Sivka	6 ft 4 in (1.93 m)			Slovenia
G	8	Asia Boone	5 ft 8 in (1.73 m)	Sr	IMG Academy; Liberty	San Diego, CA
G	11	Gabby Brooks	5 ft 10 in (1.78 m)	Sr	Blacksburg High School; Virginia Tech	Harrisonburg, VA
G	12	Dominika Paurová	6 ft 1 in (1.85 m)	RS So	DME Academy; Oregon State	Mladá Boleslav, Czech Republic
C	13	Clara Strack	6 ft 5 in (1.96 m)	Sr	Hamburg High School; Virginia Tech	Buffalo, NY
G	20	Diana Collins	5 ft 9 in (1.75 m)	Sr	Brookwood High School; Alabama	Lilburn, GA
F	21	Savvy Swords	6 ft 2 in (1.88 m)	Fr	Long Island Lutheran High School	Sudbury, ON
G	30	Maddyn Greenway	5 ft 8 in (1.73 m)	Fr	Providence Academy	Wayzata, MN
F	34	Ayanna Patterson	6 ft 2 in (1.88 m)	RS Jr	Homestead High School; UConn	Fort Wayne, IN

Head coach

- Kenny Brooks (James Madison)

Assistant coach(es)

- Lindsey Hicks (Purdue)
- Radvile Autukaite (Reinhardt)
- Josh Petersen (Florida State)

Legend

- (C) Team captain
- (S) Suspended
- (I) Ineligible
- (W) Walk-on
- Injured
- Current redshirt

Roster
Last update: November 6, 2026

== Schedule and results ==
Date time, TV	Rank^{#}	Opponent^{#}	Result	Record	High points	High rebounds	High assists	Site (attendance) city, state
Non-conference regular season
November 2, 2026*; 6:30 p.m., SECN+/ESPN+	No. 14	Morehead State	W 85–42	1–0	17 – Strack	11 – Swords	8 – Sivka	Memorial Coliseum (4,099); Lexington, KY
November 5, 2026*; 6:30 p.m., SECN+/ESPN+	No. 14	Northern Kentucky	W 79–28	2–0	21 – Boone	10 – Strack	5 – Collins	Memorial Coliseum (3,917); Lexington, KY
November 8, 2026*; 3:00 p.m., ESPN2	No. 14	vs. No. 25 NC State; Ally Tipoff	W 93–78	3–0	32 – Sivka	8 – Strack	4 – Tied	Spectrum Center; Charlotte, NC
November 11, 2026*; 6:30 p.m., SECN+/ESPN+	No. 12	Evansville	W 98–30	4–0	27 – McDonald	13 – Swords	8 – Greenway	Memorial Coliseum (4,117); Lexington, KY
November 15, 2026*; 12:00 p.m., SECN	No. 12	Eastern Michigan	W 81–47	5–0	29 – Strack	18 – Strack	5 – Greenway	Memorial Coliseum (4,347); Lexington, KY
November 20, 2026*; 6:00 p.m., SECN+/ESPN+	No. 12	Marshall	W 85–49	6–0	21 – O'Neal	9 – Tied	4 – Collins	Memorial Coliseum (4,324); Lexington, KY
November 27, 2026*; 3:30 p.m., BallerTV		vs. Maine; Daytona Beach Classic						Ocean Center; Daytona Beach, FL
November 28, 2026*; 3:30 p.m., BallerTV		vs. South Dakota State; Daytona Beach Classic						Ocean Center; Daytona Beach, FL
December 3, 2026*; 7:00 p.m., ESPN2		Clemson; ACC–SEC Challenge						Rupp Arena; Lexington, KY
December 6, 2026*; 2:00 p.m., SECN+/ESPN+		Bellarmine						Memorial Coliseum; Lexington, KY
December 9, 2026*; 9:00 p.m., ESPN		Louisville; Rivalry						Rupp Arena; Lexington, KY
December 13, 2026*; 12:00 p.m., NEC Front Row		at Le Moyne						Ted Grant Court; Syracuse, NY
December 20, 2026*; 3:30 p.m., ESPN2		vs. Virginia; Sprouts Farmers Market espnW Invitational						Bridgestone Arena; Nashville, TN
December 28, 2026*; 3:00 p.m., SECN+/ESPN+		Kent State						Memorial Coliseum; Lexington, KY
SEC regular season
December 31, 2026; 3:00 p.m., SECN+/ESPN+		at Florida						O'Connell Center; Gainesville, FL
January 3, 2026; 12:00 p.m., SECN		Auburn						Memorial Coliseum; Lexington, KY
January 7, 2027; 7:30 p.m., SECN+/ESPN+		at Missouri						Mizzou Arena; Columbia, MO
January 10, 2026; 2:00 p.m., ABC		Texas						Memorial Coliseum; Lexington, KY
January 14, 2026; 7:30 p.m., SECN		Arkansas						Memorial Coliseum; Lexington, KY
January 21, 2026; 8:00 p.m., ESPNU		Tennessee; Rivalry						Memorial Coliseum; Lexington, KY
January 24, 2026; 2:00 p.m., ESPN/ESPN2/ESPNU		at Oklahoma						Lloyd Noble Center; Norman, OK
January 28, 2026; 8:30 p.m., SECN		Alabama						Memorial Coliseum; Lexington, KY
January 31, 2026; 3:00 p.m., ESPN		at South Carolina						Colonial Life Arena; Columbia, SC
February 4, 2026; 8:00 p.m., ESPN2		LSU						Memorial Coliseum; Lexington, KY
February 7, 2026; 12:00 p.m., SECN		at Georgia						Stegeman Coliseum; Athens, GA
February 11, 2026; 7:00 p.m., SECN+/ESPN+		at Ole Miss						SJB Pavilion; Oxford, MS
February 15, 2026; 6:00 p.m., ESPN2		Vanderbilt						Memorial Coliseum; Lexington, KY
February 21, 2026; 1:00 p.m., SECN		at Tennessee; Rivalry						Thompson–Boling Arena; Knoxville, TN
February 25, 2026; 8:00 p.m., SECN+/ESPN+		at Texas A&M						Reed Arena; College Station, TX
February 28, 2026; 2:00 p.m., SECN		Mississippi State						Memorial Coliseum; Lexington, KY
SEC tournament
March 3–7, 2027; TBA		vs.						Bon Secours Wellness Arena; Greenville, SC
*Non-conference game. ^{#}Rankings from AP Poll. (#) Tournament seedings in parentheses. All times are in Eastern.

== Rankings ==
Ranking movements Legend: ██ Increase in ranking ██ Decrease in ranking
	Week																				
Poll	Pre	1	2	3	4	5	6	7	8	9	10	11	12	13	14	15	16	17	18	19	Final
AP	14	12	12																		
Coaches	14	10	9																		

== See also ==
- 2026–27 Kentucky Wildcats men's basketball team
