= 2026–27 NCAA Division I women's basketball season =

American collegiate basketball season

- Preseason AP No. 1: South Carolina
- Regular season: November 1, 2026 – March 14, 2027
- NCAA Tournament: 2027
- Tournament dates: March 17 – April 4, 2027
- National Championship: Nationwide Arena; Columbus, Ohio

The 2026–27 NCAA Division I women's basketball season will begin on November 1, 2026. The regular season will end on March 14, 2027. The 2027 NCAA Division I women's basketball tournament will begin with the March Madness opening round on March 17 and end with the championship game on April 4, at Nationwide Arena in Columbus, Ohio.

== Season headlines ==
- April 8, 2026 – Ross Dellenger, a sports reporter from Yahoo Sports, reported that the NCAA was considering a new athletic eligibility framework. Under the proposal, NCAA athletes would have five full years of eligibility, starting on their 19th birthday or high school graduation, whichever is sooner. No redshirting would be allowed, even for medical reasons. Existing eligibility waivers for military service, religious missions, or (for women) maternity leave, would not be affected.
- April 10 — UC Santa Barbara announced it would return to the West Coast Conference (WCC) for the 2027–28 season after having been absent for nearly 60 years. UCSB had been a WCC member from 1964 to 1969, but left to join the Pacific Coast Athletic Association, now known as the Big West Conference, and had been in the PCAA/Big West ever since, except for a stint as a Division I independent from 1974 to 1976.
- April 17 – Notre Dame and Villanova announced that their men's and women's teams would open the 2026–27 season with a November 1 doubleheader in Rome. The schools noted that the event was inspired by Pope Leo XIV's background as an Augustinian friar and Villanova alumnus.
- May 7 – The NCAA announced that the Division I men's and women's basketball tournaments would expand from 68 to 76 teams starting with the 2026–27 season.
- May 27 – The Metro Atlantic Athletic Conference announced that it would rename itself as the Metro Conference effective July 1.
- June 5 – The NCAA Division I Cabinet slightly modified the age-based eligibility proposal, addressing concerns raised by the men's basketball and men's ice hockey communities, as well as the service academies. Under the new proposal, expected to be voted on by the end of June, athletes' eligibility clocks would start upon their full-time college enrollment or the start of the academic year following their 19th birthday, whichever is sooner.
- June 23 – The Division I Cabinet unanimously approved the age-based eligibility proposal as modified earlier that month, officially taking effect with the end of the Cabinet's meeting the next day. Students enrolling full-time in college for the first time in 2026, plus those who had remaining eligibility under previous rules at the end of 2025–26, can use whichever model is most advantageous to them. Those who exhausted their eligibility under previous rules in 2025–26 will not receive any additional eligibility, even if they initially enrolled in 2022–23 (giving them four years of eligibility).
- June 24 – On the same day the new age-based eligibility model took effect, a group of 15 college basketball players, all of whom graduated from high school in 2022 and exhausted their eligibility under the previous rules in 2025–26, filed suit in Hamilton County, Ohio challenging the application of the new model to their high school cohort. Other suits on similar grounds were expected to be filed in other states.
- June 26 – The Coastal Athletic Association (CAA) announced that Fairfield would join from the Metro Conference in July 2027.
- July 1 – The University of New Orleans rejoined the Louisiana State University System, adopting the new name of LSU New Orleans. The university's athletic colors changed accordingly to purple and gold, though they retained the Privateers nickname.
- July 10 – The NCAA announced a significant change to bracketing policy for the Division I women's tournament. Effective immediately, bracketing of the top 16 teams will be based solely on their true ranking by the selection committee, without regard to conference affiliation. In another change brought about by the expansion to a 76-team field, the baseline for the committee's Wins Against Bubble metric was changed from the #45 team in the NET ranking to #55.
- July 31 – Rulings in two separate court cases undercut the NCAA's planned "five for five" eligibility model as applied to 2022 high school graduates. First, a Tennessee state court judge granted a temporary injunction that allowed 19 basketball players in that class an extra season of eligibility. Several hours later, a federal judge in Colorado issued a preliminary injunction that applied to all members of the high school class of 2022 who had exhausted athletic eligibility, regardless of sport, and also provided those individuals an extra season of eligibility. The NCAA was expected to appeal.
- October 12 – The American Conference announced that James Madison, a Sun Belt Conference (SBC) member that houses its women's lacrosse and women's swimming & diving teams in the American, would join that conference for all sports no later than July 1, 2028.
- October 22 – The Metro Conference announced that Le Moyne would join from the NEC in July 2027.
- November 13 – The Metro announced that it would add a second member from the NEC, Stonehill, in July 2027.
- November 19 – James Madison and the SBC reached a settlement that pushed the Dukes' departure date from that conference forward to July 2027.

=== Milestones and records ===
- November 5 – LSU recorded the largest-ever margin victory of a Division I opponent (109) against another in their 131–22 home win over Texas Southern.

== Conference membership changes ==
A total of 29 schools started play in new conferences for the 2026–27 season. The Pac-12 Conference resumed full operation after a two-season hiatus, with legacy members Oregon State and Washington State joined by seven new members. Another 18 schools moved within Division I, one started reclassification from NCAA Division II, and one started reclassification to NCAA Division III. This does not include the three legacy Western Athletic Conference members (Abilene Christian, Tarleton State, UT Arlington) that remained members through that conference's renaming as the United Athletic Conference.

School	Former conference	Current conference
Austin Peay	Atlantic Sun	United Athletic
Boise State	Mountain West	Pac-12
California Baptist	Western Athletic	Big West
Central Arkansas	Atlantic Sun	United Athletic
Colorado State	Mountain West	Pac-12
Denver	Summit League	West Coast
Eastern Kentucky	Atlantic Sun	United Athletic
Fresno State	Mountain West	Pac-12
Gonzaga	West Coast	Pac-12
Hawaii	Big West	Mountain West
Little Rock	Ohio Valley	United Athletic
Louisiana Tech	CUSA	Sun Belt
North Alabama	Atlantic Sun	United Athletic
Northern Illinois	MAC	Horizon
Oregon State	West Coast	Pac-12
Sacramento State	Big Sky	Big West
Saint Francis	NEC	PAC (D–III)
San Diego State	Mountain West	Pac-12
Southern Utah	Western Athletic	Big Sky
Tennessee Tech	Ohio Valley	Southern
Texas State	Sun Belt	Pac-12
UC Davis	Big West	Mountain West
UTEP	CUSA	Mountain West
Utah State	Mountain West	Pac-12
Utah Tech	Western Athletic	Big Sky
Utah Valley	Western Athletic	Big West
Washington State	West Coast	Pac-12
West Florida	Gulf South (D–II)	Atlantic Sun
West Georgia	Atlantic Sun	United Athletic

The 2026–27 season is the last in their respective conferences for at least six Division I schools.

School	2026–27 conference	Future conference
Fairfield	Metro	CAA
James Madison	Sun Belt	American
Le Moyne	NEC	Metro
Stonehill	NEC	Metro
UC San Diego	Big West	West Coast
UC Santa Barbara	Big West	West Coast

== Arenas ==
=== New arenas ===
IU Indy left the IU Indy Gymnasium, also known as The Jungle, after 44 seasons for the new James T. Morris Arena. The arena opened on October 16 with a women's volleyball match between the Jaguars and Wright State, with the first basketball game on November 2 seeing the Jaguars men defeat Miami Middletown. The Jaguars defeated SIUE 70–69 in the women's basketball opener on November 5.

=== Planned openings for 2027 ===
The 2026–27 season is intended to be the last for Western Michigan men's and women's basketball at the teams' current on-campus home of University Arena. Both teams are planned to move to the new Kalamazoo Event Center in downtown Kalamazoo.

== Seasonal outlook ==
The Top 25 from the AP and USA Today Coaching polls

=== Pre-season polls ===
AP
Ranking	Team
1	South Carolina (23)
2	UConn (6)
3	USC (2)
4	Duke
5	Michigan
6	Texas
7	Louisville
8	Vanderbilt
9	LSU
10	Iowa
11	UCLA
12	North Carolina
13	Notre Dame
14	Kentucky
15	TCU
16	Washington
17	Minnesota
18	Ohio State
19	Ole Miss
20	Maryland
21	Oklahoma
22	Oklahoma State
23	Illinois
24	West Virginia
25	NC State

USA Today Coaches
Ranking	Team
1	South Carolina (26)
2	UConn (6)
3	USC
4	Duke
5	Michigan
6	Texas
7	Louisville
8	LSU
9	Vanderbilt
10	Iowa
11	North Carolina
12	UCLA
13	Notre Dame
14	Kentucky
15	Washington
16	TCU
17	Maryland
18	Minnesota
19	Oklahoma State
20	Ohio State
21	Oklahoma
22	Illinois
23	Ole Miss
24	West Virginia
25	NC State

== Top 10 matchups ==
=== Regular season ===
- Nov. 5, 2026
  - No. 5 Michigan defeated No. 2 UConn, 77–66 (Crisler Center, Ann Arbor, MI)
- Nov. 8
  - No. 2 UConn defeated No. 10 Iowa, 91–79 (Harry A. Gampel Pavilion, Storrs, CT)
- Nov. 15
  - No. 1 South Carolina defeated No. 3 USC, 89–85 (The Real SC – Bon Secours Wellness Arena, Greenville, SC)
  - No. 10т Iowa defeated No. 8 Vanderbilt, 75–65 (Bad Boy Mowers Series – Tyson Events Center, Sioux City, IA)
  - No. 7 Louisville defeated No. 4 UConn, 69–51 (KFC Yum! Center, Louisville, KY)

== Regular season ==
=== Upsets ===
An upset is a victory by an underdog team. In the context of NCAA Division I women's basketball, this generally constitutes an unranked team defeating a team currently ranked in the top 25. This list will highlight those upsets of ranked teams by unranked teams as well as upsets of No. 1 teams. Rankings are from the AP poll.

Winner	Score	Loser	Date	Tournament/event	Notes
Tulsa	64–62^{OT}	No. 19т Oklahoma State	November 12, 2026		First win over an AP Top 25-ranked team in program history

==== Non-Division I teams over Division I teams ====
In addition to the above-listed upsets in which an unranked team defeated a ranked team,

Bold type indicates winning teams in "true road-games"–i.e., those played on an opponent's home court (including secondary homes). Italics type indicates winning teams in an early season tournament (or event) Early season tournaments are tournaments played in the early season. Events are the tournaments with the same teams in it every year (even rivalry games).

Winner	Score	Loser	Date	Tournament/event	Notes
**Virginia State** (Division II)	63–62	Norfolk State	November 2, 2026		
**Talladega** (NAIA)	59–53	Alabama A&M	November 2, 2026		
**Minnesota Crookston** (Division II)	81–68	North Dakota	November 2, 2026		
**Illinois–Springfield** (Division II)	81–68	Southern Illinois	November 3, 2026		
**Frostburg State** (Division II)	94–92 ^{2OT}	Towson	November 5, 2026		
**Emory & Henry** (Division II)	76–68	Longwood	November 16, 2026		

=== Conference and tournament winners ===
Each of the 32 Division I athletic conferences will end its regular season with a single elimination tournament. The team with the best regular-season record in each conference receives the number one seed in each tournament, with tiebreakers used as needed in the case of ties for the top seeding. Unless otherwise noticed, the winners of these tournaments will receive automatic invitations to the 2027 NCAA Division I women's basketball tournament.

Conference	Regular season first place	Conference player of the year	Conference coach of the year	Conference tournament	Tournament venue (city)	Tournament winner
America East Conference				2027 America East Conference women's basketball tournament	Campus sites	
American Conference				2027 American Conference women's basketball tournament	Yuengling Center (Tampa, FL)	
Atlantic 10 Conference				2027 Atlantic 10 Conference women's basketball tournament	Henrico Sports & Events Center (Henrico, VA)	
Atlantic Coast Conference				2027 ACC women's basketball tournament	Spectrum Center (Charlotte, NC)	
Atlantic Sun Conference				2027 Atlantic Sun Conference women's basketball tournament	VyStar Veterans Memorial Arena (Jacksonville, FL)	
Big 12 Conference				2027 Big 12 Conference women's basketball tournament	T-Mobile Center (Kansas City, MO)	
Big East Conference				2027 Big East Conference women's basketball tournament	Mohegan Sun Arena (Uncasville, CT)	
Big Sky Conference				2027 Big Sky Conference women's basketball tournament	Idaho Central Arena (Boise, ID)	
Big South Conference				2027 Big South Conference women's basketball tournament	Freedom Hall Civic Center (Johnson City, TN)	
Big Ten Conference				2027 Big Ten Conference women's basketball tournament	T-Mobile Arena (Paradise, NV)	
Big West Conference				2027 Big West Conference women's basketball tournament	Lee's Family Forum (Henderson, NV)	
Coastal Athletic Association				2027 CAA women's basketball conference	CareFirst Arena (Washington, D.C.)	
Conference USA				2027 Conference USA women's basketball tournament	Propst Arena (Huntsville, AL)	
Horizon League				2027 Horizon League women's basketball tournament	Quarterfinals: Campus sites Semifinals and final: Riverview Health Arena (Noblesville, IN)	
Ivy League				2027 Ivy League women's basketball tournament	Leede Arena (Hanover, NH)	
Metro Conference				2027 Metro Conference women's basketball tournament	Boardwalk Hall (Atlantic City, NJ)	
Mid-American Conference				2027 Mid-American Conference men's basketball tournament	Rocket Arena (Cleveland, OH)	
Mid-Eastern Athletic Conference				2027 MEAC women's basketball tournament	Norfolk Scope (Norfolk, VA)	
Missouri Valley Conference				2027 Missouri Valley Conference women's basketball tournament	Enterprise Center (St. Louis, MO)	
Mountain West Conference				2027 Mountain West Conference women's basketball tournament	Thomas & Mack Center (Paradise, NV)	
Northeast Conference				2027 NEC women's basketball tournament	Campus sites	
Ohio Valley Conference				2027 Ohio Valley Conference women's basketball tournament	Ford Center (Evansville, IN)	
Pac-12 Conference				2027 Pac-12 Conference women's basketball tournament	MGM Grand Garden Arena (Paradise, NV)	
Patriot League				2027 Patriot League women's basketball tournament	Campus Sites	
Southeastern Conference				2027 SEC women's basketball tournament	Bon Secours Wellness Arena (Greenville, SC)	
Southern Conference				2027 Southern Conference women's basketball tournament	Harrah's Cherokee Center (Asheville, NC)	
Southland Conference				2027 Southland Conference women's basketball tournament	Townsley Law Arena (Lake Charles, LA)	
Southwestern Athletic Conference				2027 Southwestern Athletic Conference women's basketball tournament	Gateway Center Arena (College Park, GA)	
Summit League				2027 Summit League women's basketball tournament	Denny Sanford Premier Center (Sioux Falls, SD)	
Sun Belt Conference				2027 Sun Belt Conference women's basketball tournament	Pensacola Bay Center (Pensacola, FL)	
United Athletic Conference				2027 United Athletic Conference women's basketball tournament	Credit Union of Texas Event Center (Allen, TX)	
West Coast Conference				2027 West Coast Conference women's basketball tournament	Orleans Arena (Paradise, NV)	

== Conference standings ==
2026–27 America East Conference women's basketball standings
	Conf.				Overall
Team	W		L	PCT	W		L	PCT
Bryant	0	–	0	–	5	–	0	1.000
NJIT	0	–	0	–	5	–	1	.833
Maine	0	–	0	–	4	–	1	.800
Albany	0	–	0	–	4	–	2	.667
New Hampshire	0	–	0	–	4	–	2	.667
UMBC	0	–	0	–	4	–	2	.667
Vermont	0	–	0	–	4	–	2	.667
Binghamton	0	–	0	–	3	–	3	.500
UMass Lowell	0	–	0	–	2	–	4	.333
† 2027 America East tournament winner As of November 21, 2026

2026–27 American Conference women's basketball standings
	Conf.				Overall
Team	W		L	PCT	W		L	PCT
Memphis	0	–	0	–	5	–	0	1.000
Rice	0	–	0	–	5	–	0	1.000
South Florida	0	–	0	–	5	–	1	.833
North Texas	0	–	0	–	4	–	1	.800
Tulsa	0	–	0	–	4	–	1	.800
Temple	0	–	0	–	3	–	1	.750
Tulane	0	–	0	–	3	–	1	.750
UAB	0	–	0	–	3	–	1	.750
Charlotte	0	–	0	–	2	–	2	.500
UTSA	0	–	0	–	2	–	2	.500
Wichita State	0	–	0	–	2	–	3	.400
Florida Atlantic	0	–	0	–	2	–	4	.333
East Carolina	0	–	0	–	1	–	3	.250
† 2027 American tournament winner As of November 21, 2026

2026–27 Atlantic 10 women's basketball standings
	Conf.				Overall
Team	W		L	PCT	W		L	PCT
Fordham	0	–	0	–	5	–	2	.714
Duquesne	0	–	0	–	4	–	1	.800
Richmond	0	–	0	–	4	–	2	.667
Saint Joseph's	0	–	0	–	3	–	1	.750
St. Bonaventure	0	–	0	–	3	–	1	.750
George Washington	0	–	0	–	3	–	2	.600
George Mason	0	–	0	–	3	–	3	.500
Rhode Island	0	–	0	–	3	–	3	.500
VCU	0	–	0	–	2	–	2	.500
Davidson	0	–	0	–	2	–	3	.400
La Salle	0	–	0	–	2	–	3	.400
Loyola Chicago	0	–	0	–	2	–	3	.400
Saint Louis	0	–	0	–	2	–	3	.400
Dayton	0	–	0	–	1	–	2	.333
† 2027 A10 tournament winner As of November 21, 2026

2026–27 ACC women's basketball standings
	Conf.				Overall
Team	W		L	PCT	W		L	PCT
No. 3 Louisville	0	–	0	–	7	–	0	1.000
Florida State	0	–	0	–	6	–	0	1.000
Miami (FL)	0	–	0	–	6	–	0	1.000
Virginia	0	–	0	–	6	–	0	1.000
California	0	–	0	–	5	–	0	1.000
No. 5 Duke	0	–	0	–	5	–	0	1.000
No. 13 Notre Dame	0	–	0	–	5	–	0	1.000
Pittsburgh	0	–	0	–	5	–	0	1.000
Virginia Tech	0	–	0	–	5	–	0	1.000
Clemson	0	–	0	–	5	–	1	.833
Georgia Tech	0	–	0	–	5	–	1	.833
NC State	0	–	0	–	5	–	1	.833
SMU	0	–	0	–	5	–	1	.833
Stanford	0	–	0	–	4	–	1	.800
Syracuse	0	–	0	–	4	–	1	.800
Wake Forest	0	–	0	–	4	–	2	.667
Boston College	0	–	0	–	3	–	2	.600
No. 24 North Carolina	0	–	0	–	3	–	2	.600
† 2027 ACC tournament winner As of November 21, 2026; Rankings from AP Poll

2026–27 ASUN women's basketball standings
	Conf.				Overall
Team	W		L	PCT	W		L	PCT
North Florida	0	–	0	–	5	–	2	.714
Florida Gulf Coast	0	–	0	–	3	–	2	.600
West Florida*	0	–	0	–	3	–	3	.500
Jacksonville	0	–	0	–	2	–	2	.500
Lipscomb	0	–	0	–	2	–	3	.400
Queens	0	–	0	–	2	–	3	.400
Bellarmine	0	–	0	–	1	–	5	.167
Stetson	0	–	0	–	1	–	5	.167
† 2027 ASUN tournament winner * ineligible for the 2027 NCAA tournament due to transition from Division II; As of November 21, 2026

2026–27 Big 12 women's basketball standings
	Conf.				Overall
Team	W		L	PCT	W		L	PCT
No. 15 TCU	0	–	0	–	7	–	0	1.000
BYU	0	–	0	–	6	–	0	1.000
Iowa State	0	–	0	–	6	–	0	1.000
Arizona State	0	–	0	–	5	–	0	1.000
Baylor	0	–	0	–	5	–	0	1.000
Colorado	0	–	0	–	5	–	0	1.000
Houston	0	–	0	–	5	–	0	1.000
Utah	0	–	0	–	5	–	0	1.000
No. 22 West Virginia	0	–	0	–	5	–	0	1.000
UCF	0	–	0	–	6	–	1	.857
Kansas State	0	–	0	–	5	–	1	.833
No. 25 Oklahoma State	0	–	0	–	5	–	1	.833
Arizona	0	–	0	–	4	–	1	.800
Cincinnati	0	–	0	–	4	–	1	.800
Texas Tech	0	–	0	–	4	–	1	.800
Kansas	0	–	0	–	3	–	2	.600
† 2027 Big 12 tournament winner As of November 21, 2026; Rankings from AP poll

2026–27 Big East women's basketball standings
	Conf.				Overall
Team	W		L	PCT	W		L	PCT
Butler	0	–	0	–	6	–	0	1.000
Xavier	0	–	0	–	4	–	0	1.000
DePaul	0	–	0	–	5	–	1	.833
Creighton	0	–	0	–	4	–	1	.800
St. John's	0	–	0	–	4	–	1	.800
Georgetown	0	–	0	–	4	–	2	.667
Marquette	0	–	0	–	3	–	2	.600
No. 7 UConn	0	–	0	–	3	–	2	.600
Villanova	0	–	0	–	3	–	2	.600
Providence	0	–	0	–	2	–	3	.400
Seton Hall	0	–	0	–	2	–	3	.400
† 2027 Big East tournament winner As of November 21, 2026; Rankings from AP poll

2026–27 Big Sky women's basketball standings
	Conf.				Overall
Team	W		L	PCT	W		L	PCT
Weber State	0	–	0	–	4	–	1	.800
Northern Colorado	0	–	0	–	4	–	1	.800
Idaho State	0	–	0	–	4	–	2	.667
Idaho	0	–	0	–	3	–	1	.750
Montana State	0	–	0	–	2	–	1	.667
Southern Utah	0	–	0	–	3	–	2	.600
Utah Tech	0	–	0	–	3	–	2	.600
Eastern Washington	0	–	0	–	2	–	2	.500
Northern Arizona	0	–	0	–	1	–	3	.250
Montana	0	–	0	–	1	–	4	.200
Portland State	0	–	0	–	0	–	6	.000
† 2027 Big Sky tournament winner As of November 21, 2026

2026–27 Big South women's basketball standings
	Conf.				Overall
Team	W		L	PCT	W		L	PCT
High Point	0	–	0	–	6	–	1	.857
Winthrop	0	–	0	–	4	–	1	.800
USC Upstate	0	–	0	–	4	–	2	.667
Longwood	0	–	0	–	3	–	3	.500
Radford	0	–	0	–	3	–	3	.500
UNC Asheville	0	–	0	–	2	–	2	.500
Gardner–Webb	0	–	0	–	1	–	3	.250
Presbyterian	0	–	0	–	1	–	4	.200
Charleston Southern	0	–	0	–	0	–	5	.000
† 2027 Big South tournament winner As of November 21, 2026

2026–27 Big Ten women's basketball standings
	Conf.				Overall
Team	W		L	PCT	W		L	PCT
Indiana	0	–	0	–	6	–	0	1.000
Rutgers	0	–	0	–	6	–	0	1.000
No. 2 Michigan	0	–	0	–	5	–	0	1.000
Michigan State	0	–	0	–	5	–	0	1.000
No. 17 Minnesota	0	–	0	–	5	–	0	1.000
No. 23 Nebraska	0	–	0	–	5	–	0	1.000
No. 10 UCLA	0	–	0	–	5	–	0	1.000
No. 21 Illinois	0	–	0	–	4	–	0	1.000
No. 16 Washington	0	–	0	–	4	–	0	1.000
Oregon	0	–	0	–	6	–	1	.857
No. 8 Iowa	0	–	0	–	5	–	1	.833
No. 19т Ohio State	0	–	0	–	5	–	1	.833
Wisconsin	0	–	0	–	5	–	1	.833
Purdue	0	–	0	–	4	–	1	.800
No. 18 Maryland	0	–	0	–	3	–	1	.750
No. 4 USC	0	–	0	–	3	–	1	.750
Northwestern	0	–	0	–	2	–	4	.333
Penn State	0	–	0	–	1	–	4	.200
† 2027 Big Ten tournament winner As of November 21, 2026; Rankings from AP poll

2026–27 Big West Conference women's basketball standings
	Conf.				Overall
Team	W		L	PCT	W		L	PCT
California Baptist	0	–	0	–	4	–	0	1.000
Sacramento State	0	–	0	–	4	–	1	.800
UC Santa Barbara	0	–	0	–	4	–	1	.800
Cal Poly	0	–	0	–	3	–	2	.600
UC Irvine	0	–	0	–	2	–	1	.667
Utah Valley	0	–	0	–	2	–	1	.667
Cal State Fullerton	0	–	0	–	3	–	3	.500
Cal State Northridge	0	–	0	–	2	–	2	.500
UC San Diego	0	–	0	–	2	–	2	.500
Cal State Bakersfield	0	–	0	–	1	–	2	.333
UC Riverside	0	–	0	–	1	–	4	.200
Long Beach State	0	–	0	–	0	–	3	.000
† 2027 Big West tournament winner As of November 21, 2026

2026–27 CAA women's basketball standings
	Conf.				Overall
Team	W		L	PCT	W		L	PCT
Stony Brook	0	–	0	–	4	–	0	1.000
Monmouth	0	–	0	–	4	–	1	.800
UNC Wilmington	0	–	0	–	3	–	1	.750
Charleston	0	–	0	–	3	–	2	.600
Elon	0	–	0	–	3	–	2	.600
William & Mary	0	–	0	–	3	–	2	.600
Towson	0	–	0	–	3	–	3	.500
Hofstra	0	–	0	–	2	–	2	.500
Northeastern	0	–	0	–	2	–	2	.500
Drexel	0	–	0	–	2	–	3	.400
North Carolina A&T	0	–	0	–	2	–	3	.400
Hampton	0	–	0	–	1	–	4	.200
Campbell	0	–	0	–	1	–	5	.167
† 2027 CAA tournament winner As of November 21, 2026

2026–27 Conference USA women's basketball standings
	Conf.				Overall
Team	W		L	PCT	W		L	PCT
Missouri State	0	–	0	–	4	–	1	.800
Western Kentucky	0	–	0	–	3	–	1	.750
Kennesaw State	0	–	0	–	3	–	2	.600
Liberty	0	–	0	–	3	–	2	.600
New Mexico State	0	–	0	–	3	–	2	.600
Sam Houston	0	–	0	–	3	–	2	.600
Jacksonville State	0	–	0	–	2	–	2	.500
Middle Tennessee	0	–	0	–	2	–	2	.500
FIU	0	–	0	–	1	–	3	.250
Delaware	0	–	0	–	1	–	4	.200
† 2027 CUSA tournament winner As of November 21, 2026

2026–27 Horizon League women's basketball standings
	Conf.				Overall
Team	W		L	PCT	W		L	PCT
IU Indy	0	–	0	–	3	–	2	.600
Youngstown State	0	–	0	–	3	–	2	.600
Detroit Mercy	0	–	0	–	3	–	3	.500
Oakland	0	–	0	–	3	–	3	.500
Northern Illinois	0	–	0	–	2	–	2	.500
Robert Morris	0	–	0	–	2	–	2	.500
Green Bay	0	–	0	–	2	–	3	.400
Northern Kentucky	0	–	0	–	2	–	3	.400
Purdue Fort Wayne	0	–	0	–	2	–	3	.400
Milwaukee	0	–	0	–	2	–	4	.333
Cleveland State	0	–	0	–	1	–	3	.250
Wright State	0	–	0	–	1	–	4	.200
† 2027 Horizon League tournament winner As of November 21, 2026

2026–27 Ivy League women's basketball standings
	Conf.				Overall
Team	W		L	PCT	W		L	PCT
Princeton	0	–	0	–	6	–	1	.857
Penn	0	–	0	–	5	–	1	.833
Dartmouth	0	–	0	–	4	–	1	.800
Harvard	0	–	0	–	4	–	2	.667
Yale	0	–	0	–	4	–	2	.667
Columbia	0	–	0	–	3	–	2	.600
Cornell	0	–	0	–	3	–	2	.600
Brown	0	–	0	–	2	–	4	.333
† 2027 Ivy League tournament winner As of November 21, 2026

2026–27 Metro Conference women's basketball standings
	Conf.				Overall
Team	W		L	PCT	W		L	PCT
Fairfield	0	–	0	–	3	–	2	.600
Iona	0	–	0	–	3	–	3	.500
Manhattan	0	–	0	–	3	–	3	.500
Canisius	0	–	0	–	2	–	2	.500
Quinnipiac	0	–	0	–	3	–	4	.429
Siena	0	–	0	–	2	–	4	.333
Rider	0	–	0	–	1	–	3	.250
Saint Peter's	0	–	0	–	1	–	3	.250
Sacred Heart	0	–	0	–	1	–	4	.200
Marist	0	–	0	–	1	–	5	.167
Merrimack	0	–	0	–	0	–	6	.000
Mount St. Mary's	0	–	0	–	0	–	6	.000
Niagara	0	–	0	–	0	–	6	.000
† 2027 Metro Conference tournament winner As of November 21, 2026

2026–27 Mid-American Conference women's basketball standings
	Conf.				Overall
Team	W		L	PCT	W		L	PCT
Miami (OH)	0	–	0	–	5	–	0	1.000
Bowling Green	0	–	0	–	4	–	1	.800
Ohio	0	–	0	–	3	–	1	.750
Toledo	0	–	0	–	3	–	2	.600
UMass	0	–	0	–	3	–	2	.600
Buffalo	0	–	0	–	2	–	3	.400
Western Michigan	0	–	0	–	1	–	2	.333
Ball State	0	–	0	–	1	–	3	.250
Akron	0	–	0	–	1	–	4	.200
Central Michigan	0	–	0	–	0	–	4	.000
Kent State	0	–	0	–	0	–	4	.000
Eastern Michigan	0	–	0	–	0	–	5	.000
† 2027 MAC tournament winner As of November 21, 2026

2026–27 MEAC women's basketball standings
	Conf.				Overall
Team	W		L	PCT	W		L	PCT
Norfolk State	0	–	0	–	3	–	3	.500
Coppin State	0	–	0	–	2	–	3	.400
Delaware State	0	–	0	–	2	–	4	.333
Morgan State	0	–	0	–	2	–	5	.286
North Carolina Central	0	–	0	–	2	–	6	.250
Maryland Eastern Shore	0	–	0	–	1	–	4	.200
South Carolina State	0	–	0	–	1	–	4	.200
Howard	0	–	0	–	1	–	5	.167
† 2027 MEAC tournament winner As of November 21, 2026

2026–27 Missouri Valley Conference women's basketball standings
	Conf.				Overall
Team	W		L	PCT	W		L	PCT
Illinois State	0	–	0	–	6	–	0	1.000
UIC	0	–	0	–	3	–	2	.600
Indiana State	0	–	0	–	4	–	3	.571
Bradley	0	–	0	–	2	–	3	.400
Drake	0	–	0	–	2	–	3	.400
Murray State	0	–	0	–	2	–	3	.400
Southern Illinois	0	–	0	–	1	–	3	.250
Belmont	0	–	0	–	1	–	4	.200
Northern Iowa	0	–	0	–	1	–	4	.200
Valparaiso	0	–	0	–	1	–	4	.200
Evansville	0	–	0	–	0	–	5	.000
† 2027 MVC tournament winner As of November 21, 2026

2026–27 Mountain West Conference women's basketball standings
	Conf.				Overall
Team	W		L	PCT	W		L	PCT
UTEP	0	–	0	–	4	–	1	.800
Grand Canyon	0	–	0	–	3	–	1	.750
Air Force	0	–	0	–	2	–	3	.400
UC Davis	0	–	0	–	2	–	3	.400
Wyoming	0	–	0	–	2	–	3	.400
Hawai'i	0	–	0	–	1	–	3	.250
San Jose State	0	–	0	–	1	–	3	.250
UNLV	0	–	0	–	1	–	3	.250
Nevada	0	–	0	–	1	–	4	.200
New Mexico	0	–	0	–	1	–	4	.200
† 2027 Mountain West tournament winner As of November 21, 2026

2026–27 NEC women's basketball standings
	Conf.				Overall
Team	W		L	PCT	W		L	PCT
Fairleigh Dickinson	0	–	0	–	3	–	4	.429
Chicago State	0	–	0	–	2	–	4	.333
Central Connecticut	0	–	0	–	2	–	5	.286
New Haven**	0	–	0	–	1	–	3	.250
Wagner	0	–	0	–	1	–	3	.250
Le Moyne	0	–	0	–	1	–	4	.200
Mercyhurst*	0	–	0	–	1	–	5	.167
Stonehill	0	–	0	–	0	–	5	.000
LIU	0	–	0	–	0	–	6	.000
† 2027 NEC tournament winner * ineligible for the 2027 NCAA tournament due to transition from Division II ** ineligible for both the 2027 NEC tournament and the 2027 NCAA tournament due to transition from Division II; As of November 21, 2026

2026–27 Ohio Valley Conference women's basketball standings
	Conf.				Overall
Team	W		L	PCT	W		L	PCT
Western Illinois	0	–	0	–	4	–	1	.800
SIU Edwardsville	0	–	0	–	4	–	2	.667
Southern Indiana	0	–	0	–	3	–	3	.500
Tennessee State	0	–	0	–	2	–	3	.400
UT Martin	0	–	0	–	2	–	3	.400
Lindenwood	0	–	0	–	2	–	5	.286
Eastern Illinois	0	–	0	–	1	–	5	.167
Morehead State	0	–	0	–	1	–	5	.167
Southeast Missouri State	0	–	0	–	1	–	6	.143
† 2027 OVC tournament winner As of November 21, 2026

2026–27 Pac-12 Conference women's basketball standings
	Conf.				Overall
Team	W		L	PCT	W		L	PCT
Texas State	0	–	0	–	4	–	0	1.000
Boise State	0	–	0	–	4	–	1	.800
Fresno State	0	–	0	–	3	–	1	.750
Oregon State	0	–	0	–	3	–	2	.600
San Diego State	0	–	0	–	3	–	2	.600
Gonzaga	0	–	0	–	3	–	3	.500
Colorado State	0	–	0	–	2	–	2	.500
Washington State	0	–	0	–	2	–	3	.400
Utah State	0	–	0	–	2	–	4	.333
† 2027 Pac-12 Tournament winner As of November 21, 2026; Rankings from AP poll

2026–27 Patriot League women's basketball standings
	Conf.				Overall
Team	W		L	PCT	W		L	PCT
Army	0	–	0	–	5	–	1	.833
Holy Cross	0	–	0	–	3	–	2	.600
Navy	0	–	0	–	3	–	2	.600
Boston University	0	–	0	–	2	–	3	.400
Colgate	0	–	0	–	2	–	3	.400
Loyola	0	–	0	–	2	–	3	.400
Lehigh	0	–	0	–	1	–	3	.250
Bucknell	0	–	0	–	1	–	4	.200
Lafayette	0	–	0	–	1	–	4	.200
American	0	–	0	–	0	–	4	.000
† 2027 Patriot League tournament winner As of November 21, 2026

2026–27 SEC women's basketball standings
	Conf.				Overall
Team	W		L	PCT	W		L	PCT
No. 9 LSU	0	–	0	–	6	–	0	1.000
No. 14 Oklahoma	0	–	0	–	6	–	0	1.000
Tennessee	0	–	0	–	6	–	0	1.000
Arkansas	0	–	0	–	5	–	0	1.000
No. 12 Kentucky	0	–	0	–	5	–	0	1.000
Mississippi State	0	–	0	–	5	–	0	1.000
Missouri	0	–	0	–	5	–	0	1.000
No. 1 South Carolina	0	–	0	–	5	–	0	1.000
No. 6 Texas	0	–	0	–	5	–	0	1.000
Texas A&M	0	–	0	–	5	–	0	1.000
Alabama	0	–	0	–	6	–	1	.857
Georgia	0	–	0	–	5	–	1	.833
No. 11 Vanderbilt	0	–	0	–	5	–	1	.833
Auburn	0	–	0	–	4	–	1	.800
No. 19т Ole Miss	0	–	0	–	4	–	1	.800
Florida	0	–	0	–	4	–	2	.667
† 2027 SEC tournament winner As of November 21, 2026; Rankings from AP poll

2026–27 Southern Conference women's basketball standings
	Conf.				Overall
Team	W		L	PCT	W		L	PCT
East Tennessee State	0	–	0	–	5	–	1	.833
Western Carolina	0	–	0	–	5	–	1	.833
Chattanooga	0	–	0	–	4	–	2	.667
UNC Greensboro	0	–	0	–	4	–	2	.667
Mercer	0	–	0	–	3	–	2	.600
Samford	0	–	0	–	3	–	3	.500
Wofford	0	–	0	–	3	–	3	.500
Furman	0	–	0	–	2	–	3	.400
Tennessee Tech	0	–	0	–	1	–	3	.250
† 2027 SoCon tournament winner As of November 21, 2026

2026–27 Southland Conference women's basketball standings
	Conf.				Overall
Team	W		L	PCT	W		L	PCT
Stephen F. Austin	0	–	0	–	2	–	1	.667
Nicholls	0	–	0	–	3	–	3	.500
McNeese	0	–	0	–	3	–	4	.429
Lamar	0	–	0	–	2	–	3	.400
Southeastern Louisiana	0	–	0	–	2	–	3	.400
East Texas A&M	0	–	0	–	2	–	4	.333
Northwestern State	0	–	0	–	2	–	4	.333
Texas A&M–Corpus Christi	0	–	0	–	1	–	3	.250
Incarnate Word	0	–	0	–	1	–	4	.200
UT Rio Grande Valley	0	–	0	–	1	–	4	.200
Houston Christian	0	–	0	–	1	–	5	.167
LSU New Orleans	0	–	0	–	0	–	5	.000
† 2027 Southland tournament winner As of November 21, 2026

2026–27 SWAC women's basketball standings
	Conf.				Overall
Team	W		L	PCT	W		L	PCT
Prairie View A&M	0	–	0	–	2	–	1	.667
Alabama A&M	0	–	0	–	2	–	4	.333
Arkansas–Pine Bluff	0	–	0	–	2	–	4	.333
Bethune–Cookman	0	–	0	–	2	–	4	.333
Alcorn State	0	–	0	–	1	–	2	.333
Alabama State	0	–	0	–	1	–	4	.200
Florida A&M	0	–	0	–	1	–	4	.200
Grambling State	0	–	0	–	1	–	4	.200
Jackson State	0	–	0	–	1	–	4	.200
Southern	0	–	0	–	1	–	4	.200
Mississippi Valley State	0	–	0	–	0	–	5	.000
Texas Southern	0	–	0	–	0	–	5	.000
† 2027 SWAC tournament winner As of November 21, 2026

2026–27 Summit League women's basketball standings
	Conf.				Overall
Team	W		L	PCT	W		L	PCT
South Dakota	0	–	0	–	4	–	1	.800
St. Thomas	0	–	0	–	3	–	2	.600
Kansas City	0	–	0	–	3	–	3	.500
North Dakota State	0	–	0	–	2	–	3	.400
Omaha	0	–	0	–	2	–	3	.400
South Dakota State	0	–	0	–	2	–	3	.400
Oral Roberts	0	–	0	–	2	–	4	.333
North Dakota	0	–	0	–	1	–	3	.250
† 2027 Summit League tournament winner As of November 21, 2026

2026–27 Sun Belt Conference women's basketball standings
	Conf.				Overall
Team	W		L	PCT	W		L	PCT
Louisiana Tech	0	–	0	–	5	–	1	.833
Marshall	0	–	0	–	5	–	1	.833
Southern Miss	0	–	0	–	5	–	1	.833
Appalachian State	0	–	0	–	4	–	1	.800
Coastal Carolina	0	–	0	–	3	–	2	.600
Georgia Southern	0	–	0	–	3	–	2	.600
James Madison	0	–	0	–	3	–	3	.500
Old Dominion	0	–	0	–	3	–	3	.500
Louisiana	0	–	0	–	2	–	3	.400
Troy	0	–	0	–	2	–	4	.333
Arkansas State	0	–	0	–	1	–	3	.250
Georgia State	0	–	0	–	1	–	4	.200
Louisiana–Monroe	0	–	0	–	1	–	4	.200
South Alabama	0	–	0	–	1	–	5	.167
† 2027 Sun Belt tournament winner As of November 21, 2026

2026–27 United Athletic Conference women's basketball standings
	Conf.				Overall
Team	W		L	PCT	W		L	PCT
Eastern Kentucky	0	–	0	–	5	–	1	.833
Abilene Christian	0	–	0	–	4	–	1	.800
West Georgia*	0	–	0	–	4	–	1	.800
Austin Peay	0	–	0	–	2	–	2	.500
North Alabama	0	–	0	–	2	–	2	.500
Central Arkansas	0	–	0	–	2	–	3	.400
Tarleton State	0	–	0	–	2	–	3	.400
UT Arlington	0	–	0	–	2	–	3	.400
Little Rock	0	–	0	–	1	–	4	.200
† 2027 UAC tournament winner * ineligible for the 2027 NCAA tournament due to transition from Division II; As of November 21, 2026

2026–27 West Coast Conference women's basketball standings
	Conf.				Overall
Team	W		L	PCT	W		L	PCT
Loyola Marymount	0	–	0	–	5	–	0	1.000
San Francisco	0	–	0	–	4	–	1	.800
Santa Clara	0	–	0	–	4	–	1	.800
Pepperdine	0	–	0	–	3	–	2	.600
Portland	0	–	0	–	3	–	2	.600
San Diego	0	–	0	–	3	–	2	.600
Seattle	0	–	0	–	3	–	2	.600
Pacific	0	–	0	–	2	–	2	.500
Saint Mary's	0	–	0	–	2	–	3	.400
Denver	0	–	0	–	2	–	4	.333
† 2027 WCC tournament winner As of November 21, 2026

== Postseason tournament ==
The NCAA tournament will tip off on March 15, 2027, with the Opening Round and conclude on April 14 at Nationwide Arena in Columbus, Ohio. A total of 76 teams will enter the tournament. Thirty-two of those teams will earn automatic bids by winning their respective conferences tournaments. The remaining 44 teams will be granted "at-large" bids which were extended by the NCAA Selection Committee.

=== Final Four – Nationwide Arena in Columbus, Ohio ===
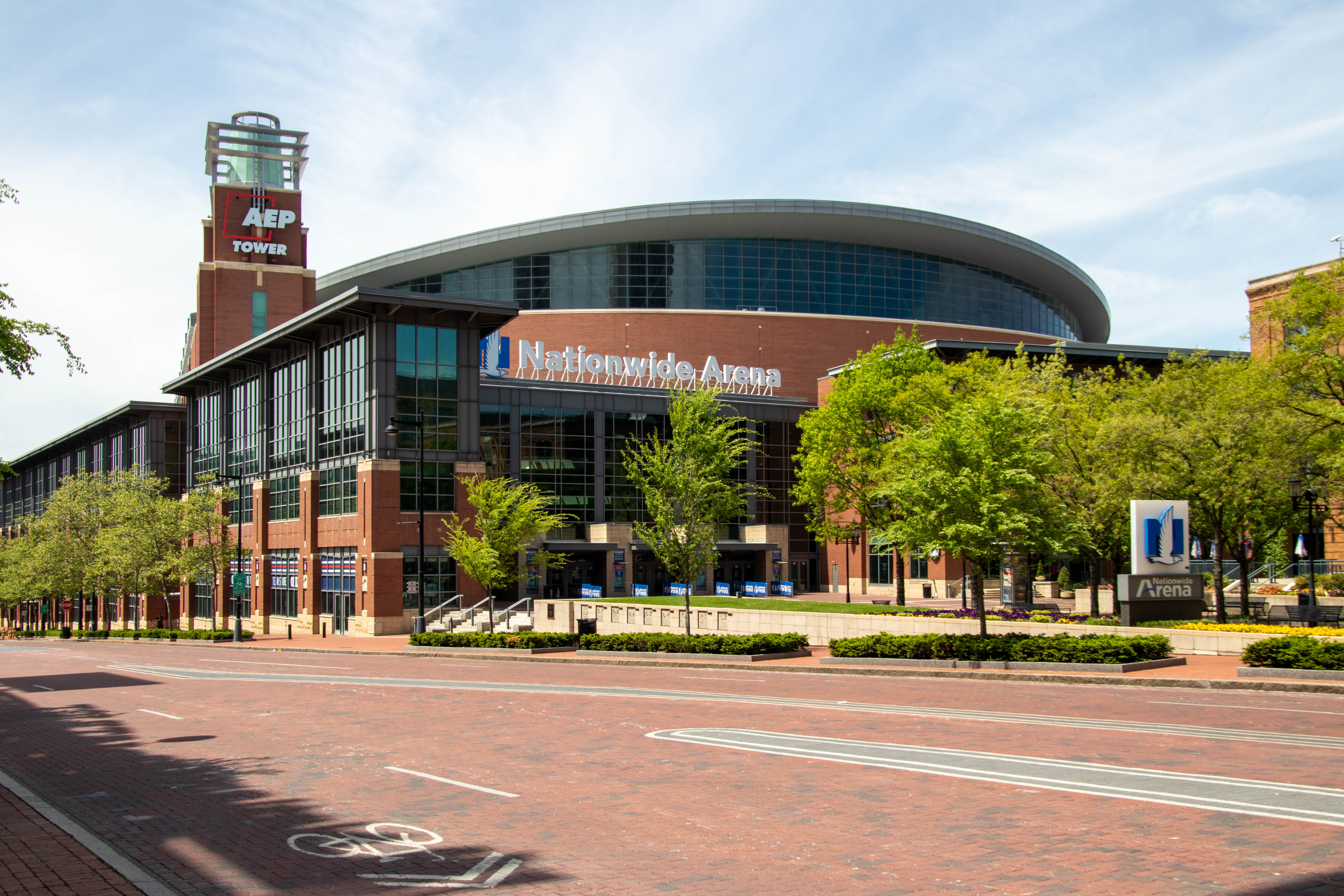
Nationwide Arena in Columbus, Ohio will host the women's Final Four.

Semifinals
1
4
3
2

Finals

=== Tournament upsets ===
Per the NCAA, an upset occurs when the losing team in an NCAA tournament game was seeded at least two seed lines better than the winning team.

=== Women's Basketball Invitation Tournament ===
Once the NCAA tournament field is announced, the Women's Basketball Invitation Tournament will invite 32 teams to participate. The first three rounds will be played on campus sites, with the semifinals and final taking place at a site to be determined.

=== Women's National Invitation Tournament ===
After the NCAA tournament and WBIT fields are announced, the Women's National Invitation Tournament will invite 48 teams to participate. WNIT participants and sites will be announced when the field is set on March 15.

== Coaching changes ==
Many teams will change coaches during the season and after it ends.

Team	Former	Interim	New	Reason
Iowa State	Bill Fennelly			Fennelly announced on October 12, 2026, that he will retire at the end of the season after 32 seasons at Iowa State.

== Attendances ==
The Top 30 NCAA Division I women's basketball teams by average home attendance

== Television viewers and ratings ==
=== Most watched regular-season games ===
Rank	Game	Date	Time (ET)	Matchup	Network	Viewers (millions)	TV rating
TBD	TBD	TBD	TBD				

=== Most watched conference tournament games ===
Rank	Tournament	Date	time (ET)	Matchup	Network	Viewers (millions)	TV rating
TBD	ACC tournament	TBD					
TBD	Big 12 tournament	TBD					
TBD	Big East tournament	TBD					
TBD	SEC tournament	TBD					
TBD	Big Ten tournament	TBD					

==== Most watched other-conference tournament games ====
Rank	Tournament	Date	time (ET)	Matchup	Network	Viewers (millions)	TV rating
TBD	MVC tournament	TBD					
TBD	Big South tournament	TBD					
TBD	Atlantic Sun tournament	TBD					
TBD	Summit League tournament	TBD					
TBD	Sun Belt tournament	TBD					
TBD	Southern tournament	TBD					
TBD	CAA tournament	TBD					
TBD	NEC tournament	TBD					
TBD	Horizon League tournament	TBD					
TBD	Metro tournament	TBD					
TBD	WCC tournament	TBD					
TBD	Southland tournament	TBD					
TBD	Patriot League tournament	TBD					
TBD	Big Sky tournament	TBD					
TBD	America East tournament	TBD					
TBD	MEAC tournament	TBD					
TBD	Mountain West tournament	TBD					
TBD	SWAC tournament	TBD					
TBD	MAC tournament	TBD					
TBD	CUSA tournament	TBD					
TBD	Big West tournament	TBD					
TBD	UAC tournament	TBD					
TBD	Ivy League tournament	TBD					
TBD	Atlantic 10 tournament	TBD					
TBD	American tournament	TBD					
TBD	Pac-12 tournament	TBD					

=== Most watched tournament games ===
(#) Tournament seedings and region in parentheses.

Rank	Round	Date and time (ET)	Matchup	Network	Viewers (millions)	TV rating
TBD						

== See also ==
- 2026–27 NCAA Division I men's basketball season
