= 2026–27 Texas Longhorns women's basketball team =

American basketball team season

2026–27 Texas Longhorns women's basketball
- Conference: Southeastern Conference

Ranking
- Coaches: No. 6
- AP: No. 6
- Record: 5–0 (0–0 SEC)
- Head coach: Vic Schaefer (7th season)
- Associate head coach: Elena Lovato (5th season)
- Assistant coaches: Lindsay Wisdom-Hylton (5th season); Blair Schaefer (7th season); Mason Wright (2nd season)
- Home arena: Moody Center

2026–27 SEC women's basketball standings
| | Conf. | | | | Overall |
| Team | W | | L | PCT | W | | L | PCT |
|---|---|---|---|---|---|---|---|---|
| Arkansas | 0 | – | 0 | – | 5 | – | 0 | 1.000 |
| Georgia | 0 | – | 0 | – | 5 | – | 0 | 1.000 |
| No. 12 Kentucky | 0 | – | 0 | – | 5 | – | 0 | 1.000 |
| No. 9 LSU | 0 | – | 0 | – | 5 | – | 0 | 1.000 |
| Mississippi State | 0 | – | 0 | – | 5 | – | 0 | 1.000 |
| Missouri | 0 | – | 0 | – | 5 | – | 0 | 1.000 |
| No. 14 Oklahoma | 0 | – | 0 | – | 5 | – | 0 | 1.000 |
| No. 1 South Carolina | 0 | – | 0 | – | 5 | – | 0 | 1.000 |
| Tennessee | 0 | – | 0 | – | 5 | – | 0 | 1.000 |
| No. 19т Ole Miss | 0 | – | 0 | – | 4 | – | 0 | 1.000 |
| No. 6 Texas | 0 | – | 0 | – | 4 | – | 0 | 1.000 |
| Texas A&M | 0 | – | 0 | – | 4 | – | 0 | 1.000 |
| Alabama | 0 | – | 0 | – | 5 | – | 1 | .833 |
| Auburn | 0 | – | 0 | – | 4 | – | 1 | .800 |
| No. 11 Vanderbilt | 0 | – | 0 | – | 4 | – | 1 | .800 |
| Florida | 0 | – | 0 | – | 3 | – | 2 | .600 |
† 2027 SEC tournament winner As of November 19, 2026; Rankings from AP poll

The 2026–27 Texas Longhorns women's basketball team will represent the University of Texas at Austin during the 2026–27 NCAA Division I women's basketball season. The team will be coached by seventh-year head coach Vic Schaefer, and will play their home games at the Moody Center in Austin, Texas, as a member of the Southeastern Conference.

== Previous season ==
The Longhorns finished the 2025–26 season 35–4 overall and 13–3 in SEC play, to finish in a tie for second place with Vanderbilt. As the No. 3 seed in the SEC tournament, they defeated No. 11 Alabama and No. 7 Ole Miss in the quarterfinals and semifinals respectively, before beating top-seeded and three-consecutive champions South Carolina in the championship game to win the SEC title for the first time, earning the conference's automatic bid to the NCAA tournament.

For the second consecutive year, the Longhorns were the No. 1 seed, this time in the Fort Worth #3 Regional. They defeated No. 16 Missouri State and No. 8 Oregon in the first and second rounds, as well as No. 5 Kentucky in the Sweet Sixteen and No. 2 TCU in the Elite Eight to capture the regional title. They advanced to the Final Four for the second straight year, making it the first time since 1987 that they had made it to back-to-back Final Fours. They lost to eventual national champion UCLA 44–51 to end their season.

== Offseason ==
=== Departures ===
Texas departures
| Name | Num | Pos. | Height | Year | Hometown | Reason for departure |
|---|---|---|---|---|---|---|
| Kyla Oldacre | 00 | Center | 6'6" | Senior | Mason, OH | Graduated; undrafted in the 2026 WNBA draft, signed a training camp contract with the Dallas Wings |
| Rori Harmon | 3 | Guard | 5'6" | Graduate student | Houston, TX | Graduated; selected 34th overall by the Washington Mystics in the 2026 WNBA draft |
| Jordan Lee | 7 | Guard | 6'0" | Sophomore | Stockton, CA | Transferred to South Carolina |
| Justice Carlton | 11 | Forward | 6'1" | Sophomore | Katy, TX | Transferred to Houston |
| Ashton Judd | 21 | Guard | 6'1" | Senior | West Plains, MO | Graduated |
| Aaliyah Crump | 23 | Guard | 6'1" | Freshman | Shakopee, MN | Transferred to Duke |
| Teya Sidberry | 32 | Forward | 6'1" | Senior | Salt Lake City, UT | Graduated |

=== Incoming transfers ===
Texas incoming transfers
| Name | Num | Pos. | Height | Year | Hometown | Previous school |
|---|---|---|---|---|---|---|
| Zya Vann | 9 | Guard | 5'9" | Junior | Edmond, OK | Oklahoma |
| Jada Bediako | 14 | Forward | 6'3" | Senior | Brampton, ON | Marquette |

=== Recruiting class ===
College recruiting
| Name | Hometown | School | Height | Weight | Commit date |
|---|---|---|---|---|---|
| Addison Bjorn; W | Riverside, MO | Park Hill South High School | 6 ft 1 in (1.85 m) | N/A | |
| Addison Bjorn; W | Recruit ratings: Rivals: 247Sports: ESPN: (97) | | | | |
| Brihanna Crittendon; W | Thornton, CO | Riverdale Ridge High School | 6 ft 3 in (1.91 m) | N/A | |
| Brihanna Crittendon; W | Recruit ratings: Rivals: 247Sports: ESPN: (97) | | | | |
| Aaliah Spaight; PG | Las Vegas, NV | Bishop Gorman High School | 5 ft 7 in (1.70 m) | N/A | |
| Aaliah Spaight; PG | Recruit ratings: Rivals: 247Sports: ESPN: (96) | | | | |
| Joyce-Isi Etute; F | Bradenton, FL | IMG Academy | 6 ft 2 in (1.88 m) | N/A | |
| Joyce-Isi Etute; F | Recruit ratings: Rivals: 247Sports: ESPN: (96) | | | | |
| Amalia Holguin; G | Newport Beach, CA | Sage Hill High School | 5 ft 9 in (1.75 m) | N/A | |
| Amalia Holguin; G | Recruit ratings: 247Sports: ESPN: (94) | | | | |
Overall recruit ranking: ESPN: 3
Note: In many cases, Scout, Rivals, 247Sports, On3, and ESPN may conflict in their listings of height and weight.; In these cases, the average was taken. ESPN grades are on a 100-point scale.; Sources: "2026 Player Commits". ESPN. Archived from the original on July 24, 2026.

==== 2027 recruiting class ====
College recruiting (2027)
| Name | Hometown | School | Height | Weight | Commit date |
|---|---|---|---|---|---|
| Jayla Forbes; P | Alabaster, AL | Montverde Academy | 6 ft 7 in (2.01 m) | N/A | |
| Jayla Forbes; P | Recruit ratings: 247Sports: ESPN: (96) | | | | |
Overall recruit ranking:
Note: In many cases, Scout, Rivals, 247Sports, On3, and ESPN may conflict in their listings of height and weight.; In these cases, the average was taken. ESPN grades are on a 100-point scale.; Sources: "2027 Player Commits". ESPN. Archived from the original on July 24, 2026.

== Preseason ==
On October 12, 2026, the SEC released its annual preseason media poll and awards. Texas was picked to finish second in the conference.

=== Preseason rankings ===
SEC Preseason Poll
| Place | Team |
|---|---|
| 1 | South Carolina |
| 2 | Texas |
| 3 | LSU |
| 4 | Vanderbilt |
| 5 | Kentucky |
| 6 | Oklahoma |
| 7 | Ole Miss |
| 8 | Tennessee |
| 9 | Mississippi State |
| 10 | Alabama |
| 11 | Texas A&M |
| 12 | Florida |
| 13 | Georgia |
| 14 | Missouri |
| 15 | Auburn |
| 16 | Arkansas |

=== Preseason All-SEC Teams ===
Preseason All-SEC Teams
| Player | Year | Position | Team |
|---|---|---|---|
| Madison Booker | Senior | Forward | First |

== Roster ==
2026–27 Texas Longhorns women's basketball team
Players
Coaches

| Pos. | # | Name | Height | Year | Previous school | Hometown |
|---|---|---|---|---|---|---|
| G | 1 | Bryanna Preston | 5 ft 9 in (1.75 m) | Jr | Wesleyan School | Jonesboro, GA |
| G | 2 | Amalia Holguin | 5 ft 9 in (1.75 m) | Fr | Sage Hill School | Newport Beach, CA |
| F | 3 | Brihanna Crittendon | 6 ft 3 in (1.91 m) | Fr | Riverdale Ridge High School | Thornton, CO |
| G | 4 | Addison Bjorn | 6 ft 2 in (1.88 m) | Fr | Park Hill South High School | Parkville, MO |
| G | 6 | Sarah Graves (W) | 5 ft 9 in (1.75 m) | GS | Keller High School | Keller, TX |
| G | 8 | Grace Prenter | 5 ft 8 in (1.73 m) | So | Mount Anville Secondary School | Dublin, Ireland |
| G | 9 | Zya Vann | 5 ft 9 in (1.75 m) | Jr | Bethany High School; Oklahoma | Edmond, OK |
| G | 10 | Lizzy Spaight | 5 ft 7 in (1.7 m) | Fr | Bishop Gorman High School | Las Vegas, NV |
| F | 14 | Jada Bediako | 6 ft 3 in (1.91 m) | Sr | Southwest Academy; Marquette | Brampton, ON |
| C | 16 | Lovisa Asbrink Hose | 6 ft 6 in (1.98 m) | Jr | Luleå gymnasieskola Florida Atlantic | Stockholm, Sweden |
| F | 25 | Breya Cunningham | 6 ft 4 in (1.93 m) | Sr | La Jolla Country Day School; Arizona | Chula Vista, CA |
| F | 34 | Isi Etute | 6 ft 2 in (1.88 m) | Fr | IMG Academy | Dudelange, Luxembourg |
| F | 35 | Madison Booker | 6 ft 1 in (1.85 m) | Sr | Germantown High School | Ridgeland, MS |

Head coach

- Vic Schaefer (Texas A&M)

Assistant coach(es)

- Elena Lovato (Pittsburg State)
- Lindsay Wisdom-Hylton (Purdue)
- Blair Schaefer (Mississippi State)
- Mason Wright (Texas)

Legend

- (C) Team captain
- (S) Suspended
- (I) Ineligible
- (W) Walk-on
- Injured
- Current redshirt

Roster

== Schedule and results ==
| Date time, TV | Rank^{#} | Opponent^{#} | Result | Record | High points | High rebounds | High assists | Site (attendance) city, state |
Exhibition
| October 19, 2026*; 6:00 p.m., UConn+ | | at UConn | L 61–83 | | 23 – Booker | 6 – Tied | 3 – Spaight | PeoplesBank Arena (10,367); Hartford, CT |
| October 25, 2026*; 1:00 p.m. | No. 6 | vs. No. 11 UCLA | W 81–64 | | 21 – Booker | 7 – Booker | 6 – Booker | H-E-B Center; Cedar Park, TX |
| October 29, 2026*; 7:00 p.m. | No. 6 | Baylor | W 85–64 | | 18 – Vann | 4 – Cunningham | 4 – Tied | Moody Center; Austin, TX |
Non-conference regular season
| November 4, 2026*; 7:00 p.m., SECN+/ESPN+ | No. 6 | Fairleigh Dickinson | W 85–65 | 1–0 | 24 – Booker | 13 – Cunningham | 5 – Booker | Moody Center (9,688); Austin, TX |
| November 7, 2026*; 7:00 p.m., SECN+/ESPN+ | No. 6 | Northern Colorado | W 91–29 | 2–0 | 30 – Booker | 6 – Cunningham | 6 – Booker | Moody Center (9,306); Austin, TX |
| November 11, 2026*; 6:00 p.m., SECN | No. 6 | South Dakota State | W 93–63 | 3–0 | 24 – Clark | 6 – Cunningham | 5 – Preston | Moody Center (9,700); Austin, TX |
| November 14, 2026*; 12:00 p.m., SECN+/ESPN+ | No. 6 | Tarleton State | W 91–35 | 4–0 | 16 – Crittendon | 6 – Etute | 5 – Spaight | Moody Center (9,416); Austin, TX |
| November 18, 2026*; 6:30 p.m., ESPN+ | No. 6 | at Green Bay | W 89–57 | 5–0 | 23 – Clark | 12 – Cunningham | 11 – Preston | Kress Events Center (3,003); Green Bay, WI |
| November 22, 2026*; 12:00 p.m., ESPN | No. 6 | vs. No. 19т Ohio State; Wild Horse Sports Lone Star Series | | | | | | Dickies Arena; Fort Worth, TX |
| November 25, 2026*; 6:00 p.m., SECN | | Southeastern Louisiana | | | | | | Moody Center; Austin, TX |
| November 29, 2026*; 2:00 p.m., ESPN+ | | at Southeast Missouri State | | | | | | Show Me Center; Cape Girardeau, MO |
| December 2, 2026*; 8:15 p.m., ESPN2 | | Louisville; ACC–SEC Challenge | | | | | | Moody Center; Austin, TX |
| December 6, 2026*; 12:00 p.m., ESPN2 | | vs. TCU; Wild Horse Sports Lone Star Series | | | | | | Dickies Arena; Fort Worth, TX |
| December 10, 2026*; 7:00 p.m., SECN+/ESPN+ | | Arkansas State | | | | | | Moody Center; Austin, TX |
| December 13, 2026*; 2:00 p.m., SECN+/ESPN+ | | UT Rio Grande Valley | | | | | | Moody Center; Austin, TX |
| December 16, 2026*; 11:00 a.m., SECN+/ESPN+ | | Little Rock | | | | | | Moody Center; Austin, TX |
| December 19, 2026*; 5:00 p.m., ESPN2 | | vs. Duke; Players Era Women's Festival | | | | | | Michelob Ultra Arena; Paradise, NV |
| December 20, 2026*; 4:00 p.m., ESPN | | vs. UCLA; Players Era Women's Festival | | | | | | Michelob Ultra Arena; Paradise, NV |
| December 28, 2026*; 7:00 p.m., SECN+/ESPN+ | | Harvard | | | | | | Moody Center; Austin, TX |
SEC regular season
| December 31, 2026; 1:00 p.m., SECN+/ESPN+ | | at Georgia | | | | | | Stegeman Coliseum; Athens, GA |
| January 3, 2027; 2:00 p.m., ABC | | South Carolina | | | | | | Moody Center; Austin, TX |
| January 7, 2027; 6:00 p.m., ESPN2 | | Tennessee | | | | | | Moody Center; Austin, TX |
| January 10, 2027; 1:00 p.m., ABC | | at Kentucky | | | | | | Memorial Coliseum; Lexington, KY |
| January 14, 2027; 7:00 p.m., SECN+/ESPN+ | | Alabama | | | | | | Moody Center; Austin, TX |
| January 17, 2027; 12:00 p.m., ABC | | Vanderbilt | | | | | | Moody Center; Austin, TX |
| January 21, 2027; 8:00 p.m., SECN | | at Texas A&M; Lone Star Showdown | | | | | | Reed Arena; College Station, TX |
| January 24, 2027; 4:00 p.m., SECN | | at Mississippi State | | | | | | Humphrey Coliseum; Starkville, MS |
| January 28, 2027; 7:00 p.m., SECN+/ESPN+ | | Missouri | | | | | | Moody Center; Austin, TX |
| February 4, 2027; 6:00 p.m., SECN | | at Auburn | | | | | | Neville Arena; Auburn, AL |
| February 8, 2027; 6:30 p.m., SECN | | Arkansas | | | | | | Moody Center; Austin, TX |
| February 11, 2027; 6:00 p.m., ESPN | | at LSU | | | | | | Pete Maravich Assembly Center; Baton Rouge, LA |
| February 14, 2027; 3:00 p.m., SECN | | Texas A&M; Lone Star Showdown | | | | | | Moody Center; Austin, TX |
| February 21, 2027; 2:00 p.m., SECN | | Florida | | | | | | Moody Center; Austin, TX |
| February 25, 2027; 7:00 p.m., ESPN2 | | at Oklahoma | | | | | | Lloyd Noble Center; Norman, OK |
| February 28, 2027; 1:00 p.m., ESPN/ESPN2 | | at Ole Miss | | | | | | SJB Pavilion; Oxford, MS |
SEC tournament
| March 3–7, 2027; TBA | | vs. | | | | | | Bon Secours Wellness Arena; Greenville, SC |
*Non-conference game. ^{#}Rankings from AP Poll. (#) Tournament seedings in parentheses. All times are in Central.

== Rankings ==
Ranking movements
| | Week | | | | | | | | | | | | | | | | | | | | |
| Poll | Pre | 1 | 2 | 3 | 4 | 5 | 6 | 7 | 8 | 9 | 10 | 11 | 12 | 13 | 14 | 15 | 16 | 17 | 18 | 19 | Final |
|---|---|---|---|---|---|---|---|---|---|---|---|---|---|---|---|---|---|---|---|---|---|
| AP | 6 | 6 | 6 | | | | | | | | | | | | | | | | | | |
| Coaches | 6 | 6 | 6 | | | | | | | | | | | | | | | | | | |

== See also ==
- 2026–27 Texas Longhorns men's basketball team
