= 2026–27 South Carolina Gamecocks women's basketball team =

US college basketball team

2026–27 South Carolina Gamecocks women's basketball
- Conference: Southeastern Conference

Ranking
- Coaches: No. 1
- AP: No. 1
- Record: 6–0 (0–0 SEC)
- Head coach: Dawn Staley (19th season)
- Assistant coaches: Lisa Boyer; Jolette Law; Wendale Farrow; Mary Wooley; Khadijah Sessions
- Home arena: Colonial Life Arena

2026–27 SEC women's basketball standings
	Conf.				Overall
Team	W		L	PCT	W		L	PCT
No. 12 Kentucky	0	–	0	–	6	–	0	1.000
No. 9 LSU	0	–	0	–	6	–	0	1.000
No. 14 Oklahoma	0	–	0	–	6	–	0	1.000
Tennessee	0	–	0	–	6	–	0	1.000
Arkansas	0	–	0	–	5	–	0	1.000
Mississippi State	0	–	0	–	5	–	0	1.000
Missouri	0	–	0	–	5	–	0	1.000
No. 1 South Carolina	0	–	0	–	5	–	0	1.000
No. 6 Texas	0	–	0	–	5	–	0	1.000
Texas A&M	0	–	0	–	5	–	0	1.000
Alabama	0	–	0	–	6	–	1	.857
Auburn	0	–	0	–	5	–	1	.833
Georgia	0	–	0	–	5	–	1	.833
No. 11 Vanderbilt	0	–	0	–	5	–	1	.833
No. 19т Ole Miss	0	–	0	–	4	–	1	.800
Florida	0	–	0	–	4	–	2	.667
† 2027 SEC tournament winner As of November 21, 2026; Rankings from AP poll

The 2026–27 South Carolina Gamecocks women's basketball team currently represents the University of South Carolina during the 2026–27 NCAA Division I women's basketball season. The Gamecocks, led by nineteenth-year head coach Dawn Staley, play their home games at Colonial Life Arena in Columbia, South Carolina, and compete as a member of the Southeastern Conference (SEC).

== Previous season ==
The Gamecocks finished the 2025–26 season 36–4 overall and 15–1 in SEC play, to finish first in the conference and as regular season champions for the fifth straight season. Their only loss came in January, when they were upset on the road 82–94 by No. 16 nationally ranked Oklahoma in overtime.

Entering the SEC tournament as the top seed and the four-time consecutive champions, the Gamecocks earned a double-bye to the quarterfinals, where they easily defeated No. 9 Kentucky. They then moved on to the semifinals, where they defeated No. 4 LSU 83–77 to advance to the title game for the seventh straight year. However, the Gamecocks were stunned as they lost 61–78 to No. 3 Texas, who also defeated them in November in the Player's Era championship game 64–66 to hand South Carolina their first loss of the season.

In the NCAA tournament, the Gamecocks were seeded No. 1 in the Sacramento #4 Regional, as well as fourth overall in the field of 68. In the first and second rounds, they routed No. 16 Southern and No. 9 USC to advance to the Sweet Sixteen, where they took down No. 4 Oklahoma in a rematch of November's game. They won the regional title in the Elite Eight by defeating No. 3 TCU to move on to the Final Four, where they knocked off Fort Worth #1 top seed and undefeated UConn 62–48 in a rematch of last year's national championship, advancing to their third consecutive NCAA title game and ending the Huskies' 54-game win streak. However, they finished as tournament runners-up once again as they lost 51–79 to UCLA in the championship game.

== Offseason ==
=== Departures ===
South Carolina departures
Name	Number	Pos.	Height	Year	Hometown	Reason for departure
Ta'Niya Latson	00	Guard	5'9"	Senior	Miami, FL	Graduated, selected 20th overall by the Los Angeles Sparks in the 2026 WNBA draft
Maddy McDaniel	1	Guard	5'9"	Sophomore	Upper Marlboro, MD	Withdrew from South Carolina
Madina Okot	11	Center	6'6"	Senior	Mumias, Kenya	Graduated, selected 13th overall by the Atlanta Dream in the 2026 WNBA draft
Raven Johnson	25	Guard	5'9"	Senior	Atlanta, GA	Graduated, selected 10th overall by the Indiana Fever in the 2026 WNBA draft
Maryam Dauda	30	Forward	6'4"	Senior	Bentonville, AR	Graduated

=== Incoming transfers ===
South Carolina incoming transfers
Name	Number	Pos.	Height	Year	Hometown	Previous school
Brooke Quarles-Daniels	6	Guard	5'7"	5th year	Macomb, MI	Michigan (Note: Quarles-Daniels is currently eligible, pending litigation, to play a final year in the 2026-27 season following a preliminary injunction granted in Glancey v. NCAA, an August lawsuit challenging the NCAA’s age-based eligibility model, which excluded the class of 2022.)
Jordan Lee	7	Guard	6'0"	Junior	Stockton, CA	Texas

=== Recruiting class ===
College recruiting
Name	Hometown	School	Height	Weight	Commit date
Oliviyah Edwards; F	Tacoma, WA	Lincoln High School	6 ft 3 in (1.91 m)	N/A	
Oliviyah Edwards; F	Recruit ratings: Rivals: 247Sports: ESPN: (98)				
Jerzy Robinson; G	Chatsworth, CA	Sierra Canyon School	6 ft 0 in (1.83 m)	N/A	
Jerzy Robinson; G	Recruit ratings: Rivals: 247Sports: ESPN: (97)				
Kaeli Wynn; F	Santa Ana, CA	Mater Dei High School	6 ft 2 in (1.88 m)	N/A	
Kaeli Wynn; F	Recruit ratings: Rivals: 247Sports: ESPN: (96)				
Kelsi Andrews; F	Hazel Green, AL	IMG Academy	6 ft 3 in (1.91 m)	N/A	
Kelsi Andrews; F	Recruit ratings: Rivals: 247Sports: ESPN: (95)				
Overall recruit ranking: ESPN: 2
Note: In many cases, Scout, Rivals, 247Sports, On3, and ESPN may conflict in their listings of height and weight.; In these cases, the average was taken. ESPN grades are on a 100-point scale.; Sources: "2026 Player Commits". ESPN. Archived from the original on August 13, 2026.

== Preseason ==
On October 12, 2026, the SEC released its annual preseason media poll and awards. South Carolina was picked to finish first in the conference.

=== Preseason rankings ===
SEC Preseason Poll
Place	Team
1	South Carolina
2	Texas
3	LSU
4	Vanderbilt
5	Kentucky
6	Oklahoma
7	Ole Miss
8	Tennessee
9	Mississippi State
10	Alabama
11	Texas A&M
12	Florida
13	Georgia
14	Missouri
15	Auburn
16	Arkansas

=== Preseason All-SEC Teams ===
Preseason All-SEC Teams
Player	Year	Position	Team
Joyce Edwards	Junior	Forward	First
Tessa Johnson	Senior	Guard	Second
Chloe Kitts	5th Year	Forward	Second

=== Award watchlists ===
Award	Player	Position	Year
Ann Meyers Drysdale Award	Tessa Johnson	G	SR
Katrina McClain Award	Chloe Kitts	F	SR
Cheryl Miller Award	Joyce Edwards	F	JR
Wooden Award	Joyce Edwards	F	JR
Wooden Award	Tessa Johnson	G	SR
Wooden Award	Chloe Kitts	F	SR
Wooden Award	Jordan Lee	G	JR
Wooden Award	Agot Makeer	G	SO
Wade Trophy	Joyce Edwards	F	JR
Naismith Trophy	Joyce Edwards	F	JR
Naismith Trophy	Tessa Johnson	G	SR
Naismith Trophy	Chloe Kitts	F	SR

== Roster ==
Years are listed according to the new NCAA age-based eligibility model.

2026–27 South Carolina Gamecocks women's basketball team
Players
Coaches

Pos.	#	Name	Height	Year	Previous school	Hometown
F	0	Oliviyah Edwards	6 ft 3 in (1.91 m)	Fr	Lincoln High School	Tacoma, WA
F	2	Ashlyn Watkins	6 ft 3 in (1.91 m)	Sr	Cardinal Newman High School	Columbia, SC
F	3	Kaeli Wynn	6 ft 2 in (1.88 m)	Fr	Mater Dei High School	Santa Ana, CA
G	5	Tessa Johnson	6 ft 0 in (1.83 m)	Sr	St. Michael-Albertville High School	Albertville, MN
G	6	Brooke Quarles-Daniels (5th)	5 ft 7 in (1.7 m)	Sr	L'Anse Creuse North; Michigan	Macomb, MI
G	7	Jordan Lee	6 ft 0 in (1.83 m)	Jr	St. Mary's High School; Texas	Stockton, CA
F	8	Joyce Edwards	6 ft 3 in (1.91 m)	Jr	Camden High School	Camden, SC
G	9	Jerzy Robinson	6 ft 0 in (1.83 m)	Fr	Sierra Canyon School	Chatsworth, CA
G	15	Adhel Tac	6 ft 5 in (1.96 m)	Jr	South Grand Prairie High School	Grand Prairie, TX
F	21	Chloe Kitts (5th)	6 ft 2 in (1.88 m)	Sr	DME Academy	Oviedo, FL
F	23	Kelsi Andrews	6 ft 3 in (1.91 m)	Fr	IMG Academy	Hazel Green, AL
G	24	Ayla McDowell	6 ft 1 in (1.85 m)	So	Cypress Springs High School	Cypress, TX
F	31	Alicia Tournebize	6 ft 7 in (2.01 m)	So	Lycée Alain Fournier; Tango Bourges Basket	Charmeil, France
G	32	Justine Loubens	6 ft 2 in (1.88 m)	Fr	La Rouce Vendee	L'Isle-Jourdain, France
G	44	Agot Makeer	6 ft 1 in (1.85 m)	So	Montverde Academy	Thunder Bay, ON

Head coach

- Dawn Staley (Virginia)

Assistant coach(es)

- Lisa Boyer (Ithaca)
- Jolette Law (Iowa)
- Wendale Farrow (Eastern Michigan)
- Mary Wooley (USC Aiken)
- Khadijah Sessions (South Carolina)

Legend

- (C) Team captain
- (S) Suspended
- (I) Ineligible
- (W) Walk-on
- (5th) Fifth year senior
- Injured
- Current redshirt

Roster
Last update: August 13, 2026

== Schedule and results ==
Date time, TV	Rank^{#}	Opponent^{#}	Result	Record	High points	High rebounds	High assists	Site (attendance) city, state
Exhibition
September 27, 2026*; 4:00 p.m., ESPN+		vs. Charleston; TheLinkU Invitational	W 91–60		28 – J. Edwards	16 – J. Edwards	3 – Tied	Credit One Stadium; Charleston, SC
October 23, 2026*; 7:00 p.m.	No. 1	Benedict	W 113–34		17 – Tied	11 – Robinson	5 – Robinson	Colonial Life Arena; Columbia, SC
Non-conference regular season
November 2, 2026*; 12:00 p.m., ESPN	No. 1	vs. No. 20 Maryland; Oui-Play	W 101–93	1–0	23 – J. Edwards	10 – Watkins	5 – Tied	Adidas Arena (5,000); Paris, France
November 8, 2026*; 5:30 p.m., ESPN	No. 1	vs. No. 12 North Carolina; Ally Tipoff	W 84–39	2–0	17 – Kitts	10 – Tied	3 – Lee	Spectrum Center (11,530); Charlotte, NC
November 12, 2026*; 7:00 p.m., ESPN2	No. 1	at Clemson; Rivalry	W 65–44	3–0	13 – Johnson	12 – Kitts	4 – J. Edwards	Littlejohn Coliseum (5,629); Clemson, SC
November 15, 2026*; 1:00 p.m., ABC	No. 1	vs. No. 3 USC; The Real SC	W 89–85	4–0	28 – Johnson	12 – Kitts	5 – Makeer	Bon Secours Wellness Arena (10,430); Greenville, SC
November 17, 2026*; 7:00 p.m., SECN+	No. 1	Florida Gulf Coast	W 116–58	5–0	20 – J. Edwards	13 – Tournebize	6 – Tied	Colonial Life Arena (16,077); Columbia, SC
November 21, 2026*; 1:30 p.m., Peacock/NBCSN	No. 1	at Providence	W 72–43	6–0	22 – J. Edwards	9 – Watkins	5 – Makeer	Alumni Hall (1,578); Providence, RI
November 24, 2026*; 8:00 p.m., FS1		vs. UConn; Hall of Fame Basketball Women's Showcase						Mohegan Sun Arena; Uncasville, CT
November 28, 2026*; 2:30 p.m., SECN+		Tennessee State; PowHER Player Classic first round						Colonial Life Arena; Columbia, SC
November 29, 2026*; 12:00 p.m./2:30 p.m., SECN+		North Carolina Central or Alabama A&M; PowHER Player Classic						Colonial Life Arena; Columbia, SC
December 3, 2026*; 7:00 p.m., ESPN		at Duke; ACC–SEC Challenge						Cameron Indoor Stadium; Durham, NC
December 6, 2026*; 4:00 p.m., ABC		Oklahoma State						Colonial Life Arena; Columbia, SC
December 12, 2026*; 12:00 p.m., SECN+		Wofford						Colonial Life Arena; Columbia, SC
December 15, 2026*; 7:00 p.m., SECN+		Albany						Colonial Life Arena; Columbia, SC
December 19, 2026*; 8:30 p.m., ESPN		vs. UCLA; Players Era Women's Festival						Michelob Ultra Arena; Paradise, NV
December 20, 2026*; 7:30 p.m., ESPN		vs. Notre Dame; Players Era Women's Festival						Michelob Ultra Arena; Paradise, NV
December 28, 2026*; 6:00 p.m., SECN+		Gardner–Webb						Colonial Life Arena; Columbia, SC
SEC regular season
December 31, 2026; 7:00 p.m., SECN		Alabama						Colonial Life Arena; Columbia, SC
January 3, 2027; 3:00 p.m., ABC		at Texas						Moody Center; Austin, TX
January 7, 2027; 7:00 p.m., SECN		at Mississippi State						Humphrey Coliseum; Starkville, MS
January 10, 2027; 4:00 p.m., SECN		Arkansas						Colonial Life Arena; Columbia, SC
January 14, 2027; 7:30 p.m., ESPN		Oklahoma						Colonial Life Arena; Columbia, SC
January 17, 2027; 4:00 p.m., SECN		at Missouri						Mizzou Arena; Columbia, MO
January 21, 2027; 7:00 p.m., SECN+		Florida						Colonial Life Arena; Columbia, SC
January 28, 2027; 6:30 p.m., SECN		at Tennessee						Thompson–Boling Arena; Knoxville, TN
January 31, 2027; 3:00 p.m., ESPN		Kentucky						Colonial Life Arena; Columbia, SC
February 4, 2027; 7:00 p.m., ESPN		at Vanderbilt						Memorial Gymnasium; Nashville, TN
February 8, 2027; 7:00 p.m., ESPN2		at Oklahoma						Lloyd Noble Center; Norman, OK
February 11, 2027; 6:00 p.m., SECN		Texas A&M						Colonial Life Arena; Columbia, SC
February 14, 2027; 1:00 p.m., ESPNU		at Ole Miss						SJB Pavilion; Oxford, MS
February 21, 2027; 3:00 p.m., ABC		LSU						Colonial Life Arena; Columbia, SC
February 25, 2027; 7:00 p.m., SECN+		Auburn						Colonial Life Arena; Columbia, SC
February 28, 2027; 12:00 p.m., SECN		at Georgia						Stegeman Coliseum; Athens, GA
SEC tournament
March 3–7, 2027; TBA		vs.						Bon Secours Wellness Arena; Greenville, SC
*Non-conference game. ^{#}Rankings from AP Poll. (#) Tournament seedings in parentheses. All times are in Eastern.

== Rankings ==
Ranking movements Legend: ( ) = First-place votes
	Week																				
Poll	Pre	1	2	3	4	5	6	7	8	9	10	11	12	13	14	15	16	17	18	19	Final
AP	1 (23)	1 (32)	1 (33)																		
Coaches	1 (26)	1 (32)	1 (32)																		
