= 2026–27 LSU Tigers women's basketball team =

American college basketball season

2026–27 LSU Tigers women's basketball
- Conference: Southeastern Conference

Ranking
- Coaches: No. 7
- AP: No. 9
- Record: 6–0 (0–0 SEC)
- Head coach: Kim Mulkey (6th season)
- Associate head coach: Bob Starkey
- Assistant coaches: Fitzroy Anthony; Murriel Page; Kaylin Rice; Seimone Augustus
- Home arena: Pete Maravich Assembly Center

2026–27 SEC women's basketball standings
	Conf.				Overall
Team	W		L	PCT	W		L	PCT
No. 9 LSU	0	–	0	–	6	–	0	1.000
No. 14 Oklahoma	0	–	0	–	6	–	0	1.000
Tennessee	0	–	0	–	6	–	0	1.000
Arkansas	0	–	0	–	5	–	0	1.000
No. 12 Kentucky	0	–	0	–	5	–	0	1.000
Mississippi State	0	–	0	–	5	–	0	1.000
Missouri	0	–	0	–	5	–	0	1.000
No. 1 South Carolina	0	–	0	–	5	–	0	1.000
No. 6 Texas	0	–	0	–	5	–	0	1.000
Texas A&M	0	–	0	–	5	–	0	1.000
Alabama	0	–	0	–	6	–	1	.857
Georgia	0	–	0	–	5	–	1	.833
No. 11 Vanderbilt	0	–	0	–	5	–	1	.833
Auburn	0	–	0	–	4	–	1	.800
No. 19т Ole Miss	0	–	0	–	4	–	1	.800
Florida	0	–	0	–	4	–	2	.667
† 2027 SEC tournament winner As of November 20, 2026; Rankings from AP poll

The 2026–27 LSU Tigers women's basketball team currently represents Louisiana State University during the 2026–27 NCAA Division I women's basketball season. The Tigers, led by sixth-year head coach Kim Mulkey, play their home games at Pete Maravich Assembly Center in Baton Rouge, Louisiana and compete as a member of the Southeastern Conference (SEC).

On August 24, Mulkey announced that junior forward Kate Koval had departed from the program and withdrawn from LSU due to personal reasons. This was heavily speculated to be due to the signing of Russian freshman Anna Minaeva, as Koval is Ukrainian. She later confirmed this as the reason for her departure in an Instagram post on September 2. Koval was granted a waiver by the NCAA and later committed to play for Baylor on September 12.

On November 5, the Tigers defeated Texas Southern 131–22, setting the NCAA Division I women's basketball record for the largest margin of victory (109 points) against a Division I opponent.

== Previous season ==
The Tigers finished the 2025–26 season 29–6 overall and 12–4 in SEC play, to finish in fourth in the conference. As the No. 4 seed in the SEC tournament, they earned a double-bye to the quarterfinals, where they routed No. 7 Oklahoma 112–78, with the Tigers scoring the second most points in an SEC tournament game, only surpassed by Tennessee's 118–44 win over Florida in the inaugural 1980 tournament. They then moved on to the semifinals, where they fell 77–83 to top-seeded South Carolina.

Following their elimination, the Tigers earned an at-large bid to the NCAA tournament, where they were seeded No. 2 in the Sacramento #2 Regional. In the first and second rounds respectively, LSU defeated No. 15 Jacksonville 116–58 and No. 7 Texas Tech 101–47, the latter of which was the 16th game of the season for LSU where they scored 100 or more points, setting a Division I record. The Tigers then moved on to the Sweet Sixteen, where they were eliminated 85–87 by No. 3 seeded Duke from a game-winning three-pointer by Blue Devil guard Ashlon Jackson.

== Offseason ==
=== Departures ===
LSU departures
Name	Number	Pos.	Height	Year	Hometown	Reason for departure
Amiya Joyner	1	Forward	6'2"	Senior	Farmville, NC	Graduated, signed with the UpShot League's Greensboro Groove
Bella Hines	3	Guard	5'10"	Freshman	Albuquerque, NM	Transferred to TCU
Flau'jae Johnson	4	Guard	5'10"	Senior	Savannah, GA	Graduated, selected 8th overall by the Golden State Valkyries in the 2026 WNBA draft
Divine Bourrage	6	Guard	5'11"	Freshman	Davenport, IA	Transferred to Illinois
Kate Koval	13	Forward	6'5"	Junior	Kyiv, Ukraine	Left team, transferred to Baylor
Izzy Besselman	14	Guard	5'10"	Senior	Baton Rouge, LA	Graduated
Kailyn Gilbert	16	Guard	5'8"	Senior	Tampa, FL	Graduated, transferred to Texas A&M
Jada Richard	30	Guard	5'7"	Sophomore	Opelousas, LA	Transferred to Ole Miss

=== Incoming transfers ===
LSU incoming transfers
Name	Number	Pos.	Height	Year	Hometown	Previous school
Laila Reynolds	00	Guard	6'1"	Senior	Prince George's County, MD	Florida
Jada Williams	8	Guard	5'8"	Senior	Kansas City, MO	Iowa State
Chloe Larry	21	Guard	5'8"	Junior	Bossier City, LA	Tennessee Tech

=== Recruiting class ===
College recruiting
Name	Hometown	School	Height	Weight	Commit date
Lola Lampley; W	Indianapolis, IN	Lawrence Central High School	6 ft 2 in (1.88 m)	N/A	
Lola Lampley; W	Recruit ratings: Rivals: 247Sports: ESPN: (95)				
Overall recruit ranking:
Note: In many cases, Scout, Rivals, 247Sports, On3, and ESPN may conflict in their listings of height and weight.; In these cases, the average was taken. ESPN grades are on a 100-point scale.; Sources: "2026 Player Commits". ESPN. Archived from the original on August 21, 2026.

== Preseason ==
On October 12, 2026, the SEC released its annual preseason media poll and awards. LSU was picked to finish third in the conference.

=== Preseason rankings ===
SEC Preseason Poll
Place	Team
1	South Carolina
2	Texas
3	LSU
4	Vanderbilt
5	Kentucky
6	Oklahoma
7	Ole Miss
8	Tennessee
9	Mississippi State
10	Alabama
11	Texas A&M
12	Florida
13	Georgia
14	Missouri
15	Auburn
16	Arkansas

=== Preseason All-SEC Teams ===
Preseason All-SEC Teams
Player	Year	Position	Team
Mikaylah Williams	Senior	Guard	First
MiLaysia Fulwiley	Senior	Guard	Second

== Roster ==
2026–27 LSU Tigers women's basketball team
Players
Coaches

Pos.	#	Name	Height	Year	Previous school	Hometown
G	00	Laila Reynolds	6 ft 1 in (1.85 m)	Sr	Shabach Christian Academy; Florida	Prince George's County, MD
G	1	Lola Lampley	6 ft 1 in (1.85 m)	Fr	Lawrence Central High School	Indianapolis, IN
F	2	Grace Knox	6 ft 2 in (1.88 m)	So	Etiwanda High School	Las Vegas, NV
F	3	Noa Morro	6 ft 3 in (1.91 m)	Sr		Mallorca, Spain
C	5	Anna Minaeva	6 ft 5 in (1.96 m)	Fr		Moscow, Russia
G	8	Jada Williams	5 ft 8 in (1.73 m)	Sr	La Jolla Country Day School; Iowa State	Kansas City, MO
G	11	ZaKiyah Johnson	6 ft 0 in (1.83 m)	So	Sacred Heart Academy	Shelbyville, KY
G	12	Mikaylah Williams	6 ft 0 in (1.83 m)	Sr	Parkway High School	Bossier City, LA
F	15	Meghan Yarnevich	6 ft 0 in (1.83 m)	So	The Bullis School	Potomac, MD
G	21	Chloe Larry	5 ft 8 in (1.73 m)	Jr	Parkway High School; Tennessee Tech	Bossier City, LA
G	23	MiLaysia Fulwiley	5 ft 10 in (1.78 m)	Sr	W. J. Keenan High School; South Carolina	Columbia, SC

Head coach

- Kim Mulkey (Louisiana Tech)

Assistant coach(es)

- Bob Starkey
- Fitzroy Anthony (Palm Beach Atlantic)
- Murriel Page (Florida)
- Kaylin Rice (Baylor)
- Seimone Augustus (LSU)

Legend

- (C) Team captain
- (S) Suspended
- (I) Ineligible
- (W) Walk-on
- Injured
- Current redshirt

Roster
Last update: September 12, 2026

== Schedule and results ==
Date time, TV	Rank^{#}	Opponent^{#}	Result	Record	High points	High rebounds	High assists	Site (attendance) city, state
Exhibition
October 22, 2026*; 7:00 p.m., SECN+/ESPN+	No. 9	UNT Dallas	W 159–31		32 – Fulwiley	10 – Johnson	17 – Fulwiley	Pete Maravich Assembly Center (2,149); Baton Rouge, LA
October 29, 2026*; 7:00 p.m., SECN+/ESPN+	No. 9	Loyola New Orleans	W 119–54		23 – M. Williams	9 – Johnson	8 – J. Williams	Pete Maravich Assembly Center (2,437); Baton Rouge, LA
Non-conference regular season
November 2, 2026*; 6:00 p.m., SECN	No. 9	Southeastern Louisiana	W 129–35	1–0	33 – Johnson	13 – Johnson	8 – J. Williams	Pete Maravich Assembly Center (9,134); Baton Rouge, LA
November 5, 2026*; 7:00 p.m., SECN+/ESPN+	No. 9	Texas Southern	W 131–22	2–0	21 – Minaeva	8 – Tied	8 – Larry	Pete Maravich Assembly Center (9,591); Baton Rouge, LA
November 10, 2026*; 7:00 p.m., SECN+/ESPN+	No. 9	McNeese	W 100–43	3–0	17 – M. Williams	12 – J. Williams	8 – M. Williams	Pete Maravich Assembly Center (9,202); Baton Rouge, LA
November 13, 2026*; 6:00 p.m., SECN+/ESPN+	No. 9	Denver	W 101–37	4–0	23 – Fulwiley	7 – M. Williams	6 – J. Williams	Pete Maravich Assembly Center (9,134); Baton Rouge, LA
November 16, 2026*; 7:00 p.m., SECN+/ESPN+	No. 9	Troy	W 116–70	5–0	25 – Johnson	11 – Johnson	6 – M. Williams	Pete Maravich Assembly Center (9,178); Baton Rouge, LA
November 19, 2026*; 7:00 p.m., SECN+/ESPN+	No. 9	Fairleigh Dickinson	W 91–33	6–0	26 – M. Williams	11 – Knox	6 – J. Williams	Pete Maravich Assembly Center (8,999); Baton Rouge, LA
November 23, 2026*; 7:00 p.m., SECN+/ESPN+		Belmont						Pete Maravich Assembly Center; Baton Rouge, LA
November 27, 2026*; 3:30 p.m., ION		vs. Villanova; Fort Myers Tip-Off Island Division						Suncoast Credit Union Arena; Fort Myers, FL
November 28, 2026*; 3:30 p.m., ION		vs. NC State; Fort Myers Tip-Off Island Division						Suncoast Credit Union Arena; Fort Myers, FL
December 2, 2026*; 6:15 p.m., ESPN2		at North Carolina; ACC–SEC Challenge						Carmichael Arena; Chapel Hill, NC
December 6, 2026*; 2:00 p.m., ESPN+		at Northwestern State						Prather Coliseum; Natchitoches, LA
December 13, 2026*; 12:00 p.m., ESPN		vs. Houston; Houston Hoopfest						Toyota Center; Houston, TX
December 15, 2026*; 11:00 a.m., SECN+/ESPN+		Stonehill						Pete Maravich Assembly Center; Baton Rouge, LA
December 20, 2026*; 12:00 p.m., ABC		vs. UConn; Sprouts Farmers Market espnW Invitational						Bridgestone Arena; Nashville, TN
December 27, 2026*; 2:00 p.m., SECN+/ESPN+		Alcorn State						Pete Maravich Assembly Center; Baton Rouge, LA
SEC regular season
December 31, 2026; 6:00 p.m., SECN+/ESPN+		at Auburn						Neville Arena; Auburn, AL
January 3, 2027; 12:00 p.m., ABC		Vanderbilt						Pete Maravich Assembly Center; Baton Rouge, LA
January 7, 2027; 8:00 p.m., SECN		Texas A&M						Pete Maravich Assembly Center; Baton Rouge, LA
January 10, 2027; 1:00 p.m., SECN		at Florida						O'Connell Center; Gainesville, FL
January 14, 2027; 7:00 p.m., SECN+/ESPN+		Mississippi State						Pete Maravich Assembly Center; Baton Rouge, LA
January 17, 2027; 1:00 p.m., SECN		at Arkansas						Bud Walton Arena; Fayetteville, AR
January 21, 2027; 6:00 p.m., SECN+/ESPN+		at Alabama						Coleman Coliseum; Tuscaloosa, AL
January 28, 2027; 7:00 p.m., SECN+/ESPN+		Auburn						Pete Maravich Assembly Center; Baton Rouge, LA
February 1, 2027; 7:00 p.m., ESPN2		Ole Miss						Pete Maravich Assembly Center; Baton Rouge, LA
February 4, 2027; 7:00 p.m., ESPN2		at Kentucky						Memorial Coliseum; Lexington, KY
February 7, 2027; 1:00 p.m., SECN		at Missouri						Mizzou Arena; Columbia, MO
February 11, 2027; 6:00 p.m., ESPN		Texas						Pete Maravich Assembly Center; Baton Rouge, LA
February 14, 2027; 2:00 p.m., SECN+/ESPN+		Georgia						Pete Maravich Assembly Center; Baton Rouge, LA
February 21, 2027; 2:00 p.m., ABC		at South Carolina						Colonial Life Arena; Columbia, SC
February 25, 2027; 5:00 p.m., ESPN		at Tennessee						Thompson–Boling Arena; Knoxville, TN
February 28, 2027; 1:00 p.m., ESPN/ESPN2		Oklahoma						Pete Maravich Assembly Center; Baton Rouge, LA
SEC tournament
March 3–7, 2027; TBA		vs.						Bon Secours Wellness Arena; Greenville, SC
*Non-conference game. ^{#}Rankings from AP Poll. (#) Tournament seedings in parentheses. All times are in Central.

== Rankings ==
Ranking movements Legend: ██ Increase in ranking ██ Decrease in ranking
	Week																				
Poll	Pre	1	2	3	4	5	6	7	8	9	10	11	12	13	14	15	16	17	18	19	Final
AP	9	9	9																		
Coaches	8	9	7																		
