= 2027 SEC women's basketball tournament =

American college basketball postseason tournament

- Classification: Division I
- Season: 2026–27
- Teams: 16
- Site: Bon Secours Wellness Arena; Greenville, SC

2026–27 SEC women's basketball standings
| | Conf. | | | | Overall |
| Team | W | | L | PCT | W | | L | PCT |
|---|---|---|---|---|---|---|---|---|
| Arkansas | 0 | – | 0 | – | 4 | – | 0 | 1.000 |
| Georgia | 0 | – | 0 | – | 4 | – | 0 | 1.000 |
| No. 12 Kentucky | 0 | – | 0 | – | 4 | – | 0 | 1.000 |
| Missouri | 0 | – | 0 | – | 4 | – | 0 | 1.000 |
| Tennessee | 0 | – | 0 | – | 4 | – | 0 | 1.000 |
| No. 8 Vanderbilt | 0 | – | 0 | – | 4 | – | 0 | 1.000 |
| Auburn | 0 | – | 0 | – | 3 | – | 0 | 1.000 |
| No. 9 LSU | 0 | – | 0 | – | 3 | – | 0 | 1.000 |
| Mississippi State | 0 | – | 0 | – | 3 | – | 0 | 1.000 |
| No. 14 Oklahoma | 0 | – | 0 | – | 3 | – | 0 | 1.000 |
| No. 21 Ole Miss | 0 | – | 0 | – | 3 | – | 0 | 1.000 |
| No. 1 South Carolina | 0 | – | 0 | – | 3 | – | 0 | 1.000 |
| No. 6 Texas | 0 | – | 0 | – | 3 | – | 0 | 1.000 |
| Texas A&M | 0 | – | 0 | – | 3 | – | 0 | 1.000 |
| Alabama | 0 | – | 0 | – | 4 | – | 1 | .800 |
| Florida | 0 | – | 0 | – | 3 | – | 1 | .750 |
† 2027 SEC tournament winner As of November 13, 2026; Rankings from AP poll

The 2027 Southeastern Conference women's basketball tournament is an upcoming postseason women's basketball tournament for the Southeastern Conference to be held at the Bon Secours Wellness Arena in Greenville, South Carolina, from March 3 through 7, 2027. The winner of this tournament earns an automatic bid to the 2027 NCAA Division I women's basketball tournament.

== Seeds ==
| Seed | School | Conference record | Overall record | Tiebreaker |
|---|---|---|---|---|
| 1 | | | | |
| 2 | | | | |
| 3 | | | | |
| 4 | | | | |
| 5 | | | | |
| 6 | | | | |
| 7 | | | | |
| 8 | | | | |
| 9 | | | | |
| 10 | | | | |
| 11 | | | | |
| 12 | | | | |
| 13 | | | | |
| 14 | | | | |
| 15 | | | | |
| 16 | | | | |
‡ – SEC regular season champions, and tournament No. 1 seed. † – Received a double-bye in the conference tournament. # – Received a single-bye in the conference tournament. Overall records include all games played in the SEC Tournament.

== Schedule ==
| Game | Time* | Matchup^{#} | Television | Attendance |
First round – Wednesday, March 3
| 1 | | #9 vs. #16 | | |
| 2 | | #12 vs. #13 | | |
| 3 | | #10 vs. #15 | | |
| 4 | | #11 vs. #14 | | |
Second round – Thursday, March 4
| 5 | | #8 vs. Winner of game 1 | | |
| 6 | | #5 vs. Winner of game 2 | | |
| 7 | | #7 vs. Winner of game 3 | | |
| 8 | | #6 vs. Winner of game 4 | | |
Quarterfinals – Friday, March 5
| 9 | | #1 vs. Winner of game 5 | | |
| 10 | | #4 vs. Winner of game 6 | | |
| 11 | | #2 vs. Winner of game 7 | | |
| 12 | | #3 vs. Winner of game 8 | | |
Semifinals – Saturday, March 6
| 13 | | Winner of game 9 vs Winner of game 10 | | |
| 14 | | Winner of game 11 vs Winner of game 12 | | |
Championship – Sunday, March 7
| 15 | | Winner of game 13 vs Winner of game 14 | | |
*Game times in ET. # – Rankings denote tournament seed

== Bracket ==
First round Wednesday, March 3
9
16
12
13
10
15
11
14

Second round Thursday, March 4
8
5
7
6

Quarterfinals; Friday, March 5
1
4
2
3

Semifinals; Saturday, March 6

Championship; Sunday, March 7
