= 2026–27 Alabama Crimson Tide women's basketball team =

American collegiate basketball season

2026–27 Alabama Crimson Tide women's basketball
- Conference: Southeastern Conference
- Record: 6–1 (0–0 SEC)
- Head coach: Pauline Love (1st season)
- Associate head coach: Amy Wright
- Assistant coaches: Tyus Hooks; Chester Nichols; Chelsea Dungee; Cal Watson
- Home arena: Coleman Coliseum

2026–27 SEC women's basketball standings
	Conf.				Overall
Team	W		L	PCT	W		L	PCT
No. 9 LSU	0	–	0	–	6	–	0	1.000
No. 14 Oklahoma	0	–	0	–	6	–	0	1.000
Tennessee	0	–	0	–	6	–	0	1.000
Arkansas	0	–	0	–	5	–	0	1.000
No. 12 Kentucky	0	–	0	–	5	–	0	1.000
Mississippi State	0	–	0	–	5	–	0	1.000
Missouri	0	–	0	–	5	–	0	1.000
No. 1 South Carolina	0	–	0	–	5	–	0	1.000
No. 6 Texas	0	–	0	–	5	–	0	1.000
Texas A&M	0	–	0	–	5	–	0	1.000
Alabama	0	–	0	–	6	–	1	.857
Georgia	0	–	0	–	5	–	1	.833
No. 11 Vanderbilt	0	–	0	–	5	–	1	.833
Auburn	0	–	0	–	4	–	1	.800
No. 19т Ole Miss	0	–	0	–	4	–	1	.800
Florida	0	–	0	–	4	–	2	.667
† 2027 SEC tournament winner As of November 20, 2026; Rankings from AP poll

The 2026–27 Alabama Crimson Tide women's basketball team currently represent the University of Alabama during the 2026–27 NCAA Division I women's basketball season. The Crimson Tide, led by first-year head coach Pauline Love, play their home games at the Coleman Coliseum in Tuscaloosa, Alabama, and compete as a member of the Southeastern Conference (SEC).

== Previous season ==
The Crimson Tide finished the 2025–26 season 24–11 overall and 7–9 in SEC play, to finish in a tie for tenth in the conference with Texas A&M. As the No. 11 seed in the SEC tournament, they defeated No. 14 seeded Missouri 65–48 and No. 6 seeded Tennessee 76–64 in the first and second rounds respectively, before falling to eventual SEC tournament winners, No. 3 seeded Texas, 60–83 in the quarterfinals.

Following the SEC tournament, the Crimson Tide received an at-large bid to the NCAA tournament, where they were seeded No. 6 in the Fort Worth #3 Regional. They defeated No. 11 Rhode Island 68–55 in the first round before losing 68–69 to No. 3 seeded Louisville in the second round to end their season.

== Offseason ==
=== Departures ===
Alabama Departures
Name	Num	Pos.	Height	Year	Hometown	Reason for Departure
Eris Lester	4	Guard	5'11"	Sophomore	Jacksonville, FL	Transferred to Virginia
Reychel Douglas	5	Guard	6'0"	(redshirt) Sophomore	Raleigh, NC	Transferred to Rice
Waiata Jennings	7	Guard	5'9"	Senior	Rotorua, New Zealand	Graduated
Ta'Mia Scott	15	Guard	6'0"	Senior	Clarksville, TN	Graduated; signed with the UpShot League's Savannah Steel
Lourdes Da Silva Costa	17	Forward	6'3"	Freshman	Stockholm, Sweden	Transferred to George Mason
Diana Collins	20	Guard	5'9"	Junior	Lilburn, GA	Transferred to Kentucky
Essence Cody	21	Forward	6'4"	Junior	Valdosta, GA	Transferred to Texas A&M
Karly Weathers	22	Guard	5'11"	Senior	Loretto, TN	Graduated
Jessica Timmons	23	Guard	5'8"	(redshirt) Senior	Charlotte, NC	Graduated; selected 40th overall by the Indiana Fever in the 2026 WNBA draft
Joy Egbuna	25	Forward	6'3"	Freshman	Arlington, TX	Transferred to Florida State
Alancia Ramsey	32	Forward	6'0"	Junior	Delray Beach, FL	Transferred to Pittsburgh

=== Incoming transfers ===
Alabama incoming transfers
Name	Num	Pos.	Height	Year	Hometown	Previous School
Mykelle Richards	2	Forward	6'1"	Junior	San Bernardino, CA	Long Beach State
Alayna West	3	Guard	5'10"	Sophomore	Madison, WI	DePaul
Rickell Brown	4	Guard	5'6"	Junior	Sumter, SC	Newberry (D-II)
Aaliyah Roberson	7	Forward	6'2"	Graduate Student	San Antonio, TX	TCU
Kylie Torrence	10	Forward	6'2"	Sophomore	High Point, NC	Cincinnati
Brooke Coffey	12	Forward	6'1"	Senior	St. Charles, MO	Lindenwood
Amirah Anderson	21	Guard	5'11"	Sophomore	Stafford, VA	Boston College
Caitlin Staley	22	Forward	6'4"	Senior	Augusta, GA	Charlotte
Paris Bradley	23	Guard	5'9"	Junior	Carrollton, TX	Louisiana Tech

=== Recruiting class ===
There was no 2026 recruiting class.

== Preseason ==
On October 12, 2026, the SEC released its annual preseason media poll and awards. Alabama was picked to finish tenth in the conference.

=== Preseason rankings ===
SEC Preseason Poll
Place	Team
1	South Carolina
2	Texas
3	LSU
4	Vanderbilt
5	Kentucky
6	Oklahoma
7	Ole Miss
8	Tennessee
9	Mississippi State
10	Alabama
11	Texas A&M
12	Florida
13	Georgia
14	Missouri
15	Auburn
16	Arkansas

=== Preseason All-SEC Teams ===
No players were named to the All-SEC First or Second Team.

== Roster ==
2026–27 Alabama Crimson Tide women's basketball team
Players
Coaches

Pos.	#	Name	Height	Year	Previous school	Hometown
G	1	Ace Austin	5 ft 7 in (1.7 m)	So	Spring Garden High School	Spring Garden, AL
F	2	Mykelle Richards	6 ft 1 in (1.85 m)	Jr	Etiwanda High School; Long Beach State	San Bernardino, CA
G	3	Alayna West	5 ft 10 in (1.78 m)	So	La Follette High School; DePaul	Madison, WI
G	4	Rickell Brown	5 ft 6 in (1.68 m)	Jr	Sumter High School; Newberry College	Sumter, SC
F	7	Aaliyah Roberson	6 ft 2 in (1.88 m)	GS	Tom C. Clark High School; TCU	San Antonio, TX
F	10	Kylie Torrence	6 ft 2 in (1.88 m)	Fr	Winston-Salem Christian School; Cincinnati	High Point, NC
G	11	Tianna Chambers	6 ft 1 in (1.85 m)	So	Cherry Creek High School	Aurora, CO
G	13	Brooke Coffey	6 ft 1 in (1.85 m)	Sr	Incarnate Word Academy; Lindenwood	St. Charles, MO
F	20	Leah Brooks	6 ft 3 in (1.91 m)	Jr	Hazel Green High School	Toney, AL
G	21	Amirah Anderson	5 ft 11 in (1.8 m)	So	Bishop Ireton High School	Stafford, VA
F	22	Caitlin Staley	6 ft 4 in (1.93 m)	Sr	Greenbrier High School; Charlotte	Augusta, GA
G	23	Paris Bradley	5 ft 9 in (1.75 m)	Jr	Hebron High School; Louisiana Tech	Carrollton, TX
F	31	Naomi Jones	6 ft 4 in (1.93 m)	Sr	Jackson High School	Jackson, AL

Head coach

- Pauline Love (Southern Miss)

Assistant coach(es)

- Amy Wright (Arkansas)
- Tyus Hooks (Mississippi)
- Chester Nichols (Greenville)
- Chelsea Dungee (Arkansas)
- Cal Watson (Oklahoma)

Legend

- (C) Team captain
- (S) Suspended
- (I) Ineligible
- (W) Walk-on
- Injured
- Current redshirt

Roster
Last update: July 22, 2026

== Schedule and results ==
Date time, TV	Rank^{#}	Opponent^{#}	Result	Record	High points	High rebounds	High assists	Site (attendance) city, state
Exhibition
October 15, 2026*; 12:00 p.m.		vs. UAH; Ballin' in Boutwell	W 105–65		21 – Austin	8 – Austin	6 – Tied	Boutwell Auditorium (1,112); Birmingham, AL
October 27, 2026*; 2:00 p.m.		Mississippi Christian	W 88–40		–	–	–	Coleman Coliseum; Tuscaloosa, AL
Non-conference regular season
November 2, 2026*; 6:00 p.m., SECN+		Queens	W 92–56	1–0	16 – Torrence	9 – Torrence	5 – Tied	Coleman Coliseum (2,376); Tuscaloosa, AL
November 4, 2026*; 6:00 p.m., SECN+		LSU New Orleans	W 118–45	2–0	17 – West	14 – West	9 – West	Coleman Coliseum (2,397); Tuscaloosa, AL
November 5, 2026*; 6:00 p.m., SECN+		Alabama A&M	W 96–43	3–0	18 – Torrence	8 – Torrence	6 – Chambers	Coleman Coliseum (2,475); Tuscaloosa, AL
November 8, 2026*; 11:00 a.m., ESPN2		at Tulane	W 68–63	4–0	24 – Austin	8 – Jones	4 – Austin	Devlin Fieldhouse (962); New Orleans, LA
November 12, 2026*; 6:00 p.m., ESPN+		at Memphis	L 70–75	4–1	19 – Austin	6 – Roberson	9 – Austin	Elma Roane Fieldhouse (1,036); Memphis, TN
November 15, 2026*; 2:00 p.m., SECN+		Mercer	W 86–47	5–1	13 – Tied	11 – Roberson	7 – Austin	Coleman Coliseum (2,359); Tuscaloosa, AL
November 19, 2026*; 7:30 p.m., ESPNU		vs. Florida A&M; WBCA Showcase	W 94–59	6–1	17 – Tied	8 – West	7 – West	State Farm Field House; Orlando, FL
November 21, 2026*; 4:00 p.m., ESPN+		vs. No. 24 North Carolina; WBCA Showcase						State Farm Field House; Orlando, FL
November 24, 2026*; 6:00 p.m., SECN+		Louisiana–Monroe						Coleman Coliseum; Tuscaloosa, AL
November 25, 2026*; 6:00 p.m., SECN+		Samford						Coleman Coliseum; Tuscaloosa, AL
December 3, 2026*; 6:00 p.m., SECN		Georgia Tech; ACC–SEC Challenge						Coleman Coliseum; Tuscaloosa, AL
December 6, 2026*; 2:00 p.m., SECN+		Tennessee State						Coleman Coliseum; Tuscaloosa, AL
December 14, 2026*; 11:00 a.m., SECN+		West Georgia						Coleman Coliseum; Tuscaloosa, AL
December 16, 2026*; 6:00 p.m., SECN+		Alcorn State						Coleman Coliseum; Tuscaloosa, AL
December 20, 2026*; 12:00 p.m., SECN+		Chattanooga						Coleman Coliseum; Tuscaloosa, AL
December 21, 2026*; 2:00 p.m., SECN+		Coastal Carolina						Coleman Coliseum; Tuscaloosa, AL
SEC regular season
December 31, 2026; 6:00 p.m., SECN		at South Carolina						Colonial Life Arena; Columbia, SC
January 3, 2027; 5:00 p.m., SECN		Georgia						Coleman Coliseum; Tuscaloosa, AL
January 7, 2027; 6:00 p.m., SECN+		Florida						Coleman Coliseum; Tuscaloosa, AL
January 11, 2027; 6:00 p.m., SECN		at Ole Miss						SJB Pavilion; Oxford, MS
January 14, 2027; TBA, SECN+		at Texas						Moody Center; Austin, TX
January 21, 2027; 6:00 p.m., SECN+		LSU						Coleman Coliseum; Tuscaloosa, AL
January 24, 2027; 12:00 p.m., SECN		at Tennessee						Thompson–Boling Arena; Knoxville, TN
January 28, 2027; 7:30 p.m., SECN		at Kentucky						Memorial Coliseum; Lexington, KY
January 31, 2027; 6:00 p.m., SECN		Missouri						Coleman Coliseum; Tuscaloosa, AL
February 4, 2027; 6:00 p.m., SECN+		at Oklahoma						Lloyd Noble Center; Norman, OK
February 7, 2027; 5:00 p.m., SECN		Auburn						Coleman Coliseum; Tuscaloosa, AL
February 11, 2027; 7:30 p.m., SECN		Vanderbilt						Coleman Coliseum; Tuscaloosa, AL
February 14, 2027; 2:00 p.m., SECN+		at Arkansas						Bud Walton Arena; Fayetteville, AR
February 21, 2027; 2:00 p.m., SECN+		at Mississippi State						Humphrey Coliseum; Starkville, MS
February 25, 2027; 8:00 p.m., SECN		Ole Miss						Coleman Coliseum; Tuscaloosa, AL
February 28, 2027; 2:00 p.m., SECN+		Texas A&M						Coleman Coliseum; Tuscaloosa, AL
SEC tournament
March 3–7, 2027; TBA		vs.						Bon Secours Wellness Arena; Greenville, SC
*Non-conference game. ^{#}Rankings from AP Poll. (#) Tournament seedings in parentheses. All times are in Central.

== Rankings ==
Ranking movements Legend: — = Not ranked RV = Received votes
	Week																				
Poll	Pre	1	2	3	4	5	6	7	8	9	10	11	12	13	14	15	16	17	18	19	Final
AP	RV																				
Coaches	—																				

== See also ==
- 2026–27 Alabama Crimson Tide men's basketball team
