= Providence Academy (Plymouth, Minnesota) =

Catholic K-12 school in Plymouth, MN

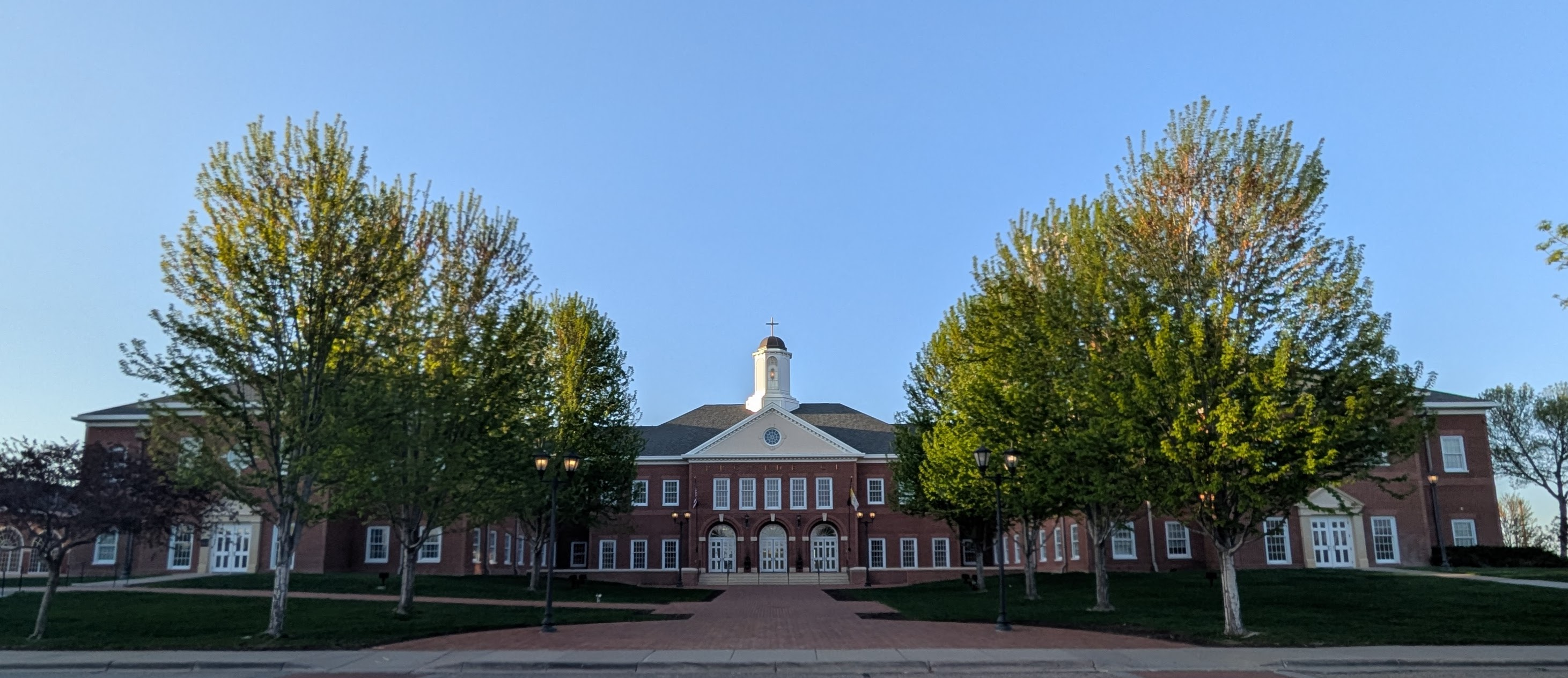

Location
- 15100 Schmidt Lake Road; Plymouth, Minnesota, (Hennepin County) 55446; United States; 45.0455°N 93.4716°W

Information
- School type: Private, coeducational, Catholic, independent, college-preparatory
- Motto: Fides. Scientia. Virtus.; Faith. Knowledge. Virtue.
- Religious affiliation: Roman Catholic
- Denomination: Roman Catholic
- Established: 2001
- CEEB code: 242-021
- Chairperson: Robert Cummins
- Director: Sister Amelia, O.P.
- Headmaster: Todd Flanders
- Chaplain: Rev. Connor McGinnis
- Grades: PK–12
- Gender: Co-ed
- Age: Pre-K to 12th grade
- Enrollment: 946 (2023–2024)
- Classes: 7
- Average class size: 18
- Hours in school day: 6hr 45min
- Campus size: 41 acres
- Campus type: College-prep
- Colors: Navy blue and gold
- Athletics: 26 varsity sports
- Athletics conference: Independent Metro Athletic Conference (IMAC)
- Mascot: Lenny the Lion
- Team name: Lions
- Accreditation: Independent Schools Association of the Central States (ISACS)
- Newspaper: Providence Academy Word
- Website: www.providenceacademy.org

Providence Academy is a private, co-ed, Catholic college-preparatory PreK–12 school in Plymouth, Minnesota, United States, It was founded in 2001. It is located in and affiliated with the Archdiocese of Saint Paul and Minneapolis.

== History ==
At the end of the 1990s, Dan Frederick (former president of Alarmex), Bill Cooper (president of TCF Bank Minnesota), Bob Cummins (executive at Primera Technology), and other prominent businessmen in the Twin Cities area raised $20 million to fund a new private school "grounded in Judeo-Christian values". Not long after the announcement of its establishment, Providence became an official Catholic school associated with the Archdiocese of Saint Paul and Minneapolis. Ground was broken on March 25, 2000, and the school opened in September 2001.

In 2006, a $14 million, 95,000-square-foot addition added 16 new classrooms, including new engineering laboratories, a lecture hall, media center, and science and technology labs.

== Campus ==
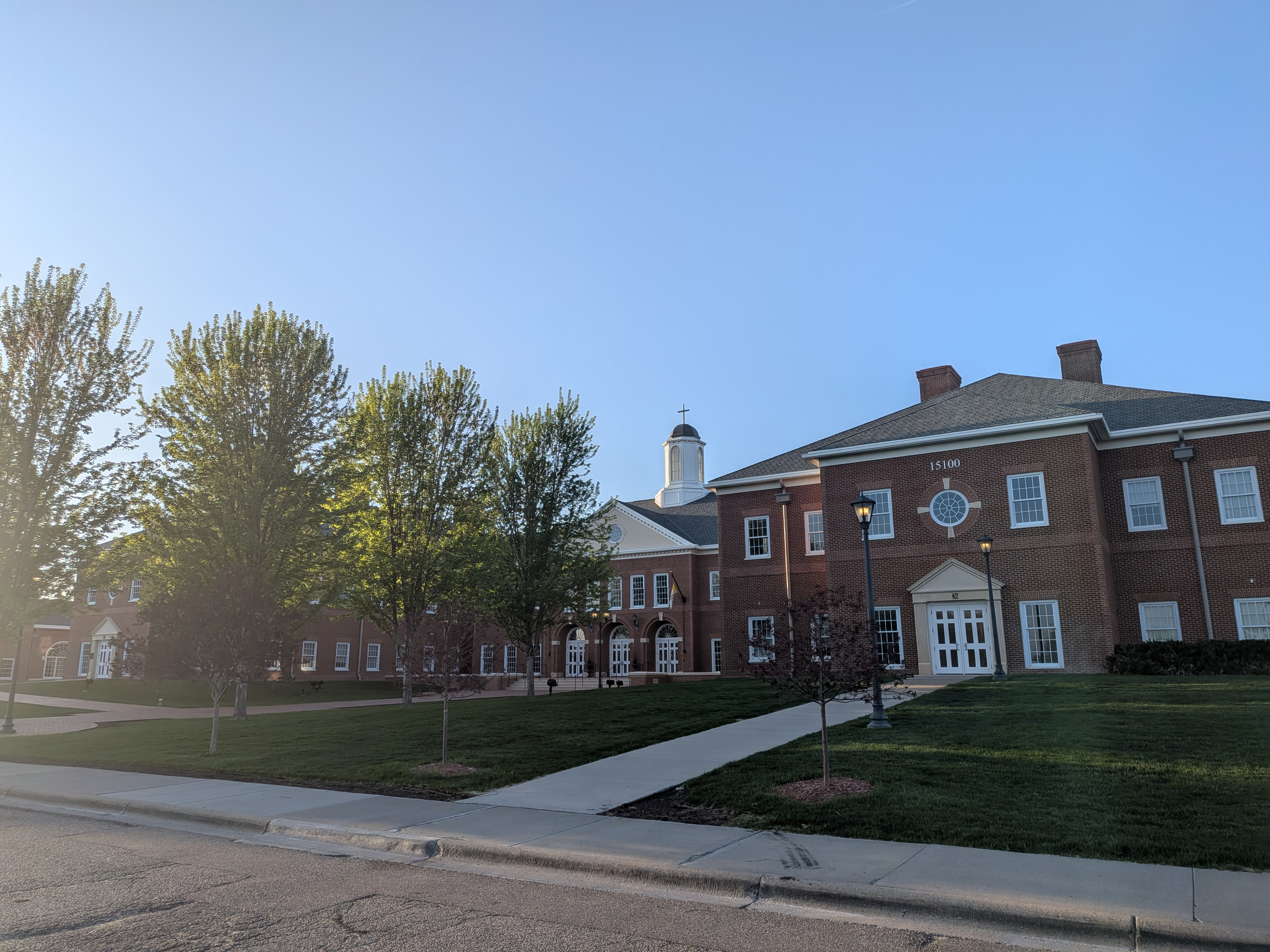
The main building

The buildings on the 41-acre campus are modeled on the campus of the College of William & Mary.

== Academics ==
With Saint Agnes School in Saint Paul, Providence is one of two K-12 Catholic schools in the Archdiocese of Saint Paul and Minneapolis. It is a college-prep school accredited by the Independent Schools Association of the Central States. The composite mean ACT score of the classes of 2021–2023 was 29, and 97% of graduates enrolled in four-year colleges.

== Athletics ==
Providence girls' basketball won the Class AA state tournament in 2012, 2022, 2023, 2024, 2025, and 2026. Girls' soccer won the Class A championship in 2024. Girls' Class A track and field won the state championship in 2008.

Providence provides the following athletic programs with the Minnesota State High School League:

Fall	Winter	Spring
Cross-country	Alpine skiing	Baseball
Football	Basketball	Shooting clays
Swim & dive	Dance (high kick and jazz)	Golf
Tennis	Hockey	Lacrosse
Volleyball	Nordic skiing	Robotics
	Swim & dive	Softball
	Wrestling	Tennis
		Track & field
		Volleyball

== Notable students/alumni ==
- Michael George, former Leprechaun for the University of Notre Dame 2011–2012
- Maddyn Greenway, daughter of Chad Greenway, now going to University Kentucky
- Ari Peterson, daughter of Adrian Peterson
- Louis Wehmann, NCAA hockey player at Cornell University (graduated 2024)
- Hope Counts, among her other Counts sisters, winning four state tournaments with PA is a Bison at Libscomb University, a D1 college in Nashville,TN
