= Illinois–Springfield Prairie Stars =

Intercollegiate sports teams of University of Illinois at Springfield

UIS Prairie Stars
- University: University of Illinois Springfield
- Conference: Great Lakes Valley Conference
- NCAA: Division II
- Athletic director: Mike Hermann
- Location: Springfield, Illinois
- Varsity teams: 17 (8 men’s and 9 women’s)
- Basketball arena: The Recreation and Athletic Center (TRAC)
- Baseball stadium: UIS Baseball Field
- Soccer stadium: Kiwanis Stadium
- Other venues: Land of Lincoln Softball Complex; Piper Glen Golf Course; UIS Cross Country Course; Velasco Tennis Center
- Mascot: Orion
- Nickname: Prairie Stars
- Colors: Navy, Vegas gold, and white
- Website: uisprairiestars.com

The UIS Prairie Stars (also Illinois Springfield Prairie Stars and formerly Sangamon State Prairie Stars) are the athletic teams that represent the University of Illinois Springfield, located in Springfield, Illinois, in intercollegiate sports as a member of the Division II level of the National Collegiate Athletic Association (NCAA), primarily competing in the Great Lakes Valley Conference (GLVC) since the 2009–10 academic year. UIS became a full-fledged Division II member on Aug 1, 2010. The Prairie Stars previously competed in the American Midwest Conference (AMC) of the National Association of Intercollegiate Athletics (NAIA) from 2003–04 to 2008–09.

== Varsity teams ==
Men's sports	Women's sports
Baseball	Basketball
Basketball	Cross country
Cross Country	Golf
Golf	Soccer
Soccer	Softball
Tennis	Tennis
Track and Field^{†}	Track and Field^{†}
	Volleyball
† – Track and field includes both indoor and outdoor.

The first four sports at Sangamon State University were men's soccer, women's volleyball and men's and women's tennis.

UIS competes in 17 intercollegiate varsity sports: Men's sports include baseball, basketball, cross country, golf, soccer, tennis and track & field (indoor and outdoor); while women's sports include basketball, cross country, golf, soccer, softball, tennis, track & field (indoor and outdoor) and volleyball.

== National championships ==
=== Team ===
Sport	Association	Division	Year	Opponent/Runner-up	Score
Men's soccer (3)	NAIA	Single	1986	Simon Fraser	1−0
Men's soccer (3)	NAIA	Single	1988	Alderson Broaddus	3−1
Men's soccer (3)	NAIA	Single	1993	Lynn	4−3 (aet)

== Individual programs ==
=== Baseball ===
Baseball has made five NCAA Tournament appearances since 2018, compiling a post-season record of 12–11. The Prairie Stars advanced to the Super Regional for the first time in 2019. In 2022, UIS won the GLVC Tournament, its first in program history, and then captured the NCAA Regional and Super Regional to advance to the NCAA College World Series. The program returned to the NCAA Tournament in 2023, playing in five straight postseason tourneys.

=== Men's Basketball ===
The Prairie Star men's basketball program started in 2002 under the direction of head coach Kevin Gamble, a 10-year NBA veteran who played six seasons for the Celtics. Gamble coached for eight seasons and twice was selected as the American Midwest Conference (AMC) Coach of the Year. Gamble coached seven seasons as an NAIA Division I member and the first year of NCAA Division II participation.

The program earned back-to-back postseason berths by winning the AMC tournament titles in 2006 and 2007, defeating McKendree in the championship game in both seasons. In 2006, the Prairie Stars lost the opening round game to #8 Oklahoma Baptist, who advanced to the national semifinals.

In 2007, UIS was seeded 15th in the NAIA tournament with a 22–8 record that included an 11–1 AMC record, winning the regular-season title, the tournament and recording the program's first NAIA tournament win, knocking off Lambuth, 105–89, before falling to eventual national champion Oklahoma City, 90–78, in the second round.

=== Women's Basketball ===
Women's basketball was started as the fifth sport in 1995, shortly after the university was acquired by University of Illinois. The program competed as an NAIA independent initially and won the Great Lakes Regional Tournament to advance to the NAIA Division II National Championship at the end of the 1997–98 season. The Prairie Stars lost an opening round game to Benedictine (Kan.) The university joined the American Midwest Conference in 2003.

=== Men's and Women's Cross Country, Indoor and Outdoor Track & Field ===
In its first season in 2015–16, men's and women's cross country and track & field, made a allegedly big impact in the first decade.

In cross country, the 2022 men's team won the GLVC championship, finished fifth in the NCAA regional and earned a spot in the national championship where the team rallied to finish sixth. Wyatt McIntyre placed 26th in that race, earning the program's first All-America recognition in men's cross country. In 2023, Cort Ross was named an All-American after winning the GLVC title and finishing 18th in the NCAA National Championship, the top UIS individual finish to date.

In women's cross country, Taryn Christy was the program's first national qualifier, earning All-America honors in 2019 as a sophomore. She returned to the event in 2021.

In women's indoor track, Christy was also the first runner to qualify for the NCAA Indoor Track Championships. In 2020, she qualified in the 5,000-meter run and was recognized as an All-American in the COVID impacted championships. In 2022, she returned, qualifying in both the 3,000- and 5,000-meter runs. Maddie Miller Ross was the second Prairie Star All-American in the sport, competing in the 5,000-meter run in 2025 where she finished 10th and earned Second Team All-America honors.

For the men indoors, Blake Jones is the first Star to earn All-America honors with a 12th-place finish in the 5,000-meter run in 2021, good for second-team recognition.

In men's outdoor track, Jones recorded the program's top performance at the NCAA Championships to date with a third-place finish in the 5,000-meter run in 2021. The six-time GLVC champion was a four-time national qualifier, making it to the national meet in indoor, outdoor and cross country.

In women's outdoor, Christy again was the first to receive an All-America plaque with a 12th-place finish in the 2021 NCAA Championships, earning second team recognition.

=== Men's and Women's Golf ===
The women's golf program earned its first NCAA regional bid in 2016 after a third-place finish in the GLVC. In the last three seasons, the program has earned three consecutive NCAA regional berths (2023, 2024, 2025). In 2023, the Prairie Stars rallied as the #3 seed in match play to win the GLVC Championship and earn an automatic berth in the regional. The team finished eighth and top player Heather McLean advanced to the NCAA Championship as an individual, where she finished 82nd. UIS earned an at-large berth in 2024, finishing 14th in the field with sophomore Elaine Grant advancing to the national championship, where she finished 63rd. The team finished 17th in the regional in 2025.

Two UIS women were selected as individuals for regionals: Jennifer Queller (2019) and Madison DeRousse (2022).

On the men's side, first Star to earn a national championship berth was two-time GLVC runner-up Talon Supak, who won the 2016 Midwest Regional with a three-round total of a five-over-par 218 (70–71–77) and advanced to the nationals. He finished tied for 79th at the NCAA Championship where he carded a 226 (75–76–75). He was selected as an individual to the regional again in 2017 after recording seven top-10 finishes. He finished fourth at the 2017 regional with a 203 (69–70–64) but did not advance.

=== Men's Soccer ===
Men's soccer advanced to the NCAA Tournament in the last three seasons, advancing to the third round in 2021 and 2022. The Prairie Stars won the 2023 GLVC regular-season title with a 10–0–3 conference mark.

While a member of the NAIA, the Prairie Stars won the NAIA national men's soccer championship in 1986, 1988, and 1993 and were runner-up in 1998. The Prairie Stars were dominant from 1979 to 2002, earning 20 NAIA postseason bids in the 24-year stretch and compiling a 27-18-8 tournament mark. The program made nine appearances in the national semifinals, including four appearances in the championship match. The 1979, 1980 and 1981 NAIA national championships were played on campus at Kiwanis Stadium.

=== Softball ===
Softball has made four NCAA Tournament appearances, including three under current head coach Shannon Guthrie, advancing in 2018, 2019 and 2023. In 2018, the Prairie Stars won the Regional and advanced to the Super Regional. The program was the first UIS sport to earn an NCAA bid when it advanced in 2012 after winning a GLVC division championship and finishing second in the GLVC Tournament.

=== Men's and Women's Tennis ===
The tennis program was fortunate to have two legendary coaches, both UIS Hall of Famers. Manny Velasco coached the men's program for 30 seasons, from 1985 to 2014. He oversaw both the men's and women's programs in his final eight seasons. He led the team to the NAIA national championship competition in 2000, the first year for the team championship in the sport.

Dominic Giacomini coached the women's squad from 1991 to 2006. The NAIA started team play for tennis in 2000 and the Prairie Star women's program advanced to the national tournament in 2000 and 2004.

Men's tennis earned its first NCAA berth in 2021, but did not participate due to a COVID-19.

=== Volleyball ===
Women's volleyball earned its first NCAA berth in 2018.
