= Mike Hermann (athletic director) =

American college athletics administrator

Current position
- Title: Athletic director
- Team: UIS
- Conference: GLVC

Biographical details
- Education: John Carroll University, Kent State University

Administrative career (AD unless noted)
- 1982–1984: Kent State (GA)
- 1984–1988: Wright State (SID)
- 1989–1993: MCC (assistant commissioner)
- 1993–1998: Xavier (associate AD)
- 1998–2006: Niagara
- 2006–2010: Towson
- 2010–2013: Seattle (associate AD)
- 2013–2019: Kansas Wesleyan
- 2019–2020: Old Dominion (senior associate AD)
- 2020–2021: Norfolk State (senior associate AD)
- 2021–2024: Pacific (senior associate AD)
- 2024–present: UIS

Mike Hermann is an American college athletics administrator currently serving as director of athletics at University of Illinois Springfield, named to this role in 2024.

He previously served as director of athletics for Niagara University from 1998 to 2006, Towson University from 2006 to 2010, and Kansas Wesleyan University from 2013 to 2019. At Kansas Wesleyan, Hermann was promoted to vice president in 2016. He was named a 2018-19 Under Armour AD of the Year award recipient from the National Association of College Directors of Athletics (NACDA) and was selected as the 2018-19 Kansas Collegiate Athletic Conference Athletics Director of the Year.

Hermann also served as associate athletic director at Xavier University from 1993 to 1998, and Seattle University from 2010 to 2013. He was senior associate athletic director at Old Dominion University, Norfolk State University and University of the Pacific.

Hermann graduated from John Carroll University with a bachelor's degree in 1982, and Kent State University with a master's degree in 1984. He started his athletics career as the sports information director at Wright State University and as assistant commissioner in the Midwestern Collegiate Conference (now Horizon League) office.
