= Mike Hermann (American football) =

American football player

Profile
- Position: Quarterback

Personal information
- Born: Sydney, Australia
- Listed height: 6 ft 6 in (1.98 m)
- Listed weight: 250 lb (113 kg)

Career information
- High school: Hilton Head Prep (Hilton Head, sc)
- College: Rensselaer Polytechnic Institute
- NFL draft: 2013: undrafted

Career history
- San Diego Chargers (2013)*
- * Offseason or practice squad member only

Mike Hermann is a former American football quarterback. He played college football at Rensselaer Polytechnic Institute.

== Early life and college ==
Mike ( Michael Alexander) Hermann was born in Australia of an American father and a New Zealand Maori mother. He came to the United States as an infant. He was a standout at Hilton Head Prep school in basketball and football. He also attended Avon Old Farms school for his post year of high school where he played football and basketball. He attended and played for Rensselaer Polytechnic Institute from 2009 to 2013. He was named offensive player of the year of Liberty League in 2011 and 2012.

== Professional career ==
On May 3, 2013, Hermann signed with the San Diego Chargers as an undrafted free agent. Hermann was later cut by the San Diego Chargers.
