= Jordan Lee (basketball) =

American basketball player

South Carolina Gamecocks
- Position: Guard
- Conference: Southeastern Conference

Personal information
- Born: July 30, 2006 (age 20)
- Listed height: 6 ft 0 in (1.83 m)

Career information
- High school: Saint Mary's (Stockton, California)
- College: Texas (2024–2026); South Carolina (2026–present)

Career highlights
- SEC All-Freshman Team (2025); McDonald's All-American (2024); Nike Hoop Summit (2024)
Medals
Women's basketball
Representing the United States
FIBA Under-19 World Cup
Gold medal – first place	2025 Czech Republic
FIBA Under-18 Americas Championship
Gold medal – first place	2024 Colombia	Team

Jordan Lee (born July 30, 2006) is an American college basketball player for the South Carolina Gamecocks of the Southeastern Conference (SEC).

== High school career ==
Lee played basketball for Saint Mary's in Stockton. She was a two-time first-team All-State selection. Lee participated in Curry Camp, an off-season training program run by Stephen Curry, winning MVP. In her junior year, she averaged 20.1 points, 7.4 rebounds, and 2.7 assists per game. She was selected for the McDonald's All-American game and the Nike Hoop Summit in 2024. Lee was rated a five-star recruit and the number 9 player in the class of 2024 by ESPN. On September 22, 2023, she committed to Texas, citing its academic program.

== College career ==
In her freshman year, Lee played in 40 games, starting in five. She scored a season-high 20 points against James Madison on December 8, 2024. She was named the USBWA National Freshman of the Week on January 7, 2025, when she averaged 15 points across two games. In the postseason, Lee was named on the All-SEC Freshman Team. In the NCAA Tournament, she scored 13 points against Tennessee in the Elite Eight, and scored 16 points against South Carolina in the Final Four.

On April 8, 2026, Lee officially entered the transfer portal out of Texas. After taking a visit to South Carolina on April 14, Lee committed to the Gamecocks on April 16.

== National team career ==
Lee played for the United States national under-17 team at the 2024 FIBA Under-18 Women's AmeriCup in Columbia. She averaged 7.5 points, 4.3 rebounds, and 2.7 assists en route to a gold medal. She won a second gold medal at the 2025 FIBA Under-19 Women's World Cup in the Czech Republic, averaging 6.7 points, 4.0 rebounds and 2.7 assists as a starter.

== Career statistics ==
Legend
GP	Games played	GS	Games started	MPG	Minutes per game	RPG	Rebounds per game
APG	Assists per game	SPG	Steals per game	BPG	Blocks per game	PPG	Points per game
TO	Turnovers per game	FG%	Field-goal percentage	3P%	3-point field-goal percentage	FT%	Free-throw percentage
**Bold**	Career best	°	League leader

Year	Team	GP	GS	MPG	FG%	3P%	FT%	RPG	APG	SPG	BPG	TO	PPG
2024–25	Texas	39	5	19.9	40.8	**39.3**	70.0	1.5	1.2	0.6	0.2	0.9	5.8
2025–26	Texas	39	**38**	**31.7**	**42.2**	34.8	**75.0**	**2.5**	**2.5**	**1.5**	**0.5**	**1.4**	**13.2**
Career		78	43	25.8	41.5	37.1	72.5	2.0	1.9	1.1	0.4	1.2	9.5
Statistics retrieved from Sports-Reference.
