= Lieber Correctional Institution =

Maximum-security state prison for men in Ridgeville, Dorchester County, South Carolina

Coordinates: 33°05′09″N 80°17′27″W

- Interactive map of Lieber Correctional Institution
- Location: 136 Wilborn Avenue Ridgeville, South Carolina
- Status: Maximum
- Capacity: 1488
- Opened: 1986
- Managed by: South Carolina Department of Corrections

The Lieber Correctional Institution is a maximum-security state prison for men located in Ridgeville, Dorchester County, South Carolina, owned and operated by the South Carolina Department of Corrections.

The facility was opened in 1986 and has a capacity of 1488 inmates held at maximum security. Lieber has housed South Carolina's death row from April 12, 1997, when they were moved from Broad River Correctional Institution, until September 2017, when it was moved to Kirkland Correctional Institution.

== Notable inmates ==
Inmate Name	Register Number	Status	Details
Todd Kohlhepp	00372454 / SC02268108	Serving a life sentence without parole.	Serial Killer who originally murdered 4 people at a bike shop in 2003, but was not caught for this. In 2016, Kohlhepp was arrested after Kate Brown, a lady he kidnapped, was found chained up on his property, which led to the discovery of the bodies of a married couple, and Brown's boyfriend. Kohlhepp was then charged and convicted of all 7 murders.
Dave Meggett	00343610	Serving a 30 year sentence for burglary and criminal sexual assault.	Former all-pro NFL player for the New York Giants, New England Patriots, and New York Jets. He was sentenced to prison for raping and robbing a College of Charleston student. He had previously served two years of probation for misdemeanor sexual battery.
Raymond Moody	00389275	Serving a life sentence. Was also sentenced to two consecutive 30-year sentences for the charges of criminal sexual assault and kidnapping.	Murdered Brittanee Drexel in April 2009 while she was on spring break in Myrtle Beach.
Jesse Dewitt Osborne	00382777 / SC02381155	Serving two life sentences, later changed to two 75-year sentences. Scheduled for release in 2094.	Perpetrator of the 2016 Townville Elementary School shooting in which he murdered his father, before driving to the previously mentioned school, and murdered student Jacob Hall.
Nathaniel David Rowland	00386010 / SC02345739	Serving a life sentence.	Perpetrator of the 2019 Murder of Samantha Josephson in which she mistakenly thought she entered an Uber vehicle and Bowland proceeded to brutally stab her over 100 times.

== See also ==
- List of South Carolina state prisons
