= Vinson Filyaw =

American kidnapper, rapist, and construction worker (1969–2021)

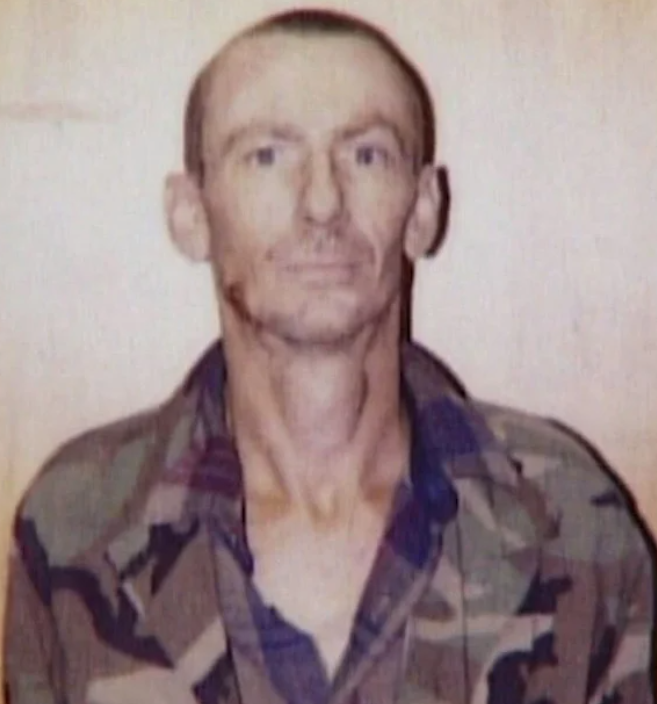
- Filyaw after his arrest in 2006
- Born: Vinson Wayne Filyaw; December 15, 1969; United States
- Died: May 3, 2021 (aged 51); McCormick, South Carolina, U.S.
- Occupation: Construction worker
- Status: Deceased
- Convictions: Kidnapping; First-degree criminal sexual assault Second degree sexual assault x2 Possession of explosives Attempted armed robbery Impersonating a police officer
- Penalty: 421 years

Details
- Imprisoned at: McCormick Correctional Institution

Vinson Wayne Filyaw (December 15, 1969 – May 3, 2021) was an American rapist, abductor, and former construction worker. He was convicted of the 2006 kidnapping and rape of 14-year-old Elizabeth Shoaf in Lugoff, South Carolina. Filyaw had held Shoaf hostage inside an underground bunker for ten days before Shoaf alerted her mother via text message from Filyaw's phone. Filyaw turned himself in to police a day after Shoaf was rescued. He was sentenced to 421 years imprisonment in 2007 and died at McCormick Correctional Institution in 2021.

The case was fictionalized in the 2018 television movie Girl in the Bunker.

== Background ==
Prior to the abduction, Filyaw was unemployed and had been wanted on a warrant for sexual misconduct since November 2005. The 12-year-old daughter of Filyaw's girlfriend accused him of drugging her with Benadryl in order to molest the girl in her sleep. He eluded authorities by hiding in a network of underground tunnels he had dug in the woods around Lugoff. Filyaw claimed that he planned the rape of another underaged girl in order to "embarrass" the Kershaw County Sheriff's Office, having felt mistreated by police during the investigation.

== Kidnapping ==
On September 6, 2006, Elizabeth Shoaf was kidnapped after she got off her school bus, around 400 metres from her home. Filyaw approached Shoaf and, posing as a police officer, he claimed that her parents were illegally growing marijuana and that she was being put under arrest. After handcuffing Shoaf, Filyaw took her into the woods and raped her. He then walked Shoaf around until she became disoriented and marched her to an 8x8 ft makeshift underground bunker, located within a mile of her own home.

Once inside, he stripped her naked, restrained her with chains, and raped her several times a day over the duration of her 10-day captivity. Police initially interpreted her disappearance as a runaway, and did not launch an Amber alert. Shoaf's poise and calm while she was held captive was considered remarkable by people involved with missing children cases. "Not only was she very brave, she was also very smart and did several things that greatly improved her chances of survival," said Captain David Thomley of the Kershaw County Sheriff’s Department.

- While being led into the woods, she dropped her shoes in the hope that it would provide a clue for someone who was searching for her.
- Despite receiving ongoing death threats and having explosives hung around her neck, she "would talk with him about things that interested him, which in his eyes, made her a person, not just a captive. She began to gain his trust."
- After continuing to gain his trust, she was allowed out of the bunker, and would "pull out strands of her hair [and] lay them on branches hoping search dogs might pick up her scent."

After 10 days in captivity, the victim convinced Filyaw to let her borrow his cellular phone to play games, but she had an entirely different use in mind. Once he fell asleep, she texted her mother and friends, who contacted the police. Before the police could triangulate the phone number, Sheriff Steve McCaskill thought that the text was a hoax. The former girlfriend who made the call to Kershaw County's Department of Social Services passed on Filyaw's cell phone number to the police. The authorities then began to triangulate the bunker's position through local cell phone towers.

Officer Dave Thomley did not know that Elizabeth Shoaf was underground in a bunker until Filyaw's former girlfriend showed them the first bunker he built. Thomley initially thought that it was a trash pit. Filyaw learned that he was being pursued when he watched the news on a battery-powered television in the bunker. He asked Shoaf for advice and she suggested he ought to run away to avoid capture. He left and the next morning Shoaf left the bunker and called for help until she was found by a rescue team. Filyaw had booby-trapped the entrance of the bunker with explosives.

== Arrest ==
On September 17, 2006, Filyaw surrendered to police on Interstate 20 in Richland County, five miles from his house. He was carrying a taser, pellet gun, and knife, when he was arrested. He was charged with kidnapping, ten counts of criminal sexual misconduct, possession of an incendiary device (a flare gun), and impersonating a police officer. During the year before his trial date, Filyaw issued a full written confession detailing the planning of the abduction and the rapes.

Filyaw's girlfriend Cynthia Hall and his mother Ginger Nell Cobb were also arrested the same week. They faced charges related to suspected aiding of Filyaw during his flight from police by providing him with food and other supplies up until his arrest. Hall was charged as an accessory in Shoaf's abduction and also facing trial as an accessory for neglect in the case of Filyaw's molestation of her daughter.

== Trial and imprisonment ==
Filyaw's charges amounted to the following:

- Impersonating a law enforcement officer (1 year)
- Two counts of possession of explosives (15 years each; 30 years total)
- Second-degree criminal sexual conduct with a minor (20 years)
- Attempted armed robbery (20 years)
- 10 first-degree counts of criminal sexual conduct (30 years each; 300 years total)
- Kidnapping (30 years)

Additionally, Filyaw was separately convicted of first-degree criminal sexual conduct with a minor for his outstanding warrant, for which he received 20 years imprisonment.

Filyaw pleaded guilty to all counts just before the start of the trial. The victim, Shoaf, was too emotional to testify, but a prepared statement was read by her attorney and she later made a public statement. As all his sentences were to be served consecutively, Filyaw was sentenced 421 years in prison without possibility of parole on September 19, 2007, by Circuit Judge G. Thomas Cooper; one year was already served for his time in jail. It was the maximum penalty under South Carolina law. He was incarcerated at the Maximum Security Unit at Kirkland Correctional Institution.

== Death ==
Filyaw died in prison at McCormick Correctional Institution on May 3, 2021, at the age of 51. His cause of death was listed as natural causes.

== Legacy ==
Due to being underage at the time, Shoaf remained unnamed in media reports until she voluntarily identified herself following Filyaw's conviction in 2008. Shoaf later made several media appearances, including a 2008 episode of the Today show, on which Meredith Vieira did a profile of Shoaf and her family, commenting on her calmness throughout such a horrific event. The story aired on Dateline NBC on March 7, 2008. Filyaw's interaction with Shoaf was also explored on the "Underground Terror" episode of Investigation Discovery's Surviving Evil series, hosted by fellow crime survivor Charisma Carpenter, on September 9, 2013.

The entire ordeal was dramatized in the Lifetime movie Girl in the Bunker, which premiered on May 28, 2018. The film starred Julia LaLonde as Elizabeth Shoaf, Henry Thomas as Vinson Filyaw, and Moira Kelly as Madeline Shoaf, Elizabeth's mother.
