= New Zion, South Carolina =

- Unincorporated community
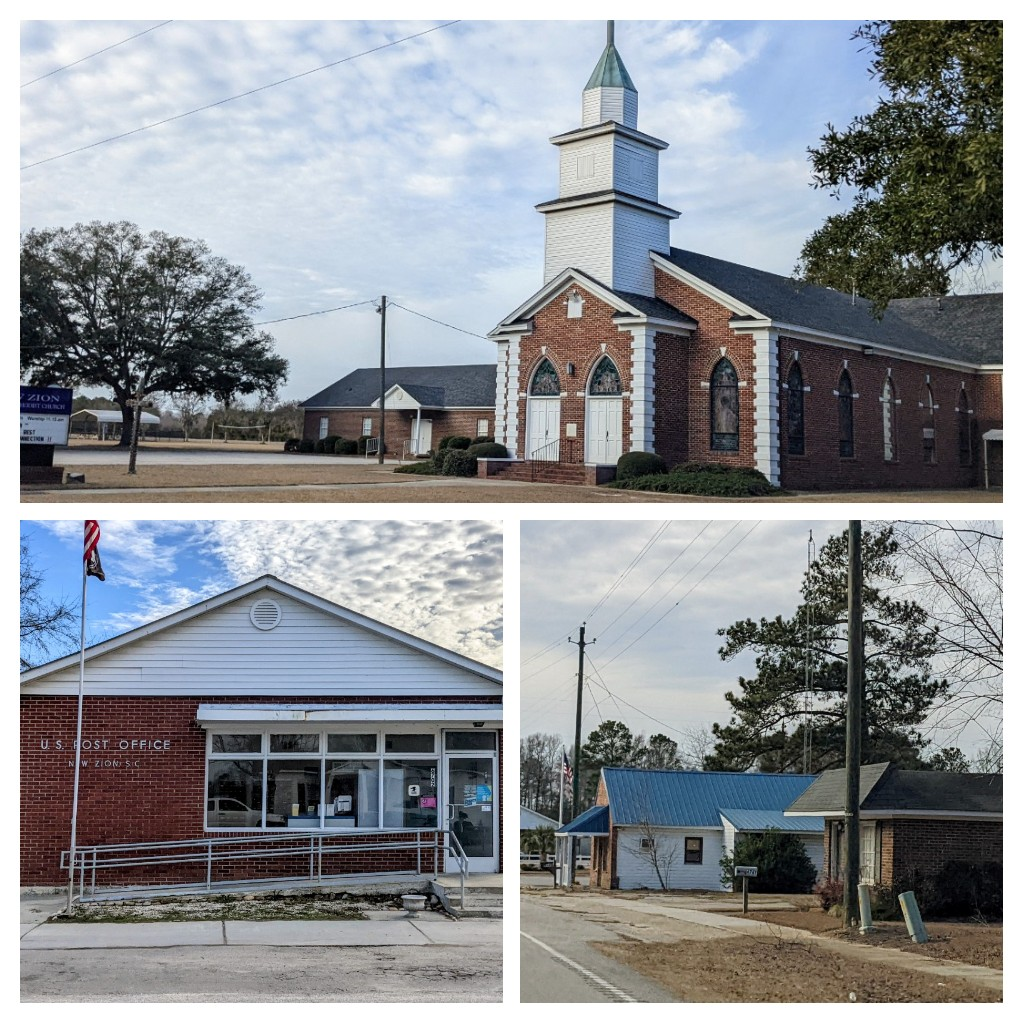

- Location within South Carolina Location within the United States
- Coordinates: 33°50′40″N 80°01′45″W
- Country: United States
- State: South Carolina
- County: Clarendon
- Elevation: 102 ft (31 m)
- Time zone: UTC-5 (Eastern (EST))
  - Summer (DST): UTC-4 (EDT)
- ZIP code: 29111
- Area codes: 803, 839
- GNIS feature ID: 1225029

New Zion is an unincorporated community in Clarendon County, South Carolina, United States. The community is located along Puddin Swamp, 3.3 miles (5.3 km) south of Turbeville. New Zion has a post office with ZIP code 29111, which opened on March 25, 1852.

== Education ==
The town currently has one public school: Walker-Gamble Elementary School, which is part of the Clarendon County School District Four system.

The town previously had four schools; two segregated public high schools, one all-white elementary school and one all-white private school.

Salem High School (an all-white school) was established in 1929 and operated until 1949, when it consolidated with nearby Gable, South Carolina's high school to create Black River High School. The majority of Salem's students were transferred to there. The building sat vacant until September of 1952 when it was established as New Zion Elementary School. The all-white elementary school operated until the end of the 1965-1966 school session when then-Clarendon County School District Three consolidated its students, administration, faculty and staff with nearby Turbeville Elementary School to establish the East Clarendon Elementary School.

Walker-Gamble High School (an all-black school) was established in 1953 after the consolidation of ten different local church-run schoolhouses and operated until 1970 when it integrated with East Clarendon High School following the Brown v. Board of Education ruling.

In the summer of 1970, Salem Schools, Incorporated (locally nicknamed as "Salem Academy") was established by local politicians and farmers at the former New Zion Elementary School building in response to the mandatory court-ruling. The school's colors were green and gold and its school mascot was the eagle. The school's sports included baseball, basketball, football, softball and volleyball. The majority of its first-enrolled students originated from Turbeville, South Carolina's East Clarendon High School. It was in active operation until the end of the 1985-1986 school session, when it was closed permanently due to both rising maintenance costs and low enrollment numbers. The school building was demolished a few years later and replaced with a superette that was made out of the salvaged bricks. Its sports

== Religion ==
There are a total of six Christian Protestant churches within the community of New Zion:

- Howard Chapel African Methodist Episcopal Church
- Lodabar African Methodist Episcopal Church
- McKenzie Tabernacle Pentecostal Holiness Church
- Midway Presbyterian Church
- New Zion Methodist Church
- Union Crossroads Baptist Church

== Media ==
On the afternoon of March 29, 2019, a pair of turkey hunters were scouting a cornfield when they discovered the body of 21-year-old Samantha Josephson, a student at the University of South Carolina that was last seen earlier that morning outside of a bar in downtown Columbia, South Carolina stepping into a black car that she thought was the Uber ride that she had ordered. The following day, 24-year-old Nathaniel David Rowland, a town resident, was arrested and charged with her kidnapping and murder after Clarendon County police had pulled him over to inspect his car that appeared to match the given description of the other car. On July 27, 2021, he was found guilty for both offenses and was sentenced to life in prison.

The incident had not only attracted national attention and led to discussion about the dangers of ridesharing and the importance of ensuring that a rideshare car is being driven by a registered driver prior to entering, but it had led to the creation of Sami's Law in her native New Jersey.

== Notable people ==
- Marie Deans (1940-2011) - Anti-death penalty activist
- Nathaniel Rowland (1994–present) - Murderer of Samantha Josephson
