= Richard Valenti =

American convicted serial killer (1943–2020)

- 1974 mugshot of Valenti at the time of his arrest
- Born: Richard Raymond Valenti; January 8, 1943; New York City, New York, U.S.
- Died: December 16, 2020 (aged 77); Columbia, South Carolina, U.S.
- Status: Died while incarcerated
- Conviction: Two counts of murder
- Penalty: Two consecutive terms of life imprisonment (June 27, 1974)

Details
- Victims: 3 murdered, 5+ survived
- Date: 1973–1974
- Country: United States
- State: South Carolina
- Imprisoned at: Kirkland Correctional Institution

Richard Raymond Valenti (January 8, 1943 – December 16, 2020) was an American serial killer convicted of two murders in South Carolina. Between 1973 and 1974, Valenti killed three teenage girls in Folly Beach, South Carolina, by kidnapping them and strangling them to death. Valenti was charged with murdering two of the girls, 13-year-old Alexis Ann Latimer and 14-year-old Sheri Jan Clark, and sentenced to life imprisonment, and he also confessed to killing 16-year-old Mary Earline Bunch, his third confirmed victim. Valenti, who was denied parole multiple times throughout his incarceration, died of natural causes in prison in 2020, 47 years after his first murder.

== Personal life ==
Richard Raymond Valenti, born on January 8, 1943, was a native of New York City and resided in Boston. While details of his life were not largely known, Valenti was married with one daughter and two step-sons, and he served eight years in the U.S. Navy from 1966 to 1974. Valenti was previously deployed to sea between November 1966 and April 1969, and starting from May 1972 until April 1974, he was transferred to Charleston, South Carolina, to serve as a crew member of the USS Petrel.

== Murders ==
Between 1973 and 1974, Valenti abducted and murdered three teenage girls in Folly Beach, South Carolina. Valenti also non-fatally attacked at least five other teenage girls and young women.

=== Sheri Jan Clark and Alexis Ann Latimer ===
On May 23, 1973, 13-year-old Alexis Ann Latimer and 14-year-old Sheri Jan Clark disappeared after they both went out together for a walk on Folly Beach. After the girls disappeared, their families reported the duo missing, but the police initially believed that they were runaways. Ultimately, 2 1/2 weeks after the girls went missing, the Charleston County Police Department began to investigate the disappearances of Latimer and Clark. A reward of $1,000 was offered for any tips that could lead to their location.

On the day they went missing, both Latimer and Clark encountered Valenti, who kidnapped the girls at gunpoint and forced them into an abandoned shower house. Valenti, then stationed at Charleston Naval Shipyard, bound and gagged both the girls, before he used rope to hang them by their necks to overhead water pipes in a shower stall and even kicked off the chairs they were standing on, leading to the girls to die by hanging as Valenti watched on.

After the girls were hung to death, Valenti buried their bodies in the sand dunes nearby his house. Both the girls' corpses were not found until a year later in April 1974, the same month he was arrested for the murders. According to Dr. Sandra Conradi, a spokesperson for the Charleston County Coroner's Office, the girls died as a result of asphyxia caused by hanging.

=== Mary Earline Bunch ===
On February 20, 1974, 16-year-old Mary Earline Bunch, the daughter of former Folly Beach police chief Julian M. Bunch, disappeared in Folly Beach, after she was abducted by Valenti. While the exact details behind her abduction and murder were not publicly known, the police revealed publicly that Bunch was also being strangled to death in the same manner as both Alexis Latimer and Sheri Clark, and her body was buried in the same sand dunes as the first two victims, before it was discovered two months later in April 1974. According to an autopsy report, the cause of Bunch's death was asphyxia caused by both deep gag and a ligature (possibly a rope or similar material) around the neck.

== Murder charges and trial ==
On April 16, 1974, Richard Valenti was arrested for an unrelated charge of assault, which was related to an incident in September 1973, when Valenti forcibly held a woman at a vacant house and made her partially strip herself. After his arrest, Valenti admitted to the police about the three murders of Mary Bunch, Sheri Clark and Alexis Latimer, and also led them to the sand dunes where he buried their bodies. The identities of the girls were established through X-rays and dental records, and the parents of both Latimer and Clark were able to identify their daughters based on the girls' personal effects discovered at the grave, including a necklace, a ring and a pair of earrings.

On April 18, 1974, Valenti was charged with three counts of murder, and six counts of assault for attacking other girls in Folly Beach. In one of these cases, Valenti abducted three girls from Summerville on April 12, 1974, and the trio were found gagged and bound but otherwise unharmed under a house in Folly Beach, while in another case, Valenti abducted a girl on February 12, 1974, before she was found tied to a tree but alive in James Island.

On April 21, 1974, Valenti was ordered to undergo pre-trial psychiatric evaluation while in remand pending trial for the serial murder.

On May 27, 1974, a Charleston County grand jury formally indicted Valenti for the murders of Latimer, Bunch and Clark, as well as two of the assaults linked to him.

Valenti stood trial in June 1974 for the two murders of Latimer and Clark, but not for the third charge of murder in Bunch's death. He was set to stand trial for Bunch's killing in a separate court. During the trial, Valenti's wife testified that her husband developed a sexual fetish of binding girls after coming across pornographic material depicting these sexual fetishes, and according to a psychiatrist, Valenti was diagnosed with a form of "sexual deviant character disorder".

On June 27, 1974, Valenti was found guilty of both the murders of Clark and Latimer. On that same day, Valenti was sentenced to two consecutive life sentences for the double murder. At that time of Valenti's conviction in 1974, capital punishment in South Carolina was suspended due to the 1972 landmark case of Furman v. Georgia, and the moratorium was eventually overturned in 1976, and the state of South Carolina revived the death penalty in 1977.

== Post-conviction proceedings ==
=== Appeal ===
On June 10, 1975, Richard Valenti filed an appeal to the South Carolina Supreme Court against his conviction and sentence, and the defence argued that Valenti was mentally ill and he was also unable to differentiate right from wrong, and that he should have been found not guilty by reason of insanity.

On October 6, 1975, the South Carolina Supreme Court unanimously rejected Valenti's appeal and further denied his request for a new trial, after they found no merit in his grounds of appeal and also no reason to remand his case for another trial in their six-page opinion.

=== 1985 revival of third murder charge ===
On March 7, 1985, while he was serving his life sentences at the Kirkland Correctional Institution, Valenti was arraigned in court and had his third murder charge reinstated for the 1974 killing of Mary Earline Bunch, 11 years after it was committed. He was also charged with eight additional counts for unrelated attacks on other women, including first-degree criminal sexual assault of a woman in September 1973 and attempted assault with intent to kill another woman in February 1974. Should Valenti was given a third life sentence for the murder of Bunch, he would only be eligible for parole after serving a minimum of 20 years rather than the old minimum period of ten years.

On August 7, 1985, a Charleston County grand jury formally indicted Valenti for the murder of Bunch.

On January 14, 1986, Circuit Judge William Byrd Traxler Jr. dismissed the third murder charge against Valenti, ruling that there was no valid reason for the prosecution to delay the trial of Valenti for Bunch's murder, which denied him his constitutional rights to both due process and a speedy trial. It was revealed that Valenti sought to be tried for the killing of Bunch back in 1975, but the prosecution did not go ahead with his request on account of judicial economy and hence a majority of the evidence in the Bunch case were later destroyed. According to the defence, this development of events would have made it impossible for Valenti to receive a fair trial for the third charge of murdering Bunch.

== Imprisonment and death ==
After his sentencing in 1974, Richard Valenti was incarcerated at the Kirkland Correctional Institution. Under the laws which Valenti was convicted back then, he was eligible for the possibility of parole after a minimum of ten years, although a 1977 law doubled the minimum period to 20 years for life sentence prisoners convicted under this particular new law. Valenti was eligible to be reviewed for parole earliest in December 1983 or January 1984, and if his first bid for parole was rejected, he would be periodically reviewed every year for parole in subsequent hearings.

In November 1983, the 9th Circuit Solicitor's Office expressed their opposition to the possibility of parole for Valenti, and similarly, the families of both Alexis Latimer and Sheri Clark also objected to releasing Valenti from prison. On February 8, 1984, Valenti was denied parole for the first time.

The following year, in February 1985, Valenti's second parole hearing was scheduled that same month, and the parents of one of his victims submitted a petition with 5,000 signatures to oppose parole for their daughter's killer. On February 27, 1985, Valenti was denied parole for the second time by the parole board.

The third parole hearing was carried out in March 1986, and Valenti was denied parole that same month. Subsequently, Valenti waived his rights to a parole hearing in 1987 and 1989 respectively, before he attended his sixth parole hearing in September 1990. However, the parole board rejected his plea on September 20, 1990.

Two years later, on September 28, 1992, Valenti was once again reviewed for parole for the seventh time, but two days later, on September 30, 1992, Valenti was denied parole once again. Valenti was one of four convicted murderers under life terms who had their parole applications rejected. Valenti's eighth parole hearing was set in September 1994, but he declined to seek parole and waived his right to a hearing that same year. Valenti would attend his ninth parole hearing in October 1997, which similarly ended with the rejection of his parole.

Between 1997 and 2007, Valenti would lose another five attempts to get parole. On January 2, 2008, Valenti was denied parole for the 15th time. Two years later, in 2010, Valenti was again denied parole for the 16th time. On January 11, 2012, Valenti waived his right to a parole hearing, and as a result, his parole was declined for the 17th time. On April 26, 2014, Valenti was reviewed for parole for the 18th time, and on April 29, 2014, the state parole board decided to not grant parole for Valenti. On July 20, 2016, Valenti was denied parole for the 19th time. Clark's sister reportedly submitted a petition with 8,000 signatures opposing the release of Valenti to the parole board during the hearing itself.

Valenti's next parole hearing was scheduled for October 2018. Subsequently, during the hearing on October 10, 2018, Alexis Latimer's mother, who was accompanied by Sheri Clark's sister and several other supporters, appealed to the parole board to continue keeping Valenti in prison until his death, and Valenti, who was then serving time to the Lee Correctional Institution, appealed to the panel to release him by professing he was saved by God and was no longer a danger to society. Immediately after Valenti made his plea to the board, the panel unanimously voted to refuse Valenti parole for the 20th time.

On October 15, 2020, it was reported that Valenti would be considered for parole for the 21st time later that month, and there were thousands of people signing a petition opposing his parole, which was started by a sister of one of his victims. On October 28, 2020, by a unanimous decision, the state parole board denied parole for Valenti for the 21st time.

On December 16, 2020, two months after being denied parole, Richard Valenti died of natural causes at the age of 77. At the time of his death, Valenti was incarcerated for more than 46 years. According to the news reports covering his death, Valenti was transferred out of Kirkland Correctional Institution and sent to a local hospital for an illness on November 18, 2020, and he remained hospitalized until his death. The South Carolina Department of Corrections verified that the illness was not related to COVID-19. According to Alexis Latimer's mother, she was relieved to hear that Valenti died in prison, because she and the other surviving kin of the victims would not need to endure another parole hearing and relive the pain of losing her daughter.

== Aftermath ==
Richard Valenti was remembered as one of the most notorious serial killers in South Carolina.

In 2019, true crime series Buried In The Backyard re-enacted the Valenti serial murders and the case was featured on the seventh episode of the show's second season.

== See also ==
- List of serial killers in the United States
