= Dave Meggett =

American football player (born 1966)

No. 30, 22
- Position: Running back

Personal information
- Born: April 30, 1966 (age 60); Charleston, South Carolina, U.S.
- Listed height: 5 ft 7 in (1.70 m)
- Listed weight: 190 lb (86 kg)

Career information
- High school: Bonds-Wilson (North Charleston, South Carolina)
- College: Morgan State (1985–1986); Towson (1987–1988)
- NFL draft: 1989: 5th round, 132nd overall pick

Career history
- New York Giants (1989–1994); New England Patriots (1995–1997); New York Jets (1998)

Awards and highlights
- Super Bowl champion (XXV); 2× Second-team All-Pro (1990, 1996); 2× Pro Bowl (1989, 1996); 2× NFL punt return yards leader (1989, 1990); New England Patriots All-1990s Team; 85th greatest New York Giant of all-time; Walter Payton Award (1988)

Career NFL statistics
- Rushing yards: 1,684
- Rushing average: 4.2
- Rushing touchdowns: 8
- Receptions: 336
- Receiving yards: 3,038
- Receiving touchdowns: 11
- Return yards: 9,274
- Return touchdowns: 8
- Stats at Pro Football Reference

David Lee Meggett (born April 30, 1966) is an American former professional football running back who played in the National Football League (NFL) for 10 seasons. A return specialist for most of his career, he ranks second in NFL punt return yards, which he led at the time of his retirement.

Meggett played college football for the Towson Tigers, winning the Walter Payton Award as a in 1988. He and was selected by the New York Giants in the fifth round of the 1989 NFL draft. Primarily utilized on special teams, he received one Pro Bowl selection during his six seasons with the Giants, in addition to winning Super Bowl XXV. Meggett spent his next three seasons as a member of the New England Patriots, where he was named to a second Pro Bowl, and played for the New York Jets in his final season.

Involved in several legal problems during and after his playing career, Meggett was convicted in 2010 on burglary and criminal sexual conduct charges. He is currently serving a 30-year prison sentence at Lieber Correctional Institution in South Carolina.

== College career ==
Meggett played college football at Division II (1986)/ Division I-AA (1987–88) Towson State University. In his senior season, Meggett led the team in rushing yards (844) and touchdowns (12), while also setting a school record for average yards per kickoff return (32.2) and kickoff return touchdowns (2), earning him the Walter Payton Award. His career average of 25.5 yards per kickoff return (29 returns for 745 yards) was also a school record.

== Professional career ==
Pre-draft measurables
Height	Weight	40-yard dash	10-yard split	20-yard split	20-yard shuttle	Vertical jump	Broad jump	Bench press
5 ft 7 1/4 in (1.71 m)	174 lb (79 kg)	4.64 s	1.69 s	2.76 s	4.26 s	34.5 in (0.88 m)	10 ft 2 in (3.10 m)	20 reps

Meggett was used frequently as both a rusher and a receiver in his NFL career, but was primarily used to return kickoffs and punts on special teams. He led the league in punt return yards (582) in his rookie season, while gaining 577 kickoff return yards, 531 receiving yards, and 117 rushing yards, earning him a trip to the Pro Bowl. Meggett led the NFL in punt return yards again in his second season (467), helping the Giants record a 13–3 regular season record and a 20–19 victory over the Buffalo Bills in Super Bowl XXV. During the 1990 postseason Meggett saw his duties increase when starting running back Rodney Hampton went down with an injury. Splitting time with veteran back Ottis Anderson, he had a solid performance in the Super Bowl, recording 129 all-purpose yards (48 rushing, 18 receiving, 37 punt return, 26 kickoff return).

After four more seasons with New York, Meggett signed with the Patriots in 1995, reuniting with his coach Bill Parcells, who had been his coach with the Giants. In 1996, he had the best season of his career, recording 1,966 all-purpose yards, earning his second trip to the Pro Bowl, and helped New England gain a berth in Super Bowl XXXI. Although his team lost the game 35–21 to the Green Bay Packers, his performance was solid, recording 155 total yards (117 kick return, 30 punt return, eight receiving). Meggett spent one more year with the Patriots before being released due to legal issues. Meggett then join New York Jets in 1998 (once again joining Parcells in a move to new team), but played in just two games during the season. Once again a free agent, Meggett was not resigned by the Jets. Receiving no offers from any other team, Meggett retired at the age of 32, just two years after making the Pro Bowl.

In his ten NFL seasons, Meggett amassed 1,648 rushing yards, 336 receptions for 3,083 yards, 3,708 punt return yards, and 5,566 yards returning kickoffs. In total, Meggett gained 14,005 all-purpose yards and scored 29 touchdowns (eight rushing, 11 receiving, seven punt returns, one kickoff return).. He also completed four of eight passes for 114 yards and four touchdowns..

At the time of his retirement, his 3,709 punt return yards were the most in NFL history; he has since been passed by Brian Mitchell.

Subsequent to his NFL career, Meggett was an assistant coach at American International College for over two years, and then moved to North Carolina.

== NFL career statistics ==
Legend
	Won the Super Bowl
	Led the league
**Bold**	Career high

=== Regular season ===
Year	Team	Games		Rushing					Receiving					Punt returns					Kick returns				
Year	Team	GP	GS	Att	Yds	Avg	Lng	TD	Rec	Yds	Avg	Lng	TD	Ret	Yds	Avg	Lng	TD	Ret	Yds	Avg	Lng	TD
1989	NYG	16	2	28	117	4.2	18	0	34	**531**	**15.6**	**62**	**4**	46	582	**12.7**	**76**	1	27	577	21.4	43	0
1990	NYG	16	1	22	164	**7.5**	**51**	0	39	410	10.5	38	1	43	467	10.9	68	1	21	492	23.4	58	0
1991	NYG	16	2	29	153	5.3	30	1	50	412	8.2	22	3	28	287	10.3	70	1	25	514	20.6	42	0
1992	NYG	16	0	32	167	5.2	30	0	38	229	6.0	24	2	27	240	8.9	39	0	20	455	22.8	**92**	**1**
1993	NYG	16	1	69	**329**	4.8	23	0	38	319	8.4	50	0	32	331	10.3	75	1	24	403	16.8	35	0
1994	NYG	16	**3**	**91**	298	3.3	26	**4**	32	293	9.2	34	0	26	323	12.4	68	**2**	29	548	18.9	30	0
1995	NWE	16	0	60	250	4.2	25	2	**52**	334	6.4	19	0	45	383	8.5	23	0	**38**	**964**	**25.4**	62	0
1996	NWE	16	1	40	122	3.1	12	0	33	292	8.8	26	0	**52**	**588**	11.3	60	1	34	781	23.0	54	0
1997	NWE	16	2	20	60	3.0	10	1	19	203	10.7	49	1	45	467	10.4	47	0	33	816	24.7	61	0
1998	NYJ	2	0	7	24	3.4	18	0	1	15	15.0	15	0	5	40	8.0	18	0	1	16	16.0	16	0
Career		146	12	398	1,684	4.2	51	8	336	3,038	9.0	62	11	349	3,708	10.6	76	7	252	5,566	22.1	92	1

== Personal life and prison sentence ==
David Lee Meggett
- Born: April 30, 1966 (age 60); Charleston, South Carolina
- Status: South Carolina Department of Corrections ID #00343610, incarcerated at Allendale Correctional Institution in Fairfax, South Carolina; earliest possible release July 8, 2034
- Conviction: November 10, 2010
- Criminal charges: Burglary, criminal sexual conduct
- Penalty: 30 years in prison, with 25.5 years minimum

Meggett has nine children from eight different women, including Davin Meggett, who grew up in Clinton, Maryland. He went to Surrattsville High School and played football at Towson University.

Meggett was one of the favorite players of coach Bill Parcells, playing for him on the Giants, Patriots, and Jets. When Parcells coached the Dallas Cowboys, Meggett consulted with the team's punt returners during training camp.

In 1990, Meggett was arrested for soliciting a prostitute, but was acquitted. He was charged with assaulting his then-girlfriend in 1995, but was acquitted because the judge believed that the girlfriend was the aggressor and that Meggett had used "reasonable force" to keep her out of his house.

In 1998, Meggett was arrested in Toronto after authorities alleged that he assaulted an escort worker after a three-way sexual encounter. Following this incident, the Patriots promptly released him per their zero-tolerance policy for violence against women enacted after the fallout from their selection of Christian Peter two years earlier. According to a 2014 report in SB Nation, the public reaction to this incident led other teams to look askance at Meggett's history with women, and was a reason why his number was never called by another NFL team after the Jets opted against re-signing him. A trial on the assault charge ended with a hung jury in April 2000.

In later years, Meggett faced multiple legal and financial difficulties related to his failure to pay child support to his nine children. He'd earned over $10 million during his NFL career, but much of it went toward back-owed child support. Due to financial troubles, he eventually sold his Super Bowl ring on eBay.

Meggett was the parks and recreation director in Robersonville, North Carolina. Most of his salary was diverted to pay child support. He resigned in 2006, after he was accused of sexually assaulting his former girlfriend. In 2007, he was convicted of misdemeanor sexual battery in the case, but only received two years' probation. Authorities said he was allowed to move back to South Carolina to serve his probation. Soon afterward, in 2008, he was accused of sexually assaulting a 17-year-old girl, but prosecutors opted not to pursue the case due to their questions about her credibility.

In January 2009, Meggett was arrested for raping and robbing a part-time student at the College of Charleston. On November 10, 2010, Meggett was convicted of burglary and criminal sexual conduct, and sentenced to 30 years in prison. Under South Carolina sentencing guidelines, he must serve 85 percent of his sentence before being considered for parole—in this case, 25.5 years.

Meggett, South Carolina Department of Corrections ID #00343610, is serving his sentence at Lieber Correctional Institution in Ridgeville, South Carolina. His earliest possible release date is July 6, 2034. At the time he was profiled by SB Nation, Meggett had compiled a nearly spotless disciplinary record and was housed in Lieber's "honors dorm," allowing him to leave his cell unlocked for most of the day and move around the wing and common area. Since then, Meggett has accrued several disciplinary infractions for possessing or attempted possession of a cell phone, leading to detention and loss of privileges.

== See also ==
- History of the New York Giants (1979–93)
- Crime in Sports episode covering Meggett's life, career, and crimes
