= East Clarendon High School =

South Carolina school

Coordinates: 33.8925°N 80.0147°W

East Clarendon Middle-High School

Location
- 1171 Pope Street; Turbeville, South Carolina; United States

Information
- Type: Public Middle-High School
- Established: 1952
- Founder: Frank Elsivan "F. E." DuBose
- Status: Active
- School district: Clarendon County School District 4
- Administrator: Shawn Johnson
- Principal: Laura Fleming
- Teaching staff: 38.00 (FTE)
- Grades: 6–12
- Enrollment: 728 (2023-2024)
- Student to teacher ratio: 19.16
- Campus: Suburban
- Colors: Navy and white
- Athletics: Football, Volleyball, Cross Country, Track, Baseball, Basketball
- Mascot: Wolverine
- Yearbook: The Wolverine (1953-1987); Various Titles (1988-present)

East Clarendon Middle-High School is a combined public school located in the town of Turbeville, South Carolina. It is a branch of the Clarendon County School District Four.

== History ==
Before 1948, there were three schools located on the eastern side of Clarendon County: Gable High School (Gable, South Carolina), Salem High School (New Zion, South Carolina), and Turbeville High School (Turbeville, South Carolina). In 1949, Gable and Salem were consolidated to create Black River High School. Then in 1952, Black River and Turbeville were consolidated to create what is known today as East Clarendon High School. The school made its inaugural start on Thursday, September 11 of that same year at what was the former Turbeville High School building, which was built in 1938.

In the summer of 1970, the South Carolina Department of Education declared mandatory action for the school to integrate with Walker-Gamble High School, then an all-black high school located in New Zion, South Carolina, following the Brown v. Board of Education ruling.

In 1997, a US$5.2 million referendum was passed, allowing then-Clarendon County School District Three to demolish the former building in order to reconstruct a new building for East Clarendon Middle School. The former building was deemed energy-deficient and too expensive to continue maintaining.

The majority of its current establishment was opened on August 14, 2000, the start of its 2000-2001 school year. The media center was completed in January 2001. A new extension was also added to the high school, which was completed the following month.

== Organizations ==
The school has chapters that are affiliates of the following organizations: the National Beta Club, the National FFA Organization and the Science Olympiad.

Their former affiliations include the 4-H, the Future Homemakers of America and the Quill and Scroll.

== Sports ==
The school offers the following sports: Baseball, Basketball, Cross Country, Football, Golf, Softball, Tennis, Track and Volleyball.

The Shad Hall Memorial Stadium hosts two of the school's sports: as a football stadium during the first semester and as a baseball stadium during the second semester. It is posthumously-named after one of the school's former principals and athletic coaches: Herman Eugene "Shad" Hall, who prior to his sudden death in a two-vehicle automobile accident in 1966, led the school's varsity baseball team to three state championship titles (1958, 1959 and 1960) and the school's varsity football team to two Class "B" state championship titles (1961 and 1965).

There has only been one jersey number that the school retired:

Number 10 - Talaysia Cooper (Class of 2022; Girls' Basketball; 2017-2022)

Number 20 - Jimmy Fleming (Class of 1985; Football; 1981-1984)

== Notable alumni ==
- Talaysia Cooper (Class of 2022), basketball player
- Nathaniel Rowland (Class of 2012), murderer of Samantha Josephson
