= Tyger River Correctional Institution =

State prison in South Carolina, United States

Coordinates: 34°42′42″N 81°49′41″W

- Interactive map of Tyger River Correctional Institution
- Location: 200 Prison Road Enoree, South Carolina
- Status: medium
- Capacity: 1160
- Opened: 1980
- Managed by: South Carolina Department of Corrections

Tyger River Correctional Institution is a medium-security state prison for men located in Enoree, Spartanburg County, South Carolina, owned and operated by the South Carolina Department of Corrections.

The facility was opened in 1980 and has a capacity of 1160 inmates held at medium security.

== See also ==
- List of South Carolina state prisons
