= A Taste for Killing =

- Genre: Drama; Thriller
- Written by: Dan Bronson
- Story by: Allen Rucker; Hudson Marquez
- Directed by: Lou Antonio
- Starring: Michael Biehn; Jason Bateman; Henry Thomas; Renée Zellweger
- Music by: Mark Snow
- Country of origin: United States
- Original language: English

Production
- Executive producer: Barry Greenfield
- Producer: Michael S. Murphey
- Production locations: Houston; Galveston, Texas; Pasadena, Texas
- Cinematography: Gayne Rescher
- Editor: Gary Griffin
- Running time: 87 minutes
- Production company: Bodega Bay Productions

Original release
- Network: USA Network
- Release: August 12, 1992

A Taste for Killing is a 1992 American made-for-television thriller drama film directed by Lou Antonio and starring Michael Biehn, Jason Bateman and Henry Thomas. It marked Renée Zellweger's film debut. The film was originally broadcast August 12, 1992 on USA Network.

== Plot ==
Blaine Stockard III (Bateman) and Cary Sloan (Thomas) are best friends from well-to-do families who both set off for adventurous summer jobs on a Texas offshore oil rig between college graduation and law school. Openly resentful of their high society background, the boys' blue-collar bad-tempered boss Elray (Deckert) makes their lives as miserable as possible. Soon the boys meet happy-go-lucky Bo Landry (Biehn), who befriends the naive kids, shows them the ropes and helps them survive. The boys soon discover that their new friend is anything but a lifesaver. Preying on their innocence, Bo soon reveals himself as a con-artist with deadly intentions.

== Cast ==
- Michael Biehn as Bo Landry
- Jason Bateman as Blaine Stockard III
- Henry Thomas as Cary Sloan
- Blue Deckert as Elray Phelps
- Renée Zellweger as Mary Lou
- Brandon Smith as Detective Grier
- Woody Watson as Detective Rutland
- Fred Lerner as Duane
