= Talaysia Cooper =

American basketball player

No. 55 – Ole Miss Rebels
- Position: Guard
- League: Southeastern Conference

Personal information
- Born: July 17, 2004 (age 21) Turbeville, South Carolina, U.S.
- Listed height: 6 ft 0 in (1.83 m)

Career information
- High school: East Clarendon (Turbeville, South Carolina)
- College: South Carolina (2022–2023); Tennessee (2024–2026); Ole Miss (2026-present)

Career highlights
- SEC All-Defensive team (2025); McDonald's All-American (2022)

Talaysia Cooper (born July 17, 2004) is an American college basketball player for the Ole Miss women’s basketball team of the Southeastern Conference (SEC).

== High school career ==
Cooper played for East Clarendon in Turbeville. As a junior, she averaged 23.7 points, 12.8 rebounds, and 8 assists, winning South Carolina Gatorade Player of the Year in 2021. Cooper was a five-star recruit and the number 18 recruit in the class of 2022. In October 2021, Cooper committed to South Carolina. Cooper scored over 3,000 points in high school, and was named a McDonald's All-American.

== College career ==
As a freshman, Cooper played in a reserve role, averaging 2.9 points, 1.8 rebounds, and 1.3 assists. On December 29 2022, she scored a career-high 15 points against Texas A&M. At the end of the season, Cooper announced that she would be transferring. In July 2023, she committed to Tennessee. Because she left after the transfer portal closed, Cooper sat out the 2023–24 season.

In her redshirt sophomore season, she averaged 16.6 points which led the team. Cooper had her first career double-double against Middle Tennessee on November 12 2024, scoring 18 points and 10 rebounds. A few days later, she scored a career-high 33 points against Liberty. She was subsequently named SEC and USBWA Player of the Week for her performance. Cooper led the SEC in total steals, with 88 in the season, and was named to the SEC All-Defensive team.

== Career statistics ==
Legend
GP	Games played	GS	Games started	MPG	Minutes per game	RPG	Rebounds per game
APG	Assists per game	SPG	Steals per game	BPG	Blocks per game	PPG	Points per game
TO	Turnovers per game	FG%	Field-goal percentage	3P%	3-point field-goal percentage	FT%	Free-throw percentage
**Bold**	Career best	°	League leader

=== College ===
Year	Team	GP	GS	MPG	FG%	3P%	FT%	RPG	APG	SPG	BPG	TO	PPG
2022–23	South Carolina	24	0	8.4	38.9	23.8	38.1	1.8	1.3	0.4	0.1	**0.8**	2.9
2023–24	Tennessee	did not play - redshirted											
2024–25	Tennessee	**34**	**27**	**23.5**	**44.7**	**26.7**	**67.1**	**5.6**	**3.2**	**3.1**	**0.7**	3.5	**16.6**
**Career**		71	37	18.6	44.0	28.1	61.7	4.4	2.7	2.2	0.5	2.5	11.6
Statistics retrieved from Sports-Reference.
