= Kershaw Correctional Institution =

Prison in South Carolina, United States

Coordinates: 34°35′45″N 80°32′57″W

- Interactive map of Kershaw Correctional Institution
- Location: 4848 Gold Mine Hwy Kershaw, South Carolina
- Status: open
- Security class: medium
- Capacity: 1403
- Opened: 1997
- Managed by: South Carolina Department of Corrections

Kershaw Correctional Institution is a medium-security state prison for men located in Kershaw, Lancaster County, South Carolina, owned and operated by the South Carolina Department of Corrections.

The facility was opened in 1997 and has a capacity of 1403 inmates held at medium security.

== See also ==
- List of South Carolina state prisons
