= Evans Correctional Institution =

Prison in South Carolina, United States

Coordinates: 34°39′10″N 79°42′51″W

- Interactive map of Evans Correctional Institution
- Location: 610 Highway 9 West Bennettsville, South Carolina
- Status: open
- Security class: medium
- Capacity: 1342
- Opened: 1989
- Managed by: South Carolina Department of Corrections

Evans Correctional Institution is a medium-security state prison for men located in Bennettsville, Marlboro County, South Carolina, owned and operated by the South Carolina Department of Corrections.

The facility was opened in 1989 and named for Josiah J Evans, a former judge and Senator from the Marlboro area. The prison has a capacity of 1342 inmates held at medium security.

== See also ==
- List of South Carolina state prisons
