= Gable, South Carolina =

- Unincorporated community
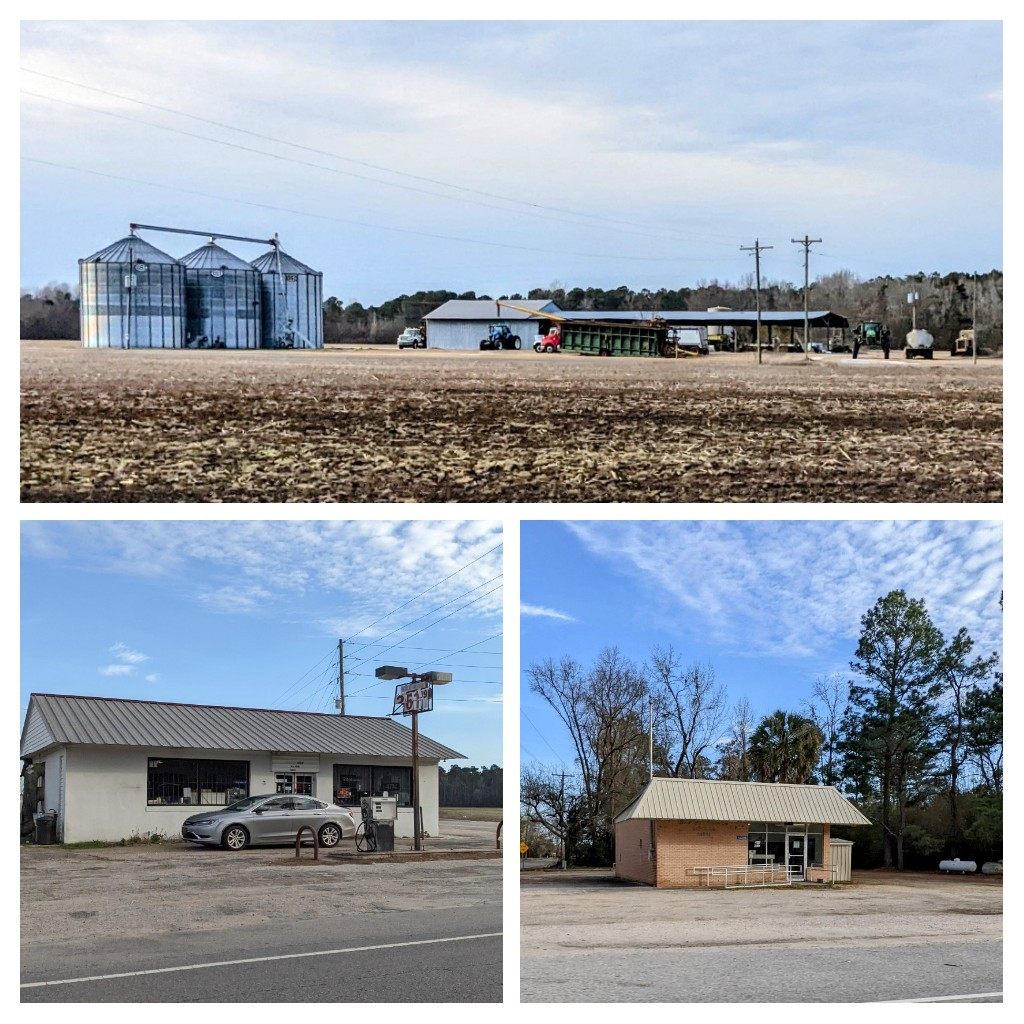

- Location within South Carolina Location within the United States
- Coordinates: 33°49′31″N 80°06′33″W
- Country: United States
- State: South Carolina
- County: Clarendon
- Elevation: 105 ft (32 m)
- Time zone: UTC-5 (Eastern (EST))
  - Summer (DST): UTC-4 (EDT)
- ZIP code: 29051
- Area codes: 803, 839
- GNIS feature ID: 1247853

Gable is an unincorporated community in Clarendon County, South Carolina, United States. The community is located along U.S. Route 301, 10.7 miles (17.2 km) north-northeast of Manning. Gable has a post office with ZIP code 29051, which opened on June 6, 1916.

== Education ==
The community formerly had two all-white public high schools: Gable High School and Black River High School; both of which were located north of the town's post office.

The six-room, single-auditorium brick and stucco Gable High School was built at an estimated $10,000. The school's opening day was originally scheduled for Monday, September 8, 1924, but due to an unforeseen delay in funding, the inaugural start of the 1924-1925 school year was rescheduled to Monday, September 15, 1924. Despite the school permanently closing upon the conclusion of its 1948–1949 school year, the building consolidated with New Zion, South Carolina's Salem High School to create Black River High School.

Black River High School first opened in the autumn of 1949, and its final graduating class concluded its ceremonies on the evening of Friday, May 30, 1952. Their school mascot was the alligator. During the summer of 1952, the defunct school consolidated with Turbeville High School to create East Clarendon High School.

For sports, both of these schools formerly offered baseball, boys' and girls' basketball and football.
