= 2016 Townville Elementary School shooting =

Mass shooting in South Carolina, U.S.

- Location: Townville, South Carolina, U.S.
- Date: September 28, 2016 c. 1:44 – c. 2:00 p.m. EST (UTC-05:00)
- Target: Students and staff at Townville Elementary School
- Attack type: Mass shooting, school shooting, pedicide, patricide
- Weapon: Springfield Armory XD .40-caliber semi-automatic pistol
- Deaths: 2 (including the perpetrator's father at home)
- Injuries: 3
- Perpetrator: Jesse Osborne
- Charges: Life in prison without the possibility of parole for both murders, plus 30 years for attempted murder, later commuted to 75 years' imprisonment

The Townville Elementary School shooting occurred on September 28, 2016, in Townville, South Carolina, located 40 miles (64 km) southwest of Greenville. Fourteen-year-old Jesse Osborne shot three students and a teacher, critically wounding six-year-old student Jacob Hall, who died from his injuries three days later. Osborne, who had also shot and killed his father before the shooting, was arrested as the sole suspect and charged with murder and attempted murder.

== Shooting ==
The shooting started before 1:45 p.m., when Osborne drove into a fence of Townville Elementary School in a black pickup truck, got out of the vehicle and began firing into the air near the school's playground with a .40-caliber pistol, repeatedly shouting, "I hate my life." He then jumped the fence and began firing at students. Police received a 9-1-1 call on the shooting at 1:44 p.m. At around 2:00 p.m., Osborne was apprehended by a volunteer firefighter after his gun jammed on the playground, just 12 seconds after he first pulled the trigger. During his interview with police Osborne stated he threw his gun and his vest away after realizing he was "going to hell" and called his paternal grandparents in tears to confess what he had done. A body, later identified as the suspect's father, was later discovered at the family home by Osborne's grandmother. The "unintelligible" call from her grandson prompted her to go to the home to investigate.

One student was shot in the foot and a female teacher was shot in the shoulder; both were treated at AnMed Health and released the following evening. Another student suffered a superficial wound that did not require medical treatment. A third student, six-year-old Jacob Hall, suffered a gunshot wound to the leg, which led to massive blood loss and then cardiac arrest. He was airlifted to Greenville Memorial Hospital and underwent surgery. Hall died on October 1, three days after having been shot. A superhero-themed funeral for Hall was held on October 5.

== Perpetrator ==
Jesse Dewitt Osborne (born September 8, 2002) was identified as the gunman. He had attended Townville Elementary School through fifth grade and was known to be sociable and someone who did well in classes. At the time of the shooting, he was being homeschooled after being expelled from middle school for bringing in a hatchet and a machete earlier in the year of the shooting. He had a presence online, and made a comment saying: "I think I'll most likely kill around 50 or 60.", and he enjoyed studying serial killers and mass killers, including the perpetrator of the Sandy Hook Elementary School shooting. On February 16, 2018, Judge Edgar H Long made the decision to waive Osborne, 15 years old at the time, out of Family Court and up to General Sessions Court where he will be tried as an adult. Osborne was charged with two counts of murder, three counts of attempted murder and five counts of possessing a weapon. By U.S. federal statues, Osborne faced up to life in prison without parole.

== Legal proceedings ==
On September 7, 2018, Osborne pled not guilty on all counts before a South Carolina Supreme Court Judge. His attorney, however, publicly hinted at the possibility of a plea deal. Several witnesses were called forward over the following two months, including an investigator who testified that Osborne had been influenced by an online chat-group of people "obsessed" with mass shootings, some of whom encouraged Osborne to commit one himself. Prior testimony from the investigator revealed that Osborne had been planning an attack for months through his internet searches, constituting premeditation.

But on December 12 of that year, Osborne pleaded guilty to the five counts of murder and attempted murder, waiving his right to a jury trial. His attorney stated that it was in his client's best interest that he pled guilty rather than go through a trial. Sentencing was postponed to a later date to allow Judge R. Lawton McIntosh to appropriately decide Osborne's fate, given that he was set to serve a minimum of thirty years and a maximum of life without parole. Jacob Hall's father was in the court gallery during Osborne's guilty plea, as was Osborne's aunt. Jacob's mother did not attend the hearing, as she was incarcerated following her drug arrest less than a month before the plea.

Osborne was tried as an adult, and on November 13, 2019, he was sentenced to life in prison without parole for the murder of Jacob Hall and his father, plus 30 years for the attempted murder charges. Osborne appealed his sentence and in September 2023, his two life sentences were changed to two 75-year sentences, to be served concurrently. He will be released when he is 89 years old.

Osborne was incarcerated in the Kirkland Correctional Institution until January 2020, when he was transferred to the Turbeville Correctional Institution and in September he was transferred to the Lieber Correctional Institution then in January 2024 he was transferred back to the Kirkland Correctional Institution.

== See also ==
- List of school-related attacks
- List of school shootings in the United States
