= Kirkland Correctional Institution =

Prison in Columbia, South Carolina

- Interactive map of Kirkland Correctional Institution
- Location: 4344 Broad River Road Columbia, South Carolina; 34°04′10″N 81°05′55″W
- Status: open
- Security class: mixed, including maximum
- Capacity: 1781
- Opened: 1975
- Managed by: South Carolina Department of Corrections

Kirkland Correctional Institution is a state prison for men located in Columbia, Richland County, South Carolina, United States, owned and operated by the South Carolina Department of Corrections.

Kirkland has a special role in South Carolina's prison system as the point of intake and assessment for all male state prisoners, the site of the state's Maximum Security Unit, and a health care facility. The prison was first opened in 1975, and houses a maximum of 1707 inmates, plus another 50 in the Max unit and 24 in the infirmary. In September 2017, death row inmates were moved to Kirkland Correctional Institution.

The state's Broad River Correctional Institution is adjacent to the north.

== Notable Inmates ==
Current

Inmate Name	Register Number	Status	Details
Frederick Hopkins Jr.	00392232 / SC00365146	Serving two life sentences without parole.	Perpetrator of the 2018 Florence, South Carolina shooting in which he murdered two police officers after they were called to his home.
Jesse Dewitt Osborne	00382777 / SC02381155	Serving two life sentences, later changed to two 75-year sentences. Scheduled for release in 2094.	Perpetrator of the 2016 Townville Elementary School shooting in which he murdered his father, before driving to the previously mentioned school, and murdered student Jacob Hall.
Alex Murdaugh	00390394 / SC00565210	Serving two life sentences without parole.	Perpetrator of the 2021 murder of his wife, Maggie, and their 22-year-old son, Paul.

Former

- Richard Valenti, a serial killer who killed three teenage girls between 1973 and 1974. He was sentenced to life imprisonment and died in 2020 of natural causes.

== See also ==
- List of South Carolina state prisons
