= Henry Thomas =

American actor (born 1971)

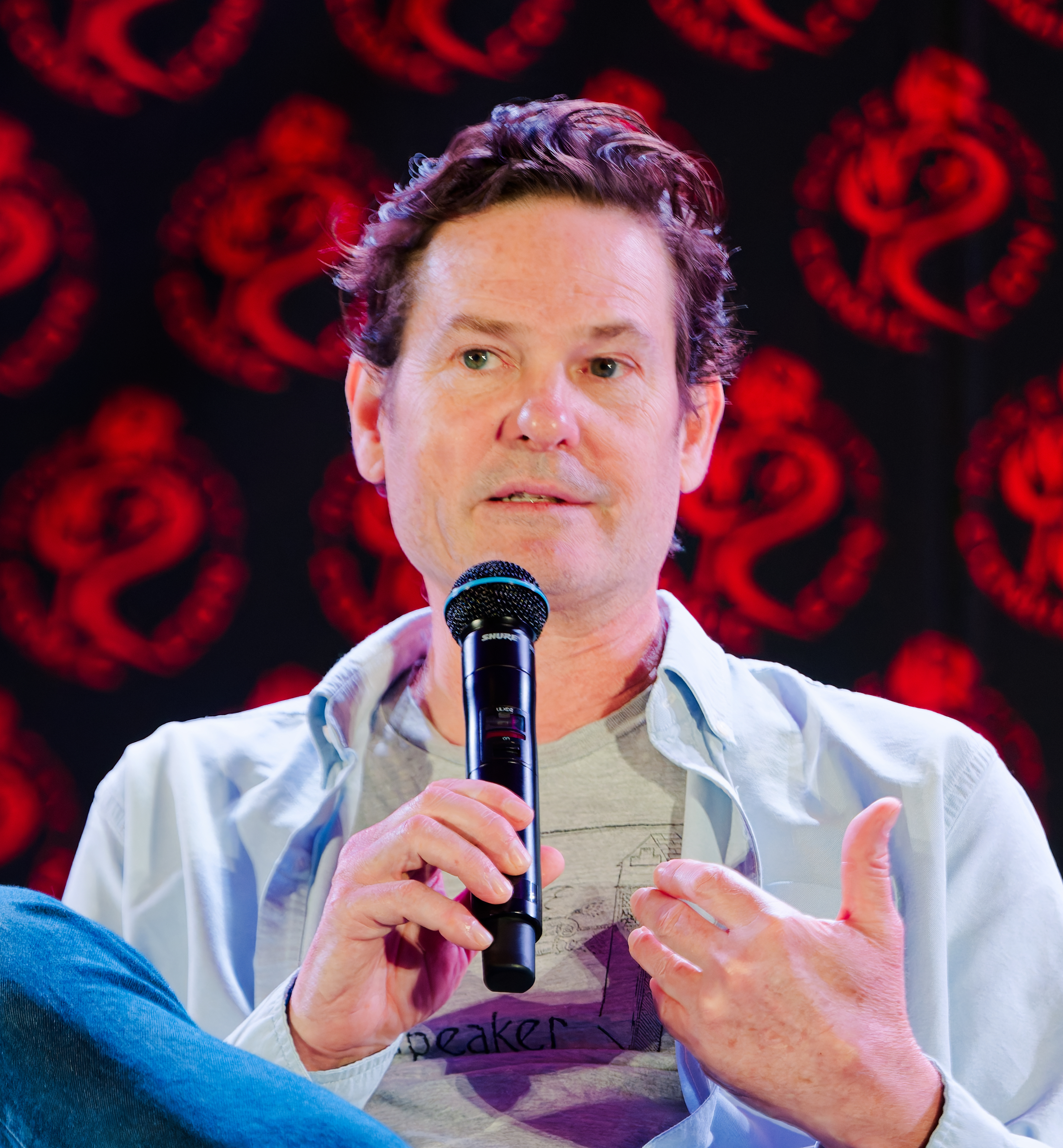
- Thomas at Rose City Comic Con in 2025
- Born: Henry Jackson Thomas; September 9, 1971 (age 55); San Antonio, Texas, U.S.
- Occupation: Actor
- Years active: 1981–present
- Spouses: Kelley Hill (m. 2000; div. 2002) Marie Zielcke (m. 2004; div. 2007) Annalee Fery (m. 2009, separated)
- Partner: India Eisley (2025-present)
- Children: 3

Henry Jackson Thomas (born September 9, 1971) is an American actor. He began his career as a child actor and had the lead role of Elliott Taylor in the film E.T. the Extra-Terrestrial (1982), for which he won a Young Artist Award and received Golden Globe Award, BAFTA Award, and Saturn Award nominations. Thomas also had roles in other films, including Cloak & Dagger (1984), Frog Dreaming (1986), Valmont (1989), Fire in the Sky (1993), Legends of the Fall (1994), Suicide Kings (1997), All the Pretty Horses (2000), Gangs of New York (2002), 11:14 (2003), and Dear John (2010). Thomas was nominated for the Golden Globe Award for Best Supporting Actor – Series, Miniseries or Television Film for his role in the television film Indictment: The McMartin Trial (1997).

More recently, Thomas collaborated with filmmaker Mike Flanagan, appearing in the films Ouija: Origin of Evil (2016), Gerald's Game (2017) and Doctor Sleep (2019) as well as the television series The Haunting of Hill House (2018) (which earned him a Saturn Award) and its follow-up series The Haunting of Bly Manor (2020). In 2021, he had a main role in Flanagan's horror series Midnight Mass, and, in 2023, he starred as one of the Usher siblings in The Fall of the House of Usher (2023), also by Flanagan.

== Early life ==
Thomas was born in San Antonio, Texas. He attended East Central High School before entering Blinn College; he left without a degree.

== Career ==
=== Acting ===
Thomas's first role was in the Sissy Spacek drama Raggedy Man in 1981 at the age of eight. That film's director Jack Fisk suggested Thomas for the lead role in E.T. the Extra-Terrestrial. Hundreds of boys auditioned, but Thomas' audition in front of director Steven Spielberg was so convincing that as he finished, Spielberg said "OK kid, you got the job." Casting director Marci Liroff said, "In about 3 seconds flat he had us all crying behind the camera ...it was one of the most amazing and moving audition experiences I had really ever been through."

The film made Thomas and his co-star Drew Barrymore instant stars. Made for a budget of $10.5 million, E.T. made $797.3 million at the box office, becoming at the time the highest grossing film ever. However, Thomas revealed in 2012 that he made minimum wage at the time, under $10,000. He also said the film made it nearly impossible for him to live normally for some time, stating, "I was a shy kid, and being approached by adults all the time just freaked me out." He returned to San Antonio to focus on school, but appeared in 1984's Cloak & Dagger and 1989's Valmont.

Thomas struggled with the popularity he gained in the months following the 1982 release of E.T. In November 2019, Thomas reprised his role as Elliott for an Xfinity & Sky UK commercial, in which E.T. returns to visit a now-adult Elliott and his family for the holidays.

Since 2016, Thomas has worked frequently with filmmaker Mike Flanagan, appearing in his films Ouija: Origin of Evil, Gerald's Game and Doctor Sleep, as well as in the Netflix horror series The Haunting of Hill House, which Flanagan created and directed. Thomas also has a role in Flanagan's follow up to The Haunting of Hill House, The Haunting of Bly Manor, and Flanagan's mini-series Midnight Mass.

Thomas worked in Stargirl portraying Doctor Mid-Nite and voicing his A.I. counterpart "Chuck" until the latter role was recast with Alex Collins in season two.

=== Music ===
Thomas wrote songs and played guitar for a San Antonio band, The Blue Heelers (named for the breed of dog), in the 1990s. Although the band was not signed to a record label, it self-produced an album, Twister. Thomas continued to write and record songs. In 1998, his song "Truckstop Coffee" (recorded with the Blue Heelers) appeared on V2's soundtrack for Niagara, Niagara. In 2003, Thomas and Nikki Sudden collaborated on the music for Mika Kaurismäki's film Honey Baby, which featured four original songs written and performed by Thomas as the fictional musician Tom Brackett. An album was in the works, but Sudden died unexpectedly in 2006.

== Personal life ==
Thomas married actress Marie Zielcke on May 10, 2004. They had a daughter. The couple were divorced in 2007. Thomas also has two children with his third wife Annalee Fery, and in 2014 moved to Wilsonville, Oregon. Thomas and Fery separated during an unspecified point in time. In 2025, he was reported to be dating actress India Eisley.

== Filmography ==
=== Film ===
Year	Title	Role	Notes
1981	Raggedy Man	Harry	
1982	E.T. the Extra-Terrestrial	Elliott Taylor	
1984	Misunderstood	Andrew Rawley	
1984	Cloak & Dagger	Davey Osborne	
1985	Frog Dreaming	Cody Walpole	
1988	Murder One	Billy Isaacs	
1989	Valmont	Raphael Danceny	
1993	Fire in the Sky	Greg Hayes	
1994	Curse of the Starving Class	Wesley Tate	
1994	Legends of the Fall	Samuel Ludlow	
1997	Niagara, Niagara	Seth	
1997	Suicide Kings	Avery Chasten	
1997	Bombshell	Buck Hogan	
1999	Fever	Nick Parker	
2000	The House That Screamed	Jack Gillton	Direct-to-video
2000	A Good Baby	Raymond Toker	
2000	All the Pretty Horses	Lacey Rawlins	
2001	The Quickie	Alex	
2002	Dead in the Water	Jeff	
2002	I'm with Lucy	Barry	
2002	Gangs of New York	Johnny Sirocco	
2003	I Capture the Castle	Simon Cotton	
2003	11:14	Jack Levine	
2003	Honey Baby	Tom Brackett	
2003	Briar Patch	Edgar MacBeth	
2004	Dead Birds	William	
2006	The Hard Easy	Paul Weston	
2007	The Last Sin Eater	Man of God	
2007	Suffering Man's Charity	Eric Rykell	
2008	Red Velvet	Aaron	
2009	Don't Look Up	Josh Petri	
2010	Dear John	Tim Wheddon	
2011	The Last Ride	Hank Williams Sr.	
2013	Big Sur	Philip Whalen	
2016	Ouija: Origin of Evil	Father Tom Hogan	
2017	Gerald's Game	Tom Burlingame	
2019	The Great Alaskan Race	Thompson	
2019	Doctor Sleep	The Bartender / Jack Torrance	
2019	A Holiday Reunion	Elliott Taylor	Short film
2021	To All the Boys: Always and Forever	Mr. Kavinski	
2022	Sam & Kate	Ron	
2022	Crawlspace	Robert Mitchell	
2023	Pet Sematary: Bloodlines	Dan Crandall	
2024	The Curse of the Necklace	Frank Davis	
2025	Due West	Pastor Mike	Also co-producer
TBA	Pawn Shop		

=== Television ===
Year	Title	Role	Notes
1990	Psycho IV: The Beginning	Young Norman Bates	Television film
1992	A Taste for Killing	Cary Sloan	Television film
1995	Indictment: The McMartin Trial	Ray Buckey	Television film
1996	Riders of the Purple Sage	Bern Venters	Television film
1998	Moby Dick	Ishmael	Miniseries
1999	Happy Face Murders	Dylan McCarthy	Television film
2005	Masters of Horror	Jamie	Episode: "Chocolate"
2006	Stephen King's Desperation	Peter Jackson	Television film
2006	Nightmares & Dreamscapes: From the Stories of Stephen King	Robert Fornoy	Episode: "The End of the Whole Mess"
2007–08	Without a Trace	Franklin Romar	2 episodes
2009	CSI: Crime Scene Investigation	Jeremy Kent	Episode: "If I Had a Hammer"
2011	The Mentalist	Thomas Lisbon	Episode: "Where in the World is Carmine O'Brien?"
2013–14	Betrayal	T.J. Karsten	13 episodes
2015	Sons of Liberty	John Adams	Miniseries
2016	Law & Order: Special Victims Unit	Sean Roberts	Episode: "Making a Rapist"
2017	Better Things	Robin	4 episodes
2018	The Haunting of Hill House	Young Hugh Crain	Series regular
2018	Girl in the Bunker	Vinson Filyaw	Television film
2020	FBI: Most Wanted	Dr. Justin Brock	Episode: "Dopesick"
2020	Stargirl	Charles McNider / Doctor Mid-Nite, Voice of Chuck	Recurring role
2020	The Haunting of Bly Manor	Henry Wingrave	Series regular
2021	Midnight Mass	Ed Flynn	Series regular
2021	Just Beyond	Crazy Chris	Episode: "Parents are from Mars, Kids are from Venus"
2022	The Midnight Club	Freedom Jack	Episode: "Road to Nowhere"
2023	The Fall of the House of Usher	Frederick Usher	Series regular

== Awards and nominations ==
Awards and nominations for acting
Year	Award	Category	Nominated work	Result	Reference(s)
1981	3rd Youth in Film Awards	Best Young Motion Picture Actor	Raggedy Man	Nominated	
1982	4th Youth in Film Awards	Best Young Motion Picture Actor	E.T. the Extra-Terrestrial	Won	
1983	40th Golden Globe Awards	New Star of the Year in a Motion Picture – Male	E.T. the Extra-Terrestrial	Nominated	
1983	36th British Academy Film Awards	Most Outstanding Newcomer to Leading Film Roles	E.T. the Extra-Terrestrial	Nominated	
1983	10th Saturn Awards	Best Actor	E.T. the Extra-Terrestrial	Nominated	
1984	6th Youth in Film Awards	Best Young Actor in a Motion Picture: Musical, Comedy, Adventure or Drama	Cloak & Dagger	Nominated	
1996	53rd Golden Globe Awards	Best Supporting Actor in a Series, Miniseries or Television Film	Indictment: The McMartin Trial	Nominated	
2006	6th DVD Exclusive Awards	Best Actor in a DVD Premiere Movie	11:14	Nominated	
2019	45th Saturn Awards	Best Actor in Streaming Presentation	The Haunting of Hill House	Won	
2025	52nd Saturn Awards	Best Supporting Actor in a Television Series	The Fall of the House of Usher	Nominated	

=== Other honors ===
- VH1's "100 Greatest Kid Stars"
- 2005, ranked #4, E!'s "50 Cutest Child Stars All Grown-up"
- 2013, inducted into the Texas Film Hall of Fame

== Bibliography ==
- Holmstrom, John. The Moving Picture Boy: An International Encyclopaedia from 1895 to 1995, Norwich, Michael Russell, 1996, pp. 387–388.
