= Turbeville Correctional Institution =

Prison in South Carolina, United States

Coordinates: 33°53′11″N 80°04′56″W

- Interactive map of Turbeville Correctional Institution
- Location: 1578 Clarence Coker Hwy Turbeville, South Carolina
- Status: open
- Security class: medium
- Capacity: 1472
- Opened: 1994
- Managed by: South Carolina Department of Corrections

Turbeville Correctional Institution is a medium-security state prison for men located in Turbeville, Clarendon County, South Carolina, owned and operated by the South Carolina Department of Corrections.

The facility was opened in 1994 and has a capacity of 1472 inmates held at medium security: 928 Youthful Offender (ages 17–25) beds and 544 beds for adult population.

== See also ==
- List of South Carolina state prisons
