= Arthur P. Hayne =

United States Army officer & politician (1788–1867)

Arthur Peronneau Hayne
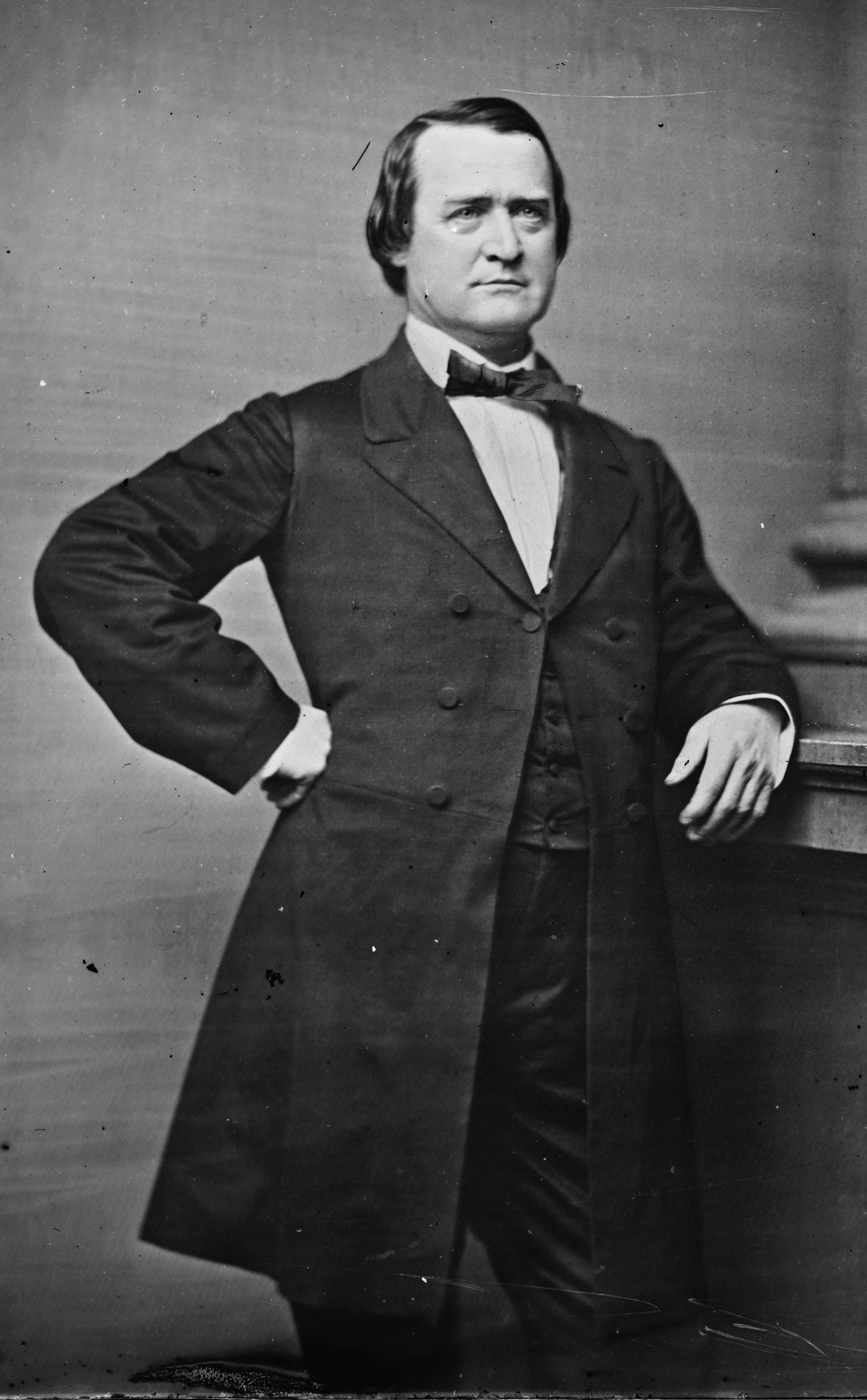

United States Senator from South Carolina
- In office May 11, 1858 – December 2, 1858
- Appointed by: Robert Francis Withers Allston
- Preceded by: Josiah J. Evans
- Succeeded by: James Chesnut, Jr.

Member of the South Carolina House of Representatives from St. Philip's and St. Michael's Parish
- In office November 21, 1828 – December 18, 1829

Personal details
- Born: March 12, 1788 Charleston, South Carolina, U.S.
- Died: January 7, 1867 (aged 78) Charleston, South Carolina, U.S.
- Party: Democratic
- Profession: Politician, Lawyer

Military service
- Years of service: 1812 – 1820
- Rank: Major; Lieutenant Colonel (brevet)
- Battles/wars: War of 1812; Battle of New Orleans; Seminole Wars

Arthur Peronneau Hayne (March 12, 1788 – January 7, 1867) was a United States senator from South Carolina who belonged to the Democratic Party.

== Biography ==
Born in Charleston, March 12, 1788; Hayne was the son of William Hayne, a lowland planter, and his wife Elizabeth Peronneau. Hayne was of English and French Huguenot descent. He pursued classical studies, engaged in business, and served in the War of 1812 as a first lieutenant at Sackets Harbor on Lake Ontario, major of cavalry on the St. Lawrence, and inspector general in 1814. He was brevetted lieutenant colonel for gallant conduct at New Orleans. He studied law with Hon. Thomas Duncan (who would later become his father-in-law) in Carlisle, Pennsylvania, was admitted to the bar and practiced, and served in the Florida War as commander of the Tennessee Volunteers and retired from the military in 1820. Hayne was a member of the South Carolina House of Representatives and was United States naval agent in the Mediterranean for five years. He declined the Belgian mission as ambassador, and was appointed to the United States Senate to fill the vacancy caused by the death of Josiah J. Evans and served from May 11, 1858, to December 2, 1858; he was not a candidate to fill the vacancy. Hayne died in Charleston in 1867; interment was in St. Michael's Churchyard, Charleston.

== Military career ==
Arthur Hayne began his military career in 1807, when in the expansion of the army that occurred in the aftermath of the Chesapeake–Leopard affair, he secured a commission as first lieutenant in the regiment of light dragoons, commanded by Colonel Wade Hampton.

During the War of 1812, Payne fought in the battle of Sacket's Harbor, and was brevetted major for gallantry in action. He later accompanied General Wilkinson down the St. Lawrence in the contemplated attack on Montreal and also served with General Brown.

In 1814 he became Inspector General, with orders to join General Andrew Jackson in the Creek nation. In the absence of Colonel Butler, he also acted as adjutant general. Jackson sent him to Fort Montgomery to organize forces for an attack upon Pensacola. In the storming of the city, Colonel Hayne was one of the first to take possession of an enemy battery under heavy fire. After its fall, he was placed in charge of the city.

In the Battle of New Orleans, Hayne selected the site for Jackson's defense and had much to do with repulsing the British and saving the city, as did Major Wade Hampton of Columbia. After the battle, Jackson sent Hayne to Washington to secure additional troops for the continued defense of the city, not realizing the war had ended. During the war, he was thrice brevetted for bravery.

== Family ==
Arthur Hayne was the older brother of Robert Young Hayne, also a U.S. Senator and Governor of South Carolina; famous for the Webster-Hayne Debate over states' rights and held over several days in the U.S. Senate in 1830. He was a cousin of Isaac Hayne, hanged by the British during the Revolution, and uncle of the poet and editor Paul Hamilton Hayne.

Hayne married Frances Gibson Duncan, daughter of Hon. Thomas Duncan of Carlisle, Pennsylvania, Justice of the Pennsylvania Supreme Court (1817–1827) and Frances Gibson, aunt of John Bannister Gibson, Chief Justice of the Pennsylvania Supreme Court for 24 years. France Duncan Hayne was first cousin of the planter and banker Stephen Duncan. Hayne married second, Elizabeth Laura Alston, daughter of William Alston of Charleston, South Carolina. His only surviving child Frances Duncan Hayne married Lloyd James Beall, a former United States Army officer from Maryland who sided with the Confederate States of America and served as Commandant of the Confederate States Marine Corps.

U.S. Senate
Preceded by Josiah J. Evans	U.S. senator (Class 2) from South Carolina; May 11, 1858 – December 2, 1858; Served alongside: James H. Hammond	Succeeded by James Chesnut, Jr.
