= Camille Griffin Graham Correctional Institution =

State prison for women in Columbia, South Carolina

Coordinates: 34°4′10″N 81°5′54″W

- Interactive map of Camille Griffin Graham Correctional Institution
- Location: 4450 Broad River Road Columbia, South Carolina
- Status: open
- Opened: 1973
- Managed by: South Carolina Department of Corrections

Camille Griffin Graham Correctional Institution is a South Carolina Department of Corrections (SCDC) state prison for women in Columbia, South Carolina. The Women's Reception and Evaluation Center, which processes all females entering SCDC, is in the prison.

The prison opened in 1973, as "Women's Correctional Institution". It was renamed in 2002 in honor of the first female warden of a maximum-security male prison in South Carolina, Camille Griffin Graham.

In October 2019, health care staff at the prison reported that women who reported mental health symptoms were punished with nutraloaf and were denied hygiene items. The warden, Marian Boulware, resigned in January 2020 after the reports. The prison houses the State of South Carolina death row for women.

In January 2011, a young female prisoner with a history of mental illness succeeded in committing suicide. The death is under investigation. In February 2019, another prisoner killed herself. In 2012, an inmate went into labor and was not aided by staff. One of her twins was delivered into a toilet where he died. The state reached a settlement for over a million dollars seven years later.

The prison is one of 40, and the only prison in South Carolina, participating in Girl Scouts of the USA Beyond Bars program, allowing Girl Scouts visitation/bonding with their incarcerated mothers.

== See also ==
- List of South Carolina state prisons
