= Allendale Correctional Institution =

Prison in South Carolina, United States

Coordinates: 32°58′06″N 81°16′09″W

- Interactive map of Allendale Correctional Institution
- Location: 1057 Revolutionary Trail Fairfax, South Carolina
- Status: Open
- Security class: Medium
- Capacity: 1090
- Opened: 1989
- Managed by: South Carolina Department of Corrections

Allendale Correctional Institution is a medium-security state prison for men located near Fairfax in Allendale County, South Carolina, United States, owned and operated by the South Carolina Department of Corrections.

The facility was opened in 1989 and has a capacity of 1090 inmates held at medium security.

== See also ==
- List of South Carolina state prisons
