= Ridgeland Correctional Institution =

Prison in South Carolina, United States

Coordinates: 32°29′41″N 80°58′04″W

- Interactive map of Ridgeland Correctional Institution
- Location: 5 Correctional Road Ridgeland, South Carolina
- Status: open
- Security class: medium
- Capacity: 1165
- Opened: 1995
- Managed by: South Carolina Department of Corrections

Ridgeland Correctional Institution is a state prison for men located in Ridgeland, Jasper County, South Carolina, owned and operated by the South Carolina Department of Corrections.

The facility was opened in 1995, and houses 1165 inmates at medium security.

== See also ==
- List of South Carolina state prisons
