= Lee Correctional Prison Riot =

Prison riot in South Carolina, United States

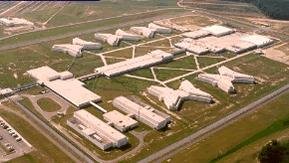
- Lee Correctional Institution
- Date: April 15, 2018
- Location: Bishopville, South Carolina, U.S.; 34°11′51″N 80°13′34″W
- Deaths: Seven prisoners stabbed to death
- Injuries: 22 prisoners taken to the hospital

A prison riot at Lee Correctional Institution in Bishopville, South Carolina, United States occurred on April 15, 2018. Starting as a prison cell robbery, violence between prison gangs intensified into a full-blown riot leading to the death of seven prisoners. It was the most violent prison riot in the United States within the last 25 years. On December 3, 2020, 29 Lee Correctional Institution inmates were indicted on murder and mayhem charges by the State of South Carolina.

Investigators found that the riot was caused by gang activity, shortage of staff, overcrowding, and poor living conditions. In 2021, the South Carolina General Assembly approved a $92 million investment into improving South Carolina's prisons, largely as a result of the Lee Correctional Prison Riot. It will be the largest single-year investment in South Carolina's prisons in history.

== Background ==
Lee Correctional is the largest prison for males in the state of South Carolina. It was built in the 1990s as a high-security prison. The campus is split into two yards, the East and the West. The East Yard is considered less problematic and includes the character-based dorm where prisoners have fewer restrictions. The West Yard consists of the F-1, F-3, and F-5 housing units and is generally seen as the more dangerous of the two yards.

The prison has had issues with three prison gangs: the Bloods, the Gangster Disciples, and the Crips. The Bloods make-up the largest share of the prison population which led to the Gangster Disciples and the Crips occasionally working together. The riot started in the F-3 housing unit and spread from there.

== The riot and aftermath ==
Investigators found that the riot was caused by gang activity, shortage of staff, overcrowding, and poor living conditions.

The riot began after prisoner Michael Milledge was fatally stabbed during a prison cell robbery in the F-3 housing unit near the unit's common area called "the Rock." The assailant, Damonte Rivera, was a member of the Disciples. Rivera was confronted by a member of the Bloods and was fatally stabbed in the neck. This event led to armed prisoners rushing to the Rock while other prisoners fled to their cells. Violence spread from the F-3 Unit and to other prison wings. Some prisoners affiliated with the Gangster Disciples and the Crips sought Raymond Scott, a high-ranking Blood staying in the F-5 unit. Scott and inmate Joshua Jenkins were murdered as they attempted to flee from knife-wielding inmates near the prison's gate. After the killing of Scott, violence spread to the F-1 housing unit, the closest unit to the prison's administrative building. Members of the Crips living in F-1 were targeted in retribution for the murder of Scott.

This disturbance was the most violent riot in the United States within nearly the last 25 years. In its aftermath, prison officials sent 48 prisoners to a private prison in Mississippi. On December 3, 2020, indictments were announced by South Carolina Attorney General Alan Wilson and South Carolina Department of Corrections Director Bryan Stirling containing charges of conspiracy, murder, assault and battery by mob, and prisoners carrying a weapon, according to the indictments.

On September 24, 2026, inmate Larry White was found guilty in the killing of three inmates during the riot, Joshua Jenkins, Raymond Scott and Corey Scott. He was sentenced to three life sentences without the possibility of parole for each slaying.
