= 2018 Florence, South Carolina, shooting =

Shootout in South Carolina, U.S.

- Location: 34.2212°N 79.8475°W; 932 Ashton Dr; Florence County, South Carolina, U.S.
- Date: October 3, 2018; 4:30 pm (GMT)
- Attack type: Mass shooting, double-murder
- Weapon: M14 rifle
- Deaths: 2
- Injuries: 10
- Perpetrator: Fred Hopkins
- Verdict: Guilty
- Convictions: Murder (2 counts); Attempted murder (5 counts)

On October 3, 2018, a mass shooting occurred near Florence, South Carolina, United States, when 74-year-old Fred Hopkins ambushed law enforcement officers as they attempted to serve a search warrant on his adopted son on charges of sexual abuse against a child at Hopkins' home.

Two Florence Police Department officers were killed in the ambush, and three other officers were wounded. Additionally, five civilians were injured during the attack and subsequent shootout, one of whom was shot inside Hopkins' home. On October 12, 2023, Hopkins pleaded guilty to two counts of murder and five counts of attempted murder, and was sentenced to two life sentences plus an additional 150 years. Hopkins died in prison in April 2026.

== Incident ==
On October 3, 2018, police officers arrived at the home of Fredrick Hopkins to serve a search warrant for his adopted son, Seth Hopkins, who was wanted on charges of sexual assault. At the time officers arrived, five people were inside the house, Hopkins, his son Seth, another adult, and two children. At about 4:30 pm EDT [8:30 pm GMT], Hopkins opened fire at officers. According to the Richland County Sheriff, the officers were ambushed by the suspect; when three officers exited their vehicle to walk to the house, they were shot at without warning. Florence County Emergency Management officials said reports of "shots fired and officer down" were issued and responded to at 4:37 EDT, and that the suspect had barricaded himself inside the home with an unspecified number of children. Owing to the number of rounds being fired at officers, it took officers about 30 minutes to get an armored vehicle close enough to evacuate the wounded officers.

=== Victims ===
Two female Florence County deputies and three city of Florence police officers were wounded, with an armored vehicle utilized as a method to rescue downed officers during the shoot-out. An individual inside the home was also shot according to local reporters, with four other civilians reported as being injured. The slain officers were identified as Terrence Carraway, 52-years-old and a 30-year veteran of the Florence Police Department, and Farrah Turner, 36-years-old and a 12-year veteran of the Florence County Sheriff's Office.

== Convicted ==
=== Fred Hopkins ===
The suspect, 74-year-old Fred Hopkins, a former lawyer who was disbarred in 1982, was arrested at the scene before being taken to the hospital for a head injury. On October 5, police charged Hopkins with one count of murder and six counts of attempted murder. A magistrate denied bond for Fred Hopkins on the murder count and the attempted murder charges so that a global bond could be applied to all charges on a later date. On October 12, 2023, Hopkins pleaded guilty to two counts of murder and five counts of attempted murder and was sentenced to two life sentences plus 150 years in prison. He died in prison on April 18, 2026.

=== Seth Hopkins ===
Seth Hopkins, Fred Hopkins' adopted son, who was subject to the initial search warrant before the incident, was charged with criminal sexual conduct with a minor between the ages of 11 and 14. The warrant, released on October 11, detailed that Seth Hopkins had engaged in sexual intercourse, activity/fondling and made inappropriate comments towards a female child on several occasions between September 2017 and October 2018. Hopkins later pled guilty to one count of criminal sexual conduct in the second degree, was sentenced to 20 years in prison, and is currently imprisoned in the Ridgeland Correctional Institution.

== Aftermath ==
=== Investigation ===
The Richland County Sheriff's Office of Columbia, SC, took over the investigation on October 4, and 25 agents from the FBI Evidence Response Team arrived on scene to assist deputies on October 5. The Richland County sheriff, Leon Lott, told reporters that the incident would have occurred regardless of the arresting officers' actions, stating: "The officers did absolutely nothing wrong. This was an ambush you can't prevent." On October 16, Lott said that over 126 guns were seized from the home.

=== Memorials ===
Two official crowdfunding campaigns for the wounded, endorsed by the South Carolina Law Enforcement Officers Association, were launched, as well as separate campaigns through the City of Florence Police Benevolent Fund and the City of Florence website. Neighborhoods utilized blue light bulbs and flags to honor the deceased and injured victims, and food deliveries were sent to the families of officers who were hospitalized. A former officer created a "thin blue line" American flag that was signed by different police departments across the country, then presented to the family of Carraway.

A previously scheduled athletics event on November 9, 2018, at Darlington Raceway was dedicated to the Carraway family. In 2019, the race was officially named the Terrence Carraway 5k. After taking a year off, the race became part of 2021 Cook Out Southern 500 weekend as a Thursday night event. For 2025, the race moved to Saturday late afternoon after conclusion of the NASCAR support race. A record 501 runners, including Front Row Motorsports drivers Zane Smith. and Todd Gilliland, and MRN commentator Steve Post, participated in the 2025 benefit.
