= Love, Lies and Murder =

- Genre: Drama
- Written by: Danielle Hill
- Directed by: Robert Markowitz
- Starring: Clancy Brown; Sheryl Lee; Moira Kelly; John Ashton
- Theme music composer: Charles Bernstein
- Country of origin: United States
- Original language: English

Production
- Executive producer: Laurie Levit
- Producer: Jay Benson
- Production locations: Karl Holton Camp - 12653 Little Tujunga Canyon Rd, Sylmar, California
- Cinematography: Isidore Mankofsky
- Editors: David Beatty; Jerrold D. Ludwig
- Running time: 240 minutes
- Production companies: Republic Pictures; Two Short Productions

Original release
- Network: NBC
- Release: February 17 – February 18, 1991

Love, Lies and Murder is a 1991 American miniseries starring Clancy Brown, Sheryl Lee, Moira Kelly, Tom Bower, John Ashton, and Cynthia Nixon. It is based on the 1985 murder of Linda Bailey Brown and Ann Rule's book If You Really Loved Me. The miniseries is four hours long and aired on NBC in two parts, the first on February 17, 1991, and the second on February 18, 1991.

== Plot ==
In 1985, Cinnamon Brown kills her stepmother by shooting her. Although she confessed to the crime, the lack of motive propels investigators to delve deeper into the case, and they discover that there is far more to it than originally thought.

== Cast ==
- Clancy Brown as David Brown
- Sheryl Lee as Patti Bailey
- Moira Kelly as Cinnamon Brown
- Shelley Morrison as Yolanda Brown
- Cathryn de Prume as Linda Bailey Brown
- Tom Bower as Leverette
- Ramon Bieri as Howard
- Cynthia Nixon as Donna
- Nestor Serrano as Gonzalez
- John M. Jackson as Sergeant Patterson
- John Ashton as Carrothers
- Steven Gilborn as Judge Cavanaugh

== Reception ==
Ken Tucker of Entertainment Weekly gave the film an A− in his review. Love, Lies and Murder was released in DVD format on July 24, 2012. Contrary to what some believe, this DVD version is not a bootleg as it was released by CBS Home Entertainment as a DVD-R which is Manufactured On Demand. Love, Lies and Murder was also released on Home Video on January 27, 1992, as a two-tape set and as a four side two disc Laserdisc set.

The second part was the second-highest viewed primetime show for the week of February 18–24, 1991 while, however, the first part was the 23rd most-watched show of the prior week, where it was beat in the ratings by the special titled Very Best of Ed Sullivan.
