= Josiah J. Evans =

American politician

Josiah James Evans
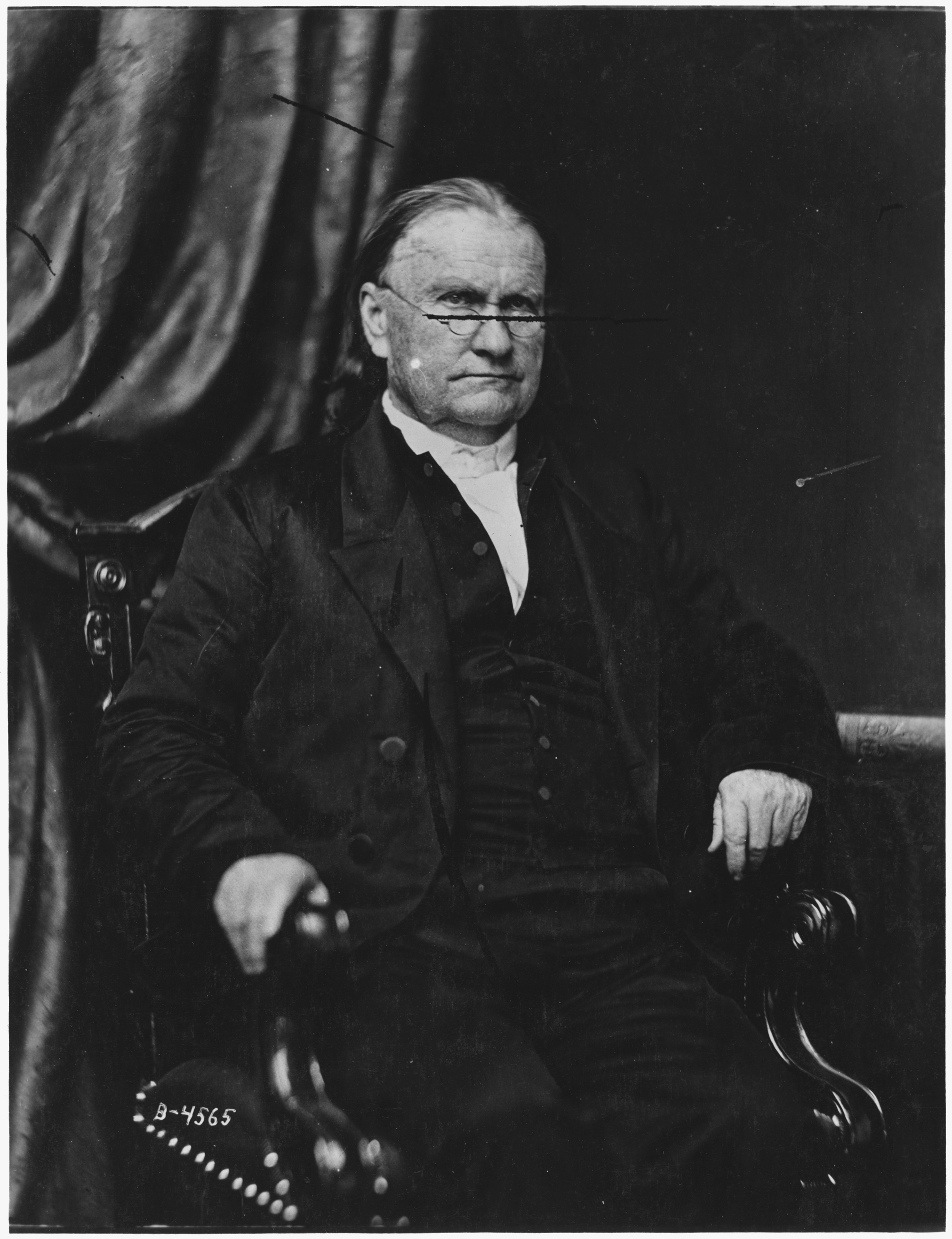

United States Senator from South Carolina
- In office March 4, 1853 – May 6, 1858
- Preceded by: William F. De Saussure
- Succeeded by: Arthur P. Hayne

Personal details
- Born: November 27, 1786 Marlboro County, South Carolina
- Died: May 6, 1858 (aged 71) Washington, D.C.
- Party: Democratic

Josiah James Evans (November 27, 1786 – May 6, 1858) was born in Marlborough district in South Carolina to Thomas Evans, a prominent Revolutionary War soldier and South Carolina legislator, and Elizabeth Hodges. He graduated third in his class from South Carolina College in 1808. In 1813, he married Dorthea DeWitt, daughter of Captain William DeWitt. Evans studied law under his brother-in-law and admitted to the bar in 1811.

He was elected to the South Carolina House of Representatives in 1812. During his legal career, he successfully defended the will of Mason Lee, a case that set precedent on the validity of wills. In 1829, he was appointed as a judge for the Court of General Sessions and Common Pleas. In 1835, he was appointed to the South Carolina Supreme Court, where he served until 1852.

In 1853, he was elected to the United States Senate. He served as a United States Senator from South Carolina for 1853 to 1858. He was a Democrat. During his time in the Senate he was chairman of the committees on auditing the contingency expenses of the Senate and Revolutionary Claims.

He died in Washington, D.C., shortly before his first term was to expire. He is buried at Trinity Episcopal Church near his ancestral home on Society Hill, Darlington County, South Carolina. Evans Correctional Institution is named in his memory.

== See also ==
- List of members of the United States Congress who died in office (1790–1899)

U.S. Senate
Preceded by William F. De Saussure	U.S. senator (Class 2) from South Carolina; 1853–1858; Served alongside: Andrew Butler, James H. Hammond	Succeeded by Arthur P. Hayne
