= Girl in the Bunker =

- Written by: Stephen Kemp
- Directed by: Stephen Kemp
- Starring: Julia Lalonde; Henry Thomas; Moira Kelly
- Countries of origin: Canada; United States
- Original language: English

Production
- Executive producer: Stephen Kemp
- Producers: Kim Bondi; Thomas Vencelides
- Cinematography: Fraser Brown
- Editor: Stephen Kemp
- Running time: 87 minutes
- Production companies: Cineflix Productions; Rare Fish Films

Original release
- Release: May 28, 2018

Girl in the Bunker is a 2018 TV film that aired on Lifetime that told about the kidnapping of Elizabeth Shoaf at the hands of Vinson Filyaw. The film stars Julia Lalonde, Henry Thomas, and Moira Kelly.

== Plot ==
A girl who is sick of being told what to do by her mother decides to walk home from school through the woods. She encounters a man who tells her he is a police officer and that she is under arrest.

== Cast ==
- Kallan Holley as Elizabeth Shoaf
- Henry Thomas as Vinson Filyaw
- Moira Kelly as Madeline Shoaf
- Jessica Greco as Katherine Heath
- Stephen Park as Don Shoaf
- Dimitri Komocsi as Bobby Shoaf
- Neil Napier as Sheriff Thompson
- Jeff Clark as Officer Samuels
- Jack Murray as Officer Kitson
