= McCormick Correctional Institution =

Men's state prison in South Carolina, United States

- Interactive map of McCormick Correctional Institution
- Location: McCormick, South Carolina; 33°55′46″N 82°15′03″W
- Status: Operational
- Security class: Maximum
- Capacity: 1124
- Opened: 1987
- Managed by: South Carolina Department of Corrections
- Website: Official website

McCormick Correctional Institution is a state prison for men located in McCormick, McCormick County, South Carolina, owned and operated by the South Carolina Department of Corrections.

The facility was opened in 1987, and houses 1124 inmates at maximum security.

== Notable inmates ==
- Stephen Ross Kelly - Murdered 18-year old Briana Rabon on February 25, 2014. Sentenced to 50 years without parole. The story was profiled on On the Case with Paula Zahn.
- Alex Murdaugh - Murdered his wife and son in 2021. Convicted in 2023.

== See also ==
- List of South Carolina state prisons
