= Barry Greenfield =

American investor/banker (d. 2012)

Barry Allen Greenfield was an American investor and investment banker who ran the Fidelity Fund from 1967 to 1999 taking it from a billion-dollar enterprise to a trillion-dollar one. He also served as Fidelity Investments' director of research and in 1986 founded the Fidelity Real Estate Investment Portfolio.

He graduated from Bates College in Lewiston, Maine in 1956 and went on to both become a trustee and manage the college's $183 million endowment. He was married to Nancy Goldberg Greenfield.

Greenfield died on August 20, 2012, in Delray Beach, Florida.
