= List of South Carolina state prisons =

This is a list of state prisons in South Carolina. It does not include federal prisons or county jails located in the state of South Carolina.

- Allendale Correctional Institution
- Broad River Correctional Institution
- Broad River Secure Facility
- Camille Griffin Graham Correctional Institution
- Evans Correctional Institution
- Goodman Correctional Institution (capacity 350)
- Kershaw Correctional Institution
- Kirkland Correctional Institution
- Leath Correctional Institution
- Lee Correctional Institution
- Lieber Correctional Institution
- Livesay Correctional Institution (capacity 530)
- MacDougall Correctional Institution (capacity 672)
- Manning Correctional Institution (capacity 919)
- McCormick Correctional Institution
- Palmer Pre-Release Center (capacity 292)
- Perry Correctional Institution (capacity 972)
- Ridgeland Correctional Institution
- Trenton Correctional Institution (capacity 719)
- Turbeville Correctional Institution
- Tyger River Correctional Institution
- Walden Correctional Institution (capacity 694)
- Wateree River Correctional Institution (capacity 884)

== Closed ==
- Campbell Pre-Release Center (closed 2014)
- Catawba Pre-Release Center (closed 2017)
- Coastal Pre-Release Center (closed 2015)
- Lower Savannah Pre-Release Center (closed 2016)
- South Carolina Penitentiary (demolished)
- Stevenson Correctional Institution (merged with Walden 2010)
- Watkins Pre-Release Center (closed 2012)
