= Lee Correctional Institution =

Prison in South Carolina, United States

Coordinates: 34°11′51″N 80°13′34″W

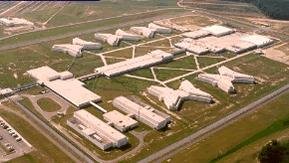
- Interactive map of Lee Correctional Institution
- Location: 990 Wisacky Highway Bishopville, South Carolina
- Security class: maximum security
- Capacity: 1,785
- Opened: 1993
- Managed by: South Carolina Department of Corrections

Lee Correctional Institution is the main high-security state prison for men located in Bishopville, South Carolina. On April 15, 2018, seven inmates were killed in the Lee Correctional Prison Riot. It was the deadliest U.S. prison riot in the past 25 years and the fifth deadliest in American history.

== History ==
The facility opened in 1993 to replace the decommissioned Central Correctional Institution which had been the state's primary prison for over 130 years. At the time, Lee cost $46 million to construct. It remains the largest maximum-security prison for males in the South Carolina state system. It is often characterized as being the most dangerous.

Prisoners took control over portions of the prison on two separate incidents prior to the 2018 riot which was the deadliest U.S. prison riot in the past 25 years. The prison has had a long history of violent incidents.

The riot was the inspiration for the 2018 U.S. prison strike.

== See also ==
- List of South Carolina state prisons
- Attica Prison riot
- Lee Correctional Prison Riot
