= Moira Kelly =

American actress (born 1968)

- Born: March 6, 1968 (age 58); New York City, New York, U.S.
- Other name: Moira Hewitt
- Education: Connetquot High School; Marymount Manhattan College
- Occupation: Actress
- Years active: 1988–present
- Spouse: Steve Hewitt (m. 2000)
- Children: 2

Moira Kelly (born March 6, 1968) is an American actress known for portraying Kate Moseley in the 1992 film The Cutting Edge as well as single mother Karen Roe on the teen drama One Tree Hill. She portrayed Courtney in the 1994 film, “With Honors,” She is also known for playing Donna Hayward in Twin Peaks: Fire Walk with Me, replacing Lara Flynn Boyle in the prequel to the 1990 TV series Twin Peaks. Other roles include Dorothy Day in Entertaining Angels: The Dorothy Day Story, White House media consultant Mandy Hampton in the first season of The West Wing, and the voice of Simba's love interest Nala in The Lion King and its direct-to-video sequels The Lion King II: Simba's Pride and The Lion King 1½. She also played Hetty Kelly and Oona O'Neill in Chaplin.

== Early life and education ==
Moira Kelly was born in Queens, New York, on March 6, 1968. She is the daughter of a trained concert violinist, Peter, and a nurse, Anne, who are Irish immigrants. Kelly is the third of six children and was raised in Ronkonkoma, New York, as a Catholic. Kelly attended Connetquot Senior High School in Bohemia, Long Island, graduating in the class of 1986. Later, she attended Marymount Manhattan College.

In her youth, Kelly was cast in a small role in her high school's 1984 production of Annie. Due to illness, the girl playing Miss Hannigan was replaced, causing a series of cast changes leading to her choice of career. A devout Catholic, Kelly had to decide between acting and her childhood ambition of becoming a nun.

== Career ==
Kelly made her professional acting debut in the fact-based made-for-TV movie Love, Lies and Murder, playing teenager Cinnamon Brown, who was coerced by her father into killing his wife and her stepmother, Linda Brown. She was originally going to have a starring role as Polly Pry in Trey Parker and Matt Stone's Cannibal! The Musical, but was convinced not to do so by her agent out of concerns it could ruin her career, and was ultimately replaced by Toddy Walters, though she was still credited in the end credits under her initials "M.K." as "the Dropout". She went on to have small roles in the films The Boy Who Cried Bitch, Hi-Life, and Billy Bathgate before being cast as Donna Hayward in Twin Peaks: Fire Walk with Me. For that film, she went home and got permission from her priest because of an explicit sex scene. In the same year, she starred opposite D. B. Sweeney in the romantic comedy The Cutting Edge (during whose filming she suffered a broken ankle, which cost her a part in Penny Marshall's film A League of Their Own), and played two roles opposite Robert Downey Jr. in Chaplin. According to a TV Guide interview, before taking on her role in Daybreak, Kelly once again asked her priest for advice: "Being a Catholic, I wondered if it would be against my religion to play a girl who has premarital sex." The priest told her "it was okay, as long as my artistic intentions were true and I wasn't doing it for the notoriety or the money."

She has since appeared in the films With Honors, Little Odessa, The Tie That Binds, and Dangerous Beauty, amongst others, and provided the adult voice of Nala in Disney's The Lion King, The Lion King II: Simba's Pride, and The Lion King 1½. In her independent film career, Kelly had the starring role of activist Dorothy Day in Entertaining Angels: The Dorothy Day Story and starred alongside Glenn Close in The Safety of Objects. She played Helen Keller in the made-for-TV movie Monday After the Miracle, which broadcast on November 15, 1998, on CBS.

Kelly starred in the CBS drama To Have & to Hold opposite Jason Beghe before playing Mandy Hampton in the first season of The West Wing. In 2003, Kelly began playing single mother Karen Roe on the teen drama One Tree Hill. She also directed two episodes of the series: "Resolve" (2007) and "I Slept with Someone in Fall Out Boy and All I Got Was This Stupid Song Written About Me" (2006). In the fifth season, she ceased to be a regular cast member, but made guest appearances in the 100th episode and the sixth-season finale. She has made guest appearances in television shows such as Heroes, Law & Order, and Numb3rs. Kelly has also appeared in the films Remember the Daze, A Smile as Big as the Moon, Taken Back: Finding Haley, and Girl in the Bunker.

Kelly reprised her role of Nala from the Disney animated movie series The Lion King in adventure video game Disney Dreamlight Valley released in 2023.

== Personal life ==
On August 5, 2000, Kelly married Steve Hewitt, a Texas businessman. They have two children, a daughter Ella and a son Eamon. Kelly had previously maintained a residence in Wilmington, North Carolina, for eleven years.

== Filmography ==
=== Film ===
Year	Title	Role	Notes
1991	The Boy Who Cried Bitch	Jessica Rosenberg	
1991	Billy Bathgate	Becky	
1992	Thirty Below Zero	Lucy	Short
1992	The Cutting Edge	Kate Moseley	
1992	Twin Peaks: Fire Walk with Me	Donna Hayward	
1992	Chaplin	Hetty Kelly / Oona O'Neill	
1993	Cannibal! The Musical	"The Dropout"	Credited under "M.K.", dropped out early in production
1994	With Honors	Courtney Blumenthal	
1994	The Lion King	Adult Nala (voice)	
1994	Little Odessa	Alla Shustervich	
1995	The Tie That Binds	Dana Clifton	
1996	Unhook the Stars	Ann Mary Margaret "Annie" Hawks	
1996	Entertaining Angels: The Dorothy Day Story	Dorothy Day	
1997	Love Walked In	Vera	
1997	Changing Habits	Soosh Teague	
1997	Drive, She Said	Nadine Ship	
1998	Dangerous Beauty	Beatrice Venier	
1998	Hi-Life	Susan	
1998	The Lion King II: Simba's Pride	Nala (voice)	Video
1999	Henry Hill	Cynthia	
2001	The Safety of Objects	Susan Train	
2004	A Woman Reported	Woman	Short
2004	The Lion King 1½	Nala (voice)	Video
2006	Two Tickets to Paradise	Kate	
2007	Remember the Daze	Mrs. Ford	
2014	Twin Peaks: The Missing Pieces	Donna Hayward	Deleted Scenes from Twin Peaks: Fire Walk with Me (1992)

=== Television ===
Year	Title	Role	Notes
1991	Love, Lies and Murder	Cinnamon Brown	TV miniseries
1993	Daybreak	Blue	TV film
1998	Monday After the Miracle	Helen Keller	TV film
1998	To Have & to Hold	Annie Cornell	Main role
1999–2000	The West Wing	Mandy Hampton	Regular role
2002	Hack	Vanessa Griffin	"My Brother's Keeper"
2002	The Twilight Zone	Elizabeth Carter	"Found and Lost"
2003–2009	One Tree Hill	Karen Roe	Main role
2008	Law & Order	Katherine Donovan	"Betrayal"
2009	Heroes	Abby Collins	"Building 26"
2010	Numb3rs	Mary Paulson	"Growin' Up"
2012	A Smile as Big as the Moon	Darcy Kersjes	TV film
2012	Taken Back: Finding Haley	Karen	TV film
2013	Drop Dead Diva	Cindy Kasper	"50 Shades of Grayson"
2017	Deadly Sorority	Prof. Amy Thomas	TV film
2018	Girl in the Bunker	Madeline Shoaf	TV film
2019	The Resident	Annie	3 episodes
2019	Christmas In Louisiana	Charlotte Winter	TV film
2021	Panic	Laura Cortez	7 episodes
2022	My Southern Family Christmas	Jennifer Bergeron	TV film (Hallmark Channel)
2023	Citadel	Joe	5 episodes
2025	Love of the Irish	Helen	TV film (Hallmark Channel)

=== Video games ===
Year	Title	Role	Notes
2023	Disney Dreamlight Valley	Nala (voice)	Character added in an April 2023 update

=== As a director ===
Year	Title	Notes
2006–2007	One Tree Hill	Television series; 2 episodes
