= Sami's Law =

American state law

Sami's Law is a piece of federal legislation in the United States introduced by Representative Christopher Smith of New Jersey as H.R. 3262. The bill was introduced in May 2019 and was signed into law on January 5, 2023 by President Joe Biden. The bill would require ridesharing company drivers to prominently display lighted signs and a scannable QR code as a safety regulation in light of issues tied to the ride-sharing service. The bill would criminalize misrepresentation of being a driver of a ride-sharing service nationwide. The bill was named for South Carolina college student Samantha Josephson, who had ordered an Uber but mistakenly entered an imposter vehicle and was killed by the driver. On June 14, 2019, the law was referred to the Subcommittee on Highways and Transit.

A similar law was enacted in New Jersey, in part because Josephson was from Robbinsville, New Jersey. The law requires ridesharing company drivers to display two illuminated signs and have a scannable QR code.
