= Murder of Samantha Josephson =

2019 murder of college student in South Carolina, US

- Undated photo of Samantha Josephson
- Date: March 29, 2019; 7 years ago
- Attack type: Murder by stabbing, kidnapping
- Victim: Samantha Lee Josephson
- Perpetrator: Nathaniel David Rowland
- Motive: Thrill killing
- Verdict: Guilty on all counts
- Convictions: Murder; Kidnapping; Criminal possession of a weapon
- Sentence: Two life sentences without the possibility of parole plus 5 years

Samantha Josephson, a student at University of South Carolina, in Columbia, South Carolina, was murdered on March 29, 2019. Josephson, 21, had ordered an Uber rideshare car, and mistakenly entered a car that she thought was her ride. A local man, Nathaniel Rowland, the driver of the car, used childproof locks to prevent Josephson from leaving the vehicle, then kidnapped and murdered her. He left her body near New Zion, South Carolina – 65 miles (105 km) from Columbia, where she had entered his car.

Rowland was arrested the next day, and charged with kidnapping and murdering Josephson. A trial began on July 20, 2021. On July 27, the jury found Rowland guilty of Josephson's kidnapping and murder and the judge sentenced him to life in prison.

The killing attracted national attention and led to discussion about the dangers of ridesharing and the importance of ensuring that a rideshare car is being driven by a registered driver prior to entering. The murder led to the passage of Sami's Law in New Jersey, which enhances protections for drivers and passengers using rideshare services. Legislation of the same name at the federal level was signed into law by President Joe Biden on January 5, 2023.

== Victim ==
Samantha Lee Josephson was born in Princeton, New Jersey, and grew up in Robbinsville, New Jersey. She attended the University of South Carolina, where she majored in political science. Josephson, who was a senior in college at the time of her death, planned on graduating in 2019, and attending Drexel University School of Law. She earned a full scholarship to Drexel University, as well as a partial scholarship to Rutgers and aspired to practice international law.

Josephson, a member of the Alpha Gamma Delta sorority, studied abroad in Barcelona and visited Madrid and Paris during her time at South Carolina. Josephson is buried at the Perrineville Jewish Cemetery in Perrineville, New Jersey.

== Murder ==
Josephson spent the night before her death in the Five Points district in downtown Columbia with friends. At about 2 am she decided to leave the Bird Dog bar and ordered an Uber. According to surveillance footage, at 2:09, a black Chevrolet Impala, driven by Rowland, pulled up beside her. Josephson entered the vehicle, thinking it was her Uber driver. According to authorities, Rowland activated the child locks so that the doors could only be opened from the outside, trapping Josephson inside the vehicle.

Using a two-bladed knife, Rowland proceeded to inflict roughly 120 stab wounds upon Josephson. During the attack, Josephson attempted to shield herself. One of Rowland's strikes went completely through her right hand, as she likely used it to protect herself. Rowland also stabbed Josephson in her head with enough force that the knife went through her skull to her brain. He also stabbed her in the carotid, one of two main arteries that carries blood to the head. Many of the wounds, especially those in her right neck and right shoulder, were close together, most likely resulting from being rapidly inflicted stab wounds. Additionally, Josephson suffered a severed hyoid bone, as well as stab wounds to her face, neck, shoulder, torso, back, lung, leg, and feet. She bled profusely, ultimately dying within 10 to 20 minutes, according to the pathologist who conducted an autopsy on her body. Investigators believe Rowland dragged Josephson's body to the New Zion field where she was later discovered.

== Investigation and criminal proceedings ==
Josephson's roommates became concerned and reported her missing the day after she accidentally entered the vehicle. Her body was then found in a field in the town of New Zion in Clarendon County by turkey hunters fourteen hours after the kidnapping.

According to the police, the area where Josephson's body was located is where Rowland recently resided. The autopsy showed that she died of multiple sharp-force injuries. Specifically, the pathologist determined that she suffered approximately one hundred and twenty separate stab wounds; the pathologist could not determine an exact number of wounds because there were so many. Josephson's autopsy also revealed the extent of her blood loss—the human body typically has at least 4 litres (8.5 US pt) of blood, but Josephson's body only contained 20 millilitres (0.70 imp fl oz; 0.68 US fl oz).

Nathaniel Rowland was seen by police driving a car that matched the description of the one Josephson was seen entering in the surveillance video. When Rowland, who was driving around the Five Points area where Josephson had been kidnapped, was pulled over, he got out of the car and fled. He was caught and arrested at 3:00 am on March 30. Inside the car, police found a container of liquid bleach, germicidal wipes, and window cleaner. The car also contained Josephson's phone and a large amount of her blood, which was in the passenger seat and in the trunk. The child locks were activated, which police believe prevented Josephson from escaping.

When investigators searched the trash behind Rowland's girlfriend's residence, they uncovered cleaning supplies and a two-bladed knife, both of which had Josephson's blood on them. Josephson's blood was also found on a sock and a bandana, both owned by Rowland. Additionally, Josephson's DNA was collected from Rowland's fingernails. While searching for fingerprint evidence, investigators also uncovered a bare footprint impression on the rear driver-side window of Rowland's Impala — using latent print analysis, forensic experts were able to conclusively match the patterns on this footprint with the unique friction ridge patterns on the soles of Josephson's bare feet. Josephson's prints were also found on several other items in Rowland's possession.

Rowland was charged with kidnapping, murder, and possession of a weapon during the commission of a crime. In addition to Josephson's murder, Rowland is alleged to have sold items that were stolen from another woman during a kidnapping in Columbia. The alleged victim was carjacked by two men while at a traffic light in October 2018. The carjackers allegedly physically assaulted the victim and then forced her to drive to an ATM where they robbed her of money, before forcing her to drive to her home where they again robbed her of items including a PlayStation 4. According to Richland County deputies, hours after the alleged kidnapping Rowland sold some of the items stolen from the woman, including the PlayStation 4, at a pawn shop. Rowland was charged with obtaining goods under false pretenses.

On June 9, 2020, Nathaniel Rowland was denied bond. In a virtual hearing, family members for both Josephson and Rowland delivered statements in front of Judge DeAndrea Benjamin.

On July 20, 2021, Rowland's trial began, with State Circuit Judge Clifton Newman presiding. During the trial, prosecutors called 31 witnesses, including the turkey hunter who found Josephson's body, a cellphone store owner who testified that Rowland unsuccessfully attempted to sell him Josephson's phone the day after she went missing, Rowland's former girlfriend, and numerous State Law Enforcement Division investigators and other experts. Rowland's defense attorneys called no witnesses and Rowland did not testify.

On July 27, 2021, after a little over one hour of deliberation, a jury found Rowland guilty of kidnapping and murdering Josephson, and of possessing a weapon during a violent crime. After Rowland's conviction, Judge Newman sentenced Rowland to life in prison. "For whoever asked me for leniency, that's not part of my DNA," said Judge Newman, characterizing Rowland as being "heartless," and added that the case was the "most severe" murder he had ever seen in court.

In August 2024, the South Carolina Court of Appeals upheld the conviction. The Josephson family and Fifth Circuit Solicitor Byron Gipson made statements expressing relief at the Appeals' ruling. In September 2024, the same court denied a second request from Rowland to get another hearing.

== Legacy ==
After their daughter's death, Josephson's parents established the What's My Name Foundation. The foundation works to educate people about ride-share safety, along with supporting charitable foundations and awarding college scholarships. Josephson's parents have worked with lawmakers to advocate for policies that enhance safety for ride-share passengers. Several laws have been enacted since Josephson's death. On June 5, 2019, the Samantha L. Josephson Ridesharing Safety Act was signed into law in South Carolina. The act requires ride-share vehicles to display license plate numbers on the front. The law also subjects people who misrepresent themselves as authorized transportation network company (TNC) drivers to a maximum US$500 fine, and those who use TNC ride-sharing application in the furtherance of criminal activity to a maximum $1,000 fine. In addition to facing fines, one guilty of misrepresenting themselves as an authorized TNC driver may be incarcerated for up to 30 days while one who uses ride-sharing in the furtherance of criminal activity may face up to 2 years of incarceration.

Also in June 2019, New Jersey Governor Phil Murphy signed Sami's Law, which requires more identification on ride-share vehicles. Specifically, the law requires companies to issue two "credential placards" to drivers of ride-share vehicles. These placards, which are to be placed on the driver and passenger side back windows, must have the driver's name and photo, along with their license plate number. Ride-share vehicles must also have an identifying marker on the front windshield and back window. Additionally, companies must give ride-share drivers two barcodes that passengers can scan to confirm the driver's identity.

Josephson's murder prompted lawmakers in North Carolina to propose the Passenger Protection Act. The act requires ride-share drivers to display a printed license plate number on the front of their vehicles and, as of July 1, 2020, to have illuminated signs on their vehicles. The act creates a new criminal penalty for impersonating a ride-share driver, and makes assaulting a ride-share driver a misdemeanor. Additionally, it provides $500,000 in grants for colleges to educate students about ride-share safety and creates a study commission to examine ways to improve ride-share safety. The law was signed by Governor Roy Cooper in August 2019.

Additional legislation aimed at protecting ride-share users is pending. In April 2019, Senator Anna Kaplan introduced the Samantha L. Josephson Ridesharing Safety Act to the New York Senate. The act requires ride-share drivers to "display visible, consistent, and distinctive signage clearly identifying the rideshare service provider at all times when the driver is active on the service platform or providing rideshare service." These signs must be readable from a distance of 50 feet during daylight hours and should be illuminated at night so that the logo is patently visible.

Josephson's parents have worked with lawmakers in the United States Congress to craft a federal law to enhance ride-share safety. The bill, also titled "Sami's Law," was introduced on June 13, 2019. It requires ride-share vehicles to have front license plates and illuminated windshield signs along with scanable or quick-response codes on the sides. States that do not comply would be penalized by losing 1% of federal highway funding. The law would also establish a 15-member advisory council, called SAMI's Council, which would be made of federal agency and public stakeholders. The Council would report to the Secretary of Transportation and work to advance safety standards in the rideshare industry. The bill would also regulate the sale of official ride-share signage, require a Government Accountability Office (GAO) to report on incidents of assault and abuse of passengers and drivers, and require the GAO to examine the nature and specifics of background checks that are conducted by companies and the state standards of background checks. The federal Sami's Law was referred to several subcommittees and in July 2020, the U.S. House of Representatives unanimously approved it. Josephson's death prompted the University of South Carolina to launch a campaign titled "What's My Name" to help students stay safe while using ride-sharing services. On December 28, 2022, federal legislation authorizing a study of ride-sharing safety practices, with passage by the US House and Senate, was sent to President Biden's desk. It was signed into law on January 5, 2023. The Josephson family attended the 2023 State of the Union address as guests of New Jersey Congressman Chris Smith.

Josephson was awarded a posthumous political science degree in May 2019 at what would have been her graduation ceremony. Her mother accepted her diploma and college possessions on her behalf.

The Township of Robbinsville built a patio and rock garden, dedicating the landmarks to Josephson.

== See also ==
- List of kidnappings
