= South Carolina Department of Corrections =

- Abbreviation: SCDC
- Motto: Safety, Service, Stewardship

Agency overview
- Formed: 1866
- Preceding agency: South Carolina State Penitentiary
- Employees: Approx. 4,500
- Annual budget: $427 million (FY 2018)

Jurisdictional structure
- Operations jurisdiction: South Carolina, United States
- Map of South Carolina Department of Corrections's jurisdiction
- Area: 32,020 square miles (82,900 km^{2})
- Population: 4,479,800 (2008 est.)
- General nature: Civilian police

Operational structure
- Headquarters: Columbia, South Carolina
- Elected officer responsible: Henry McMaster, Governor of South Carolina
- Agency executive: Joel Anderson, Acting Director

Facilities
- Institutions: 21

Website
- SCDC Website

The South Carolina Department of Corrections (SCDC) is the agency responsible for corrections in the U.S. state of South Carolina. It currently has about 4,500 employees and just over 15,000 inmates, in 21 institutions. The agency has its headquarters in Columbia.

== History ==
The South Carolina penal system was essentially founded in 1866, when the first state penitentiary was constructed. The SCDC was created in 1960, when the state governor decided to end abuses in the previous system (particularly the use of convict labor on private property as a form of political reward). The new SCDC removed chains and stripes from inmates' uniforms, and it established inmate education programs.

The numbers of inmates since the SCDC creation are as follows: 2,073 (1960); 2,705 (1970); 7,869 (1980); 16,149 (1990); 22,053 (2000); 24,710 (2010); 16,169 (2020).

== Operations ==
The Palmetto Unified School District (PUSD), established in 1981, provides educational services to inmates in the system. The district board of trustees meetings are held at the William D. Leeke Administration Building.

In 2018, press reports indicated the department was short five hundred corrections officers.

=== Death row ===
Even though the main state penitentiary is Lee Correctional Institution, the state's death row for men is located at Broad River Correctional Institution. The state's death row for women is located at the Camille Griffin Graham Correctional Institution. Executions occur at the Broad River Correctional Institution.

From 1912 to January 1990 male death row inmates were housed in the Central Correctional Institution (CCI). BRCI held male death row inmates from January 1990 to April 12, 1997, when male death row inmates were moved to Lieber. In September 2017, male death row inmates were moved to Kirkland. From 1912 to 1986 executions were carried out at CCI. From 1990 onwards executions occur at BRCI.

== Fallen officers ==
Since the establishment of the South Carolina Department of Corrections, four officers have died in the line of duty, the last of whom was Captain John Olin Sanders, on December 12, 1937

== See also ==
- Lee Correctional Prison Riot
- List of South Carolina state prisons
- List of law enforcement agencies in South Carolina
- List of United States state correction agencies
- List of people executed in South Carolina
- Capital punishment in South Carolina
