= 2026–27 Marist Red Foxes women's basketball team =

American college basketball season

2026–27 Marist Red Foxes women's basketball
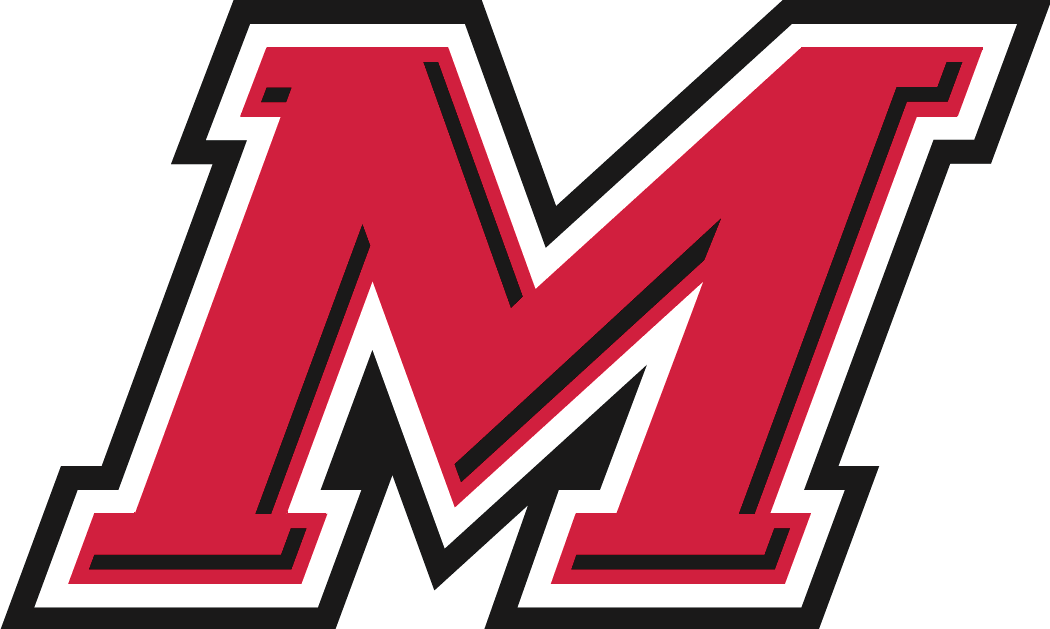
- Conference: Metro Conference
- Record: 0–0 (0–0 Metro)
- Head coach: Erin Doughty (4th season)
- Assistant coaches: Tiana Jones; Kiah Gillespie; Zakiyah Saunders; Gabi Mendonca
- Home arena: McCann Arena

2026–27 Metro Conference women's basketball standings
| | Conf. | | | | Overall |
| Team | W | | L | PCT | W | | L | PCT |
|---|---|---|---|---|---|---|---|---|
| Canisius | 0 | – | 0 | – | 0 | – | 0 | – |
| Fairfield | 0 | – | 0 | – | 0 | – | 0 | – |
| Iona | 0 | – | 0 | – | 0 | – | 0 | – |
| Manhattan | 0 | – | 0 | – | 0 | – | 0 | – |
| Marist | 0 | – | 0 | – | 0 | – | 0 | – |
| Merrimack | 0 | – | 0 | – | 0 | – | 0 | – |
| Mount St. Mary's | 0 | – | 0 | – | 0 | – | 0 | – |
| Niagara | 0 | – | 0 | – | 0 | – | 0 | – |
| Quinnipiac | 0 | – | 0 | – | 0 | – | 0 | – |
| Rider | 0 | – | 0 | – | 0 | – | 0 | – |
| Sacred Heart | 0 | – | 0 | – | 0 | – | 0 | – |
| Saint Peter's | 0 | – | 0 | – | 0 | – | 0 | – |
| Siena | 0 | – | 0 | – | 0 | – | 0 | – |
† 2027 Metro Conference tournament winner

The 2026–27 Marist Red Foxes women's basketball team will represent Marist University during the 2026–27 NCAA Division I women's basketball season. The Red Foxes, led by fourth-year head coach Erin Doughty, will play their home games at McCann Arena in Poughkeepsie, New York, and compete as a member of the newly renamed Metro Conference.

== Previous season ==
The Red Foxes finished the 2025–26 season 11–20 overall and 8–12 in MAAC play, to finish ninth place in the conference. As the No. 9 seed in the MAAC tournament, they lost 55–64 to No. 8 Manhattan in the first round to end their season.

== Offseason ==
=== Departures ===
Marist departures
| Name | Number | Pos. | Height | Year | Hometown | Reason for departure |
|---|---|---|---|---|---|---|
| Jackie Piddock | 2 | Guard | 5'8" | Senior | Adams, NY | Graduated |
| Ciara Croker | 22 | Forward | 6'0" | Senior | New Rochelle, NY | Graduated |
| Lexie Tarul | 23 | Guard | 5'10" | (redshirt) Senior | The Bronx, NY | Graduated |

=== Incoming transfers ===
Marist incoming transfers
| Name | Number | Pos. | Height | Year | Hometown | Previous school |
|---|---|---|---|---|---|---|
| Dilan Tubbs | 9 | Forward | 6'0" | Sophomore | Minneapolis, MN | TCU (student only) |
| Claudia Clement Marsan | 20 | Forward | 6'3" | Senior | Barcelona, Spain | Delaware |

=== Recruiting class ===
There was no 2026 recruiting class.

== Roster ==
2026–27 Marist Red Foxes women's basketball team
Players
Coaches

| Pos. | # | Name | Height | Year | Previous school | Hometown |
|---|---|---|---|---|---|---|
| G | 0 | Catie Klemm | 5 ft 10 in (1.78 m) | Fr | Ridgewood High School | Ridgewood, NJ |
| G | 1 | Malea Egan | 5 ft 7 in (1.7 m) | Sr | Colstrip High School; Montana State | Sacramento, CA |
| G/F | 2 | Madison Ohm | 5 ft 11 in (1.8 m) | Fr | Byron High School | Kasson, MN |
| G/F | 3 | Justine Henry | 6 ft 0 in (1.83 m) | So | The Mary Louis Academy | Long Island, NY |
| G | 4 | Kasey Bretones | 5 ft 11 in (1.8 m) | Jr | Mainland Regional High School; UMass | Linwood, NJ |
| G | 5 | Julia Corsentino | 5 ft 8 in (1.73 m) | Sr | Rumson-Fair Haven High School | Fair Haven, NJ |
| F | 9 | Dilan Tubbs | 6 ft 0 in (1.83 m) | So | DeLaSalle High School | Minneapolis, MN |
| F | 10 | Karly Fischer | 6 ft 2 in (1.88 m) | Sr | Albertus Magnus High School; Fairfield | Tappan, NY |
| G | 11 | Chloe Escanillas | 5 ft 9 in (1.75 m) | Jr | Rutgers Prep | Edison, NJ |
| F | 20 | Claudia Clement Marsan | 6 ft 3 in (1.91 m) | Sr | Escola Pia Balmes; Delaware | Barcelona, Spain |
| G | 21 | Danielle Williamsen | 5 ft 7 in (1.7 m) | Jr | St. Joseph by-the-Sea High School | Staten Island, NY |
| G/F | 22 | Ryan Oldaker | 5 ft 11 in (1.8 m) | Fr | South Fayette High School | Pittsburgh, PA |
| F | 24 | Kate Robbins | 6 ft 2 in (1.88 m) | Sr | Upper St. Clair High School | Pittsburgh, PA |
| G | 30 | Morgan Tompkins | 6 ft 0 in (1.83 m) | GS | Red Hook High School | Red Hook, NY |
| G | 33 | Elle Bruschuk | 5 ft 11 in (1.8 m) | Jr | Willowbrook High School; Wright State | Villa Park, IL |

Head coach

- Erin Doughty (Marist)

Assistant coach(es)

- Tiana Jones (Drexel)
- Kiah Gillespie (Florida State)
- Zakiya Saunders (Central Florida)
- Gabi Mendonca (Connecticut)

Legend

- (C) Team captain
- (S) Suspended
- (I) Ineligible
- (W) Walk-on
- Injured
- Current redshirt

Roster
Last update: September 11, 2026

== Schedule and results ==
| Date time, TV | Rank^{#} | Opponent^{#} | Result | Record | High points | High rebounds | High assists | Site (attendance) city, state |
Non-conference regular season
| November 2, 2026*; TBA | | at Drexel | | | | | | Daskalakis Athletic Center; Philadelphia, PA |
| November 5, 2026*; TBA | | at Bryant; AE–Metro Challenge | | | | | | Chace Athletic Center; Smithfield, RI |
| November 8, 2026*; 5:00 p.m. | | NJIT; AE–Metro Challenge | | | | | | McCann Arena; Poughkeepsie, NY |
| November 11, 2026*; TBA | | at Duquesne | | | | | | UPMC Cooper Fieldhouse; Pittsburgh, PA |
| November 15, 2026*; 2:00 p.m. | | Lafayette | | | | | | McCann Arena; Poughkeepsie, NY |
| November 17, 2026*; TBA | | at Monmouth | | | | | | OceanFirst Bank Center; West Long Branch, NJ |
| November 23, 2026*; 7:00 p.m. | | Binghamton | | | | | | McCann Arena; Poughkeepsie, NY |
| November 28, 2026*; 7:00 p.m. | | Yale | | | | | | McCann Arena; Poughkeepsie, NY |
| December 2, 2026*; TBA | | at Brown | | | | | | Pizzitola Sports Center; Providence, RI |
| December 5, 2026*; 5:00 p.m. | | St. Bonaventure | | | | | | McCann Arena; Poughkeepsie, NY |
| December 12, 2026*; TBA | | Boston University | | | | | | Case Gym; Boston, MA |
Metro Conference regular season
| December 19, 2026; TBA | | at Sacred Heart | | | | | | William H. Pitt Center; Fairfield, CT |
| December 21, 2026; 7:00 p.m. | | Iona | | | | | | McCann Arena; Poughkeepsie, NY |
| December 29, 2026; 2:00 p.m. | | Mount St. Mary's | | | | | | McCann Arena; Poughkeepsie, NY |
| January 1, 2027; 1:00 p.m. | | at Canisius | | | | | | Koessler Athletic Center; Buffalo, NY |
| January 3, 2027; TBA | | at Niagara | | | | | | Gallagher Center; Lewiston, NY |
| January 7, 2027; 11:00 a.m. | | Merrimack | | | | | | McCann Arena; Poughkeepsie, NY |
| January 9, 2027; 7:00 p.m. | | Quinnipiac | | | | | | McCann Arena; Poughkeepsie, NY |
| January 13, 2027; TBA | | at Manhattan | | | | | | Draddy Gymnasium; Riverdale, NY |
| January 18, 2027; 2:00 p.m. | | Rider | | | | | | McCann Arena; Poughkeepsie, NY |
| January 21, 2027; TBA | | at Merrimack | | | | | | Lawler Arena; North Andover, MA |
| January 23, 2027; 7:00 p.m. | | Sacred Heart | | | | | | McCann Arena; Poughkeepsie, NY |
| January 28, 2027; TBA | | at Iona | | | | | | Hynes Athletics Center; New Rochelle, NY |
| January 30, 2027; TBA | | at Siena | | | | | | UHY Center; Loudonville, NY |
| February 4, 2027; 7:00 p.m. | | Niagara | | | | | | McCann Arena; Poughkeepsie, NY |
| February 6, 2027; 7:00 p.m. | | Canisius | | | | | | McCann Arena; Poughkeepsie, NY |
| February 11, 2027; TBA | | at Fairfield | | | | | | Leo D. Mahoney Arena; Fairfield, CT |
| February 13, 2027; 7:00 p.m. | | Saint Peter's | | | | | | McCann Arena; Poughkeepsie, NY |
| February 18, 2027; TBA | | at Mount St. Mary's | | | | | | Knott Arena; Emmitsburg, MD |
| February 20, 2027; TBA | | at Rider | | | | | | Canastra Hammer Arena; Lawrenceville, NJ |
| February 27, 2027; 7:00 p.m. | | Siena | | | | | | McCann Arena; Poughkeepsie, NY |
*Non-conference game. ^{#}Rankings from AP Poll. (#) Tournament seedings in parentheses. All times are in Eastern.
