= 2026–27 Siena Saints women's basketball team =

American college basketball season

2026–27 Siena Saints women's basketball
- Conference: Metro Conference
- Record: 3–4 (0–0 Metro)
- Head coach: Terry Primm (3rd season)
- Assistant coaches: Chad Smith; Erica Covile; Olivia Travis
- Home arena: UHY Center

2026–27 Metro Conference women's basketball standings
	Conf.				Overall
Team	W		L	PCT	W		L	PCT
Fairfield	0	–	0	–	3	–	2	.600
Iona	0	–	0	–	3	–	3	.500
Manhattan	0	–	0	–	3	–	3	.500
Canisius	0	–	0	–	2	–	2	.500
Quinnipiac	0	–	0	–	3	–	4	.429
Rider	0	–	0	–	2	–	3	.400
Siena	0	–	0	–	2	–	4	.333
Saint Peter's	0	–	0	–	1	–	3	.250
Sacred Heart	0	–	0	–	1	–	4	.200
Marist	0	–	0	–	1	–	5	.167
Merrimack	0	–	0	–	0	–	6	.000
Mount St. Mary's	0	–	0	–	0	–	6	.000
Niagara	0	–	0	–	0	–	6	.000
† 2027 Metro Conference tournament winner As of November 22, 2026

The 2026–27 Siena Saints women's basketball team currently represents Siena University during the 2026–27 NCAA Division I women's basketball season. The Saints, led by third-year head coach Terry Primm, play their home games at the UHY Center in Loudonville, New York, and compete as a member of the newly renamed Metro Conference.

== Previous season ==
The Saints finished the 2025–26 season 13–17 overall and 11–9 in MAAC play, to finish in a tie for fifth place in the conference with Mount St. Mary's. As the No. 5 seed in the MAAC tournament, they lost 50–59 to No. 4 Iona in the quarterfinals.

=== Departures ===
Siena departures
Name	Num.	Pos.	Height	Year	Hometown	Reason for departure
Jamariah Turner	0	Guard	5'9"	Graduate Student	Huntsville, AL	Graduated
Valencia Fontenelle-Posson	4	Guard	5'10"	Graduate Student	Guilderland, NY	Transferred to McNeese
Azera Gates	5	Guard	5'5"	Freshman	Albany, NY	TBD; not listed on roster
Zyriah Price	6	Guard	6'0"	Sophome	Huntsville, AL	Transferred to Hawaii
Dallas Pierce	7	Guard	5'10"	Junior	New Castle, DE	Transferred to Delaware State
Alexis Rosenfeld	11	Guard	6'3"	(redshirt) Freshman	Ridgewood, NJ	TBD; not listed on roster
Alden Yergey	12	Guard	5'9"	(redshirt) Sophomore	Nokesville, VA	Transferred to UMBC
Genevieve Wedemeyer	22	Guard	5'8"	Junior	Hamburg, Germany	Transferred to Bryant
Olivia Watkins	24	Guard	6'1"	Freshman	Lawton, OK	Transferred to UNT Dallas (D-II)
Garrisen Freeman	33	Guard	5'10"	Graduate Student	Las Vegas, NV	Graduated

=== Incoming transfers ===
Siena incoming transfers
Name	Num.	Pos.	Height	Year	Hometown	Previous school
Nila Giraud	2	Guard	6'0"	Sophomore	Rahway, NJ	Albany
Dani Garcia Gasco	8	Guard	6'1"	Junior	Sevilla, Spain	Northeastern JC (NJCAA)
Karissa Antoine	11	Guard	5'11"	(redshirt) Sophomore	Pattersonville, NY	Fordham
Grace Sundback	23	Guard	5'9"	(redshirt) Junior	Staten Island, NY	Delaware

=== Recruiting class ===
There was no 2026 recruiting class.

== Roster ==
Years are listed according to the new NCAA age-based eligibility model.

2026–27 Siena Saints women's basketball team
Players
Coaches

Pos.	#	Name	Height	Year	Previous school	Hometown
G	0	Stella Ziogos	5 ft 4 in (1.63 m)	Fr	New Rochelle High School	New Rochelle, NY
G	2	Nila Giraud	6 ft 0 in (1.83 m)	Fr	Immaculate Conception High School; Albany	Rahway, NJ
G	3	Francesca Schiro	5 ft 7 in (1.7 m)	So	Hillsborough High School	Hillsborough, NJ
G	4	Dany Diaz	5 ft 4 in (1.63 m)	Fr	DeSoto High School	Coahuila, Mexico
G	7	Alazne Canales	5 ft 11 in (1.8 m)	Fr	Ointxe! Mondragon	Arrasate, Spain
G	8	Dani Garcia Gasco	6 ft 1 in (1.85 m)	Jr	Stenhus Gymnasium; Northeastern JC	Sevilla, Spain
G	9	Caydence Hadley	6 ft 1 in (1.85 m)	Sr	Bishop Kearney High School; Towson	Rochester, NY
G	10	Nicole Melious	5 ft 8 in (1.73 m)	RS Jr	Susan E. Wagner High School; Seton Hall	Staten Island, NY
G	11	Karissa Antoine	5 ft 11 in (1.8 m)	RS So	Schalmont High School; Seton Hall	Pattersonville, NY
G	12	Ashari Emuze	5 ft 5 in (1.65 m)	Fr	AZ Compass Prep	White Plains, NY
G	20	Kaiya Rain Tucker	6 ft 1 in (1.85 m)	So	Friends' Central School	Philadelphia, PA
G	21	Myanna Hatchette	5 ft 10 in (1.78 m)	Fr	Lake Highland Prep	Orlando, FL
G	23	Grace Sundback	5 ft 9 in (1.75 m)	RS Jr	Westtown School; Delaware	Staten Island, NY

Head coach

- Terry Primm (Palm Beach Atlantic)

Assistant coach(es)

- Chad Smith (Gonzaga)
- Erica Covile (Temple)
- Olivia Travis (Illinois–Springfield)

Legend

- (C) Team captain
- (S) Suspended
- (I) Ineligible
- (W) Walk-on
- Injured
- Current redshirt

Roster
Last update: September 9, 2026

== Schedule and results ==
Date time, TV	Rank^{#}	Opponent^{#}	Result	Record	High points	High rebounds	High assists	Site (attendance) city, state
Non-conference regular season
November 2, 2026*; 6:00 p.m., ESPN+		Brown	W 82–71	1–0	25 – Melious	11 – Tucker	4 – Tied	UHY Center (445); Loudonville, NY
November 5, 2026*; 6:00 p.m., ESPN+		at Maine; AE–Metro Challenge	L 68–70	1–1	18 – Melious	7 – Tied	3 – Tied	Memorial Gymnasium (1,063); Orono, ME
November 8, 2026*; 4:00 p.m., ESPN+		Binghamton; AE–Metro Challenge	L 73–79	1–2	30 – Schiro	8 – Hadley	4 – Tucker	MVP Arena (4,393); Albany, NY
November 11, 2026*; 6:00 p.m., ACCN		at Syracuse	L 58–82	1–3	16 – Schiro	8 – Tucker	3 – Tied	JMA Wireless Dome (2,713); Syracuse, NY
November 15, 2026*; 1:00 p.m., NEC Front Row		at New Haven	W 69–63 ^{OT}	2–3	25 – Schiro	14 – Tucker	3 – Tied	The Hazell Center (244); West Haven, CT
November 19, 2026*; 6:00 p.m., ESPN+		Army	L 41–54	2–4	14 – Tucker	7 – Tucker	2 – Tied	UHY Center (426); Loudonville, NY
November 21, 2026*; 5:00 p.m., NEC Front Row		at Mercyhurst	W 65–63	3–4	22 – Schiro	25 – Tucker	5 – Schiro	Owen McCormick Court (231); Erie, PA
November 24, 2026*; TBA		at Colgate						Cotterell Court; Hamilton, NY
November 30, 2026*; 6:00 p.m.		Cornell						UHY Center; Loudonville, NY
December 2, 2026*; TBA		at Dartmouth						Leede Arena; Hanover, NH
December 5, 2026*; 2:00 p.m.		Albany; Rivalry						UHY Center; Loudonville, NY
December 10, 2026*; 6:00 p.m.		Wagner						UHY Center; Loudonville, NY
Metro Conference regular season
December 19, 2026; TBA		at Merrimack						Lawler Arena; North Andover, MA
December 21, 2026; 11:00 a.m.		Quinnipiac						UHY Center; Loudonville, NY
December 29, 2026; 6:00 p.m.		Fairfield						UHY Center; Loudonville, NY
January 1, 2027; TBA		at Iona						Hynes Athletics Center; New Rochelle, NY
January 7, 2027; TBA		at Sacred Heart						William H. Pitt Center; Fairfield, CT
January 9, 2027*; 2:00 p.m.		Mount St. Mary's						UHY Center; Loudonville, NY
January 13, 2027; TBA		at Fairfield						Leo D. Mahoney Arena; Fairfield, CT
January 16, 2027; 2:00 p.m.		Saint Peter's						UHY Center; Loudonville, NY
January 18, 2027; TBA		at Manhattan						Draddy Gymnasium; Riverdale, NY
January 21, 2027; 6:00 p.m.		Niagara						UHY Center; Loudonville, NY
January 28, 2027; 6:30 p.m.		at Quinnipiac						M&T Bank Arena; Hamden, CT
January 30, 2027; 2:00 p.m.		Marist						UHY Center; Loudonville, NY
February 4, 2027; 11:00 a.m.		at Mount St. Mary's						Knott Arena; Emmitsburg, MD
February 6, 2027; 2:00 p.m.		Iona						UHY Center; Loudonville, NY
February 11, 2027; 6:00 p.m.		Merrimack						UHY Center; Loudonville, NY
February 13, 2027; 1:00 p.m.		at Canisius						Koessler Athletic Center; Buffalo, NY
February 18, 2027; 6:00 p.m.		at Rider						Canastra Hammer Arena; Lawrenceville, NJ
February 20, 2027; 2:00 p.m.		Sacred Heart						UHY Center; Loudonville, NY
February 25, 2027; 6:00 p.m.		Manhattan						UHY Center; Loudonville, NY
February 27, 2027; 7:00 p.m.		at Marist						McCann Arena; Poughkeepsie, NY
*Non-conference game. ^{#}Rankings from AP Poll. (#) Tournament seedings in parentheses. All times are in Eastern.
