= Ridgewood =

Ridgewood may refer to:

== Geography ==
=== Australia ===
- Ridgewood, Queensland
- Ridgewood, Western Australia

=== Canada ===
- Ridgewood, Ontario
- Ridgewood, Edmonton, Alberta

=== United Kingdom ===
- Ridgewood, East Sussex

=== United States ===
- Ridgewood Heights, California
- Ridgewood, Florida, in Putnam County
- Ridgewood, Clay County, Florida
- Ridgewood, Illinois, a CDP in Will County
- Ridgewood (Evanston, Illinois), a building
- Ridgewood, New Jersey
- Ridgewood, Queens, New York, a neighborhood in New York City
- Ridgewood, Niagara County, New York
- Ridgewood, Ohio

=== New Zealand ===
- Ridgewood, Taranaki, a suburb of New Plymouth in North Island, New Zealand

== Transportation ==
- Ridgewood (NJT station), the train station in Ridgewood, New Jersey; listed on the NRHP
- Ridgewood (LIRR Lower Montauk station), a closed station on the Lower Montauk line of the Long Island Rail Road (LIRR)
- Ridgewood, the original name for Wantagh (LIRR station)
- Ridgewood, the replacement name given to the former DeKalb Avenue station on the LIRR Evergreen Branch
- Ridgewood, the name of a LIRR station in Ridgewood, Queens
- Ridgewood, the previous name for Cypress Avenue/Dummy Crossing station on the LIRR Manhattan Beach/Bay Ridge Branch

== Other ==
- Ridgewood Park (baseball ground), a former baseball ground
- Ridgewood Preparatory School, a college preparatory school in New Orleans, Louisiana
- Ridgewood School, an academy in Scawsby, Doncaster, England

== See also ==
- Ridgewood High School (disambiguation)
