= 2026–27 Fairfield Stags women's basketball team =

American college basketball season

2026–27 Fairfield Stags women's basketball
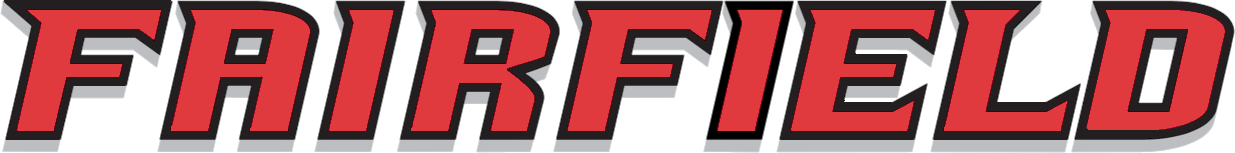
- Conference: Metro Atlantic Athletic Conference
- Record: 3–3 (0–0 Metro)
- Head coach: Carly Thibault-DuDonis (5th season)
- Associate head coach: Erika Brown
- Assistant coaches: Blake DuDonis; Jasmine Jenkins; Alex McKinnon
- Home arena: Leo D. Mahoney Arena

2026–27 Metro Conference women's basketball standings
	Conf.				Overall
Team	W		L	PCT	W		L	PCT
Fairfield	0	–	0	–	3	–	2	.600
Iona	0	–	0	–	3	–	3	.500
Manhattan	0	–	0	–	3	–	3	.500
Canisius	0	–	0	–	2	–	2	.500
Quinnipiac	0	–	0	–	3	–	4	.429
Rider	0	–	0	–	2	–	3	.400
Siena	0	–	0	–	2	–	4	.333
Saint Peter's	0	–	0	–	1	–	3	.250
Sacred Heart	0	–	0	–	1	–	4	.200
Marist	0	–	0	–	1	–	5	.167
Merrimack	0	–	0	–	0	–	6	.000
Mount St. Mary's	0	–	0	–	0	–	6	.000
Niagara	0	–	0	–	0	–	6	.000
† 2027 Metro Conference tournament winner As of November 22, 2026

The 2026–27 Fairfield Stags women's basketball team currently represents Fairfield University during the 2026–27 NCAA Division I women's basketball season. The Stags, led by fifth-year head coach Carly Thibault-DuDonis, play their home games at Leo D. Mahoney Arena in Fairfield, Connecticut and compete in their final season as a member of the newly renamed Metro Conference before their move to the Coastal Athletic Association in 2027.

== Previous season ==
The Stags finished the 2025–26 season 28–5 overall and 19–1 in MAAC play, both for the second straight season, to finish as regular season co-champions, sharing the title with Quinnipiac. Both teams' only regular season losses came from each other, with Fairfield losing to the Bobcats 58–72 at home in late January. For only the second time in program history, the Stags earned an AP Top 25 ranking, coming in at No. 25 on March 2.

As the two-time defending champions and the No. 2 seed in the MAAC tournament, they defeated No. 7 Sacred Heart and No. 3 Merrimack in the quarterfinals and semifinals respectively to once again advance to the finals. In a rematch of January's matchup, as well as last year's championship game, Fairfield defeated top-seeded Quinnipiac 51–44 to win their third consecutive conference title and capture the MAAC's automatic bid to the NCAA tournament.

In the NCAA tournament, the Stags were seeded No. 11 in the Fort Worth #1 Regional. They lost in the first round 60–79 to No. 6 Notre Dame to end their season.

== Offseason ==
=== Departures ===
Fairfield departures
Name	Number	Pos.	Height	Year	Hometown	Reason for departure
Selen Yusan	2	Forward	6'1"	Freshman	Istanbul, Turkey	Transferred to Chipola (NJCAA)
Janelle Brown	3	Guard	5'6"	Graduate Student	Middle Island, NY	Graduated
Lauren Beach	15	Forward	6'1"	Graduate Student	Medway, MA	Graduated
Alli Campbell	21	Guard	6'0"	Graduate Student	Altoona, PA	Graduated
Jalyn Sackrider	24	Forward	6'3"	Graduate Student	Elma, WA	Graduated
Sydni Scott	25	Guard	5'8"	Senior	Prospect Park, PA	Graduated
Christina Pham	30	Guard	5'7"	Freshman	Boston, MA	Transferred to Penn
Julia Karpell	31	Guard	5'11"	Sophomore	Holmdel, NJ	Transferred to Rider

=== Incoming transfers ===
Fairfield incoming transfers
Name	Number	Pos.	Height	Year	Hometown	Previous school
Paige Kohler	2	Guard	5'8"	Graduate Student	Olmsted Falls, OH	Bowling Green
Lana McCarthy	24	Forward/Center	6'4"	Senior	Bedford, NH	Purdue
Nia Green	55	Guard	6'0"	Junior	Columbia, MD	UNC Asheville

=== Recruiting class ===
There was no 2026 recruiting class.

== Roster ==
Years are listed according to the new NCAA age-based eligibility model.

2026–27 Fairfield Stags women's basketball team
Players
Coaches

Pos.	#	Name	Height	Year	Previous school	Hometown
G	0	Jillian Huerter	6 ft 0 in (1.83 m)	Sr	Shenendehowa High School; Rutgers	Clifton Park, NY
G	2	Paige Kohler	5 ft 8 in (1.73 m)	GS	Olmsted Falls High School; Bowling Green	Olmsted Falls, OH
G	3	Addison Rhodes	5 ft 11 in (1.8 m)	Fr	Crestview High School	Lisbon, OH
G	4	Kaety L'Amoreaux	5 ft 6 in (1.68 m)	GS	Maine-Endwell High School	Endwell, NY
F	5	Meghan Andersen	6 ft 1 in (1.85 m)	Sr	Our Lady of Mercy Academy	Wantagh, NY
G	7	Keyarah Gregory	5 ft 3 in (1.6 m)	RS So	Fort Erie International Academy	Pickering, Ontario
G	8	Emma Rogers	5 ft 10 in (1.78 m)	Fr	Aquinas College	Tauranga, New Zealand
F	10	Caterina Ravosa	6 ft 2 in (1.88 m)	Fr	Wilbraham and Monson Academy	East Longmeadow, MA
F	13	Cyanne Coe	6 ft 0 in (1.83 m)	Jr	Capital Courts Academy	Bolton, Ontario
G	22	Casey Prior	5 ft 7 in (1.7 m)	Sr	Red Bank Catholic High School	Sea Girt, NJ
G	23	Gabrielle Vaughn	6 ft 0 in (1.83 m)	Fr	The Shipley School	Glassboro, NJ
F/C	24	Lana McCarthy	6 ft 4 in (1.93 m)	Sr	Bedford High School; Purdue	Bedford, NH
F	32	Milou van Vliet	6 ft 0 in (1.83 m)	So	Orange Lions Academy	Barendrecht, Netherlands
G	55	Nia Green	6 ft 0 in (1.83 m)	Jr	Hammond High School; UNC Asheville	Columbia, MD

Head coach

- Carly Thibault-DuDonis (Monmouth)

Assistant coach(es)

- Erika Brown (Delaware)
- Blake DuDonis (Gardner–Webb)
- Jasmine Jenkins (Vanderbilt)
- Alex McKinnon (Montclair State)

Legend

- (C) Team captain
- (S) Suspended
- (I) Ineligible
- (W) Walk-on
- Injured
- Current redshirt

Roster
Last update: September 7, 2026

== Schedule and results ==
Date time, TV	Rank^{#}	Opponent^{#}	Result	Record	High points	High rebounds	High assists	Site (attendance) city, state
Exhibition
October 21, 2026*; 7:30 p.m.		New Haven	W 107–41		25 – Andersen	11 – Green	8 – L'Amoreaux	Leo D. Mahoney Arena (442); Fairfield, CT
Non-conference regular season
November 6, 2026*; 7:00 p.m., ESPN+		Binghamton; AE–Metro Challenge	W 90–63	1–0	23 – L'Amoreaux	4 – van Vliet	10 – L'Amoreaux	Leo D. Mahoney Arena (846); Fairfield, CT
November 8, 2026*; 2:00 p.m., ESPN+		Vermont; AE–Metro Challenge	W 74–50	2–0	18 – Coe	7 – McCarthy	8 – L'Amoreaux	Leo D. Mahoney Arena (749); Fairfield, CT
November 12, 2026*; 7:00 p.m., ESPN+		at Seton Hall	W 69–67	3–0	26 – L'Amoreaux	7 – McCarthy	3 – Kohler	Walsh Gymnasium (454); South Orange, NJ
November 15, 2026*; 2:00 p.m., ESPN+		Villanova	L 56–67	3–1	22 – L'Amoreaux	8 – Coe	4 – L'Amoreaux	Leo D. Mahoney Arena (1,706); Fairfield, CT
November 19, 2026*; 10:00 p.m., B1G+		at Oregon	L 75–96	3–2	17 – Andersen	6 – L'Amoreaux	9 – L'Amoreaux	Matthew Knight Arena (3,995); Eugene, OR
November 21, 2026*; 3:00 p.m., YouTube		at Oregon State	L 60–71	3–3	17 – L'Amoreaux	11 – L'Amoreaux	3 – Tied	Gill Coliseum (3,045); Corvallis, OR
November 26, 2026*; 3:30 p.m.		vs. North Dakota State; St. Pete's Showcase						McArthur Center; St. Petersburg, FL
November 27, 2026*; 2:30 p.m.		vs. BYU; St. Pete's Showcase						McArthur Center; St. Petersburg, FL
December 3, 2026*; TBA		at Lehigh						Stabler Arena; Bethlehem, PA
December 9, 2026*; TBA		vs. Maine						Portland Expo Center; Portland, ME
December 13, 2026*; 1:00 p.m.		Howard						Leo D. Mahoney Arena; Fairfield, CT
December 16, 2026*; 7:00 p.m.		Columbia						Leo D. Mahoney Arena; Fairfield, CT
Metro Conference regular season
December 19, 2026; TBA		at Manhattan						Draddy Gymnasium; Riverdale, NY
December 21, 2026; 7:00 p.m.		Merrimack						Leo D. Mahoney Arena; Fairfield, CT
December 29, 2026; 6:00 p.m.		at Siena						UHY Center; Loudonville, NY
January 1, 2027; 2:00 p.m.		Rider						Leo D. Mahoney Arena; Fairfield, CT
January 3, 2027; 2:00 p.m.		Iona						Leo D. Mahoney Arena; Fairfield, CT
January 9, 2027; TBA		at Merrimack						Lawler Arena; North Andover, MA
January 13, 2027; 11:00 a.m.		Siena						Leo D. Mahoney Arena; Fairfield, CT
January 16, 2027; 2:00 p.m.		Mount St. Mary's						Leo D. Mahoney Arena; Fairfield, CT
January 18, 2027; TBA		at Canisius						Koessler Athletic Center; Buffalo, NY
January 21, 2027; TBA		at Rider						Canastra Hammer Arena; Lawrenceville, NJ
January 23, 2027; 2:00 p.m.		Quinnipiac						Leo D. Mahoney Arena; Fairfield, CT
January 30, 2027; 2:00 p.m.		at Mount St. Mary's						Knott Arena; Emmitsburg, MD
February 4, 2027; 7:00 p.m.		Sacred Heart						Leo D. Mahoney Arena; Fairfield, CT
February 6, 2027; TBA		at Saint Peter's						Run Baby Run Arena; Jersey City, NJ
February 11, 2027; 7:00 p.m.		Marist						Leo D. Mahoney Arena; Fairfield, CT
February 13, 2027; TBA		at Quinnipiac						M&T Bank Arena; Hamden, CT
February 18, 2027; 7:00 p.m.		Canisius						Leo D. Mahoney Arena; Fairfield, CT
February 20, 2027; 2:00 p.m.		Niagara						Leo D. Mahoney Arena; Fairfield, CT
February 25, 2027; TBA		at Iona						Hynes Athletic Center; New Rochelle, NY
February 27, 2027; TBA		at Sacred Heart						William H. Pitt Center; Fairfield, CT
*Non-conference game. ^{#}Rankings from AP Poll. (#) Tournament seedings in parentheses. All times are in Eastern.
