= 2026–27 Sacred Heart Pioneers women's basketball team =

American college basketball season

2026–27 Sacred Heart Pioneers women's basketball
- Conference: Metro Conference
- Record: 1–4 (0–0 Metro)
- Head coach: Jessica Mannetti (14th season)
- Associate head coach: Marc Taney
- Assistant coaches: Jacinda Dunbar; Jen Peel; Nola Carter
- Home arena: William H. Pitt Center

2026–27 Metro Conference women's basketball standings
	Conf.				Overall
Team	W		L	PCT	W		L	PCT
Fairfield	0	–	0	–	3	–	2	.600
Iona	0	–	0	–	3	–	3	.500
Manhattan	0	–	0	–	3	–	3	.500
Canisius	0	–	0	–	2	–	2	.500
Quinnipiac	0	–	0	–	3	–	4	.429
Siena	0	–	0	–	2	–	4	.333
Rider	0	–	0	–	1	–	3	.250
Saint Peter's	0	–	0	–	1	–	3	.250
Sacred Heart	0	–	0	–	1	–	4	.200
Marist	0	–	0	–	1	–	5	.167
Merrimack	0	–	0	–	0	–	6	.000
Mount St. Mary's	0	–	0	–	0	–	6	.000
Niagara	0	–	0	–	0	–	6	.000
† 2027 Metro Conference tournament winner As of November 20, 2026

The 2026–27 Sacred Heart Pioneers women's basketball team currently represents Sacred Heart University during the 2026–27 NCAA Division I women's basketball season. The Pioneers, led by fourteenth-year head coach Jessica Mannetti, play their home games at the William H. Pitt Center in Fairfield, Connecticut, and compete as a member of the newly renamed Metro Conference.

== Previous season ==
The Pioneers finished the 2025–26 season 13–18 overall and 10–10 in MAAC play, finishing in a tie for seventh place in the conference with Manhattan. As the No. 8 seed in the MAAC tournament, they defeated No. 10 Saint Peter's in the first round before falling in the quarterfinals to No. 2 Fairfield.

== Offseason ==
=== Departures ===
Sacred Heart departures
Name	Number	Pos.	Height	Year	Hometown	Reason for departure
Taaliyah Porter	3	Guard	5'9"	Freshman	Rapid City, SD	Transferred to Eastern Florida State College (NJCAA)
Grace John	5	Guard	5'5"	Senior	Bayelsa, Nigeria	Graduated
Esther Kursite	14	Center	6'2"	Sophomore	London, England	Transferred to South Alabama
Faith Pappas	23	Guard	5'11"	Senior	Long Valley, NJ	Graduated
Sierra Johnson	24	Guard	5'8"	Senior	Richmond, VA	Graduated
Amelia Wood	33	Guard	6'0"	Senior	Wynantskill, NY	Graduated
Dianne Crespo López	44	Guard	5'10"	Sophomore	Río Grande, Puerto Rico	Transferred to UPR-Bayamón (D-II)

=== Incoming transfers ===
Sacred Heart incoming transfers
Name	Number	Pos.	Height	Year	Hometown	Previous school
Angelina Hodgens	1	Guard	5'10"	Sophomore	Staten Island, NY	Northwestern
Oralye Kiefer	12	Forward	6'3"	Graduate Student	Wayland, MA	Merrimack
Katie Ledden	15	Guard/Forward	6'0"	Senior	Clark, NJ	New Hampshire
Mercedes Artaiz	44	Guard	5'8"	Sophomore	Durham, CT	Wilkes (D-III)

=== Recruiting class ===
There was no 2026 recruiting class.

== Roster ==
2026–27 Sacred Heart Pioneers women's basketball team
Players
Coaches

Pos.	#	Name	Height	Year	Previous school	Hometown
G	0	Montana Nicks	5 ft 6 in (1.68 m)	Sr	Dwight-Englewood School	Englewood, NJ
G	1	Angelina Hodgens	5 ft 10 in (1.78 m)	So	St. Joseph by the Sea High School; Northwestern	Staten Island, NY
G	2	Sophie Nascimento	5 ft 8 in (1.73 m)	So	The Ursuline School	Scarsdale, NY
F	4	Nalyce Dudley	5 ft 11 in (1.8 m)	Sr	New London High School	Norwich, CT
G	8	Taia McMechan	5 ft 7 in (1.7 m)	Fr	Rowville Secondary College	Victoria, Australia
G	9	Missy Nuku	5 ft 6 in (1.68 m)	Sr	Lakeland College	Tauranga, New Zealand
C	10	Emma Kirby	6 ft 2 in (1.88 m)	Sr	Tatnall School	Chadds Ford, PA
F	12	Oralye Kiefer	6 ft 3 in (1.91 m)	GS	Beaver Country Day School; Merrimack	Wayland, MA
C	14	Alexia Lauzon	6 ft 3 in (1.91 m)	Fr	Capital Court Academy	Drummondville, Quebec
G/F	15	Katie Ledden	6 ft 0 in (1.83 m)	Sr	Rutgers Prep; New Hampshire	Clark, NJ
G	20	Kristen Phelan	5 ft 8 in (1.73 m)	So	Tappan Zee High School	Tappan, NY
G	21	Selah Prignano	5 ft 11 in (1.8 m)	Fr	Wilbraham & Monson Academy	Newington, CT
G	30	Jordanna Schrecker	5 ft 8 in (1.73 m)	So	New Dorp High School	Staten Island, NY
G	44	Mercedes Artaiz	5 ft 8 in (1.73 m)	So	Mercy High School; Wilkes	Durham, CT

Head coach

- Jessica Mannetti (Concordia (NY))

Assistant coach(es)

- Marc Taney (Springfield)
- Jacinda Dunbar (Quinnipiac)
- Jen Peel (Saint Anselm)
- Nola Carter (Fort Valley State)

Legend

- (C) Team captain
- (S) Suspended
- (I) Ineligible
- (W) Walk-on
- Injured
- Current redshirt

Roster
Last update: September 12, 2026

== Schedule and results ==
Date time, TV	Rank^{#}	Opponent^{#}	Result	Record	High points	High rebounds	High assists	Site (attendance) city, state
Non-conference regular season
November 3, 2026*; 6:00 p.m., ACCNX		at Syracuse	L 48–75	0–1	14 – Nascimento	6 – Tied	2 – Nascimento	JMA Wireless Dome; Syracuse, NY
November 6, 2026*; 7:00 p.m., ESPN+		Mercy	W 71–47	1–1	19 – Nascimento	10 – Tied	3 – Nascimento	William H. Pitt Center (493); Fairfield, CT
November 11, 2026*; 7:00 p.m., ESPN+		Northeastern	L 46–61	1–2	10 – Dudley	4 – Tied	6 – Nascimento	William H. Pitt Center (907); Fairfield, CT
November 15, 2026*; 1:00 p.m., FloCollege		at Stony Brook	L 34–44	1–3	8 – Tied	10 – Hodgens	4 – Nascimento	Stony Brook Arena (327); Stony Brook, NY
November 19, 2026*; 6:30 p.m., B1G+		at Michigan State	L 49–78	1–4	14 – Dudley	8 – Kirby	5 – Nascimento	Breslin Center (2,789); East Lansing, MI
November 21, 2026*; TBA		at Detroit Mercy						Calihan Hall; Detroit, MI
November 24, 2026*; TBA		at New Haven						The Hazell Center; West Haven, CT
November 30, 2026*; TBA		Holy Cross						William H. Pitt Center; Fairfield, CT
December 3, 2026*; TBA		Central Connecticut						William H. Pitt Center; Fairfield, CT
December 6, 2026*; TBA		at Pittsburgh						Petersen Events Center; Pittsburgh, PA
December 13, 2026*; TBA		at NJIT						Wellness and Events Center; Newark, NJ
Non-conference regular season
December 19, 2026; TBA		Marist						William H. Pitt Center; Fairfield, CT
December 21, 2026; TBA		Saint Peter's						William H. Pitt Center; Fairfield, CT
January 1, 2027; TBA		at Niagara						Gallagher Center; Lewiston, NY
January 3, 2027; TBA		at Canisius						Koessler Athletic Center; Buffalo, NY
January 7, 2027; TBA		Siena						William H. Pitt Center; Fairfield, CT
January 9, 2027; TBA		at Manhattan						Draddy Gymnasium; Riverdale, NY
January 13, 2027; TBA		at Mount St. Mary's						Knott Arena; Emmitsburg, MD
January 16, 2027; TBA		Iona						William H. Pitt Center; Fairfield, CT
January 18, 2027; TBA		at Quinnipiac						M&T Bank Arena; Hamden, CT
January 21, 2027; TBA		Canisius						William H. Pitt Center; Fairfield, CT
January 23, 2027; TBA		at Marist						McCann Arena; Poughkeepsie, NY
January 28, 2027; TBA		Rider						William H. Pitt Center; Fairfield, CT
January 30, 2027; TBA		at Iona						Hynes Athletic Center; New Rochelle, NY
February 4, 2027; TBA		at Fairfield						Leo D. Mahoney Arena; Fairfield, CT
February 6, 2027; TBA		Manhattan						William H. Pitt Center; Fairfield, CT
February 13, 2027; TBA		Mount St. Mary's						William H. Pitt Center; Fairfield, CT
February 18, 2027; TBA		at Saint Peter's						Run Baby Run Arena; Jersey City, NJ
February 20, 2027; TBA		at Siena						UHY Center; Loudonville, NY
February 25, 2027; TBA		Merrimack						William H. Pitt Center; Fairfield, CT
February 27, 2027; TBA		Fairfield						William H. Pitt Center; Fairfield, CT
*Non-conference game. ^{#}Rankings from AP Poll. (#) Tournament seedings in parentheses. All times are in Eastern.
