= 2026–27 Canisius Golden Griffins women's basketball team =

American college basketball season

2026–27 Canisius Golden Griffins women's basketball
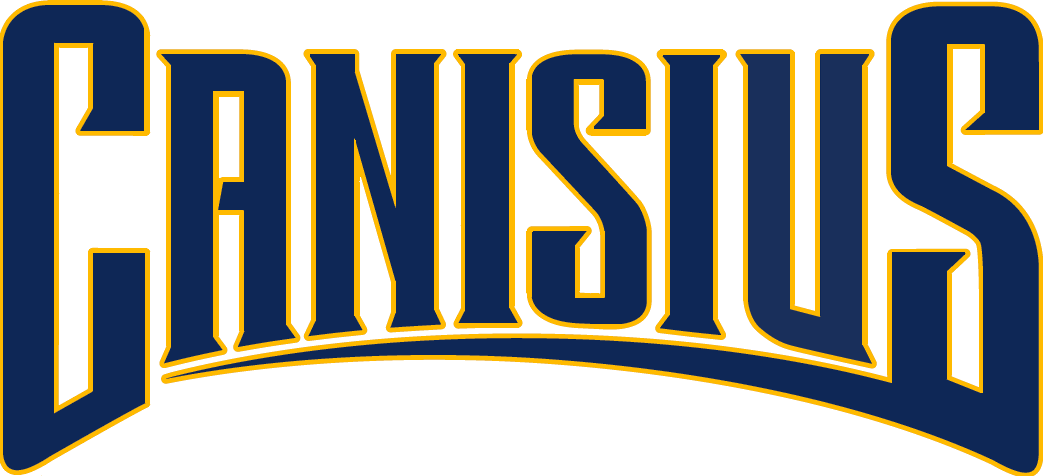
- Conference: Metro Conference
- Record: 2–1 (0–0 Metro)
- Head coach: Tiffany Swoffard (3rd season)
- Assistant coaches: Lindsay Hieronymus; Courtney Roman; Mikaela Boyd
- Home arena: Koessler Athletic Center

2026–27 Metro Conference women's basketball standings
	Conf.				Overall
Team	W		L	PCT	W		L	PCT
Fairfield	0	–	0	–	3	–	0	1.000
Canisius	0	–	0	–	2	–	0	1.000
Rider	0	–	0	–	1	–	1	.500
Sacred Heart	0	–	0	–	1	–	2	.333
Iona	0	–	0	–	1	–	3	.250
Manhattan	0	–	0	–	1	–	3	.250
Quinnipiac	0	–	0	–	1	–	3	.250
Siena	0	–	0	–	1	–	3	.250
Saint Peter's	0	–	0	–	0	–	3	.000
Marist	0	–	0	–	0	–	4	.000
Merrimack	0	–	0	–	0	–	4	.000
Mount St. Mary's	0	–	0	–	0	–	4	.000
Niagara	0	–	0	–	0	–	4	.000
† 2027 Metro Conference tournament winner As of November 14, 2026

The 2026–27 Canisius Golden Griffins women's basketball team currently represents Canisius University during the 2026–27 NCAA Division I women's basketball season. The Golden Griffins, led by third-year head coach Tiffany Swoffard, play their home games at the Koessler Athletic Center in Buffalo, New York, and compete as a member of the newly renamed Metro Conference.

== Previous season ==
The Golden Griffins finished the 2025–26 season 5–24 overall and 3–17 in MAAC play, to finish in twelfth place in the conference. They failed to qualify for the MAAC tournament.

== Offseason ==
=== Departures ===
Canisius departures
Name	Number	Pos.	Height	Year	Hometown	Reason for departure
Irene Rey Pineda	5	Forward	5'10"	Sophomore	Madrid, Spain	Transferred to Stony Brook
Antionique Austin	11	Guard	5'9"	Junior	Sun Prairie, WI	Entered transfer portal
Ileana Feliz	15	Forward	6'1"	Sophomore	New Milford, CT	Entered transfer portal
Evie van der Woude	21	Center	6'5"	Junior	Zwolle, Netherlands	Graduated
Franka Wittenburg	22	Guard	5'8"	Senior	Hildesheim, Germany	Graduated

=== Incoming transfers ===
Canisius incoming transfers
Name	Number	Pos.	Height	Year	Hometown	Previous school
Sofia Vitucci	5	Guard	5'7"	Junior	Yardley, PA	Harcum College (NJCAA)
Maria Sánchez Pitarch	11	Guard	5'8"	Junior	Valencia, Spain	Northeastern
Suzanne Wembadjonga	22	Forward	6'4"	Junior	Libreville, Gabon	Northeastern Oklahoma A&M College (NJCAA)

=== Recruiting class ===
There was no 2026 recruiting class.

== Roster ==
Years are listed according to the new NCAA age-based eligibility model.

2026–27 Canisius Golden Griffins women's basketball team
Players
Coaches

Pos.	#	Name	Height	Year	Previous school	Hometown
G	0	Jania Akins	5 ft 10 in (1.78 m)	RS Fr	Norcross High School; Mercer	Chicago, IL
G	1	Ari Parker	5 ft 10 in (1.78 m)	So	Cass Technical High School	Detroit, MI
G	3	Mary Copple	5 ft 7 in (1.7 m)	Sr	Brighton High School	Brighton, MI
G	4	Corniya Clay	5 ft 5 in (1.65 m)	Jr	Central Catholic High School	Toledo, OH
G	5	Sofia Vitucci	5 ft 7 in (1.7 m)	Jr	Pennsbury High School; Harcum College	Yardley, PA
G	8	Molly Mescall	5 ft 8 in (1.73 m)	So	Iroquois High School	Elma, NY
G	10	Kelsey Bess	5 ft 10 in (1.78 m)	Sr	William Penn Charter School; Harcum College	Philadelphia, PA
G	11	Maria Sánchez Pitarch	5 ft 8 in (1.73 m)	Jr	Cambridge House International School; Northeastern	Valencia, Spain
G	12	Saige Randolph	5 ft 5 in (1.65 m)	Sr	Albany Academy for Girls	Albany, NY
F	20	Aubrey Hupp	5 ft 11 in (1.8 m)	Fr	Blackhawk High School	Beaver Falls, PA
F	22	Suzanne Wembadjonga	6 ft 4 in (1.93 m)	Jr	Lycee Techinque Jean Fidele Otondo; Northeastern Oklahoma A&M College	Libreville, Gabon
F	23	Yasmine Djibril	6 ft 1 in (1.85 m)	Jr	Collège Montmorency	Montreal, Quebec
G	24	Celena Grant	5 ft 9 in (1.75 m)	Fr	North Augusta High School	North Augusta, SC
F	34	Shariah Gailes	6 ft 0 in (1.83 m)	Sr	Brooklyn High School; Illinois–Springfield	Brooklyn, OH
G	44	Alex Moses	5 ft 9 in (1.75 m)	Jr	Duanesburg High School	Delanson, NY

Head coach

- Tiffany Swoffard (Austin Peay)

Assistant coach(es)

- Lindsay Hieronymus (Transylvania)
- Courtney Roman (Penn State)
- Mikaela Boyd (Toledo)

Legend

- (C) Team captain
- (S) Suspended
- (I) Ineligible
- (W) Walk-on
- Injured
- Current redshirt

Roster
Last update: September 10, 2026

== Schedule and results ==
Date time, TV	Rank^{#}	Opponent^{#}	Result	Record	High points	High rebounds	High assists	Site (attendance) city, state
Non-conference regular season
November 5, 2026*; 12:00 p.m., ESPN+		at New Hampshire; AE–Metro Challenge	W 52–48	1–0	16 – Gailes	11 – Hupp	2 – Tied	Lundholm Gymnasium (258); Durham, NH
November 8, 2026*; 12:00 p.m., ESPN+		UMass Lowell; AE–Metro Challenge	W 73–61	2–0	26 – Vitucci	7 – Hupp	3 – Vitucci	Koessler Athletic Center (505); Buffalo, NY
November 13, 2026*; 5:00 p.m., ESPN+		at Cornell	L 61–64	2–1	11 – Sánchez Pitarch	10 – Gailes	2 – Tied	Newman Arena (327); Ithaca, NY
November 15, 2026*; 7:00 p.m., ACCN		at Syracuse						JMA Wireless Dome; Syracuse, NY
November 21, 2026*; 2:00 p.m., ACCNX		at Pittsburgh						Petersen Events Center; Pittsburgh, PA
November 23, 2026*; 6:00 p.m., ESPN+		at Duquesne						UPMC Cooper Fieldhouse; Pittsburgh, PA
November 25, 2026*; 1:00 p.m., NEC Front Row		at Mercyhurst						Owen McCormick Court; Erie, PA
November 29, 2026*; 1:00 p.m., ESPN+		St. Bonaventure						Koessler Athletic Center; Buffalo, NY
December 2, 2026*; 6:00 p.m., ESPN+		Buffalo						Koessler Athletic Center; Buffalo, NY
December 6, 2026*; 1:00 p.m., ESPN+		at Eastern Michigan						George Gervin GameAbove Center; Ypsilanti, MI
December 13, 2026*; 1:00 p.m., B1G+		at Ohio State						Schlottenstein Center; Columbus, OH
December 15, 2026*; 11:00 a.m., ESPN+		at Wright State						Nutter Center; Dayton, OH
Metro Conference regular season
December 19, 2026; 2:00 p.m., ESPN+		at Rider						Canastra Hammer Arena; Lawrenceville, NJ
December 21, 2026; 1:00 p.m., ESPN+		at Mount St. Mary's						Knott Arena; Emmitsburg, MD
January 1, 2027; 1:00 p.m., ESPN+		Marist						Koessler Athletic Center; Buffalo, NY
January 3, 2027; 1:00 p.m., ESPN+		Sacred Heart						Koessler Athletic Center; Buffalo, NY
January 7, 2027; 6:00 p.m., ESPN+		at Saint Peter's						Run Baby Run Arena; Jersey City, NJ
January 9, 2027; 1:00 p.m., ESPN+		at Iona						Hynes Athletic Center; New Rochelle, NY
January 16, 2027; 1:00 p.m., ESPN+		Merrimack						Koessler Athletic Center; Buffalo, NY
January 18, 2027; 1:00 p.m., ESPN+		Fairfield						Koessler Athletic Center; Buffalo, NY
January 21, 2027; 7:00 p.m., ESPN+		at Sacred Heart						William H. Pitt Center; Fairfield, CT
January 23, 2027; 1:00 p.m., ESPN+		Niagara						Koessler Athletic Center; Buffalo, NY
January 28, 2027; 11:00 a.m., ESPN+		Saint Peter's						Koessler Athletic Center; Buffalo, NY
January 30, 2027; 1:00 p.m., ESPN+		Manhattan						Koessler Athletic Center; Buffalo, NY
February 4, 2027; 6:30 p.m., ESPN+		at Quinnipiac						M&T Bank Arena; Hamden, CT
February 6, 2027; 7:00 p.m., ESPN+		at Marist						McCann Arena; Poughkeepsie, NY
February 11, 2027; 6:00 p.m., ESPN+		at Niagara						Gallagher Center; Lewiston, NY
February 13, 2027; 1:00 p.m., ESPN+		Siena						Koessler Athletic Center; Buffalo, NY
February 18, 2027; 7:00 p.m., ESPN+		at Fairfield						Leo D. Mahoney Arena; Fairfield, CT
February 20, 2027; 1:00 p.m., ESPN+		at Merrimack						Lawler Arena; North Andover, MA
February 25, 2027; 6:00 p.m., ESPN+		Mount St. Mary's						Koessler Athletic Center; Buffalo, NY
February 27, 2027; 1:00 p.m., ESPN+		Rider						Koessler Athletic Center; Buffalo, NY
*Non-conference game. ^{#}Rankings from AP Poll. (#) Tournament seedings in parentheses. All times are in Eastern.
