= 2026–27 Manhattan Jaspers women's basketball team =

American college basketball season

2026–27 Manhattan Jaspers women's basketball
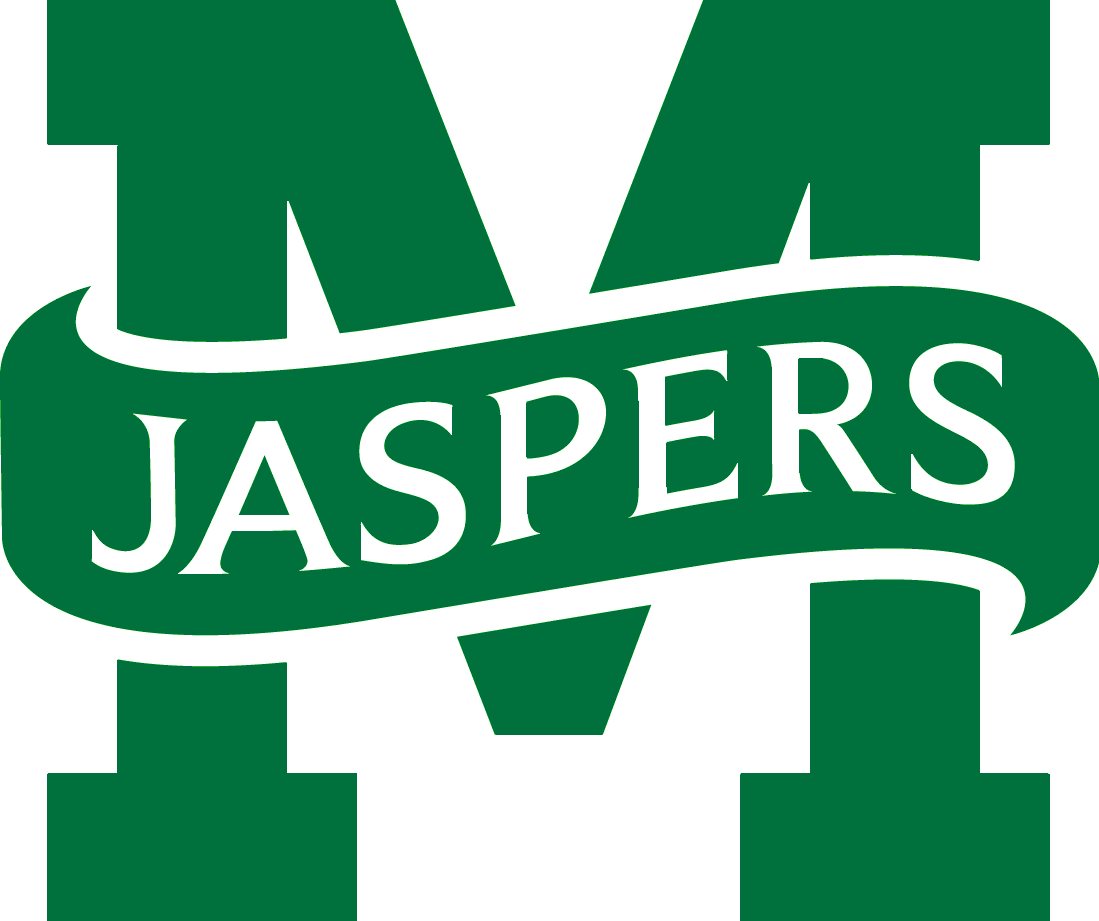
- Conference: Metro Conference
- Record: 0–0 (0–0 Metro)
- Head coach: Heather Vulin (11th season)
- Associate head coach: Callan Stores
- Assistant coaches: DeeDee Davis; Abby Streeter
- Home arena: Draddy Gymnasium

2026–27 Metro Conference women's basketball standings
	Conf.				Overall
Team	W		L	PCT	W		L	PCT
Canisius	0	–	0	–	0	–	0	–
Fairfield	0	–	0	–	0	–	0	–
Iona	0	–	0	–	0	–	0	–
Manhattan	0	–	0	–	0	–	0	–
Marist	0	–	0	–	0	–	0	–
Merrimack	0	–	0	–	0	–	0	–
Mount St. Mary's	0	–	0	–	0	–	0	–
Niagara	0	–	0	–	0	–	0	–
Quinnipiac	0	–	0	–	0	–	0	–
Rider	0	–	0	–	0	–	0	–
Sacred Heart	0	–	0	–	0	–	0	–
Saint Peter's	0	–	0	–	0	–	0	–
Siena	0	–	0	–	0	–	0	–
† 2027 Metro Conference tournament winner

The 2026–27 Manhattan Jaspers women's basketball team will represent Manhattan University during the 2026–27 NCAA Division I women's basketball season. The Jaspers, led by eleventh-year head coach Heather Vulin, will play their home games at Draddy Gymnasium in Riverdale, New York, and compete as a member of the newly renamed Metro Conference.

== Previous season ==
The Jaspers finished the 2025–26 season 11–20 overall and 10–10 in MAAC play, finishing in a tie for seventh in the conference with Sacred Heart. As the No. 8 seed in the MAAC tournament, they defeated No. 9 Marist in the first round before falling 43–59 in the quarterfinals to top-seeded Quinnipiac to end their season.

== Offseason ==
=== Departures ===
Manhattan departures
Name	Number	Pos.	Height	Year	Hometown	Reason for departure
Brianna Davis	0	Guard	5'8"	Senior	The Bronx, NY	Graduated
Hana Mühl	1	Guard	5'8"	Senior	Zagreb, Croatia	Graduated
Tatianna Collins	3	Forward	5'10"	Freshman	Roselle, NJ	TBD; entered transfer portal
Johlana Tatum	4	Guard	5'8"	Freshman	Brooklyn, NY	Transferred to Grambling State
Autumn Taylor	7	Guard	5'7"	Junior	Twinsburg, OH	Transferred to Winthrop
Elisa Solé Sanchez	9	Guard	5'8"	Graduate Student	Sant Andreu de Llavaneres, Spain	Graduated
Alyssa Costigan	10	Guard	6'0"	(redshirt) Junior	Herndon, VA	Transferred to Florida Southern (D-II)
Agar Farrés Garcia	22	Forward	5'11"	Graduate Student	Barcelona, Spain	Graduated
Meghan Thompson	33	Guard	5'8"	Freshman	Colchester, VA	TBD; not listed on roster
Colette Mulderig	44	Forward	6'4"	Graduate Student	Scranton, PA	Graduated

=== Incoming transfers ===
Manhattan incoming transfers
Name	Number	Pos.	Height	Year	Hometown	Previous school
Olivia Grgicevich Lassey	1	Guard	5'11"	Junior	Mount Maunganui, New Zealand	Collin College (NJCAA)
Ruzgar Christina Boyle	3	Guard	5'9"	Senior	Istanbul, Turkey	American International (D-II)
Jaelyn Choi	4	Guard	5'7"	(redshirt) Sophomore	Osseo, MN	Bridgeport (D-II)
Taylah Murtagh	7	Guard	5'9"	Junior	Traralgon, Australia	Williston State College (NJCAA)
Anna Zesati	20	Forward	6'2"	Sophomore	Monterrey, Mexico	Lamar CC (NJCAA)
Amanda Baumgarte	23	Forward	6'1"	Junior	Riga, Latvia	Western Wyoming College (NJCAA)
Laura Ring	24	Forward	6'1"	Junior	Dunedin, New Zealand	Central Wyoming College (NJCAA)
Laia Izquierdo Altimira	52	Forward	5'11"	Junior	Barcelona, Spain	McCook CC (NJCAA)

=== Recruiting class ===
There was no 2026 recruiting class.

== Roster ==
2026–27 Manhattan Jaspers women's basketball team
Players
Coaches

Pos.	#	Name	Height	Year	Previous school	Hometown
G	0	Bleu Kerr	5 ft 9 in (1.75 m)	Fr	St. Mark's School	Boston, MA
G	1	Olivia Grgicevich Lassey	5 ft 11 in (1.8 m)	Jr	Mount Maunganui College; Collin College	Mount Maunganui, New Zealand
F	2	Cortney Howell	6 ft 2 in (1.88 m)	Fr	St. Mark's School	Boston, MA
G	3	Ruzgar Christina Boyle	5 ft 9 in (1.75 m)	Sr	Layton Christian Academy; American International	Istanbul, Turkey
G	4	Jaelyn Choi	5 ft 7 in (1.7 m)	RS So	Osseo Senior High School; Bridgeport	Osseo, MN
G	5	Celeste Harper	5 ft 8 in (1.73 m)	So	Kent School	Englewood, NJ
F	6	Kristina Juric	6 ft 2 in (1.88 m)	RS Jr	Kušlanova Gymnasium	Zagreb, Croatia
G	7	Taylah Murtagh	5 ft 9 in (1.75 m)	Jr	Layton Christian Academy; American International	Traralgon, Australia
G	8	Nisan Sel	5 ft 8 in (1.73 m)	Fr	TED Ankara College	Ankara, Turkey
G	10	Kennedy Brown	5 ft 8 in (1.73 m)	Fr	Morris Catholic High School	Jefferson, NJ
G	13	Ella Chandler	6 ft 0 in (1.83 m)	RS So	Wilbraham & Monson Academy	Ballston Lake, NY
F	20	Ana Zesati	6 ft 2 in (1.88 m)	Jr	Royal Hollow Academy; Lamar CC	Monterrey, Mexico
F	23	Amanda Baumgarte	6 ft 1 in (1.85 m)	Jr	Riga Jimanta Secondary School; Western Wyoming College	Riga, Latvia
F	24	Laura Ring	6 ft 1 in (1.85 m)	Jr	St. Hilda's Collegiate School; Central Wyoming College	Dunedin, New Zealand
F	52	Laia Izquierdo Altimira	5 ft 11 in (1.8 m)	Jr	Col•legi SAFA Sant Andreu; McCook CC	Barcelona, Spain

Head coach

- Heather Vulin (Minnesota Morris)

Assistant coach(es)

- Callan Stores (Sacred Heart)
- DeeDee Davis (Manhattan)
- Abby Streeter (Rutgers)

Legend

- (C) Team captain
- (S) Suspended
- (I) Ineligible
- (W) Walk-on
- Injured
- Current redshirt

Roster
Last update: September 13, 2026

== Schedule and results ==
Date time, TV	Rank^{#}	Opponent^{#}	Result	Record	High points	High rebounds	High assists	Site (attendance) city, state
Non-conference regular season
November 2, 2026*; TBA		Pace						Draddy Gymnasium; Riverdale, NY
November 5, 2026*; TBA		at Albany; AE–Metro Challenge						SEFCU Arena; Albany, NY
November 8, 2026*; TBA		Bryant; AE–Metro Challenge						Draddy Gymnasium; Riverdale, NY
November 12, 2026*; TBA		at Fairleigh Dickinson						Bogota Savings Bank Center; Hackensack, NJ
November 15, 2026*; TBA		Fordham; Battle of the Bronx						Draddy Gymnasium; Riverdale, NY
November 19, 2026*; TBA		at LIU						Steinberg Wellness Center; Brooklyn, NY
November 27, 2026*; TBA		vs. Northern Illinois; FIU Thanksgiving Classic						Ocean Bank Convocation Center; Miami, FL
November 29, 2026*; TBA		vs. FIU or North Dakota; FIU Thanksgiving Classic						Ocean Bank Convocation Center; Miami, FL
December 2, 2026*; 11:00 a.m.		Le Moyne						Draddy Gymnasium; Riverdale, NY
December 5, 2026*; TBA		NJIT						Draddy Gymnasium; Riverdale, NY
December 15, 2026*; TBA		Central Connecticut						Draddy Gymnasium; Riverdale, NY
Metro Conference regular season
December 19, 2026*; 6:00 p.m.		Fairfield						Draddy Gymnasium; Riverdale, NY
December 29, 2026*; 6:00 p.m.		at Saint Peter's						Run Baby Run Arena; Jersey City, NJ
January 1, 2027; TBA		at Merrimack						Lawler Arena; North Andover, MA
January 3, 2027*; 6:00 p.m.		Mount St. Mary's						Draddy Gymnasium; Riverdale, NY
January 7, 2027; TBA		at Quinnipiac						M&T Bank Arena; Hamden, CT
January 9, 2027; 6:00 p.m.		Sacred Heart						Draddy Gymnasium; Riverdale, NY
January 13, 2027; TBA		Marist						Draddy Gymnasium; Riverdale, NY
January 16, 2027; TBA		at Rider						Canastra Hammer Arena; Lawrenceville, NJ
January 18, 2027; 6:00 p.m.		Siena						Draddy Gymnasium; Riverdale, NY
January 21, 2027; 7:00 p.m.		at Mount St. Mary's						Knott Arena; Emmitsburg, MD
January 23, 2027; 6:00 p.m.		Merrimack						Draddy Gymnasium; Riverdale, NY
January 28, 2027; TBA		at Niagara						Gallagher Center; Lewiston, NY
January 30, 2027; 1:00 p.m.		at Canisius						Koessler Athletic Center; Buffalo, NY
February 4, 2027; TBA		Iona						Draddy Gymnasium; Riverdale, NY
February 6, 2027; TBA		at Sacred Heart						William H. Pitt Center; Fairfield, CT
February 11, 2027; TBA		Quinnipiac						Draddy Gymnasium; Riverdale, NY
February 13, 2027; TBA		Rider						Draddy Gymnasium; Riverdale, NY
February 18, 2027; TBA		at Iona						Hynes Athletic Center; New Rochelle, NY
February 20, 2027; TBA		Saint Peter's						Draddy Gymnasium; Riverdale, NY
February 21, 2027; 6:00 p.m.		at Siena						UHY Center; Loudonville, NY
*Non-conference game. ^{#}Rankings from AP Poll. (#) Tournament seedings in parentheses. All times are in Eastern.
