= 2026–27 Saint Peter's Peacocks women's basketball team =

American college basketball season

2026–27 Saint Peter's Peacocks women's basketball
- Conference: Metro Conference
- Record: 0–0 (0–0 Metro)
- Head coach: Jennifer Leedham (5th season)
- Associate head coach: David Jollon
- Assistant coaches: Johannah Leedham-Warner; Tay Hughes
- Home arena: Run Baby Run Arena

2026–27 Metro Conference women's basketball standings
	Conf.				Overall
Team	W		L	PCT	W		L	PCT
Canisius	0	–	0	–	0	–	0	–
Fairfield	0	–	0	–	0	–	0	–
Iona	0	–	0	–	0	–	0	–
Manhattan	0	–	0	–	0	–	0	–
Marist	0	–	0	–	0	–	0	–
Merrimack	0	–	0	–	0	–	0	–
Mount St. Mary's	0	–	0	–	0	–	0	–
Niagara	0	–	0	–	0	–	0	–
Quinnipiac	0	–	0	–	0	–	0	–
Rider	0	–	0	–	0	–	0	–
Sacred Heart	0	–	0	–	0	–	0	–
Saint Peter's	0	–	0	–	0	–	0	–
Siena	0	–	0	–	0	–	0	–
† 2027 Metro Conference tournament winner

The 2026–27 Saint Peter's Peacocks women's basketball team will represent Saint Peter's University during the 2026–27 NCAA Division I women's basketball season. The Peacocks, led by fifth-year head coach Jennifer Leedham, played their home games at the Run Baby Run Arena in Jersey City, New Jersey, and compete as a member of the newly renamed Metro Conference.

== Previous season ==
The Pioneers finished the 2025–26 season 7–23 overall and 6–14 in MAAC play, finishing tenth in the conference. As the No. 10 seed in the MAAC tournament, they lost in the first round to No. 7 Sacred Heart 34–47 to end their season.

== Offseason ==
=== Departures ===
Saint Peter's departures
Name	Number	Pos.	Height	Year	Hometown	Reason for departure
Laila Grant	0	Guard/Forward	5'8"	Graduate Student	Derwood, MD	Graduated
Louella Allana	3	Guard	5'4"	Senior	Laval, Quebec	Graduated
Jayshylnn Vega	4	Guard	5'5"	Freshman	Florida, Puerto Rico	TBD; not listed on roster
Jineen Ayyash	7	Guard/Forward	5'10"	Sophomore	Ocean, NJ	Transferred to Lock Haven (D-II)
De'Naya Rippey	13	Forward	5'10"	Sophomore	Brooklyn, NY	Transferred to Duquesne
Layla Laws	15	Forward	6'1"	Graduate Student	Pine Beach, NJ	Entered transfer portal
Reilly Sunday	20	Guard	5'9"	Senior	Moon Township, PA	Graduated, transferred to Queens College (D-II)

=== Incoming transfers ===
Saint Peter's incoming transfers
Name	Number	Pos.	Height	Year	Hometown	Previous school
Ebere Egbirika	0	Guard	5'7"	Senior	London, England	Stony Brook
Aniyah Neal	4	Guard/Forward	5'11"	Sophomore	Syracuse, NY	Quinnipiac
Ineivi Plata	5	Guard	5'3"	Junior	White Plains, NY	Florida Atlantic
Bree Riley	11	Guard	5'6"	Sophomore	Spring, TX	Abilene Christian
Lamaria Estridge	32	Forward	5'11"	Junior	Walkersville, MD	Shepherd (D-II)

=== Recruiting class ===
There was no 2026 recruiting class.

== Roster ==
2026–27 Saint Peter's Peacocks women's basketball team
Players
Coaches

Pos.	#	Name	Height	Year	Previous school	Hometown
G	0	Ebere Egbirika	5 ft 7 in (1.7 m)	Sr	City of London Academy, Southwark; Stony Brook	London, England
G/F	1	Nikola Zdenkova	5 ft 9 in (1.75 m)	RS Sr	Gymnázium Prípotocní; Siena	Karlovy Vary, Czech Republic
G	2	Jada Mills	5 ft 9 in (1.75 m)	Sr	Putnam Science Academy; Stony Brook	Norwich, CT
G	3	Soreya Yilmaz	5 ft 8 in (1.73 m)	Fr	St. Paul Catholic High School	Milton, Ontario
G/F	4	Aniyah Neal	5 ft 11 in (1.8 m)	So	Loomis Chaffee School; Quinnipiac	Syracuse, NY
G	5	Ineivi Plata	5 ft 3 in (1.6 m)	Jr	White Plains Senior High School; Florida Atlantic	White Plains, NY
G	9	Sophie Staunton	5 ft 10 in (1.78 m)	Fr	St. Finians CC	Swords, Ireland
F	10	Layla Christopher	6 ft 2 in (1.88 m)	Fr	Orangeville District Secondary School	Ottawa, Ontario
G	11	Bree Riley	5 ft 6 in (1.68 m)	So	Grand Oaks High School; Abilene Christian	Spring, TX
G	12	Emily O'Connell	5 ft 7 in (1.7 m)	Sr	City of London Academy, Southwark	London, England
C	14	Carys Roy	6 ft 3 in (1.91 m)	Sr	Cowbridge Comprehensive School	Cowbridge, Wales
G	22	Sierra Patricio	5 ft 9 in (1.75 m)	So	Capital Courts Academy	Toronto, Ontario
G	25	Eszter Turi	6 ft 1 in (1.85 m)	Sr	Hunfalvy Janos Bilingual Secondary School; Siena	Budapest, Hungary
F	32	Lamaria Estridge	5 ft 11 in (1.8 m)	Jr	St. Andrew's Episcopal School; Shepherd	Walkersville, MD
F	45	Alexandra Wilson	6 ft 1 in (1.85 m)	Fr	Chantilly High School	Chantilly, VA

Head coach

- Jennifer Leedham (Franklin Pierce)

Assistant coach(es)

- David Jollon (Thomas Edison State)
- Johannah Leedham-Warner (Franklin Pierce)
- Tay Hughes (Saint Peter's)

Legend

- (C) Team captain
- (S) Suspended
- (I) Ineligible
- (W) Walk-on
- Injured
- Current redshirt

Roster
Last update: September 13, 2026

== Schedule and results ==
Date time, TV	Rank^{#}	Opponent^{#}	Result	Record	High points	High rebounds	High assists	Site (attendance) city, state
Non-conference regular season
November 3, 2026*; TBA		at Pittsburgh						Petersen Events Center; Pittsburgh, PA
November 7, 2026*; TBA		at Georgetown						McDonough Arena; Washington, D.C.
November 12, 2026*; TBA		at Miami (FL)						Watsco Center; Coral Gables, FL
November 18, 2026*; TBA		Lafayette						Run Baby Run Arena; Jersey City, NJ
November 21, 2026*; TBA		at LIU						Steinberg Wellness Center; Brooklyn, NY
November 23, 2026*; TBA		at Fairleigh Dickinson						Bogota Savings Bank Center; Hackensack, NJ
November 25, 2026*; TBA		NJIT						Run Baby Run Arena; Jersey City, NJ
December 2, 2026*; TBA		at Rutgers						Jersey Mike's Arena; Piscataway, NJ
December 9, 2026*; TBA		at Yale						John J. Lee Amphitheater; New Haven, CT
December 13, 2026*; TBA		Wilmington (DE)						Run Baby Run Arena; Jersey City, NJ
Metro Conference regular season
December 21, 2026; TBA		at Sacred Heart						William H. Pitt Center; Fairfield, CT
December 29, 2026; TBA		Manhattan						Run Baby Run Arena; Jersey City, NJ
January 1, 2027; TBA		Quinnipiac						Run Baby Run Arena; Jersey City, NJ
January 3, 2027; TBA		at Rider						Canastra Hammer Arena; Lawrenceville, NJ
January 7, 2027; TBA		Canisius						Run Baby Run Arena; Jersey City, NJ
January 9, 2027; TBA		Niagara						Run Baby Run Arena; Jersey City, NJ
January 13, 2027; TBA		at Merrimack						Lawler Arena; North Andover, MA
January 16, 2027; TBA		at Siena						UHY Center; Loudonville, NY
January 18, 2027; TBA		Mount St. Mary's						Run Baby Run Arena; Jersey City, NJ
January 23, 2027; TBA		Rider						Run Baby Run Arena; Jersey City, NJ
January 28, 2027; TBA		at Canisius						Koessler Athletic Center; Buffalo, NY
January 30, 2027; TBA		at Niagara						Gallagher Center; Lewiston, NY
February 4, 2027; TBA		Rider						Run Baby Run Arena; Jersey City, NJ
February 6, 2027; TBA		Fairfield						Run Baby Run Arena; Jersey City, NJ
February 11, 2027; TBA		at Iona						Hynes Athletic Center; New Rochelle, NY
February 13, 2027; TBA		at Marist						McCann Arena; Poughkeepsie, NY
February 18, 2027; TBA		Sacred Heart						Run Baby Run Arena; Jersey City, NJ
February 20, 2027; TBA		at Manhattan						Draddy Gymnasium; Riverdale, NY
February 25, 2027; TBA		at Quinnipiac						M&T Bank Arena; Hamden, CT
February 27, 2027; TBA		Iona						Run Baby Run Arena; Jersey City, NJ
*Non-conference game. ^{#}Rankings from AP Poll. (#) Tournament seedings in parentheses. All times are in Eastern.
