= 2026–27 Rider Broncs women's basketball team =

American college basketball season

2026–27 Rider Broncs women's basketball
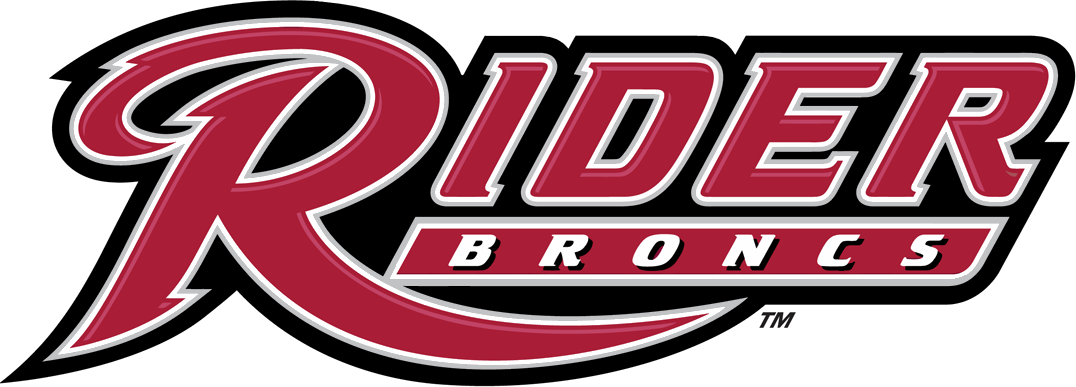
- Conference: Metro Conference
- Record: 1–1 (0–0 Metro)
- Head coach: Jackie Hartzell (2nd season)
- Assistant coaches: Jim Ricci; Tom Lochner; Scarlett Glasser-Nehls
- Home arena: Canastra Hammer Arena

2026–27 Metro Conference women's basketball standings
	Conf.				Overall
Team	W		L	PCT	W		L	PCT
Fairfield	0	–	0	–	3	–	0	1.000
Canisius	0	–	0	–	2	–	0	1.000
Rider	0	–	0	–	1	–	1	.500
Sacred Heart	0	–	0	–	1	–	2	.333
Iona	0	–	0	–	1	–	3	.250
Manhattan	0	–	0	–	1	–	3	.250
Quinnipiac	0	–	0	–	1	–	3	.250
Siena	0	–	0	–	1	–	3	.250
Saint Peter's	0	–	0	–	0	–	3	.000
Marist	0	–	0	–	0	–	4	.000
Merrimack	0	–	0	–	0	–	4	.000
Mount St. Mary's	0	–	0	–	0	–	4	.000
Niagara	0	–	0	–	0	–	4	.000
† 2027 Metro Conference tournament winner As of November 14, 2026

The 2026–27 Rider Broncs women's basketball team currently represents Rider University during the 2026–27 NCAA Division I women's basketball season. The Broncs, led by second-year head coach Jackie Hartzell, play their home games at the Canastra Hammer Arena in Lawrenceville, New Jersey, and compete as a member of the newly renamed Metro Conference.

== Previous season ==
The Broncs finished the 2025–26 season 7–22 overall and 5–15 in MAAC play, both for the second consecutive season, to finish in eleventh in the conference. They failed to qualify for the MAAC tournament.

== Offseason ==
=== Departures ===
Rider departures
Name	Num.	Pos.	Height	Year	Hometown	Reason for departure
Daniya Brown	0	Guard	5'7"	Freshman	Fairfax, VA	Transferred to Howard CC (NJCAA)
Deb Okechukwu	3	Guard	5'9"	(redshirt) Junior	Washington, D.C.	Transferred to Stony Brook
Amany Lopez	10	Guard	5'8"	Sophomore	Springfield, MA	Transferred to UNC Asheville
Emmy Roach	11	Guard	6'0"	Sophomore	Littlehampton, Australia	Transferred to Gonzaga
Claudia Lazaro-Carrasco	21	Center	6'2"	Freshman	Madrid, Spain	Transferred to New Haven
Kristina Ekofo	22	Forward	6'1"	Graduate Student	Brussels, Belgium	Graduated
Jocelyn Chavez	23	Guard	5'9"	Sophomore	Surprise, AZ	Entered transfer portal
Kaylan Deveney	44	Center	6'3"	Junior	Medford, NJ	Transferred to Wyoming

=== Incoming transfers ===
Rider incoming transfers
Name	Num.	Pos.	Height	Year	Hometown	Previous school
Gabby Sweeney	2	Forward	6'1"	Junior	East Fishkill, NY	Mercyhurst
Gianna Hoddinot	12	Guard	5'9"	Graduate Student	Littlestown, PA	Mount St. Mary's
Julia Karpell	31	Guard/Forward	5'11"	Junior	Holmdel, NJ	Fairfield

=== Recruiting class ===
There was no 2026 recruiting class.

== Roster ==
Years are listed according to the new NCAA age-based eligibility model.

2026–27 Rider Broncs women's basketball team
Players
Coaches

Pos.	#	Name	Height	Year	Previous school	Hometown
G	0	Rebekah Hartzell	5 ft 9 in (1.75 m)	Fr	Southern Wake Academy	Raleigh, NC
G	1	Aliya McIver	5 ft 9 in (1.75 m)	Sr	White Plains High School	White Plains, NY
F	2	Gabby Sweeney	6 ft 1 in (1.85 m)	Jr	John Jay High School; Mercyhurst	East Fishkill, NY
G	9	Aina Perez Mesquida	5 ft 9 in (1.75 m)	Fr	IES CTEIB	Manacor, Spain
G	10	Millie Perry	5 ft 10 in (1.78 m)	Fr	Liberty North High School	Kansas City, MO
G	11	Ainsley Gibson	6 ft 0 in (1.83 m)	Fr	Patrick Henry High School	Roanoke, VA
G	12	Giana Hoddinott	5 ft 9 in (1.75 m)	GS	Delone Catholic High School; Mount St. Mary's	Littlestown, PA
G	13	Alena Cofield	5 ft 3 in (1.6 m)	So	Neshaminy High School	Langhorne, PA
F	14	Sam Richardson	6 ft 3 in (1.91 m)	Sr	St. Benedict's Prep	Linden, NJ
F	23	Jordan Barnes	6 ft 0 in (1.83 m)	Fr	St. Thomas Aquinas High School	South Plainfield, NJ
F	24	Colleen Besachio	5 ft 11 in (1.8 m)	Fr	Archbishop Wood High School	Upper Dublin, PA
G/F	31	Julia Karpell	5 ft 11 in (1.8 m)	Jr	Saint John Vianney High School; Fairfield	Holmdel, NJ

Head coach

- Jackie Hartzell (La Salle)

Assistant coach(es)

- Jim Ricci (La Salle)
- Tom Lochner (Temple)
- Scarlett Glasser-Nehls (Arcadia)

Legend

- (C) Team captain
- (S) Suspended
- (I) Ineligible
- (W) Walk-on
- Injured
- Current redshirt

Roster
Last update: September 9, 2026

== Schedule and results ==
Date time, TV	Rank^{#}	Opponent^{#}	Result	Record	High points	High rebounds	High assists	Site (attendance) city, state
Exhibition
October 21, 2026*; 5:30 p.m.		at Monmouth	L 49–78		15 – Karpell	7 – Sweeney	2 – Tied	OceanFirst Bank Center (346); West Long Beach, NJ
Non-conference regular season
November 2, 2026*; 6:00 p.m., ESPN+		at NJIT	L 45–50	0–1	16 – Hoddinott	11 – Sweeney	5 – Sweeney	Wellness and Events Center (242); Newark, NJ
November 12, 2026*; 7:00 p.m., NEC Front Row		at Central Connecticut	W 56–45	1–1	18 – Hoddinott	11 – Sweeney	6 – Sweeney	Detrick Gymnasium (323); New Britain, CT
November 14, 2026*; 11:00 a.m., ESPN+		at Yale						John J. Lee Amphitheater; New Haven, CT
November 17, 2026; 7:00 p.m., YES Network		at Fairleigh Dickinson						Bogota Savings Bank Center; Hackensack, NJ
November 20, 2026; 7:00 p.m., NEC Front Row		at Wagner						Spiro Sports Center; Staten Island, NY
November 23, 2026; 7:00 p.m., ESPN+		at Seton Hall						Walsh Gymnasium; South Orange, NJ
December 2, 2026; 6:00 p.m., ESPN+		LIU						Canastra Hammer Arena; Lawrenceville, NJ
December 6, 2026; 1:00 p.m., ESPN+		at Lafayette						Kirby Sports Center; Easton, PA
December 12, 2026; 2:00 p.m., ESPN+		at George Washington						Charles E. Smith Center; Washington, D.C.
Metro Conference regular season
December 19, 2026; 2:00 p.m., ESPN+		Canisius						Canastra Hammer Arena; Lawrenceville, NJ
December 21, 2026; 6:00 p.m., ESPN+		Niagara						Canastra Hammer Arena; Lawrenceville, NJ
December 29, 2026; 6:30 p.m., ESPN+		at Quinnipiac						M&T Bank Arena; Hamden, CT
January 1, 2027; 2:00 p.m., ESPN+		at Fairfield						Leo D. Mahoney Arena; Fairfield, CT
January 3, 2027; 2:00 p.m., ESPN+		Saint Peter's						Canastra Hammer Arena; Lawrenceville, NJ
January 7, 2027; 7:00 p.m., ESPN+		at Mount St. Mary's						Knott Arena; Emmitsburg, MD
January 13, 2027; 6:00 p.m., ESPN+		Iona						Canastra Hammer Arena; Lawrenceville, NJ
January 16, 2027; 6:00 p.m., ESPN+		Manhattan						Canastra Hammer Arena; Lawrenceville, NJ
January 18, 2027; 2:00 p.m., ESPN+		at Marist						McCann Arena; Poughkeepsie, NY
January 21, 2027; 6:00 p.m., ESPN+		Fairfield						Canastra Hammer Arena; Lawrenceville, NJ
January 23, 2027; 2:00 p.m., ESPN+		at Saint Peter's						Run Baby Run Arena; Jersey City, NJ
January 28, 2027; 7:00 p.m., ESPN+		at Sacred Heart						William H. Pitt Center; Fairfield, CT
January 30, 2027; 1:00 p.m., ESPN+		Quinnipiac						Canastra Hammer Arena; Lawrenceville, NJ
February 6, 2027; 12:00 p.m., ESPN+		at Merrimack						Lawler Arena; North Andover, MA
February 11, 2027; 6:00 p.m., ESPN+		Mount St. Mary's						Canastra Hammer Arena; Lawrenceville, NJ
February 13, 2027; 2:00 p.m., ESPN+		at Manhattan						Draddy Gymnasium; Riverdale, NY
February 18, 2027; 6:00 p.m., ESPN+		Siena						Canastra Hammer Arena; Lawrenceville, NJ
February 20, 2027; 2:00 p.m., ESPN+		Marist						Canastra Hammer Arena; Lawrenceville, NJ
February 25, 2027; 6:00 p.m., ESPN+		at Niagara						Gallagher Center; Lewiston, NY
February 27, 2027; 1:00 p.m., ESPN+		at Canisius						Koessler Athletic Center; Buffalo, NY
*Non-conference game. ^{#}Rankings from AP Poll. (#) Tournament seedings in parentheses. All times are in Eastern.
