= 2026–27 Merrimack Warriors women's basketball team =

American college basketball season

2026–27 Merrimack Warriors women's basketball
- Conference: Metro Conference
- Record: 0–0 (0–0 Metro)
- Head coach: Missy Traversi (1st season)
- Assistant coaches: Glenn Rigney; Brie Wajer; Claire Gritt; Zyon Bell; Cenk Akarpinar
- Home arena: Lawler Arena

2026–27 Metro Conference women's basketball standings
	Conf.				Overall
Team	W		L	PCT	W		L	PCT
Fairfield	0	–	0	–	3	–	2	.600
Iona	0	–	0	–	3	–	3	.500
Manhattan	0	–	0	–	3	–	3	.500
Canisius	0	–	0	–	2	–	2	.500
Quinnipiac	0	–	0	–	3	–	4	.429
Rider	0	–	0	–	2	–	3	.400
Siena	0	–	0	–	2	–	4	.333
Saint Peter's	0	–	0	–	1	–	3	.250
Sacred Heart	0	–	0	–	1	–	4	.200
Marist	0	–	0	–	1	–	5	.167
Merrimack	0	–	0	–	0	–	6	.000
Mount St. Mary's	0	–	0	–	0	–	6	.000
Niagara	0	–	0	–	0	–	6	.000
† 2027 Metro Conference tournament winner As of November 21, 2026

The 2026–27 Merrimack Warriors women's basketball team will represent Merrimack College during the 2026–27 NCAA Division I women's basketball season. The Warriors, led by first-year head coach Missy Traversi, will play their home games at Lawler Arena in North Andover, Massachusetts and compete as a member of the newly renamed Metro Conference.

== Previous season ==
The Warriors finished the 2025–26 season 19–13 overall and 15–5 in MAAC play, to finish in third place in the conference. As the No. 3 seed in the MAAC tournament, they defeated No. 6 Mount St. Mary's in the quarterfinals before falling to No. 2 and No. 25 nationally ranked Fairfield in the semifinals.

Following the elimination, the Warriors were invited and accepted an at-large bid to the WNIT, making it their very first tournament birth, as well as their first ever participation in the Division I postseason since becoming eligible in 2023. They lost in Round 1 65–68 to NJIT to end their season.

On April 4, it was announced that head coach Kelly Morrone had stepped down from the program in order to accept the head coaching job at Albany, ending her six-year tenure with the team. Two days later, Army head coach Missy Traversi was announced as the program's new head coach. Traversi had served for as the program's head coach since 2021, and led the Black Knights to a 26–8 record and a WNIT Super 16 appearance in the 2025–26 season.

== Offseason ==
=== Departures ===
Merrimack departures
Name	Number	Pos.	Height	Year	Hometown	Reason for departure
Madison Roman	0	Forward	6'0"	Junior	Fairfield, CT	Transferred to Albany
Daria Shishkina	2	Guard	5'11"	Sophomore	Moscow, Russia	Transferred to Albany
Makayla Thomas	3	Guard	5'7"	Junior	Brooklyn, NY	Transferred to Daemen (D-II)
Denae Skelton	4	Guard	5'7"	Sophomore	West Kelowna, British Columbia	Transferred to Alaska Fairbanks (D-II)
Mia Fiore	5	Guard	5'10"	Sophomore	Narragansett, RI	Transferred to Rhode Island
Paloma Garcia	10	Guard	5'6"	Junior	Corozal, PR	Transferred to Hofstra
Oralye Kiefer	11	Forward	6'3"	Graduate Student	Wayland, MA	Transferred to Sacred Heart
Claudia Gallegos	12	Forward	6'2"	Senior	Naperville, IL	Graduated
Se'Lah Reddick	15	Guard	5'8"	Senior	Jacksonville, FL	Graduated
Cadence Johnson	21	Forward	6'0"	Junior	Mattapoisett, MA	Transferred to Albany (Note: Did not play in the 2025–26 season.)
Lydia Melaschenko	22	Guard	5'7"	Senior	Ottawa, Ontario	Graduated
Molly Manion	24	Guard	5'11"	Graduate Student	West Chester, PA	Graduated
Kylee Fears	32	Forward	6'1"	(redshirt) Sophomore	Oxford, OH	Transferred to Wayne State (D-II)

=== Incoming transfers ===
Merrimack incoming transfers
Name	Number	Pos.	Height	Year	Hometown	Previous school
Olivia Vick	7	Guard	5'5"	Junior	Chicago, IL	Trinity College (D-III)
Naomi Wilson	8	Forward	6'3"	Senior	Baldivis, Australia	Winthrop
Emma Dibarboure	11	Forward	6'1"	Sophomore	Madrid, Spain	Western Michigan
Csenge Szomszed	13	Forward	6'2"	Junior	Hort, Hungary	Casper College (NJCAA)
Jamie Kent	20	Forward	6'0"	Senior	Bay Area, CA	New Hampshire
Olivia Borsutzki	21	Guard	5'11"	Junior	Munich, Germany	Omaha
Kelsey Miller	40	Center	6'5"	Sophomore	Victoria, MN	High Point
Claudia Marina	44	Guard	5'11"	Junior	Madrid, Spain	FIU

=== Recruiting class ===
There was no 2026 recruiting class.

== Roster ==
Years are listed according to the new NCAA age-based eligibility model.

2026–27 Merrimack Warriors women's basketball team
Players
Coaches

Pos.	#	Name	Height	Year	Previous school	Hometown
G	1	Abriel Grant-Caracas	5 ft 5 in (1.65 m)	Fr	J. Addison School	Toronto, Ontario
G	5	Claudia Crespo	6 ft 1 in (1.85 m)	Fr		Zaragoza, Spain
G	7	Olivia Vick	5 ft 5 in (1.65 m)	Jr	Whitney M. Young High School; Trinity College	Chicago, IL
F	8	Naomi Wilson	6 ft 3 in (1.91 m)	Sr	Winthrop	Baldivis, Australia
G	10	Kristen Kelley	6 ft 1 in (1.85 m)	Jr	Marion L. Steele High School	Amherst, OH
F	11	Emma Dibarboure	6 ft 1 in (1.85 m)	So	Ramiro de Maeztu High School; Western Michigan	Madrid, Spain
G	12	Mia Carmody	5 ft 8 in (1.73 m)	Fr	Clayton A. Bouton High School	Voorheesville, NY
F	13	Csenge Szomszed	6 ft 2 in (1.88 m)	Jr	Eötvös József Evangélikus Gimnázium; Casper College	Hort, Hungary
F	20	Jamie Kent	6 ft 0 in (1.83 m)	Sr	Carondelet High School; New Hampshire	Bay Area, CA
G	21	Olivia Borsutzki	5 ft 11 in (1.8 m)	Jr	Neuhof Schulen; Omaha	Munich, Germany
G	22	Joi Williams	5 ft 5 in (1.65 m)	So	Cuyahoga Valley Christian Academy	Alliance, OH
G	24	Samantha Grella	5 ft 11 in (1.8 m)	Fr	Immaculate Heart Academy	Nutley, NJ
F/C	33	Jenna Mishou	6 ft 2 in (1.88 m)	Fr	Archbishop Williams High School	Hanson, MA
C	40	Kelsey Miller	6 ft 5 in (1.96 m)	So	Chanhassen High School; High Point	Victoria, MN
G	44	Claudia Marina	5 ft 11 in (1.8 m)	Jr	IES Alfredo Kraus; FIU	Madrid, Spain

Head coach

- Missy Traversi (Maine)

Assistant coach(es)

- Glenn Rigney (Miami)
- Brie Wajer (Villanova)
- Claire Gritt (Denver)
- Zyon Bell (Seton Hall)
- Cenk Akarpinar (Gaziantep

Legend

- (C) Team captain
- (S) Suspended
- (I) Ineligible
- (W) Walk-on
- Injured
- Current redshirt

Roster
Last update: September 9, 2026

== Schedule and results ==
Date time, TV	Rank^{#}	Opponent^{#}	Result	Record	High points	High rebounds	High assists	Site (attendance) city, state
Metro Conference regular season
December 19, 2026; TBA		Siena						Lawler Arena; North Andover, MA
December 21, 2026; TBA		at Fairfield						Leo D. Mahoney Arena; Fairfield, CT
December 29, 2026; TBA		at Iona						Hynes Athletic Center; New Rochelle, NY
January 1, 2027; TBA		Manhattan						Lawler Arena; North Andover, MA
January 3, 2027; TBA		at Quinnipiac						M&T Bank Arena; Hamden, CT
January 7, 2027; TBA		at Marist						McCann Arena; Poughkeepsie, NY
January 9, 2027; TBA		Fairfield						Lawler Arena; North Andover, MA
January 13, 2027; TBA		Saint Peter's						Lawler Arena; North Andover, MA
January 16, 2027; TBA		at Canisius						Koessler Athletic Center; Buffalo, NY
January 18, 2027; TBA		at Niagara						Gallagher Center; Lewiston, NY
January 21, 2027; TBA		Marist						Lawler Arena; North Andover, MA
January 23, 2027; TBA		at Manhattan						Draddy Gymnasium; Riverdale, NY
January 28, 2027; TBA		Mount St. Mary's						Lawler Arena; North Andover, MA
February 4, 2027; TBA		at Saint Peter's						Run Baby Run Arena; Jersey City, NJ
February 6, 2027; TBA		Rider						Lawler Arena; North Andover, MA
February 11, 2027; TBA		at Siena						UHY Center; Loudonville, NY
February 18, 2027; TBA		Niagara						Lawler Arena; North Andover, MA
February 20, 2027; TBA		Canisius						Lawler Arena; North Andover, MA
February 25, 2027; TBA		at Sacred Heart						William H. Pitt Center; Fairfield, CT
February 27, 2027; TBA		Quinnipiac						Lawler Arena; North Andover, MA
*Non-conference game. ^{#}Rankings from AP Poll. (#) Tournament seedings in parentheses. All times are in Eastern.
