= 2026–27 Mount St. Mary's Mountaineers women's basketball team =

American college basketball season

2026–27 Mount St. Mary's Mountaineers women's basketball
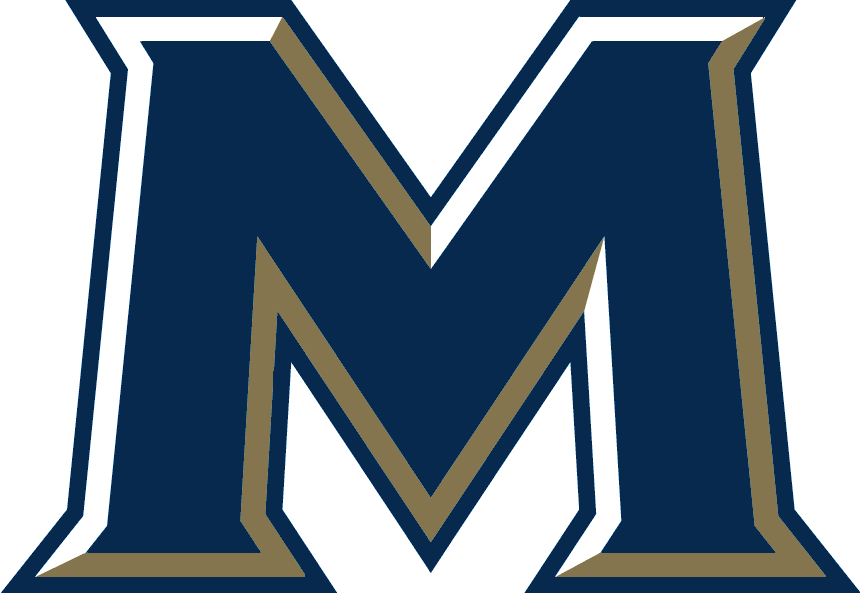
- Conference: Metro Conference
- Record: 1–6 (0–0 Metro)
- Head coach: Antoine White (6th season)
- Assistant coaches: Kelsey Funderburgh; Maria McConnell; Travis Crandall; Mia Andrews
- Home arena: Knott Arena

2026–27 Metro Conference women's basketball standings
	Conf.				Overall
Team	W		L	PCT	W		L	PCT
Fairfield	0	–	0	–	3	–	2	.600
Iona	0	–	0	–	3	–	3	.500
Manhattan	0	–	0	–	3	–	3	.500
Canisius	0	–	0	–	2	–	2	.500
Quinnipiac	0	–	0	–	3	–	4	.429
Rider	0	–	0	–	2	–	3	.400
Siena	0	–	0	–	2	–	4	.333
Saint Peter's	0	–	0	–	1	–	3	.250
Sacred Heart	0	–	0	–	1	–	4	.200
Marist	0	–	0	–	1	–	5	.167
Merrimack	0	–	0	–	0	–	6	.000
Mount St. Mary's	0	–	0	–	0	–	6	.000
Niagara	0	–	0	–	0	–	6	.000
† 2027 Metro Conference tournament winner As of November 22, 2026

The 2026–27 Mount St. Mary's Mountaineers women's basketball team currently represents Mount St. Mary's University during the 2026–27 NCAA Division I women's basketball season. The Mountaineers, led by sixth-year head coach Antoine White, play their home games at Knott Arena in Emmitsburg, Maryland, and compete as a member of the newly renamed Metro Conference.

== Previous season ==
The Mountaineers finished the 2025–26 season 15–15 overall and 9–11 in MAAC play, to finish sixth in the conference. As the No. 6 seed in the MAAC tournament, they lost in the quarterfinals 48–62 to No. 4 Merrimack.

== Offseason ==
=== Departures ===
Mount St. Mary's departures
Name	Number	Pos.	Height	Year	Hometown	Reason for departure
Berlynn Carlson	1	Forward	6'3"	Freshman	Beaverton, OR	Transferred to Oakland
Erin Edmonds	2	Guard	5'10"	Freshman	Hopewell, VA	Transferred to New Hampshire
Zaria Harleaux	8	Forward	6'1"	Graduate Student	Baton Rouge, LA	Graduated
Kayla Lindsey	11	Guard	5'9"	Junior	Norcross, GA	Transferred to Louisiana–Monroe
Gianna Hoddinott	12	Guard	5'9"	(redshirt) Junior	Littlestown, PA	Transferred to Rider
Amber Bullard	14	Center	6'4"	Junior	Philadelphia, PA	Transferred to Cincinnati
Gabrielle Kennerly	15	Guard	5'9"	(redshirt) Sophomore	Charlotte, NC	Transferred to South Florida
Jaedyn Jamison	20	Forward	6'1"	(redshirt) Senior	Rocky Mount, VA	Graduated
Mikaela Parris	21	Forward	6'0"	Senior	Toronto, Ontario	Graduated
Deniz Torgut	35	Guard	5'10"	(redshirt) Junior	İzmir, Turkey	Entered transfer portal

=== Incoming transfers ===
Mount St. Mary's incoming transfers
Name	Number	Pos.	Height	Year	Hometown	Previous school
Neveah Ferrara Horne	11	Forward	6'2"	Senior	Regina, Saskatchewan	San Francisco
Valentina Saric	14	Guard/Forward	6'2"	Graduate Student	Los Altos, CA	Northern Arizona
Thelma Barbitch	20	Guard	5'10"	Junior	Paris, France	Charleston Southern
Yacine Ndiaye	23	Forward	6'4"	Senior	Pout, Senegal	Rutgers
Eva Andrews	32	Guard	5'8"	Junior	Willow Grove, PA	North Carolina A&T

=== Recruiting class ===
There was no 2026 recruiting class.

== Roster ==
2026–27 Mount St. Mary's Mountaineers women's basketball team
Players
Coaches

Pos.	#	Name	Height	Year	Previous school	Hometown
G	0	Nyodie Guerard	5 ft 8 in (1.73 m)	Jr	Cégep de Sainte-Foy	Quebec City, Quebec
G	1	Karmen McDuffie	5 ft 7 in (1.7 m)	Fr	Mount Zion Prep	Bowie, MD
G	2	Jayla Koser	5 ft 10 in (1.78 m)	Fr	Middletown Area High School	Middletown, PA
G	3	Wesleigh Ferguson	6 ft 0 in (1.83 m)	Jr	IMG Academy	Benton, AR
F	5	Lenora Nkangwen	6 ft 1 in (1.85 m)	Jr	Connelly School of the Holy Child	Upper Marlboro, MD
G	6	Severyn Ferrara Horne	5 ft 10 in (1.78 m)	Fr	Athol Murray College of Notre Dame	Regina, Saskatchewan
G	7	Alana Powell	5 ft 8 in (1.73 m)	Sr	Osbourn Park High School; Omaha	Haymarket, VA
G	8	Kiyla Fowler	5 ft 6 in (1.68 m)	Fr	The Newman School	Mississauga, Ontario
F	10	Teodora Ivanovic	6 ft 2 in (1.88 m)	RS So	Central Pointe Christian Academy	Šimanovci, Serbia
F	11	Neveah Ferrara Horne	6 ft 2 in (1.88 m)	Sr	Southwest Academy; San Francisco	Regina, Saskatchewan
G/F	14	Valentina Saric	6 ft 2 in (1.88 m)	GS	Woodside Priory School; Northern Arizona	Los Altos, CA
G	20	Thelma Barbitch	5 ft 10 in (1.78 m)	Jr	Centre National d'Education a Distance; Charleston Southern	Paris, France
G	21	Giselle Wyche	5 ft 8 in (1.73 m)	Fr	James Hubert Blake High School	Beltsville, MD
F	23	Yacine Ndiaye	6 ft 4 in (1.93 m)	Sr	Lake Forest Academy; Rutgers	Pout, Senegal
G	32	Eva Andrews	5 ft 8 in (1.73 m)	Jr	Paul VI High School; North Carolina A&T	Willow Grove, PA
F	45	Rachael Chilicki	6 ft 4 in (1.93 m)	Fr	Mukwonago High School	Elkhorn, WI

Head coach

- Antoine White (Southern Vermont)

Assistant coach(es)

- Kelsey Funderburgh (Walsh)
- Maria McConnell (Mercyhurst)
- Travis Crandall (Penn State)
- Mia Andrews (Fairleigh Dickinson)

Legend

- (C) Team captain
- (S) Suspended
- (I) Ineligible
- (W) Walk-on
- Injured
- Current redshirt

Roster
Last update: September 11, 2026

== Schedule and results ==
Date time, TV	Rank^{#}	Opponent^{#}	Result	Record	High points	High rebounds	High assists	Site (attendance) city, state
Exhibition
October 24, 2026*; TBA		at George Mason	L 57–99		15 – Saric	9 – Saric	4 – Ferguson	EagleBank Arena (720); Fairfax, VA
Non-conference regular season
November 2, 2026*; 7:00 p.m., ESPN+		Navy	L 63–91	0–1	16 – Koser	6 – Tied	6 – Powell	Knott Arena (904); Emmitsburg, MD
November 5, 2026*; 6:00 p.m., ESPN+		at UMBC; AE–Metro Challenge	L 53–79	0–2	11 – Tied	5 – Koser	4 – Powell	Chesapeake Employers Insurance Arena (474); Baltimore, MD
November 8, 2026*; 2:00 p.m., ESPN+		Albany; AE–Metro Challenge	L 57–77	0–3	15 – Guerard	5 – Tied	4 – Powell	Knott Arena (511); Emmitsburg, MD
November 11, 2026*; 6:00 p.m., ESPN+		at Lehigh	L 44–79	0–4	19 – Koser	5 – Saric	2 – Tied	Stabler Arena (662); Bethlehem, PA
November 14, 2026*; 2:00 p.m., ESPN+		Bucknell	L 48–73	0–5	10 – Powell	7 – McDuffie	4 – Powell	Knott Arena (926); Emmitsburg, MD
November 17, 2026*; 2:00 p.m., B1G+		at No. 23 Nebraska	L 37–113	0–6	16 – Koser	3 – Tied	1 – Tied	Pinnacle Bank Arena (4,108); Lincoln, NE
November 21, 2026*; 1:00 p.m., ESPN+		St. Mary's (MD)	W 78–28	1–6	18 – Saric	11 – Nkangwen	7 – Guerard	Knott Arena (482); Emmitsburg, MD
November 30, 2026*; 6:00 p.m., MEAC Network		at Maryland Eastern Shore						Hytche Athletic Center; Princess Anne, MD
December 3, 2026*; 7:00 p.m., ESPN+		at West Virginia						Hope Coliseum; Morgantown, WV
December 6, 2026*; 1:00 p.m.		at Dayton						UD Arena; Dayton, OH
December 10, 2026*; 6:00 p.m.		at Morgan State						Hill Field House; Baltimore, MD
December 13, 2026*; 12:00 p.m., B1G+		at Maryland						Xfinity Center; College Park, MD
Metro Conference regular season
December 19, 2026; 1:00 p.m., ESPN+		Niagara						Knott Arena; Emmitsburg, MD
December 19, 2026; 1:00 p.m.		Canisius						Knott Arena; Emmitsburg, MD
December 29, 2026; 2:00 p.m.		at Marist						McCann Arena; Poughkeepsie, NY
January 3, 2027; 6:00 p.m.		at Manhattan						Draddy Gymnasium; Riverdale, NY
January 7, 2027; 1:00 p.m.		Rider						Knott Arena; Emmitsburg, MD
January 9, 2027; 2:00 p.m.		at Siena						UHY Center; Loudonville, NY
January 13, 2027; 7:00 p.m.		Sacred Heart						Knott Arena; Emmitsburg, MD
January 16, 2027; 2:00 p.m.		at Fairfield						Leo D. Mahoney Arena; Fairfield, CT
January 18, 2027; TBA		at Saint Peter's						Run Baby Run Arena; Jersey City, NJ
January 21, 2027; 7:00 p.m.		Manhattan						Knott Arena; Emmitsburg, MD
January 23, 2027; 1:00 p.m.		Iona						Knott Arena; Emmitsburg, MD
January 28, 2027; TBA		at Merrimack						Lawler Arena; North Andover, MA
January 30, 2027; 2:00 p.m.		Fairfield						Knott Arena; Emmitsburg, MD
February 4, 2027; 11:00 a.m.		Siena						Knott Arena; Emmitsburg, MD
February 11, 2027; 6:00 p.m.		at Rider						Canastra Hammer Arena; Lawrenceville, NJ
February 13, 2027; TBA		at Sacred Heart						William H. Pitt Center; Fairfield, CT
February 18, 2027; 7:00 p.m.		Marist						Knott Arena; Emmitsburg, MD
February 20, 2027; 1:00 p.m.		Quinnipiac						Knott Arena; Emmitsburg, MD
February 25, 2027; 6:00 p.m.		at Canisius						Koessler Athletic Center; Buffalo, NY
February 27, 2027; TBA		at Niagara						Gallagher Center; Lewiston, NY
*Non-conference game. ^{#}Rankings from AP Poll. (#) Tournament seedings in parentheses. All times are in Eastern.
