= 2026–27 Iona Gaels women's basketball team =

American college basketball season

2026–27 Iona Gaels women's basketball
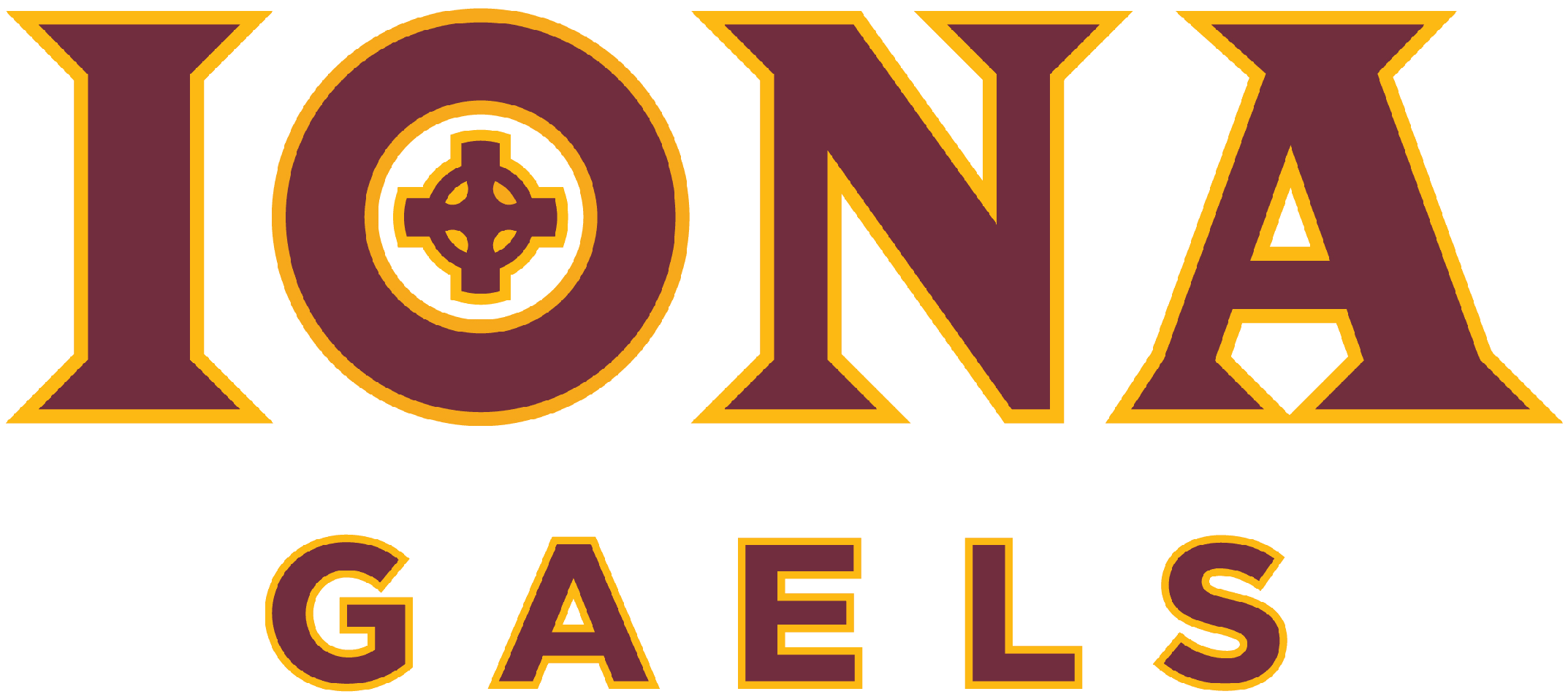
- Conference: Metro Conference
- Record: 1–3 (0–0 Metro)
- Head coach: Angelika Szumilo (4th season)
- Associate head coach: Jeanine Radice
- Assistant coaches: Dylan Nsiah; Abby Conklin; Cur'Tiera Haywood
- Home arena: Hynes Athletics Center

2026–27 Metro Conference women's basketball standings
	Conf.				Overall
Team	W		L	PCT	W		L	PCT
Canisius	0	–	0	–	2	–	0	1.000
Fairfield	0	–	0	–	1	–	0	1.000
Sacred Heart	0	–	0	–	1	–	2	.333
Manhattan	0	–	0	–	1	–	2	.333
Iona	0	–	0	–	1	–	3	.250
Quinnipiac	0	–	0	–	1	–	3	.250
Siena	0	–	0	–	1	–	3	.250
Rider	0	–	0	–	0	–	1	.000
Saint Peter's	0	–	0	–	0	–	2	.000
Merrimack	0	–	0	–	0	–	3	.000
Marist	0	–	0	–	0	–	4	.000
Mount St. Mary's	0	–	0	–	0	–	4	.000
Niagara	0	–	0	–	0	–	4	.000
† 2027 Metro Conference tournament winner As of November 13, 2026

The 2026–27 Iona Gaels women's basketball team currently represents Iona University during the 2026–27 NCAA Division I women's basketball season. The Gaels, led by fourth-year head coach Angelika Szumilo, play their home games at the Hynes Athletics Center in New Rochelle, New York, and compete as a member of the newly renamed Metro Conference.

== Previous season ==
The Gaels finished the 2025–26 season 20–12 overall and 12–8 in MAAC play, to finish in fourth in the conference. As the No. 4 seed in the MAAC tournament, they defeated No. 5 Siena 59–50 in the quarterfinals before falling 62–63 in overtime to top-seeded Quinnipiac in the semifinals to end their season.

== Offseason ==
=== Departures ===
Iona departures
Name	Number	Pos.	Height	Year	Hometown	Reason for departure
Isabellah Middleton	2	Guard	5'9"	Graduate Student	Leesburg, VA	Graduated
Ale Civera	4	Guard	5'10"	Senior	Madrid, Spain	Graduated
Ella Fajardo	5	Guard	5'5"	Graduate Student	Bergenfield, NJ	Graduated
Naomi Barnwell	7	Forward	6'1"	Graduate Student	Chanteloup-les-Vignes, France	Graduated
Yannie Chen	13	Guard	5'10"	Graduate Student	Hong Kong	Graduated
Amaya B. Evans	21	Guard	5'5"	Senior	Neptune, NJ	Graduated, entered transfer portal
Zoey Ward	30	Forward	6'0"	Junior	Gastonia, NC	Transferred to DePaul

=== Incoming transfers ===
Iona incoming transfers
Name	Number	Pos.	Height	Year	Hometown	Previous school
Anyla Hebert	20	Forward	6'0"	Junior	Grand Prairie, TX	Kilgore (NJCAA)
Taylor Smith	22	Forward	6'2"	Senior	Birmingham, AL	Wallace State CC (NJCAA)

=== Recruiting class ===
There was no 2026 recruiting class.

== Roster ==
Years are listed according to the new NCAA age-based eligibility model.

2026–27 Iona Gaels women's basketball team
Players
Coaches

Pos.	#	Name	Height	Year	Previous school	Hometown
G	0	Arianna Davis	5 ft 5 in (1.65 m)	So	St. Francis Prep	Queens, NY
G	1	Chloe Vasquez (C)	5 ft 10 in (1.78 m)	Jr	Pequannock Township High School	Pompton Plains, NJ
F	2	Kaitlynn Kenna	5 ft 10 in (1.78 m)	Fr	Canterbury High School	Bantam, CT
G	3	Nevaeh Stone	5 ft 5 in (1.65 m)	Jr	Monsignor Scanlan High School	The Bronx, NY
G	4	Olivia White	5 ft 9 in (1.75 m)	Fr	St. Luke's School	Bronx, New York
G	5	Giselle Grant	5 ft 8 in (1.73 m)	Fr	St. John's College High School	Baltimore, MD
F	7	Sophia Hickey	6 ft 1 in (1.85 m)	Fr	DME Academy	Melbourne, Australia
G	10	Adrianna Gonzalez	5 ft 7 in (1.7 m)	Jr	Indian Trail High School	Kenosha, WI
G	11	Claudia Fiel	5 ft 7 in (1.7 m)	Sr	Celta de Vigo Baloncesto; California Baptist	Pontevedra, Spain
F	12	Wilma Tuomi	6 ft 1 in (1.85 m)	RS Fr	Mäkelänrinteen lukio	Helsinki, Finland
G	14	Mya Zaccagnini (C)	5 ft 5 in (1.65 m)	Sr	Holy Cross High School	Waterbury, CT
F	18	Johanna Flores	5 ft 10 in (1.78 m)	So	The Academy of Central Florida	Cananea, Mexico
F	21	Anyla Hebert	6 ft 1 in (1.85 m)	Jr	South Grand Prairie High School; Kilgore College	Grand Prairie, TX
F	22	Taylor Smith	6 ft 2 in (1.88 m)	Sr	Briarwood Christian School; Wallace State CC	Birmingham, AL
F	35	Alana Wells	5 ft 10 in (1.78 m)	Fr	Ensworth High School	Nashville, TN

Head coach

- Angelika Szumilo (LIU Brooklyn)

Assistant coach(es)

- Jeanine Radice (Fordham)
- Dylan Nsiah (Georgia State)
- Abby Conklin (Fairleigh Dickinson)
- Cur'Tiera Haywood (Quinnipiac)

Legend

- (C) Team captain
- (S) Suspended
- (I) Ineligible
- (W) Walk-on
- Injured
- Current redshirt

Roster
Last update: September 8, 2026

== Schedule and results ==
Date time, TV	Rank^{#}	Opponent^{#}	Result	Record	High points	High rebounds	High assists	Site (attendance) city, state
Exhibition
October 17, 2026*; 11:00 a.m.		NJIT						Hynes Athletic Center; New Rochelle, NY
Non-conference regular season
November 2, 2026*; 11:00 a.m., ESPN+		Dominican	W 76–54	1–0	23 – Gonzalez	8 – Flores	7 – Zaccagnini	Hynes Athletic Center (925); New Rochelle, NY
November 5, 2026*; 1:00 p.m., ESPN+		Stony Brook	L 63–77	1–1	15 – Herbert	7 – Herbert	3 – Vasquez	Hynes Athletic Center (234); New Rochelle, NY
November 8, 2026*; 3:00 p.m., ESPN+		at Arizona	L 61–74	1–2	20 – Herbert	7 – Herbert	5 – Flores	McKale Center (4,841); Tucson, AZ
November 10, 2026*; 5:00 p.m., ESPN+		at No. 15 TCU	L 53–78	1–3	20 – Vasquez	5 – Vasquez	4 – Flores	Schollmaier Arena (2,118); Fort Worth, TX
November 15, 2026*; 1:00 p.m., ESPN+		Hofstra						Hynes Athletic Center; New Rochelle, NY
November 18, 2026*; 6:00 p.m., ESPN+		New Haven						Hynes Athletic Center; New Rochelle, NY
November 21, 2026*; 5:00 p.m., ESPN+		at Bucknell						Sojka Pavilion; Lewisburg, PA
November 27, 2026*; 12:00 p.m., ESPN+		UMBC; Turkey Tip-Off first round						Hynes Athletic Center; New Rochelle, NY
November 28, 2026*; TBD, ESPN+		Drexel or Southern Miss; Turkey Tip-Off						Hynes Athletic Center; New Rochelle, NY
December 2, 2026*; 7:00 p.m., NEC Front Row		at Wagner						Spiro Sports Center; Staten Island, NY
December 5, 2026*; 11:00 a.m., ESPN+		at Dartmouth						Leede Arena; Hanover, NH
December 12, 2026*; 2:00 p.m., ESPN+		La Salle						Hynes Athletic Center; New Rochelle, NY
Metro Conference regular season
December 19, 2026; 2:00 p.m., ESPN+		at Quinnipiac						M&T Bank Arena; Hamden, CT
December 21, 2026; TBA, ESPN+		at Marist						McCann Arena; Poughkeepsie, NY
December 29, 2026; TBA, ESPN+		Merrimack						Hynes Athletic Center; New Rochelle, NY
January 1, 2027; TBA, ESPN+		Siena						Hynes Athletic Center; New Rochelle, NY
January 3, 2027; TBA, ESPN+		at Fairfield						Leo D. Mahoney Arena; Fairfield, CT
January 7, 2027; TBA, ESPN+		Niagara						Hynes Athletic Center; New Rochelle, NY
January 9, 2027; TBA, ESPN+		Canisius						Hynes Athletic Center; New Rochelle, NY
January 13, 2027; TBA, ESPN+		at Rider						Canastra Hammer Arena; Lawrenceville, NJ
January 16, 2027; TBA, ESPN+		at Sacred Heart						William H. Pitt Center; Fairfield, CT
January 21, 2027; TBA, ESPN+		Quinnipiac						Hynes Athletic Center; New Rochelle, NY
January 23, 2027; TBA, ESPN+		at Mount St. Mary's						Knott Arena; Emmitsburg, MD
January 28, 2027; TBA, ESPN+		Marist						Hynes Athletic Center; New Rochelle, NY
January 30, 2027; TBA, ESPN+		Sacred Heart						Hynes Athletic Center; New Rochelle, NY
February 4, 2027; TBA, ESPN+		at Manhattan						Draddy Gymnasium; Riverdale, NY
February 6, 2027; TBA, ESPN+		at Siena						UHY Center; Loudonville, NY
February 11, 2027; TBA, ESPN+		Saint Peter's						Hynes Athletic Center; New Rochelle, NY
February 13, 2027; TBA, ESPN+		at Niagara						Gallagher Center; Lewiston, NY
February 18, 2027; TBA, ESPN+		Manhattan						Hynes Athletic Center; New Rochelle, NY
February 25, 2027; TBA, ESPN+		Fairfield						Hynes Athletic Center; New Rochelle, NY
February 27, 2027; TBA, ESPN+		at Saint Peter's						Run Baby Run Arena; Jersey City, NJ
*Non-conference game. ^{#}Rankings from AP Poll. (#) Tournament seedings in parentheses. All times are in Eastern.
