= 2026–27 Niagara Purple Eagles women's basketball team =

American college basketball season

2026–27 Niagara Purple Eagles women's basketball
- Conference: Metro Conference
- Record: 1–6 (0–0 Metro)
- Head coach: Tiara Johnson (1st season)
- Assistant coaches: Angel Parker; Candice Leatherwood; Dr. Jazmone Turner
- Home arena: Gallagher Center

2026–27 Metro Conference women's basketball standings
	Conf.				Overall
Team	W		L	PCT	W		L	PCT
Fairfield	0	–	0	–	3	–	2	.600
Iona	0	–	0	–	3	–	3	.500
Manhattan	0	–	0	–	3	–	3	.500
Canisius	0	–	0	–	2	–	2	.500
Quinnipiac	0	–	0	–	3	–	4	.429
Rider	0	–	0	–	2	–	3	.400
Siena	0	–	0	–	2	–	4	.333
Saint Peter's	0	–	0	–	1	–	3	.250
Sacred Heart	0	–	0	–	1	–	4	.200
Marist	0	–	0	–	1	–	5	.167
Merrimack	0	–	0	–	0	–	6	.000
Mount St. Mary's	0	–	0	–	0	–	6	.000
Niagara	0	–	0	–	0	–	6	.000
† 2027 Metro Conference tournament winner As of November 22, 2026

The 2026–27 Niagara Purple Eagles women's basketball team currently represents Niagara University during the 2026–27 NCAA Division I women's basketball season. The Purple Eagles, led by first-year head coach Tiara Johnson, play their home games at the Gallagher Center in Lewiston, New York and compete as a member of the newly renamed Metro Conference.

== Previous season ==
The Purple Eagles finished the 2025–26 season 1–28 overall and 1–19 in MAAC play, to finish last in the conference for the second straight season. They failed to qualify for the MAAC tournament. Their 1–28 record was the program's worst record since the 2010–11 season, when they went 1–29. The Purple Eagles' sole victory came during MAAC play on February 21, when they defeated Rider 56–52 at home.

On April 10, following the conclusion of the season, head coach Jada Pierce announced that she was resigning from the program after 11 years with the team, posting a 113–205 total record which included a 4–53 record over her last two seasons. On May 19, Tiara Johnson was announced as the team's new head coach, who was most recently serving as the associate head coach at St. Bonaventure. In the 2025–26 season, Johnson helped lead the Bonnies to a 17–16 season, including their first postseason appearance in a decade.

== Offseason ==
=== Departures ===
Niagara departures
Name	Number	Pos.	Height	Year	Hometown	Reason for departure
Tamari'a Rumph	0	Guard	5'4"	Junior	Sacramento, CA	Transferred to Hope International (NAIA)
Chasity Wilson	1	Guard	5'7"	Freshman	Newark, NJ	Transferred to Maryland Eastern Shore
Jordyn Williams	2	Forward	5'11"	Sophomore	Buffalo, NY	Transferred to St. Bonaventure
Tyasia Freeman	4	Forward	6'1"	Graduate Student	Waynesboro, GA	Graduated
Abimbola Adewumi	7	Guard	5'10"	(redshirt) Sophomore	Winnipeg, Manitoba	Transferred to East Mississippi CC (NJCAA)
Raven Sims	8	Guard	5'9"	Junior	Memphis, TN	Transferred to UT Martin (Note: Did not play in the 2025–26 season.)
Calina Fenceroy	12	Guard	5'5"	Graduate Student	Omaha, NE	Graduated
Talia Dial	13	Guard	5'10"	Senior	El Mirage, AZ	Graduated
Jade Rutledge	23	Forward	5'10"	Senior	Buffalo, NY	Graduated, entered transfer portal

=== Incoming transfers ===
Niagara incoming transfers
Name	Number	Pos.	Height	Year	Hometown	Previous school
Kimora Berry	1	Guard	5'7"	Sophomore	Buffalo, NY	Holy Cross
Violeta Rojas	5	Guard	5'10"	Senior	Manilva, Spain	Ball State
Liem Bastekar	10	Guard	5'7"	Junior	Gedera, Israel	Cisco College (NJCAA)

=== Recruiting class ===
There was no 2026 recruiting class.

== Roster ==
Years are listed according to the new NCAA age-based eligibility model.

2026–27 Niagara Purple Eagles women's basketball team
Players
Coaches

Pos.	#	Name	Height	Year	Previous school	Hometown
G	1	Kimora Berry	5 ft 10 in (1.78 m)	So	Williamsville South High School; Holy Cross	Buffalo, NY
G	2	Kennedy Coles	5 ft 5 in (1.65 m)	Fr	Upper Merion Area High School	Norristown, PA
F	3	Jade Campbell	6 ft 0 in (1.83 m)	Sr	Medgar Evers College Prep; St. Francis (PA)	Brooklyn, NY
G	4	Lauren Cooper	5 ft 7 in (1.7 m)	Fr	Charnwood College	Ayr, Scotland
G	5	Violeta Rojas	5 ft 10 in (1.78 m)	Sr	Ball State	Manilva, Spain
G	6	Katarina Veljovic	5 ft 11 in (1.8 m)	So	Royal Crown Academy	Toronto, Ontario
F	8	Alejandra Rioja	6 ft 1 in (1.85 m)	So	Colegio Villalkor	Madrid, Spain
F	9	Lily Deng-Lual	6 ft 4 in (1.93 m)	Fr		Juba, South Sudan
G	10	Liem Bestekar	5 ft 7 in (1.7 m)	Jr	Cisco College	Gedera, Israel
F	14	Ava Jean Williams	6 ft 1 in (1.85 m)	Fr	J. Addison School	Whitby, Ontario
F	15	Kenedie Haruna	6 ft 0 in (1.83 m)	So	Vanier	Montreal, Quebec
G	21	Jisca Bila	5 ft 7 in (1.7 m)	So	Royal Crown Academy	Ottawa, Ontario
G	23	Jalyn Moore	5 ft 9 in (1.75 m)	Fr	Gloucester Catholic High School	Voorhees, NJ
F	25	Tania Barredo	5 ft 9 in (1.75 m)	Fr	White River High School	Vigo, Spain

Head coach

- Tiara Johnson (St. Bonaventure)

Assistant coach(es)

- Angel Parker (Niagara)
- Candice Leatherwood (Sacred Heart)
- Dr. Jazmone Turner (Muskigum)

Legend

- (C) Team captain
- (S) Suspended
- (I) Ineligible
- (W) Walk-on
- Injured
- Current redshirt

Roster
Last update: September 9, 2026

== Schedule and results ==
Date time, TV	Rank^{#}	Opponent^{#}	Result	Record	High points	High rebounds	High assists	Site (attendance) city, state
Exhibition
October 23, 2026*; 4:00 p.m.		Alfred	W 71–36		13 – Moore	9 – Berry	4 – Berry	Gallagher Center; Lewiston, NY
Non-conference regular season
November 2, 2026*; 6:00 p.m., ESPN+		at Fordham	L 40–70	0–1	10 – Moore	7 – Campbell	3 – Tied	Rose Hill Gymnasium (439); The Bronx, NY
November 5, 2026*; 7:00 p.m., ESPN+		at UMass Lowell; AE–Metro Challenge	L 53–78	0–2	12 – Rojas	4 – Bila	2 – Tied	Kennedy Family Athletic Complex (208); Lowell, MA
November 8, 2026*; 1:00 p.m., ESPN+		New Hampshire; AE–Metro Challenge	L 52–71	0–3	17 – Haruna	5 – Tied	2 – Tied	Gallagher Center (269); Lewiston, NY
November 11, 2026*; 6:00 p.m., ESPN+		Stony Brook	L 40–71	0–4	8 – Deng-Lual	8 – Moore	2 – Veljovic	Gallagher Center (215); Lewiston, NY
November 14, 2026*; 1:00 p.m., ESPN+		Sacramento State	L 38–95	0–5	14 – Moore	4 – Bila	2 – Tied	Gallagher Center (186); Lewiston, NY
November 18, 2026*; 7:00 p.m., B1G+		at No. 2 Michigan	L 31–112	0–6	8 – Moore	7 – Campbell	2 – Tied	Crisler Arena (3,035); Ann Arbor, MI
November 21, 2026*; 1:00 p.m., ESPN+		Le Moyne	W 72–63	1–6	20 – Moore	6 – Haruna	2 – Tied	Gallagher Center (187); Lewiston, NY
November 24, 2026*; 6:00 p.m.		at Duquesne						UPMC Cooper Fieldhouse; Pittsburgh, PA
November 29, 2026*; 1:00 p.m., ESPN+		Monroe						Gallagher Center; Lewiston, NY
December 2, 2026*; 6:00 p.m., ESPN+		Cornell						Gallagher Center; Lewiston, NY
December 6, 2026*; 1:00 p.m., NEC Front Row		at Mercyhurst						Owen McCormick Court; Erie, PA
Metro Conference regular season
December 19, 2026; 1:00 p.m., ESPN+		at Mount St. Mary's						Knott Arena; Emmitsburg, MD
December 21, 2026; 4:00 p.m., ESPN+		at Rider						Canastra Hammer Arena; Lawrenceville, NJ
January 1, 2027*; 1:00 p.m., ESPN+		Sacred Heart						Gallagher Center; Lewiston, NY
January 3, 2027*; 12:00 p.m., ESPN+		Marist						Gallagher Center; Lewiston, NY
January 7, 2027; 6:00 p.m., ESPN+		at Iona						Hynes Athletics Center; New Rochelle, NY
January 9, 2027*; 2:00 p.m., ESPN+		at Saint Peter's						Run Baby Run Arena; Jersey City, NJ
January 16, 2027*; 1:00 p.m., ESPN+		Quinnipiac						Gallagher Center; Lewiston, NY
January 18, 2027*; 1:00 p.m., ESPN+		Merrimack						Gallagher Center; Lewiston, NY
January 21, 2027*; 6:00 p.m., ESPN+		at Siena						UHY Center; Loudonville, NY
January 23, 2027*; 1:00 p.m., ESPN+		at Canisius; Rivalry						Koessler Athletic Center; Buffalo, NY
January 28, 2027*; 6:00 p.m., ESPN+		Manhattan						Gallagher Center; Lewiston, NY
January 30, 2027*; 1:00 p.m., ESPN+		Saint Peter's						Gallagher Center; Lewiston, NY
February 4, 2027; 7:00 p.m., ESPN+		at Marist						McCann Arena; Poughkeepsie, NY
February 6, 2027*; 2:00 p.m., ESPN+		at Quinnipiac						M&T Bank Arena; Hamden, CT
February 11, 2027*; 6:00 p.m., ESPN+		Canisius; Rivalry						Gallagher Center; Lewiston, NY
February 13, 2027*; 1:00 p.m., ESPN+		Iona						Gallagher Center; Lewiston, NY
February 18, 2027; 11:00 a.m., ESPN+		at Merrimack						Lawler Arena; North Andover, MA
February 20, 2027; 2:00 p.m., ESPN+		at Fairfield						Leo D. Mahoney Arena; Fairfield, CT
February 25, 2027*; 6:00 p.m., ESPN+		Rider						Gallagher Center; Lewiston, NY
February 27, 2027*; 1:00 p.m., ESPN+		Mount St. Mary's						Gallagher Center; Lewiston, NY
*Non-conference game. ^{#}Rankings from AP Poll. (#) Tournament seedings in parentheses. All times are in Eastern.
