= 2026–27 Quinnipiac Bobcats women's basketball team =

American college basketball season

2026–27 Quinnipiac Bobcats women's basketball
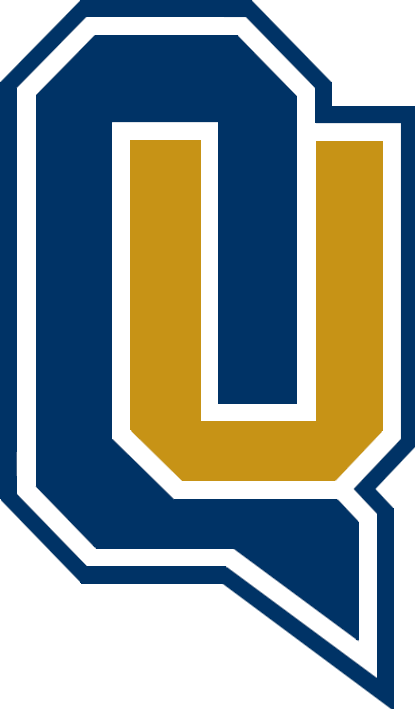
- Conference: Metro Conference
- Record: 0–0 (0–0 Metro)
- Head coach: Roman Owen (1st season)
- Associate head coach: Adam Call
- Assistant coaches: Kourtni Stevenson; Amaya West
- Home arena: M&T Bank Arena

2026–27 Metro Conference women's basketball standings
| | Conf. | | | | Overall |
| Team | W | | L | PCT | W | | L | PCT |
|---|---|---|---|---|---|---|---|---|
| Fairfield | 0 | – | 0 | – | 3 | – | 1 | .750 |
| Canisius | 0 | – | 0 | – | 2 | – | 2 | .500 |
| Iona | 0 | – | 0 | – | 2 | – | 3 | .400 |
| Manhattan | 0 | – | 0 | – | 2 | – | 3 | .400 |
| Quinnipiac | 0 | – | 0 | – | 2 | – | 3 | .400 |
| Siena | 0 | – | 0 | – | 2 | – | 3 | .400 |
| Rider | 0 | – | 0 | – | 1 | – | 2 | .333 |
| Sacred Heart | 0 | – | 0 | – | 1 | – | 3 | .250 |
| Marist | 0 | – | 0 | – | 1 | – | 4 | .200 |
| Saint Peter's | 0 | – | 0 | – | 0 | – | 3 | .000 |
| Merrimack | 0 | – | 0 | – | 0 | – | 4 | .000 |
| Mount St. Mary's | 0 | – | 0 | – | 0 | – | 5 | .000 |
| Niagara | 0 | – | 0 | – | 0 | – | 5 | .000 |
† 2027 Metro Conference tournament winner As of November 17, 2026

The 2026–27 Quinnipiac Bobcats women's basketball team will represent Quinnipiac University during the 2026–27 NCAA Division I women's basketball season. The Bobcats, led by first-year head coach Roman Owen, will play their home games at M&T Bank Arena in Hamden, Connecticut and compete as a member of the newly renamed Metro Conference.

== Previous season ==
The Bobcats finished the 2025–26 season 27–7 overall and 19–1 in MAAC play, to finish as regular season co-champions, sharing the title with Fairfield. Both teams' only regular season losses in the conference came from each other, with Quinnipiac losing to the Stags 63–75 at home in late January.

As the top seed in the MAAC tournament, they defeated No. 8 Manhattan in the quarterfinals, before narrowly avoiding an upset as they defeated No. 4 Iona 63–62 in overtime to advance to their second straight conference final. In a rematch of January's matchup, as well as last year's championship game, the Bobcats fell 44–51 to Fairfield.

As regular season champions who did not win their conference tournament, the Bobcats earned an automatic bid to the WBIT, their second straight appearance, where they were unseeded in the BYU Bracket. They defeated No. 3 seeded George Mason in the first round, before losing to No. 2 Stanford 69–81 in the second round to end their season.

On March 16, head coach Tricia Fabbri announced that she would be retiring from the program following the conclusion of the season after thirty one years. Fabbri retired as the winningest coach in program history, with 572 wins across her tenure. On April 7, UNLV associate head coach Roman Owen was announced as the program's new head coach. Owen spent six years with the Lady Rebels, and helped lead the team to three consecutive NCAA tournament appearances from 2022 to 2024.

== Offseason ==
=== Departures ===
Quinnipiac departures
| Name | Number | Pos. | Height | Year | Hometown | Reason for departure |
|---|---|---|---|---|---|---|
| Ella Ryan | 2 | Guard | 5'8" | Freshman | Brentwood, TN | Transferred to Arizona State |
| Aniyah Neal | 3 | Guard | 5'11" | Freshman | Syracuse, NY | Transferred to Saint Peter's |
| Ella O'Donnell | 12 | Forward | 6'3" | Senior | Shankill, Ireland | Graduated |
| Emma Lizotte | 14 | Forward | 6'3" | Sophomore | Saco, ME | Transferred to Holy Cross |
| Karson Martin | 15 | Guard | 5'7" | Junior | Woodstock, GA | Transferred to Tennessee Tech |
| Sydney Ryan | 20 | Guard | 5'10" | Senior | Brentwood, TN | Graduated |
| Jackie Grisdale | 21 | Guard | 5'9" | Graduate Student | Poland, OH | Graduated |
| Reagan Sipia | 22 | Guard | 6'1" | Sophomore | St. Charles, IL | Transferred to IU Indy |
| Anna Foley | 23 | Forward/Center | 6'3" | Junior | Andover, MA | Transferred to Villanova |

=== Incoming transfers ===
Quinnipiac incoming transfers
| Name | Number | Pos. | Height | Year | Hometown | Previous school |
|---|---|---|---|---|---|---|
| Lilly Thomas | 0 | Center | 6'1" | Sophomore | El Reno, OK | Missouri Southern State (D-II) |
| Leila Washington | 1 | Forward | 5'10" | Junior | Garber, OK | Cloud County CC (NJCAA) |
| Kayla Hopson | 2 | Guard | 5'8" | Junior | Harlem, NY | Gulf Coast State (NJCAA) |
| Payton Dulin | 3 | Guard | 5'9" | Sophomore | Baldwin, NY | George Washington |
| Ana Ramos Pires | 8 | Forward | 6'2" | Senior | São Paulo, Brazil | Georgia State (Note: Did not play in the 2025–26 season.) |
| Elle Snyder | 15 | Guard/Forward | 5'9" | Junior | Latrobe, PA | Evansville |

=== Recruiting class ===
There was no 2026 recruiting class.

== Roster ==
Years are listed according to the new NCAA age-based eligibility model.

2026–27 Quinnipiac Bobcats women's basketball team
Players
Coaches

| Pos. | # | Name | Height | Year | Previous school | Hometown |
|---|---|---|---|---|---|---|
| C | 0 | Lilly Thomas | 6 ft 1 in (1.85 m) | So | El Reno High School; Missouri Southern State | El Reno, OK |
| F | 1 | Leila Washington | 5 ft 10 in (1.78 m) | Jr | Garber High School; Cloud County CC | Garber, OK |
| G | 2 | Kayla Hopson | 5 ft 8 in (1.73 m) | Jr | South Shore High School; Gulf Coast State College | Harlem, NY |
| G | 3 | Payton Dulin | 5 ft 9 in (1.75 m) | So | Baldwin High School; George Washington | Baldwin, NY |
| G | 4 | Ava Thomas | 5 ft 9 in (1.75 m) | Fr | The Mary Louis Academy | Queens, NY |
| G | 5 | Paige Girardi | 5 ft 9 in (1.75 m) | Sr | Warwick Valley High School | Warwick, NY |
| G | 7 | Alanna Benoit | 5 ft 9 in (1.75 m) | Fr | Mandeville High School | Mandeville, LA |
| F | 8 | Ana Ramos Pires | 6 ft 2 in (1.88 m) | Sr | Colegio Campos Salles; Georgia State | São Paulo, Brazil |
| G | 10 | Maria Kealy | 5 ft 9 in (1.75 m) | Sr | Loreto Letterkenny | Donegal, Ireland |
| G | 11 | Imani Mullings | 5 ft 6 in (1.68 m) | Fr | Plainfield High School | Plainfield, NJ |
| F | 12 | Mya Alston | 6 ft 1 in (1.85 m) | Fr | Mustang High School | Mustang, OK |
| G/F | 12 | Elle Snyder | 5 ft 9 in (1.75 m) | Sr | Greater Latrobe High School; Evansville | Latrobe, PA |
| G | 24 | Ava Sollenne | 5 ft 6 in (1.68 m) | Sr | St. Luke's School | Greenwich, CT |
| F | 77 | Uliana Doronina | 6 ft 1 in (1.85 m) | Fr | Hoosac School | Moscow, Russia |

Head coach

- Roman Owen (Southwestern Christian)

Assistant coach(es)

- Adam Call (Oklahoma)
- Kourtni Stevenson (Mid-America Christian)
- Amaya West (Nevada)

Legend

- (C) Team captain
- (S) Suspended
- (I) Ineligible
- (W) Walk-on
- Injured
- Current redshirt

Roster
Last update: September 7, 2026

== Schedule and results ==
| Date time, TV | Rank^{#} | Opponent^{#} | Result | Record | High points | High rebounds | High assists | Site (attendance) city, state |
Non-conference regular season
| November 2, 2026*; 6:30 p.m. | | St. Joseph's (Long Island) | | | | | | M&T Bank Arena; Hamden, CT |
| November 5, 2026*; TBA | | at Vermont; AE–Metro Challenge | | | | | | Patrick Gym; Burlington, VT |
| November 8, 2026*; 2:00 p.m. | | UMBC; AE–Metro Challenge | | | | | | M&T Bank Arena; Hamden, CT |
| November 11, 2026*; TBA | | at St. John's | | | | | | Carnesecca Arena; Queens, NY |
| November 14, 2026*; 2:00 p.m. | | Boston University | | | | | | M&T Bank Arena; Hamden, CT |
| November 16, 2026*; 6:30 p.m. | | Yale | | | | | | M&T Bank Arena; Hamden, CT |
| November 19, 2026*; TBA | | at Colgate | | | | | | Cotterell Court; Hamilton, NY |
| November 28, 2026*; TBA | | vs. Wake Forest; Arizona State Invitational | | | | | | Desert Financial Arena; Tempe, AZ |
| November 29, 2026*; TBA | | vs. Cal State Bakersfield; Arizona State Invitational | | | | | | Desert Financial Arena; Tempe, AZ |
| December 6, 2026*; TBA | | at Maine | | | | | | Memorial Gymnasium; Orono, ME |
| December 13, 2026*; 2:00 p.m. | | Boston College | | | | | | M&T Bank Arena; Hamden, CT |
Metro Conference regular season
| December 19, 2026; 2:00 p.m. | | Iona | | | | | | M&T Bank Arena; Hamden, CT |
| December 21, 2026; TBA | | at Siena | | | | | | UHY Center; Loudonville, NY |
| December 29, 2026; 6:30 p.m. | | Rider | | | | | | M&T Bank Arena; Hamden, CT |
| January 1, 2027; TBA | | at Saint Peter's | | | | | | Run Baby Run Arena; Jersey City, NJ |
| January 3, 2027; 2:00 p.m. | | Merrimack | | | | | | M&T Bank Arena; Hamden, CT |
| January 7, 2027; 6:30 p.m. | | Manhattan | | | | | | M&T Bank Arena; Hamden, CT |
| January 9, 2027; TBA | | at Marist | | | | | | McCann Arena; Poughkeepsie, NY |
| January 16, 2027; TBA | | at Niagara | | | | | | Gallagher Center; Lewiston, NY |
| January 18, 2027; 2:00 p.m. | | Sacred Heart | | | | | | M&T Bank Arena; Hamden, CT |
| January 21, 2027; TBA | | at Iona | | | | | | Hynes Athletic Center; New Rochelle, NY |
| January 23, 2027; TBA | | at Fairfield | | | | | | Leo D. Mahoney Arena; Fairfield, CT |
| January 28, 2027; 6:30 p.m. | | Siena | | | | | | M&T Bank Arena; Hamden, CT |
| January 30, 2027; TBA | | at Rider | | | | | | Canastra Hammer Arena; Lawrenceville, NJ |
| February 4, 2027; 6:30 p.m. | | Canisius | | | | | | M&T Bank Arena; Hamden, CT |
| February 6, 2027; 2:00 p.m. | | Niagara | | | | | | M&T Bank Arena; Hamden, CT |
| February 11, 2027; TBA | | at Manhattan | | | | | | Draddy Gymnasium; Riverdale, NY |
| February 13, 2027; 2:00 p.m. | | Fairfield | | | | | | M&T Bank Arena; Hamden, CT |
| February 20, 2027; TBA | | at Mount St. Mary's | | | | | | Knott Arena; Emmitsburg, MD |
| February 25, 2027; 6:30 p.m. | | Saint Peter's | | | | | | M&T Bank Arena; Hamden, CT |
| February 27, 2027; TBA | | at Merrimack | | | | | | Merrimack Athletics Complex; North Andover, MA |
*Non-conference game. ^{#}Rankings from AP Poll. (#) Tournament seedings in parentheses. All times are in Eastern.
