= DeSoto High School =

DeSoto High School can refer to:

- DeSoto High School (Texas), DeSoto, Texas
- De Soto High School (Kansas), De Soto, Kansas
- De Soto High School (Wisconsin), De Soto, Wisconsin
- De Soto High School (Missouri), De Soto, Missouri

== See also ==
- DeSoto Central High School, Southaven, Mississippi
- DeSoto County High School, Arcadia, Florida
- North DeSoto High School, Stonewall, Louisiana
