= Ridgewood High School =

Ridgewood High School may refer to:

- Ridgewood High School (New Jersey), Ridgewood, Bergen County, New Jersey
- Ridgewood High School (Florida), New Port Richey, Pasco County, Florida
- Ridgewood High School (Illinois), Norridge, Illinois
- Ridgewood High School (West Lafayette, Ohio), West Lafayette, Ohio
- Ridgewood High School, Wollaston, Wollaston, West Midlands, UK
