= Ben-Gurion (disambiguation) =

David Ben-Gurion (1886–1973) was the first Prime Minister of Israel.

Ben Gurion may also refer to:

== People with the surname or patronymic ==
- Nicodemus ben Gurion, a Biblical figure and wealthy Jew who lived in Jerusalem
- Joseph ben Gurion, a key leader during the first First Jewish–Roman War
- Paula Ben-Gurion (1892–1968), Russian-born wife of David Ben-Gurion

== Municipalities ==
- Ramot Ben Gurion, a neighborhood in the city of Haifa, Israel

== Places ==
- Ben Gurion Airport railway station, a station on the Israel Railways lines between Tel Aviv and Modi'in
- Ben Gurion Airport, the largest international airport in Israel
  - Ben-Gurion International Airport Garden, a garden outside Terminal 3 of Ben Gurion International Airport
- Ben Gurion High School, a high school in Petah Tikva, Israel
- Ben-Gurion House, an historic house museum in Tel Aviv, Israel
- Ben-Gurion National Solar Energy Center, the national alternative energy research institute of Israel
- Ben-Gurion University of the Negev, a university in Israel with the main campus located in Beersheba
- Kiryat Ben-Gurion, a complex of government buildings in the Givat Ram neighborhood of Jerusalem, Israel
- Midreshet Ben-Gurion, an educational center and boarding school in Sde Boker in the Negev, Israel

== See also ==
- Gurion
- Gorion, name variant
- Gurion Hyman (1925–2017), Jewish Canadian anthropologist, linguist, pharmacist, composer, artist, and translator
