= 2026–27 Saint Louis Billikens women's basketball team =

American college basketball season

2026–27 Saint Louis Billikens women's basketball
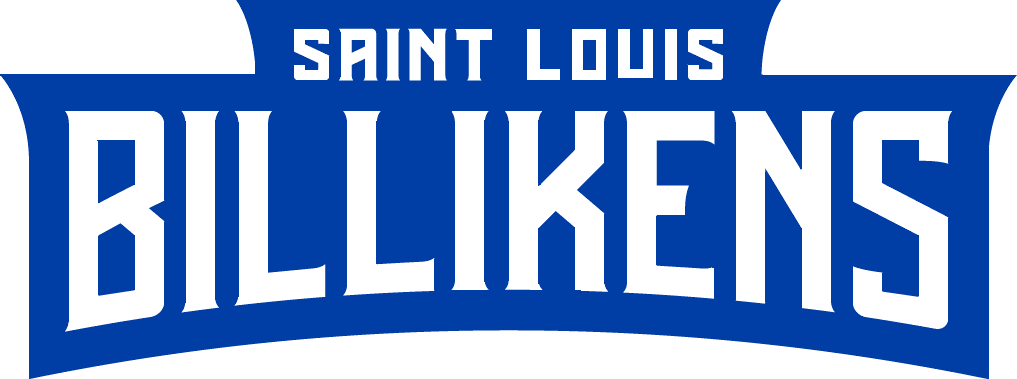
- Conference: Atlantic 10 Conference
- Record: 1–1 (0–0 A-10)
- Head coach: Rebecca Tillett (5th season)
- Associate head coach: Frozena Jerro
- Assistant coaches: Taylor Durham; Kyla McMakin; Madeline Sulka; Chyna Latimer
- Home arena: Chaifetz Arena

2026–27 Atlantic 10 women's basketball standings
	Conf.				Overall
Team	W		L	PCT	W		L	PCT
Saint Joseph's	0	–	0	–	3	–	0	1.000
Fordham	0	–	0	–	4	–	1	.800
Duquesne	0	–	0	–	3	–	1	.750
George Washington	0	–	0	–	3	–	1	.750
St. Bonaventure	0	–	0	–	2	–	1	.667
George Mason	0	–	0	–	3	–	2	.600
Richmond	0	–	0	–	3	–	2	.600
Loyola Chicago	0	–	0	–	2	–	2	.500
Saint Louis	0	–	0	–	2	–	2	.500
VCU	0	–	0	–	1	–	1	.500
Rhode Island	0	–	0	–	2	–	3	.400
Dayton	0	–	0	–	1	–	2	.333
La Salle	0	–	0	–	1	–	3	.250
Davidson	0	–	0	–	1	–	3	.250
† 2027 A10 tournament winner As of November 16, 2026

The 2026–27 Saint Louis Billikens women's basketball team currently represents Saint Louis University during the 2026–27 NCAA Division I women's basketball season. The Billikens, led by fifth-year head coach Rebecca Tillett, play their home games at Chaifetz Arena in St. Louis, Missouri, and compete as a member of the Atlantic 10 Conference.

== Previous season ==
The Billikens finished the 2025–26 season 12–21 overall and 5–13 in A-10 play, finishing eleventh in the conference. As the No. 11 seed in the A-10 tournament, they defeated No. 14 seed Fordham 68–60 in the first round, before falling in the second round 51–59 to No. 6 seed La Salle to end their season.

== Offseason ==
=== Departures ===
Saint Louis departures
Name	Num.	Pos.	Height	Year	Hometown	Reason for departure
Hannah Wallace	1	Guard	6'0"	Sophomore	St. Louis, MO	Transferred to Sam Houston
Ellie Paloueck	5	Guard	5'6"	Senior	St. Louis, MO	Graduated
Isabel Tillett	10	Guard	5'10"	Senior	Manassas, VA	Graduated
Alexia Nelson	13	Guard	5'8"	Graduate Student	Brooklyn, NY	Graduated
Marilena Triantafylli	15	Center	6'5"	Junior	Athens, Greece	TBD; not listed on roster
Zya Nugent	22	Guard	5'9"	Graduate Student	Denison, TX	Graduated
Zhykera Brown	35	Guard	5'10"	Freshman	Greenville, SC	Transferred to Chipola College (NJCAA)

=== Incoming transfers ===
Saint Louis incoming transfers
Name	Num.	Pos.	Height	Year	Hometown	Previous school
Tyonna Bailey	3	Guard	5'10"	Senior	Newark, NJ	Charleston Southern
D'Myjah Bolds	10	Forward	6'3"	Junior	O'Fallon, IL	Western Michigan
Gabby Spink	15	Guard	5'9"	(redshirt) Freshman	Haubstadt, IN	Murray State

=== Recruiting class ===
There was no 2026 recruiting class.

== Preseason ==
On October 19, 2026, the Atlantic 10 Conference released its annual preseason poll and honor awards. Saint Louis was picked to finish sixth in the conference.

=== Preseason rankings ===
Atlantic 10 Preseason Poll
Place	Team	Votes
1	Saint Joseph's	196 (14)
2	Davidson	181
3	George Washington	141
4	George Mason	138
5	Dayton	127
6	Saint Louis	123
7	VCU	106
8	Richmond	101
9	Rhode Island	97
10	La Salle	78
11	St. Bonaventure	59
12	Duquesne	51
13	Fordham	40
14	Loyola Chicago	32
(#) first-place votes

=== Preseason All-Conference Teams ===
Preseason All Conference Teams
Player	Year	Position	Team
Alyssa Koerkenmeier	Sophomore	Center	First

=== Preseason All-Conference Defensive Team ===
Preseason All Conference Defensive Team
Player	Year	Position
Alyssa Koerkenmeier	Sophomore	Center

== Roster ==
2026–27 Saint Louis Billikens women's basketball team
Players
Coaches

Pos.	#	Name	Height	Year	Previous school	Hometown
G	0	Jahda Denis	5 ft 7 in (1.7 m)	So	Capital Courts Academy	Montreal, Quebec
C	1	Naomi Ikpotokin	6 ft 3 in (1.91 m)	Fr	Capital Courts Academy	Portlaoise, Ireland
G	3	Tyonna Bailey	5 ft 10 in (1.78 m)	Sr	Immaculate Conception High School; St. John's	Newark, NJ
F	5	Evelyn Shane	6 ft 0 in (1.83 m)	Fr	Ursuline Academy	Chesterfield, MO
C	7	Jameela Jones	6 ft 5 in (1.96 m)	Fr	St. Mary's Ryken High School	Chaguanas, Trinidad and Tobago
F	10	D'Myjah Bolds	6 ft 3 in (1.91 m)	Jr	O'Fallon Township High School; Western Michigan	O'Fallon, IL
F	12	Jada Tiggett	6 ft 2 in (1.88 m)	Sr	Rancho Christian School; North Carolina Central	Winchester, CA
G	15	Gabby Spink	5 ft 9 in (1.75 m)	RS Fr	Gibson Southern High School; Murray State	Haubstadt, IN
G	20	Peyton Olufson	5 ft 8 in (1.73 m)	Fr	Incarnate Word Academy	Fairview Heights, IL
F	25	Jasaiyah Wallace	6 ft 1 in (1.85 m)	So	Centralia High School	Centralia, IL
G	33	Mia Bergstrom	5 ft 10 in (1.78 m)	Jr	St. Viator High School	Mount Prospect, IL
C	34	Alyssa Koerkenmeier	6 ft 6 in (1.98 m)	So	Mater Dei High School	Saint Rose, IL

Head coach

- Rebecca Tillett (William & Mary)

Assistant coach(es)

- Frozena Jerro (Arizona State)
- Taylor Durham (Navy)
- Kyla McMakin (Saint Louis)
- Madeline Sulka (Concordia Irvine
- Chyna Latimer (Ball State)

Legend

- (C) Team captain
- (S) Suspended
- (I) Ineligible
- (W) Walk-on
- Injured
- Current redshirt

Roster
Last update: October 28, 2026

== Schedule and results ==
Date time, TV	Rank^{#}	Opponent^{#}	Result	Record	High points	High rebounds	High assists	Site (attendance) city, state
Exhibition
October 15, 2026*; 7:00 p.m.		Kansas City	L 90–101		–	–	–	Chaifetz Arena; St. Louis, MO
October 20, 2026*; 6:00 p.m.		at SIU Edwardsville	W 68–63		–	–	–	Vadalabene Center; Edwardsville, IL
October 26, 2026*; 7:00 p.m.		Bradley	W 58–56		–	–	–	Chaifetz Arena; St. Louis, MO
Regular season
November 2, 2026*; 6:30 p.m., ESPN+		at Middle Tennessee	L 84–91 ^{OT}	0–1	29 – Bailey	7 – Bolds	5 – Denis	Murphy Center (2,657); Murfreesboro, TN
November 5, 2026*; 7:00 p.m., ESPN+		Milwaukee	W 81–62	1–1	25 – Bailey	7 – Koerkenmeier	6 – Davis	Chaifetz Arena (369); St. Louis, MO
November 11, 2026*; 4:00 p.m., ESPN+		Eastern Illinois						Chaifetz Arena; St. Louis, MO
November 14, 2026*; 1:00 p.m., ESPN+		Illinois State						Chaifetz Arena; St. Louis, MO
November 18, 2026*; 7:00 p.m., ESPN+		Missouri State						Chaifetz Arena; St. Louis, MO
November 21, 2026*; 6:00 p.m., ESPN+		Southeast Missouri State						Chaifetz Arena; St. Louis, MO
November 25, 2026*; 6:00 p.m., ESPN+		at Northern Iowa						McLeod Center; Cedar Falls, IA
November 27, 2026*; 2:00 p.m., ESPN+		at Drake; Drake Classic						Knapp Center; Des Moines, IA
November 28, 2026*; 5:00 p.m.		vs. Omaha; Drake Classic						Knapp Center; Des Moines, IA
December 2, 2026; 5:00 p.m., ESPN+		at St. Bonaventure						Reilly Center; St. Bonaventure, NY
December 5, 2026*; 2:00 p.m., ESPN+		Arkansas–Pine Bluff						Chaifetz Arena; St. Louis, MO
December 13, 2026*; 1:00 p.m., SECN+/ESPN+		at Missouri						Mizzou Arena; Columbia, MO
December 16, 2026*; 7:00 p.m., ESPN+		Ohio						Chaifetz Arena; St. Louis, MO
December 20, 2026*; 10:00 a.m.		vs. North Dakota State; West Palm Beach Classic						Rubin Arena; West Palm Beach, FL
December 21, 2026*; 2:30 p.m.		vs. San Diego State; West Palm Beach Classic						Rubin Arena; West Palm Beach, FL
January 2, 2027; 1:00 p.m., ESPN+		at Loyola Chicago						Joseph J. Gentile Arena; Chicago, IL
January 6, 2027; 7:00 p.m., ESPN+		George Mason						Chaifetz Arena; St. Louis, MO
January 9, 2027; 12:00 p.m., ESPN+		at Dayton						UD Arena; Dayton, OH
January 16, 2027; 6:00 p.m., ESPN+		Duquesne						Chaifetz Arena; St. Louis, MO
January 20, 2027; 10:00 a.m., ESPN+		at Rhode Island						Ryan Center; Kingston, RI
January 23, 2027; 6:00 p.m., ESPN+		George Washington						Chaifetz Arena; St. Louis, MO
January 27, 2027; 5:00 p.m., ESPN+		at Richmond						Robins Center; Richmond, VA
January 31, 2027; 1:00 p.m., ESPN+		at VCU						Siegel Center; Richmond, VA
February 3, 2027; 11:00 a.m., ESPN+		Rhode Island						Chaifetz Arena; St. Louis, MO
February 7, 2027; 11:00 a.m., CBSSN		at Davidson						John M. Belk Arena; Davidson, NC
February 10, 2027; 7:00 p.m., ESPN+		La Salle						Chaifetz Arena; St. Louis, MO
February 13, 2027; 2:00 p.m., ESPN+		at Fordham						Rose Hill Gymnasium; Bronx, NY
February 17, 2027; 7:00 p.m., ESPN+		Loyola Chicago						Chaifetz Arena; St. Louis, MO
February 20, 2027; 6:00 p.m., ESPN+		Davidson						Chaifetz Arena; St. Louis, MO
February 24, 2027; 6:00 p.m., ESPN+		at Saint Joseph's						Hagan Arena; Philadelphia, PA
February 27, 2027; 6:00 p.m., ESPN+		Dayton						Chaifetz Arena; St. Louis, MO
A-10 tournament
March 3–7, 2027; TBA		vs.						Henrico Sports & Events Center; Henrico, VA
*Non-conference game. ^{#}Rankings from AP Poll. (#) Tournament seedings in parentheses. All times are in Central.
