= 2026–27 Davidson Wildcats women's basketball team =

American college basketball season

2026–27 Davidson Wildcats women's basketball
- Conference: Atlantic 10 Conference
- Record: 3–3 (0–0 A-10)
- Head coach: Gayle Fulks (10th season)
- Associate head coach: James Janssen
- Assistant coaches: Laura Barry; Hannah Early Vaughn; Ryan Bauder; Dean Lockley
- Home arena: John M. Belk Arena

2026–27 Atlantic 10 women's basketball standings
	Conf.				Overall
Team	W		L	PCT	W		L	PCT
Duquesne	0	–	0	–	5	–	1	.833
St. Bonaventure	0	–	0	–	3	–	1	.750
Saint Joseph's	0	–	0	–	3	–	1	.750
Fordham	0	–	0	–	5	–	2	.714
George Washington	0	–	0	–	4	–	2	.667
Richmond	0	–	0	–	4	–	2	.667
George Mason	0	–	0	–	4	–	3	.571
Rhode Island	0	–	0	–	4	–	3	.571
Davidson	0	–	0	–	3	–	3	.500
La Salle	0	–	0	–	3	–	3	.500
Dayton	0	–	0	–	2	–	2	.500
VCU	0	–	0	–	2	–	2	.500
Loyola Chicago	0	–	0	–	2	–	4	.333
Saint Louis	0	–	0	–	2	–	4	.333
† 2027 A10 tournament winner As of November 22, 2026

The 2026–27 Davidson Wildcats women's basketball team will represent Davidson College during the 2026–27 NCAA Division I women's basketball season. The Wildcats, led by tenth-year head coach Gayle Fulks, will play their home games at the John M. Belk Arena in Davidson, North Carolina, and compete as a member of the Atlantic 10 Conference.

== Previous season ==
The Wildcats finished the 2025–26 season 21–12 overall and 12–6 in A-10 play, finishing fourth in the conference. As the No. 4 seed in the A-10 tournament, they defeated No. 5 Saint Joseph's 64–59 in the quarterfinals before falling in the semifinals to top-seeded Rhode Island 46–55 in the semifinals to end their season. Despite having 21 wins, they were not invited to any postseason tournaments.

On April 13, 2026, senior guard Charlise Dunn became the first ever player in program history to be selected in the WNBA draft, being drafted 36th overall by the Toronto Tempo in the third round.

== Offseason ==
=== Departures ===
Davidson departures
Name	Num.	Pos.	Height	Year	Hometown	Reason for departure
Angeliki Ziaka	11	Guard	5'9"	Sophomore	Athens, Greece	Transferred to UC Davis
Sienna Dauer	13	Guard	5'11"	Sophomore	Brandenton, FL	Transferred to UNC Wilmington
Candice Lienafa	17	Forward	5'11"	Sophomore	Ducos, Martinique	Transferred to Penn State
Charlise Dunn	21	Guard	6'2"	Senior	Vermont, Australia	Graduated, selected 36th overall by the Toronto Tempo in the 2026 WNBA draft
Edina Strausz	26	Center	6'3"	Sophomore	Budapest, Hungary	Transferred to Tulane
Stephanie Gutierrez-Rodriguez	33	Guard	5'6"	Sophomore	South Lake Tahoe, CA	TBD

=== Incoming transfers ===
Davidson incoming transfers
Name	Num.	Pos.	Height	Year	Hometown	Previous school
Georgia Ferguson	2	Forward	6'3"	Sophomore	Waterloo, ON	Evansville

=== Recruiting class ===
There was no 2026 recruiting class.

== Preseason ==
On October 19, 2026, the Atlantic 10 Conference released its annual preseason poll and honor awards. Davidson was picked to finish second in the conference.

=== Preseason rankings ===
Atlantic 10 Preseason Poll
Place	Team	Votes
1	Saint Joseph's	196 (14)
2	Davidson	181
3	George Washington	141
4	George Mason	138
5	Dayton	127
6	Saint Louis	123
7	VCU	106
8	Richmond	101
9	Rhode Island	97
10	La Salle	78
11	St. Bonaventure	59
12	Duquesne	51
13	Fordham	40
14	Loyola Chicago	32
(#) first-place votes

=== Preseason All-Conference Teams ===
Preseason All Conference Teams
Player	Year	Position	Team
Katie Donovan	Senior	Guard/Forward	First
Kyra Bruyndoncx	Junior	Guard	Third

=== Preseason All-Conference Defensive Team ===
No players were named to the Preseason All-Conference Defensive Team.

== Roster ==
2026–27 Davidson Wildcats women's basketball team
Players
Coaches

Pos.	#	Name	Height	Year	Previous school	Hometown
F	0	Eliza Buerk	6 ft 3 in (1.91 m)	Sr	Clackamas High School	Portland, OR
F	2	Georgia Ferguson	6 ft 3 in (1.91 m)	So	Cairine Wilson Secondary School; Evansville	Waterloo, ON
G	3	Jasmine Timmerson	5 ft 7 in (1.7 m)	Sr	North Allegheny High School; Pittsburgh	Wexford, PA
G	4	Elena Alvarez Castellanos	5 ft 6 in (1.68 m)	So	Colegio Miravalles-El Redin	Pamplona, Spain
G/F	7	Katie Donovan	5 ft 11 in (1.8 m)	Sr	Southport State High School	Gold Coast, Australia
F	10	Ines Garcia Monje	6 ft 2 in (1.88 m)	So	Instituto Joaquim Blume	Santa Cruz de Tenerife, Spain
G/F	11	Sharni Reisinger (W)	6 ft 0 in (1.83 m)	Fr	Brisbane State High School	Brisbane, Australia
G	14	Kyra Bruyndoncx	5 ft 11 in (1.8 m)	Jr	Topsportschool Antwerpen	Mol, Belgium
G	17	Sveva Bernasconi	6 ft 0 in (1.83 m)	Fr	Liceo Statale E. Fermi Cantù	Cantù, Italy
G	22	Sylvie Jackson	6 ft 0 in (1.83 m)	Sr	Louisa County High School	Zion Crossroads, VA
F	23	Asha Nightingale	6 ft 1 in (1.85 m)	So	Lavalla Catholic College	Melbourne, Australia
G/F	24	Lilli Onnela	6 ft 0 in (1.83 m)	Fr	Brändö Gymnasium	Helsinki, Finland
G	44	Emilie Bessell	5 ft 9 in (1.75 m)	Jr	Redlands College	Sydney, Australia

Head coach

- Gayle Fulks (Fairleigh Dickinson)

Assistant coach(es)

- James Janssen (Deakin)
- Laura Barry (North Carolina)
- Hannah Early Vaughn (Davidson)
- Ryan Bauder (Wake Forest)
- Dean Lockley (Radford)

Legend

- (C) Team captain
- (S) Suspended
- (I) Ineligible
- (W) Walk-on
- Injured
- Current redshirt

Roster
Last update: October 24, 2026

== Schedule and results ==
Date time, TV	Rank^{#}	Opponent^{#}	Result	Record	High points	High rebounds	High assists	Site (attendance) city, state
Exhibition
October 18, 2026*; 1:00 p.m.		at North Carolina	L 66–76		22 – Bruyndoncx	5 – Tied	2 – Ferguson	Carmichael Arena (890); Chapel Hill, NC
Regular season
November 2, 2026*; 11:00 a.m., ESPN+		at Columbia	L 65–71	0–1	22 – Donovan	7 – Donovan	7 – Alvarez Castellanos	Levien Gymnasium (2,732); New York, NY
November 5, 2026*; 7:00 p.m., ESPN+		Virginia	L 57–72	0–2	14 – Bruyndoncx	5 – Onnela	3 – Donovan	John M. Belk Arena (1,086); Davidson, NC
November 8, 2026*; 1:00 p.m., ESPN+		Campbell	W 80–43	1–2	19 – Donovan	9 – Bessell	4 – Tied	John M. Belk Arena (859); Davidson, NC
November 11, 2026*; 7:00 p.m., ESPN+		Appalachian State	L 67–71	1–3	22 – Donovan	5 – Tied	8 – Alvarez Castellanos	John M. Belk Arena (883); Davidson, NC
November 18, 2026*; 7:00 p.m., ESPN+		Charleston Southern	W 82–42	2–3	20 – Onnela	5 – Tied	5 – Bessell	John M. Belk Arena (1,038); Davidson, NC
November 21, 2026*; 7:00 p.m., ESPN+		Charlotte	W 63–44	3–3	16 – Onnela	7 – Garcia Monje	3 – Tied	John M. Belk Arena (1,051); Davidson, NC
November 24, 2026*; 1:00 p.m., ESPN+		vs. Notre Dame; Battle 4 Atlantis						Imperial Arena; Nassau, Bahamas
November 26, 2026*; 2:00 p.m., ESPNU		vs. Florida; Battle 4 Atlantis						Imperial Arena; Nassau, Bahamas
December 2, 2026; 6:00 p.m., ESPN+		at Fordham						Rose Hill Gymnasium; Bronx, NY
December 6, 2026*; 6:00 p.m., ACCN		at NC State						Reynolds Coliseum; Raleigh, NC
December 9, 2026*; 5:00 p.m., ESPN+		Vanderbilt						John M. Belk Arena; Davidson, NC
December 13, 2026*; 1:00 p.m., ESPN+		Radford						John M. Belk Arena; Davidson, NC
December 17, 2026*; 7:00 p.m., ESPN+		at Georgetown						McDonough Arena; Washington, D.C.
December 20, 2026*; 1:00 p.m., ESPN+		Mississippi State						John M. Belk Arena; Davidson, NC
December 22, 2026*; 1:00 p.m., ESPN+		at Ohio						Convocation Center; Athens, OH
December 30, 2026; 7:00 p.m., ESPN+		Loyola Chicago						John M. Belk Arena; Davidson, NC
January 3, 2027; 11:30 a.m., USA		at Dayton						UD Arena; Dayton, OH
January 6, 2027; TBA, ESPN+		Richmond						John M. Belk Arena; Davidson, NC
January 10, 2027; 12:00 p.m., CBSSN		at George Washington						Charles E. Smith Center; Washington, D.C.
January 13, 2027; 7:00 p.m., ESPN+		La Salle						John M. Belk Arena; Davidson, NC
January 17, 2027; 12:00 p.m., CBSSN		at Saint Joseph's						Hagan Arena; Philadelphia, PA
January 20, 2027; 7:00 p.m., ESPN+		at George Mason						EagleBank Arena; Fairfax, VA
January 23, 2027; 1:00 p.m., ESPN+		Rhode Island						John M. Belk Arena; Davidson, NC
January 31, 2027; 12:00 p.m., ESPNU		at Richmond						Robins Center; Richmond, VA
February 3, 2027; 7:00 p.m., ESPN+		Dayton						John M. Belk Arena; Davidson, NC
February 7, 2027; 12:00 p.m., CBSSN		Saint Louis						John M. Belk Arena; Davidson, NC
February 10, 2027; 11:00 a.m., ESPN+		at Duquesne						UPMC Cooper Fieldhouse; Pittsburgh, PA
February 14, 2027; 12:00 p.m., CBSSN		George Mason						John M. Belk Arena; Davidson, NC
February 17, 2027; 7:00 p.m., ESPN+		St. Bonaventure						John M. Belk Arena; Davidson, NC
February 17, 2027; 7:00 p.m., ESPN+		at Saint Louis						Chaifetz Arena; St. Louis, MO
February 24, 2027; 8:00 p.m., ESPN+		at Loyola Chicago						Joseph J. Gentile Arena; Chicago, IL
February 27, 2027; 1:00 p.m., ESPN+		VCU						John M. Belk Arena; Davidson, NC
A-10 tournament
March 3–7, 2027; TBA		vs.						Henrico Sports & Events Center; Henrico, VA
*Non-conference game. ^{#}Rankings from AP Poll. (#) Tournament seedings in parentheses. All times are in Eastern.
