= 2026–27 Duquesne Dukes women's basketball team =

American collegiate basketball season

2026–27 Duquesne Dukes women's basketball
- Conference: Atlantic 10 Conference
- Record: 0–1 (0–0 A-10)
- Head coach: Dan Burt (14th season)
- Assistant coaches: Brianna Thomas; Frank Ferraro; Rick Bell; RJ Bell; Michaela Porter
- Home arena: UPMC Cooper Fieldhouse

2026–27 Atlantic 10 women's basketball standings
	Conf.				Overall
Team	W		L	PCT	W		L	PCT
Fordham	0	–	0	–	1	–	0	1.000
George Mason	0	–	0	–	1	–	0	1.000
George Washington	0	–	0	–	1	–	0	1.000
Loyola Chicago	0	–	0	–	1	–	0	1.000
Richmond	0	–	0	–	1	–	0	1.000
St. Bonaventure	0	–	0	–	1	–	0	1.000
VCU	0	–	0	–	1	–	0	1.000
Dayton	0	–	0	–	0	–	0	–
Saint Joseph's	0	–	0	–	0	–	0	–
Davidson	0	–	0	–	0	–	1	.000
Duquesne	0	–	0	–	0	–	1	.000
La Salle	0	–	0	–	0	–	1	.000
Rhode Island	0	–	0	–	0	–	1	.000
Saint Louis	0	–	0	–	0	–	1	.000
† 2027 A10 tournament winner As of November 6, 2026

The 2026–27 Duquesne Dukes women's basketball team currently represents Duquesne University during the 2026–27 NCAA Division I women's basketball season. The Dukes, led by 14th-year head coach Dan Burt, play their home games at the UPMC Cooper Fieldhouse in Pittsburgh, Pennsylvania, and compete as a member of the Atlantic 10 Conference.

== Previous season ==
The Dukes finished the 2025–26 season 12–19 overall and 4–14 in A-10 play, finishing in a tie for twelfth in the conference with VCU. As the No. 12 seed in the A-10 tournament, they defeated the No. 13 seeded Rams 60–52 in the first round, before falling 45–66 in the second round to No. 5 seeded Saint Joseph's to end their season.

== Offseason ==
=== Departures ===
Duquesne departures
Name	Num.	Pos.	Height	Year	Hometown	Reason for departure
Harriet Ford	0	Forward	6'3"	Sophomore	Perth, Australia	Transferred to Richmond
Faith Walker	3	Guard	6'1"	Sophomore	York, PA	Transferred to Ball State
Fatou Sane	5	Guard	6'0"	Sophomore	Guédiawaye, Senegal	Transferred to Cleveland State
Reina Green	7	Guard	5'9"	Junior	Fort Lauderdale, FL	Transferred to St. John's
Mackenzie Blackford	11	Guard	5'8"	Sophomore	Solon, OH	Transferred to Robert Morris
Raymi Coueta	12	Guard	5'8"	Junior	Cayenne, French Guiana	Left team
Alexis Bordas	30	Guard	5'8"	Freshman	Wheeling, WV	Transferred to West Virginia

=== Incoming transfers ===
Duquesne incoming transfers
Name	Num.	Pos.	Height	Year	Hometown	Previous school
De'Naya Rippey	3	Forward	5'10"	Junior	Brooklyn, NY	Saint Peter's
Carla Viegas	8	Guard	5'9"	Senior	Malaga, Spain	Pittsburgh

=== Recruiting class ===
There was no 2026 recruiting class.

== Preseason ==
On October 19, 2026, the Atlantic 10 Conference released its preseason poll and honor awards. Duquesne was picked to finish twelfth in the conference.

=== Preseason rankings ===
Atlantic 10 Preseason Poll
Place	Team	Votes
1	Saint Joseph's	196 (14)
2	Davidson	181
3	George Washington	141
4	George Mason	138
5	Dayton	127
6	Saint Louis	123
7	VCU	106
8	Richmond	101
9	Rhode Island	97
10	La Salle	78
11	St. Bonaventure	59
12	Duquesne	51
13	Fordham	40
14	Loyola Chicago	32
(#) first-place votes

=== Preseason All-Conference Teams ===
No players were named to the Preseason All-Conference First, Second or Third Team.

=== Preseason All-Conference Defensive Team ===
No players were named to the Preseason All-Conference Defensive Team.

== Roster ==
2026–27 Duquesne Dukes women's basketball team
Players
Coaches

Pos.	#	Name	Height	Year	Previous school	Hometown
G	1	Ayala Oren	5 ft 6 in (1.68 m)	Fr	Ben Gurion High School	Ness Ziona, Israel
G	3	De'Naya Rippey	5 ft 10 in (1.78 m)	Jr	Cheshire Academy; Saint Peter's	Brooklyn, NY
G	5	Amaya Robinson	5 ft 6 in (1.68 m)	Fr	Royal Crown School	Ajax, ON
G	8	Carla Viegas	5 ft 9 in (1.75 m)	Sr	CAB Estepona; Pittsburgh	Málaga, Spain
G/F	9	Dunja Zecevic	6 ft 2 in (1.88 m)	Sr	Sportska Gimnazija; UTEP	Belgrade, Serbia
G	10	Gabby Grantham-Medley	5 ft 9 in (1.75 m)	RS Jr	North Hagerstown High School	Hagerstown, MD
G	13	Bakhaw Seye	6 ft 4 in (1.93 m)	Fr	SEED Academy	Dakar, Senegal
C	14	Maja Rohkohl	6 ft 4 in (1.93 m)	Jr	Greensboro Day School; Gardner–Webb	Hanover, Germany
C	16	Dieymarie Diouf	6 ft 6 in (1.98 m)	Fr	SEED Academy	Casamance, Senagal
G	20	Kellie McConnell	5 ft 3 in (1.6 m)	Jr	North Allegheny High School	Pittsburgh, PA
G	23	Nadia Moore	5 ft 10 in (1.78 m)	RS So	J. Addison School	Washington, PA
G	42	Dalma Grets	5 ft 10 in (1.78 m)	Fr		Dunaharaszti, Hungary
F	44	Raevin Washington	6 ft 5 in (1.96 m)	So	Turner Ashby High School	Harrisonburg, VA

Head coach

- Dan Burt (West Liberty)

Assistant coach(es)

- Brianna Thomas (Duquesne)
- Frank Ferraro (Duquesne)
- Rick Bell (Pittsburgh)
- RJ Bell (Geneva)
- Michaela Porter (Appalachian State)

Legend

- (C) Team captain
- (S) Suspended
- (I) Ineligible
- (W) Walk-on
- Injured
- Current redshirt

Roster
Last update: October 24, 2026

== Schedule and results ==
Date time, TV	Rank^{#}	Opponent^{#}	Result	Record	High points	High rebounds	High assists	Site (attendance) city, state
Regular season
November 2, 2026*; 6:30 p.m., SECN+		at Tennessee	L 62–109	0–1	24 – Viegas	9 – Oren	7 – Oren	Thompson–Boling Arena (9,662); Knoxville, TN
November 8, 2026*; 2:00 p.m., ESPN+		Clarion						UPMC Cooper Fieldhouse; Pittsburgh, PA
November 11, 2026*; 2:00 p.m., ESPN+		Marist						UPMC Cooper Fieldhouse; Pittsburgh, PA
November 14, 2026*; 1:00 p.m., ESPN+		at Kent State						MAC Center; Kent, OH
November 16, 2026*; 6:00 p.m., ESPN+		Robert Morris						UPMC Cooper Fieldhouse; Pittsburgh, PA
November 21, 2026*; 1:00 p.m., ESPN+		Stony Brook						UPMC Cooper Fieldhouse; Pittsburgh, PA
November 23, 2026*; 6:00 p.m., ESPN+		Canisius						UPMC Cooper Fieldhouse; Pittsburgh, PA
November 24, 2026*; 6:00 p.m., ESPN+		Niagara						UPMC Cooper Fieldhouse; Pittsburgh, PA
November 29, 2026*; 2:00 p.m., ESPN+		West Liberty						UPMC Cooper Fieldhouse; Pittsburgh, PA
December 2, 2026; 6:00 p.m., ESPN+		at George Washington						Charles E. Smith Center; Washington, D.C.
December 6, 2026*; 12:00 p.m., ESPN+		at Buffalo						Broadview Arena; Amherst, NY
December 9, 2026*; 6:00 p.m., ESPN+		Eastern Michigan						UPMC Cooper Fieldhouse; Pittsburgh, PA
December 13, 2026*; 2:00 p.m., ESPN+		Western Michigan						UPMC Cooper Fieldhouse; Pittsburgh, PA
December 17, 2026*; 6:00 p.m., ESPN+		at Akron						James A. Rhodes Arena; Akron, OH
December 20, 2026*; 12:00 p.m., ACCNX		at Pittsburgh; City Game						Petersen Events Center; Pittsburgh, PA
December 30, 2026; 6:00 p.m., ESPN+		at Richmond						Robins Center; Richmond, VA
January 2, 2027; 2:00 p.m., ESPN+		VCU						UPMC Cooper Fieldhouse; Pittsburgh, PA
January 6, 2027; 8:00 p.m., ESPN+		at Loyola Chicago						Joseph J. Gentile Arena; Chicago, IL
January 9, 2027; 2:00 p.m., ESPN+		Fordham						UPMC Cooper Fieldhouse; Pittsburgh, PA
January 13, 2027; 6:00 p.m., ESPN+		Saint Joseph's						UPMC Cooper Fieldhouse; Pittsburgh, PA
January 16, 2027; 7:00 p.m., ESPN+		at Saint Louis						Chaifetz Arena; St. Louis, MO
January 20, 2026; 6:00 p.m., ESPN+		Richmond						UPMC Cooper Fieldhouse; Pittsburgh, PA
January 24, 2027; 11:00 a.m., CBSSN		St. Bonaventure						UPMC Cooper Fieldhouse; Pittsburgh, PA
January 27, 2027; 7:00 p.m., ESPN+		at George Mason						EagleBank Arena; Fairfax, VA
January 31, 2027; 7:00 p.m., ESPN+		Dayton						UPMC Cooper Fieldhouse; Pittsburgh, PA
February 3, 2027; 6:30 p.m., ESPN+		at La Salle						John Glaser Arena; Philadelphia, PA
February 6, 2027; 2:00 p.m., ESPN+		at VCU						Siegel Center; Richmond, VA
February 10, 2027; 11:00 a.m., ESPN+		Davidson						UPMC Cooper Fieldhouse; Pittsburgh, PA
February 13, 2027; 2:00 p.m., ESPN+		Rhode Island						UPMC Cooper Fieldhouse; Pittsburgh, PA
February 20, 2027; 1:00 p.m., ESPN+		at Dayton						UD Arena; Dayton, OH
February 24, 2027; 6:00 p.m., ESPN+		at St. Bonaventure						Reilly Center; St. Bonaventure, NY
February 27, 2027; 2:00 p.m., ESPN+		Loyola Chicago						UPMC Cooper Fieldhouse; Pittsburgh, PA
A-10 tournament
March 3–7, 2027; TBA		vs.						Henrico Sports & Events Center; Henrico, VA
*Non-conference game. ^{#}Rankings from AP Poll. (#) Tournament seedings in parentheses. All times are in Eastern.
