= 2026–27 George Mason Patriots women's basketball team =

American college basketball season

2026–27 George Mason Patriots women's basketball
- Conference: Atlantic 10 Conference
- Record: 4–3 (0–0 A-10)
- Head coach: Vanessa Blair-Lewis (7th season)
- Associate head coach: Andre Bolton
- Assistant coaches: Brittany Ward; Debbie Taneyhill
- Home arena: EagleBank Arena

2026–27 Atlantic 10 women's basketball standings
	Conf.				Overall
Team	W		L	PCT	W		L	PCT
Duquesne	0	–	0	–	5	–	1	.833
St. Bonaventure	0	–	0	–	3	–	1	.750
Saint Joseph's	0	–	0	–	3	–	1	.750
Fordham	0	–	0	–	5	–	2	.714
George Washington	0	–	0	–	4	–	2	.667
Richmond	0	–	0	–	4	–	2	.667
George Mason	0	–	0	–	4	–	3	.571
Rhode Island	0	–	0	–	4	–	3	.571
Davidson	0	–	0	–	3	–	3	.500
La Salle	0	–	0	–	3	–	3	.500
Dayton	0	–	0	–	2	–	2	.500
VCU	0	–	0	–	2	–	2	.500
Loyola Chicago	0	–	0	–	2	–	4	.333
Saint Louis	0	–	0	–	2	–	4	.333
† 2027 A10 tournament winner As of November 22, 2026

The 2026–27 George Mason Patriots women's basketball team currently represents George Mason University during the 2026–27 NCAA Division I women's basketball season. The Patriots, led by seventh-year head coach Vanessa Blair-Lewis, will play their home games at EagleBank Arena in Fairfax, Virginia, and compete as a member of the Atlantic 10 Conference.

== Previous season ==
The Patriots finished the 2025–26 season 23–10 overall and a program-best 16–2 in A-10 play, finishing as regular season co-champions alongside Rhode Island.

Entering the A-10 tournament as the No. 2 seed and defending champions, they defeated No. 7 seed Dayton in the quarterfinals 87–85 in overtime at the buzzer, with guard Louis Volker scoring the game-winning go-ahead layup. They then advanced to the semifinals, defeating No. 3 Richmond 60–45 to once again advance to the championship game. They were unable to defend their title, as they fell 51–53 to top-seed Rhode Island to lose to the Rams for the second time of the season.

Following the tournament, the Patriots earned an automatic bid to the WBIT as a regular season champion who did not qualify for the NCAA tournament. They returned after making their first appearance in the inaugural tournament in 2024. They were seeded No. 3 in the BYU Bracket, and lost to unseeded Quinnipiac 64–71 in the first round to end their season.

== Offseason ==
=== Departures ===
George Mason departures
Name	Num.	Pos.	Height	Year	Hometown	Reason for departure
Saniyah Littlejohn	1	Guard	5'8"	Freshman	Philadelphia, PA	Transferred to Delaware
Zahirah Walton	2	Forward	5'11"	(redshirt) Junior	Seattle, WA	Transferred to West Virginia
Kennedy Harris	3	Guard	5'7"	Junior	Hampton, VA	Transferred to West Virginia
Matilde Motta	12	Guard	5'11"	Freshman	Saronno, Italy	Transferred to McNeese
Jada Brown	13	Guard	5'6"	Senior	Falls Church, VA	Graduated
MJ Johnson	14	Forward	6'3"	Graduate Student	Chicago, IL	Graduated
Louis Volker	15	Forward	6'1"	Junior	Purcellville, VA	Transferred to DePaul
Hawa Komara	22	Forward	6'2"	Graduate Student	Toulouse, France	Graduated
Leah Keyes	23	Forward	5'10"	Freshman	Stafford, VA	Transferred to UNC Wilmington
Sara Blair	30	Center	6'5"	Freshman	Fort Lauderdale, FL	Transferred to East Carolina
Page Greenburg	32	Guard	5'9"	(redshirt) Junior	Washington, D.C.	Transferred to Robert Morris

=== Incoming transfers ===
Dayton incoming transfers
Name	Num.	Pos.	Height	Year	Hometown	Previous school
Madison Bob	0	Guard	5'11"	Junior	Missouri City, TX	Kilgore College
Roisin Grandberry	1	Forward	6'4"	Junior	Arlington Heights, IL	Loyola Chicago
Desirae Ashton	2	Forward	6'0"	(redshirt) Sophomore	Fredericksburg, VA	Bucknell
Tia Dobson	3	Guard	5'7"	(redshirt) Sophomore	Daytona Beach, FL	UNC Wilmington
Anovia Sheals	4	Guard	5'11"	Junior	Daytona Beach, FL	Austin Peay
Lourdes Da Silva Costa	7	Forward	6'3"	Sophomore	Stockholm, Sweden	Alabama
Summer Yancy	13	G/F	5'11"	Junior	Kansas City, MO	UCF
Mary-Kate Tshibuabua	19	Forward	6'1"	(redshirt) Sophomore	Ternay, France	Rhode Island

=== Recruiting class ===
There was no 2026 recruiting class.

== Preseason ==
On October 19, 2026, the Atlantic 10 Conference released its annual preseason poll and honor awards. George Mason was picked to finish fourth in the conference.

=== Preseason rankings ===
Atlantic 10 Preseason Poll
Place	Team	Votes
1	Saint Joseph's	196 (14)
2	Davidson	181
3	George Washington	141
4	George Mason	138
5	Dayton	127
6	Saint Louis	123
7	VCU	106
8	Richmond	101
9	Rhode Island	97
10	La Salle	78
11	St. Bonaventure	59
12	Duquesne	51
13	Fordham	40
14	Loyola Chicago	32
(#) first-place votes

=== Preseason All-Conference Teams ===
Preseason All Conference Teams
Player	Year	Position	Team
Mary Amoateng	Sophomore	Guard	Second
Anovia Sheals	Junior	Guard	Third

=== Preseason All-Conference Defensive Team ===
Preseason All Conference Defensive Team
Player	Year	Position
Mary Amoateng	Sophomore	Guard

== Roster ==
2026–27 George Mason Patriots women's basketball team
Players
Coaches

Pos.	#	Name	Height	Year	Previous school	Hometown
G	0	Madison Bob	5 ft 11 in (1.8 m)	Jr	Hightower High School; Kilgore College	Missouri City, TX
F	1	Roisin Grandberry	6 ft 4 in (1.93 m)	Jr	Rolling Meadows High School; Loyola Chicago	Arlington Heights, IL
F	2	Desirae Ashton	6 ft 0 in (1.83 m)	RS So	Bishop Ireton High School; Bucknell	Fredericksburg, VA
G	3	Tia Dobson	5 ft 7 in (1.7 m)	RS So	Mainland High School; UNC Wilmington	Daytona Beach, FL
G	4	Anovia Sheals	5 ft 11 in (1.8 m)	Jr	Mainland High School; Austin Peay	Daytona Beach, FL
G	5	Kayla Johnson	5 ft 9 in (1.75 m)	So	Elizabeth Seton High School	Upper Marlboro, MD
F	7	Lourdes Da Silva Costa	6 ft 3 in (1.91 m)	So	Montverde Academy; Alabama	Stockholm, Sweden
G	8	Kailani Merrell	6 ft 0 in (1.83 m)	Fr	Spruce Creek High School	Daytona Beach, FL
F	10	Trinity Massenburg	6 ft 0 in (1.83 m)	RS Jr	Baltimore Polytechnic Institute	Baltimore, MD
G	11	Mary Amoateng	5 ft 8 in (1.73 m)	So	Bishop McNamara High School	Baltimore, MD
G/F	13	Summer Yancy	5 ft 11 in (1.8 m)	Jr	Lee's Summit North High School; UCF	Kansas City, MO
F	19	Mary-Kate Tshibuabua	6 ft 1 in (1.85 m)	RS So	École Acadomia; Rhode Island	Ternay, France
G	23	Irati Franco	6 ft 0 in (1.83 m)	Fr	AZ Compass Prep	Portugalete, Spain

Head coach

- Vanessa Blair-Lewis (Mount St. Mary's)

Assistant coach(es)

- Andre Bolton (Christopher Newport)
- Brittany Ford (Butler)
- Debbie Taneyhill (George Mason)

Legend

- (C) Team captain
- (S) Suspended
- (I) Ineligible
- (W) Walk-on
- Injured
- Current redshirt

Roster
Last update: October 26, 2026

== Schedule and results ==
Date time, TV	Rank^{#}	Opponent^{#}	Result	Record	High points	High rebounds	High assists	Site (attendance) city, state
Exhibition
October 24, 2026*; 2:00 p.m.		Mount St. Mary's	W 99–57		15 – Da Silva Costa	9 – Sheals	5 – Amoateng	EagleBank Arena (720); Fairfax, VA
Regular season
November 2, 2026*; 7:00 p.m., ESPN+		Temple	W 91–71	1–0	21 – Amoateng	9 – Yancy	4 – Amoateng	EagleBank Arena (2,757); Fairfax, VA
November 5, 2026*; 7:00 p.m., ESPN+		Akron	W 66–60	2–0	21 – Yancy	7 – Tied	4 – Amoateng	EagleBank Arena (835); Fairfax, VA
November 8, 2026*; 1:00 p.m., B1G+		at No. 20 Maryland	L 62–81	2–1	19 – Sheals	8 – Tshibuabua	3 – Amoateng	Xfinity Center (6,065); College Park, MD
November 11, 2026*; 6:00 p.m., ESPN+		at Army	L 75–80 ^{OT}	2–2	26 – Amoateng	8 – Sheals	4 – Amoateng	Christl Arena (973); West Point, NY
November 14, 2026*; 3:00 p.m., ESPN+		North Carolina Central						EagleBank Arena; Fairfax, VA
November 18, 2026*; 7:00 p.m.		at Princeton						Jadwin Gymnasium; Princeton, NJ
November 21, 2026*; 12:00 p.m., ESPN+		James Madison	W 55−52	4−3	15 – Sheals	8 – Tied	5 – Sheals	EagleBank Arena (1,182); Fairfax, VA
November 24, 2026*; 7:00 p.m., ESPN+		at Longwood						Joan Perry Brock Center; Farmville, VA
November 27, 2026*; 10:00 a.m.		vs. Vermont; Puerto Rico Clasico						Coliseo Rubén Rodríguez; Bayamón, PR
November 28, 2026*; 12:00 p.m.		vs. Providence; Puerto Rico Clasico						Coliseo Rubén Rodríguez; Bayamón, PR
December 2, 2026; 6:30 p.m., ESPN+		at La Salle						John Glaser Arena; Philadelphia, PA
December 5, 2026*; 4:00 p.m., ESPN+		at Liberty						Liberty Arena; Lynchburg, VA
December 7, 2026*; 6:00 p.m., ESPN+		at Navy						Alumni Hall; Annapolis, MD
December 16, 2026*; 7:00 p.m., ESPN+		at Florida Gulf Coast						Alico Arena; Fort Myers, FL
December 20, 2026*; 1:00 p.m., ESPN+		Maryland Eastern Shore						EagleBank Arena; Fairfax, VA
December 30, 2026; 12:00 p.m., ESPN+		Dayton						EagleBank Arena; Fairfax, VA
January 2, 2027; 3:00 p.m., ESPN+		Rhode Island						EagleBank Arena; Fairfax, VA
January 6, 2027; 8:00 p.m., ESPN+		at Saint Louis						Chaifetz Arena; St. Louis, MO
January 9, 2027; 3:00 p.m., ESPN+		St. Bonaventure						EagleBank Arena; Fairfax, VA
January 13, 2027; 6:00 p.m., ESPN+		at Richmond						Robins Center; Richmond, VA
January 16, 2027; 3:00 p.m., ESPN+		at Fordham						Rose Hill Gymnasium; Bronx, NY
January 20, 2027; 7:00 p.m., ESPN+		Davidson						EagleBank Arena; Fairfax, VA
January 23, 2027; 2:00 p.m., ESPN+		at Loyola Chicago						Joseph J. Gentile Arena; Chicago, IL
January 27, 2027; 7:00 p.m., ESPN+		Duquesne						EagleBank Arena; Fairfax, VA
January 31, 2027; 12:00 p.m., CBSSN		at Rhode Island						Ryan Center; Kingston, RI
February 3, 2027; 7:00 p.m., ESPN+		VCU; Rivalry						EagleBank Arena; Fairfax, VA
February 7, 2027; 2:00 p.m., ESPNU		George Washington; Revolutionary Rivalry						EagleBank Arena; Fairfax, VA
February 10, 2027; 7:00 p.m., ESPN+		Fordham						EagleBank Arena; Fairfax, VA
February 14, 2027; 12:00 p.m., CBSSN		at Davidson						John M. Belk Arena; Davidson, NC
February 20, 2027; 2:00 p.m., ESPN+		at George Washington; Revolutionary Rivalry						Charles E. Smith Center; Washington, D.C.
February 24, 2027; 6:00 p.m., ESPN+		at VCU; Rivalry						Siegel Center; Richmond, VA
February 27, 2027; 3:00 p.m., ESPN+		Saint Joseph's						EagleBank Arena; Fairfax, VA
A-10 tournament
March 3–7, 2027; TBA		vs.						Henrico Sports & Events Center; Henrico, VA
*Non-conference game. ^{#}Rankings from AP Poll. (#) Tournament seedings in parentheses. All times are in Eastern.
