= 2026–27 Richmond Spiders women's basketball team =

Intercollegiate basketball season

2026–27 Richmond Spiders women's basketball
- Conference: Atlantic 10 Conference
- Record: 5–2 ( A-10)
- Head coach: Alisa Kresge (1st season)
- Associate head coach: Will Lanier; Sacha Santimano
- Assistant coaches: Sam Brenner; Shenita Landry; Nevena Markovic-Gavric
- Home arena: Robins Center

2026–27 Atlantic 10 women's basketball standings
	Conf.				Overall
Team	W		L	PCT	W		L	PCT
Duquesne	0	–	0	–	5	–	1	.833
St. Bonaventure	0	–	0	–	3	–	1	.750
Saint Joseph's	0	–	0	–	3	–	1	.750
Fordham	0	–	0	–	5	–	2	.714
George Washington	0	–	0	–	4	–	2	.667
Richmond	0	–	0	–	4	–	2	.667
George Mason	0	–	0	–	4	–	3	.571
Rhode Island	0	–	0	–	4	–	3	.571
Davidson	0	–	0	–	3	–	3	.500
La Salle	0	–	0	–	3	–	3	.500
Dayton	0	–	0	–	2	–	2	.500
VCU	0	–	0	–	2	–	2	.500
Loyola Chicago	0	–	0	–	2	–	4	.333
Saint Louis	0	–	0	–	2	–	4	.333
† 2027 A10 tournament winner As of November 22, 2026

The 2026–27 Richmond Spiders women's basketball team will represent the University of Richmond during the 2026–27 NCAA Division I women's basketball season. The Spiders, led by first-year head coach Alisa Kresge, will play their home games at the Robins Center in Richmond, Virginia, and compete as a member of the Atlantic 10 Conference (A-10).

== Previous season ==
The Spiders finished the 2025–26 season 26–8 overall and 15–3 in A-10 play, finishing third in the conference. As the No. 3 seed in the A-10 women's tournament, they earned a bye to the quarterfinals, routing No. 6 seed La Salle 70–51 before falling to No. 2 seed George Mason 45–60 in the semifinals.

Following the tournament, the Spiders earned an at-large bid to the NCAA tournament, become the only mid-major program to do so. They were seeded No. 16 in the Sacramento #2 Regional, placing them into the First Four. They were unable to advance to the field of 64, as they lost 56–75 to Nebraska.

After the conclusion of the season, Richmond head coach Aaron Roussell accepted an offer to hold the same position at Virginia, and the Spiders hired Vermont head coach Alisa Kresge to replace Roussell.

== Offseason ==
=== Departures ===
Richmond departures
Name	Num.	Pos.	Height	Year	Hometown	Reason for departure
Tierra Simon	0	Forward	6'1"	Graduate Student	Houston, TX	Graduated
Alicia Newell	3	Guard	5'9"	Sophomore	Clinton, MD	Transferred to George Washington
Jada Green	8	Forward	6'1"	(redshirt) Senior	Fort Lauderdale, FL	Graduate transferred to Radford
Sam Dewey	13	Forward	6'2"	Senior	Melrose, MA	Graduated
Rachael Ullstrom	22	Guard	6'1"	Senior	Auburn, MA	Graduated
Annika Manthy	24	Forward	6'3"	Sophomore	Arlington Heights, IL	Transferred to Akron
Skylah Travis	25	Forward	6'1"	Graduate Student	Weldon, NC	Graduated
Maggie Doogan	44	Forward	6'2"	Senior	Broomall, PA	Graduated, signed a training camp contract with the WNBA's Phoenix Mercury

=== Incoming transfers ===
Richmond incoming transfers
Name	Num.	Pos.	Height	Year	Hometown	Previous school
Harriet Ford	0	Forward	6'3"	Junior	Perth, Australia	Duquesne

=== Recruiting classes ===
There was no 2026 recruiting class.

== Preseason ==
On October 19, 2026, the Atlantic 10 Conference released its annual preseason poll and honor awards. Richmond was picked to finish eighth in the conference.

=== Preseason rankings ===
Atlantic 10 Preseason Poll
Place	Team	Votes
1	Saint Joseph's	196 (14)
2	Davidson	181
3	George Washington	141
4	George Mason	138
5	Dayton	127
6	Saint Louis	123
7	VCU	106
8	Richmond	101
9	Rhode Island	97
10	La Salle	78
11	St. Bonaventure	59
12	Duquesne	51
13	Fordham	40
14	Loyola Chicago	32
(#) first-place votes

=== Preseason All-Conference Teams ===
Preseason All Conference Teams
Player	Year	Position	Team
Ally Sweeney	Senior	Guard	First

=== Preseason All-Conference Defensive Team ===
No players were named to the Preseason All-Conference Defensive Team.

== Roster ==
2026–27 Richmond Spiders women's basketball team
Players
Coaches

Pos.	#	Name	Height	Year	Previous school	Hometown
C	0	Harriet Ford	6 ft 3 in (1.91 m)	Jr	Kennedy Baptist College; Duquesne	Perth, Australia
G	1	Rayne Wright	6 ft 0 in (1.83 m)	So	Manchester High School	Midlothian, VA
G	4	Ava Persichetti	5 ft 10 in (1.78 m)	So	River Valley High School	Blairsville, PA
G	5	Emma Schoen	5 ft 7 in (1.7 m)	Fr	Silver Creek High School	Sellersburg, IN
F	6	Arisa Ihara	6 ft 0 in (1.83 m)	Fr	Japan Aviation High School Hokkaido	Meerbusch, Germany
F	9	Hanna Tjernberg	6 ft 3 in (1.91 m)	Fr	RIG Lulea Elite Academy	Stockholm, Sweden
F	10	Alexandra Vandiver	6 ft 1 in (1.85 m)	Fr	St. Mary's High School	Annapolis, MD
G	11	Kate Schindler	6 ft 0 in (1.83 m)	Fr	Marvin Ridge High School	Waxhaw, NC
G	12	Aneisha Scott	5 ft 5 in (1.65 m)	So	DeLaSalle High School	Minneapolis, MN
G	14	Ally Sweeney	5 ft 6 in (1.68 m)	Sr	Sparta High School	Sparta, NJ
G	15	Payton Richard	6 ft 0 in (1.83 m)	Jr	Rivers School	Bolton, MA
F	21	Shaneka Campbell	6 ft 2 in (1.88 m)	So	Harry S. Truman High School	The Bronx, NY
G	22	Bridget Rifenburg	6 ft 0 in (1.83 m)	Fr	Benet Academy	Downers Grove, IL
F	32	Josie Fontana	6 ft 3 in (1.91 m)	Fr	Oakland Catholic High School	Pittsburgh, PA

Head coach

- Alisa Kresge (Marist)

Assistant coach(es)

- Will Lanier (Georgia Tech)
- Sacha Santimano (Dakota State)
- Sam Brenner (Adelphi)
- Shenita Landry (Temple)
- Nevena Markovic-Gavric (IU Indianapolis)

Legend

- (C) Team captain
- (S) Suspended
- (I) Ineligible
- (W) Walk-on
- Injured
- Current redshirt

Roster
Last update: October 10, 2026

== Schedule and results ==
Date time, TV	Rank^{#}	Opponent^{#}	Result	Record	High points	High rebounds	High assists	Site (attendance) city, state
Regular season
November 2, 2026*; 7:00 p.m., ESPN+		at Charlotte	W 83–71	1–0	30 – Scott	8 – Fontana	5 – Scott	Halton Arena (962); Charlotte, NC
November 6, 2026*; 6:00 p.m., ESPN+		Princeton	L 57–65	1–1	17 – Sweeney	8 – Tied	3 – Tied	Robins Center; Richmond, VA
November 8, 2026*; 2:30 p.m., ESPN+		Rice	L 60–73 ^{OT}	1–2	19 – Scott	12 – Fontana	4 – Scott	Robins Center (1,101); Richmond, VA
November 12, 2026*; 6:00 p.m., ESPN+		Old Dominion	W 90–67	2–2	20 – Persichetti	5 – Tied	5 – Tied	Robins Center (1,030); Richmond, VA
November 15, 2026*; 2:00 p.m., ESPN+		William & Mary	W 72–48	3–2	18 – Tied	11 – Fontana	5 – Sweeney	Robins Center (1,097); Richmond, VA
November 19, 2026*; 7:00 p.m., ESPN+		at Delaware	W 77–68	4–2	21 – Sweeney	10 – Ihara	6 – Sweeney	Bob Carpenter Center (780); Newark, DE
November 22, 2026*; 2:00 p.m., ESPN+		Holy Cross	W 81–69	5–2	30 – Scott	8 – Ihara	4 – Tied	Robins Center (975); Richmond, VA
November 27, 2026*; 2:30 p.m., ESPN+		vs. St. John's; 4 Tha Culture Holiday Classic						Henrico Sports & Events Center; Henrico, VA
November 28, 2026*; 5:00 p.m., ESPN+		vs. Coppin State; 4 Tha Culture Holiday Classic						Henrico Sports & Events Center; Henrico, VA
December 2, 2026; 8:00 p.m., ESPN+		at Loyola Chicago						Gentile Arena; Chicago, IL
December 6, 2026*; 2:00 p.m., ESPN+		UNC Greensboro						Robins Center; Richmond, VA
December 13, 2026*; 2:00 p.m., ESPN+		Liberty						Robins Center; Richmond, VA
December 20, 2026* noon, ESPN+		at Charleston						TD Arena; Charleston, SC
December 22, 2026*; 11:00 a.m., ESPN+		Campbell						Robins Center; Richmond, VA
December 30, 2026; 6:00 p.m., ESPN+		Duquesne						Robins Center; Richmond, VA
January 2, 2027; 1:00 p.m., ESPN+		at St. Bonaventure						Reilly Center; St. Bonaventure, NY
January 6, 2027; 11:00 a.m., ESPN+		at Davidson						Belk Arena; Davidson, NC
January 10, 2027; 2:00 p.m., CBSSN		Saint Joseph's						Robins Center; Richmond, VA
January 13, 2027; 6:00 p.m., ESPN+		George Mason						Robins Center; Richmond, VA
January 17, 2027; 2:00 p.m., ESPN+/MASN		VCU; Capital City Classic						Robins Center; Richmond, VA
January 20, 2027; 6:00 p.m., ESPN+		at Duquesne						UPMC Cooper Fieldhouse; Pittsburgh, PA
January 23, 2027; 3:00 p.m., ESPN+		at Fordham						Rose Hill Gymnasium; New York, NY
January 27, 2027; 6:00 p.m., ESPN+		Saint Louis						Robins Center; Richmond VA
January 31, 2027 noon, ESPNU		Davidson						Robins Center; Richmond, VA
February 6, 2027; 2:00 p.m., ESPN+		St. Bonaventure						Robins Center; Richmond, VA
February 10, 2027; 6:00 p.m., ESPN+		at Rhode Island						Ryan Center; Kingston, RI
February 14, 2027 noon, USA		at VCU; Capital City Classic						Siegel Center; Richmond, VA
February 17, 2027; 6:00 p.m., ESPN+		Dayton						Robins Center; Richmond, VA
February 21, 2027; 2:00 p.m., USA		at Saint Joseph's						Hagan Arena; Philadelphia, PA
February 24, 2027; 6:30 p.m., ESPN+		at La Salle						John Glaser Arena; Philadelphia, PA
February 27, 2027; 2:00 p.m., ESPN+		George Washington						Robins Center; Richmond, VA
A-10 tournament
March 3–7, 2027; TBD		vs.						Henrico Sports & Events Center; Henrico, VA
*Non-conference game. ^{#}Rankings from AP Poll. (#) Tournament seedings in parentheses. All times are in Eastern.
