= 2026–27 Dayton Flyers women's basketball team =

American college basketball season

2026–27 Dayton Flyers women's basketball
- Conference: Atlantic 10 Conference
- Record: 0–0 (0–0 A-10)
- Head coach: Tamika Williams-Jeter (5th season)
- Assistant coaches: Bryce Agler; Darryl Hudson; Brittany Parker; Trendale Perkins; Tari Cummings-Baker
- Home arena: UD Arena

2026–27 Atlantic 10 women's basketball standings
	Conf.				Overall
Team	W		L	PCT	W		L	PCT
Davidson	0	–	0	–	0	–	0	–
Dayton	0	–	0	–	0	–	0	–
Duquesne	0	–	0	–	0	–	0	–
Fordham	0	–	0	–	0	–	0	–
George Mason	0	–	0	–	0	–	0	–
George Washington	0	–	0	–	0	–	0	–
La Salle	0	–	0	–	0	–	0	–
Loyola Chicago	0	–	0	–	0	–	0	–
Rhode Island	0	–	0	–	0	–	0	–
Richmond	0	–	0	–	0	–	0	–
Saint Joseph's	0	–	0	–	0	–	0	–
St. Bonaventure	0	–	0	–	0	–	0	–
Saint Louis	0	–	0	–	0	–	0	–
VCU	0	–	0	–	0	–	0	–
† 2027 A10 tournament winner

The 2026–27 Dayton Flyers women's basketball team will represent the University of Dayton during the 2026–27 NCAA Division I women's basketball season. The Flyers, led by fifth-year head coach Tamika Williams-Jeter, will play their home games at UD Arena in Dayton, Ohio, and compete as a member of the Atlantic 10 Conference.

== Previous season ==
The Flyers finished the 2025–26 season 17–14 overall and 9–9 in A-10 play, finishing in a tie for seventh in the conference with Loyola Chicago. As the No. 7 seed in the A-10 tournament, they defeated No. 10 seeded George Washington 62–54 in the second round, before being eliminated at the buzzer 85–87 in overtime to No. 2 seeded George Mason from a game-winning go-ahead layup by Patriots player Louis Volker to end their season.

== Offseason ==
=== Departures ===
Dayton departures
Name	Num.	Pos.	Height	Year	Hometown	Reason for departure
Maliyah Johnson	0	Guard	6'1"	Graduate Student	Columbus, OH	Graduated
Nayo Lear	1	Guard	5'10"	Senior	South Holland, IL	Graduated
Shantavia Dawkins	4	Guard	5'8"	Senior	Brampton, ON	Graduated
Nichole Stephens	21	Guard	5'7"	Graduate Student	Pickerington, OH	Graduated
Kamryn Grant	24	Guard	6'0"	Sophomore	Columbus, OH	Transferred to Florida A&M
Eleanor Monyek	42	Guard	6'0"	Senior	Clarendon Hills, IL	Graduated

=== Incoming transfers ===
Dayton incoming transfers
Name	Num.	Pos.	Height	Year	Hometown	Previous school
Cori Allen	1	Guard	5'10"	Senior	Nashville, TN	Memphis
Sophie Swanson	31	Guard	5'10"	Senior	Barrington, IL	Virginia Tech

=== Recruiting class ===
There was no 2026 recruiting class.

== Preseason ==
On October 19, 2026, the Atlantic 10 Conference released its preseason poll and honor awards. Dayton was picked to finish fifth in the conference.

=== Preseason rankings ===
Atlantic 10 Preseason Poll
Place	Team	Votes
1	Saint Joseph's	196 (14)
2	Davidson	181
3	George Washington	141
4	George Mason	138
5	Dayton	127
6	Saint Louis	123
7	VCU	106
8	Richmond	101
9	Rhode Island	97
10	La Salle	78
11	St. Bonaventure	59
12	Duquesne	51
13	Fordham	40
14	Loyola Chicago	32
(#) first-place votes

=== Preseason All-Conference Teams ===
Preseason All Conference Teams
Player	Year	Position	Team
Olivia Leung	Junior	Guard	Third

=== Preseason All-Conference Defensive Team ===
Preseason All Conference Defensive Team
Player	Year	Position
Fatima Ibrahim	Senior	Center

== Roster ==
2026–27 Dayton Flyers women's basketball team
Players
Coaches

Pos.	#	Name	Height	Year	Previous school	Hometown
G	1	Cori Allen	5 ft 10 in (1.78 m)	Sr	Montverde Academy; Memphis	Nashville, TN
F	3	London Johnson	6 ft 0 in (1.83 m)	Fr	Pickerington High School Central	Pickerington, OH
G	5	Jordyn Poole	5 ft 7 in (1.7 m)	Jr	Snider High School; Purdue	Fort Wayne, IN
G	7	Olivia Leung	5 ft 10 in (1.78 m)	Jr	Crestwood Prep	Calgary, AB
C	10	Fatima Ibrahim	6 ft 3 in (1.91 m)	Sr	Royal Crown School; North Dakota	Winnipeg, MB
G	12	Jayda Johnson	6 ft 1 in (1.85 m)	Sr	Hamden Hall Country Day School; Boston College	West Haven, CT
G/F	14	Ajok Madol	6 ft 3 in (1.91 m)	Sr	Archbishop M.C. O'Neill High School; Minnesota	Regina, SK
F	15	M.G. Talle	6 ft 2 in (1.88 m)	So	École secondaire Félix-Leclerc	Terrebonne, QC
F	22	Brooke McLeod	6 ft 2 in (1.88 m)	Fr	Crestwood Prep	Toronto, ON
G	25	Milee Smith	5 ft 10 in (1.78 m)	Fr	Unioto High School	Chillicothe, OH
G	31	Sophie Swanson	5 ft 10 in (1.78 m)	Sr	Barrington High School; Virginia Tech	Barrington, IL
F/C	35	Molly O'Riordan	6 ft 2 in (1.88 m)	Jr	Barrington High School	Barrington, IL

Head coach

- Tamika Williams-Jeter (Connecticut)

Assistant coach(es)

- Bryce Agler (Wittenberg)
- Darryl Hudson (Howard)
- Brittany Parker (St. Augustine's)
- Trendale Perkins (Ohio)
- Tari Cummings-Baker (Oklahoma State)

Legend

- (C) Team captain
- (S) Suspended
- (I) Ineligible
- (W) Walk-on
- Injured
- Current redshirt

Roster
Last update: October 24, 2026

== Schedule and results ==
Date time, TV	Rank^{#}	Opponent^{#}	Result	Record	High points	High rebounds	High assists	Site (attendance) city, state
Regular season
November 5, 2026*; 7:00 p.m., ESPN+		Illinois State						UD Arena; Dayton, OH
November 9, 2026*; 7:00 p.m., ESPN+		Penn State						UD Arena; Dayton, OH
November 15, 2026*; 1:00 p.m., ESPN+		Western Michigan						UD Arena; Dayton, OH
November 20, 2026*; 7:30 p.m., ESPN+		at Belmont						Curb Event Center; Nashville, TN
November 23, 2026*; 7:00 p.m., ESPN+		Xavier; Blackburn/McCafferty Trophy						UD Arena; Dayton, OH
November 27, 2026*; 5:00 p.m., ESPN+		vs. Florida State; 4 Tha Culture Holiday Hoops						Henrico Sports & Events Center; Henrico, VA
November 28, 2026*; 2:30 p.m., ESPN+		vs. St. John's; 4 Tha Culture Holiday Hoops						Henrico Sports & Events Center; Henrico, VA
December 2, 2026; 6:00 p.m., ESPN+		at VCU						Siegel Center; Richmond, VA
December 6, 2026*; 1:00 p.m., ESPN+		Mount St. Mary's						UD Arena; Dayton, OH
December 13, 2026*; 1:00 p.m., ESPN+		Delaware State						UD Arena; Dayton, OH
December 19, 2026*; 1:00 p.m., ESPN+		Purdue						UD Arena; Dayton, OH
December 22, 2026*; 7:00 p.m., ESPN+		Coppin State						UD Arena; Dayton, OH
December 30, 2026; 12:00 p.m., ESPN+		at George Mason						EagleBank Arena; Fairfax, VA
January 3, 2027; 11:30 a.m., USA		Davidson						UD Arena; Dayton, OH
January 6, 2027; 6:00 p.m., ESPN+		at Rhode Island						Ryan Center; Kingston, RI
January 9, 2027; 1:00 p.m., ESPN+		Saint Louis						UD Arena; Dayton, OH
January 17, 2027; 2:00 p.m., ESPN+		at Loyola Chicago						Joseph J. Gentile Arena; Chicago, IL
January 20, 2027; 7:00 p.m., ESPN+		La Salle						UD Arena; Dayton, OH
January 23, 2027; 1:00 p.m., ESPN+		Saint Joseph's						UD Arena; Dayton, OH
January 27, 2027; 7:00 p.m., ESPN+		George Washington						UD Arena; Dayton, OH
January 31, 2027; 7:00 p.m., ESPN+		at Duquesne						UPMC Cooper Fieldhouse; Pittsburgh, PA
February 3, 2027; 7:00 p.m., ESPN+		at Davidson						John M. Belk Arena; Davidson, NC
February 6, 2027; 1:00 p.m., ESPN+		Loyola Chicago						UD Arena; Dayton, OH
February 10, 2027; 11:00 a.m., ESPN+		VCU						UD Arena; Dayton, OH
February 14, 2027; 7:00 p.m., ESPN+		at St. Bonaventure						Reilly Center; St. Bonaventure, NY
February 17, 2027; 6:00 p.m., ESPN+		at Richmond						Robins Center; Richmond, VA
February 20, 2027; 1:00 p.m., ESPN+		Duquesne						UD Arena; Dayton, OH
February 24, 2027; 7:00 p.m., ESPN+		Fordham						UD Arena; Dayton, OH
February 27, 2027; 7:00 p.m., ESPN+		at Saint Louis						Chaifetz Arena; St. Louis, MO
A-10 tournament
March 3–7, 2027; TBA		vs.						Henrico Sports & Events Center; Henrico, VA
*Non-conference game. ^{#}Rankings from AP Poll. (#) Tournament seedings in parentheses. All times are in Eastern.
