= 2026–27 Saint Joseph's Hawks women's basketball team =

American college basketball season

2026–27 Saint Joseph's Hawks women's basketball
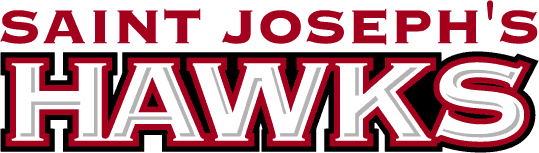
- Conference: Atlantic 10 Conference
- Record: 3–1 (0–0 A-10)
- Head coach: Cindy Griffin (26th season)
- Associate head coach: Melissa Dunne
- Assistant coaches: Ashley Prim; MyNeshia McKenzie; Megan Bauman; Alex Zachem
- Home arena: Hagan Arena

2026–27 Atlantic 10 women's basketball standings
	Conf.				Overall
Team	W		L	PCT	W		L	PCT
Fordham	0	–	0	–	5	–	1	.833
Duquesne	0	–	0	–	4	–	1	.800
Saint Joseph's	0	–	0	–	3	–	1	.750
St. Bonaventure	0	–	0	–	2	–	1	.667
VCU	0	–	0	–	2	–	1	.667
George Washington	0	–	0	–	3	–	2	.600
Richmond	0	–	0	–	3	–	2	.600
George Mason	0	–	0	–	3	–	3	.500
Rhode Island	0	–	0	–	3	–	3	.500
Davidson	0	–	0	–	2	–	3	.400
La Salle	0	–	0	–	2	–	3	.400
Loyola Chicago	0	–	0	–	2	–	3	.400
Saint Louis	0	–	0	–	2	–	3	.400
Dayton	0	–	0	–	1	–	2	.333
† 2027 A10 tournament winner As of November 19, 2026

The 2026–27 Saint Joseph's Hawks women's basketball team will represent Saint Joseph's University during the 2026–27 NCAA Division I women's basketball season. The Hawks, led by 26th-year head coach Cindy Griffin, will play their home games at Michael J. Hagan '85 Arena in Philadelphia, Pennsylvania, and compete as a member of the Atlantic 10 Conference.

== Previous season ==
The Hawks finished the 2025–26 season 20–11 overall and 10–8 in A-10 play, finishing in a tie for fifth in the conference with La Salle. As the No. 5 seed in the A-10 tournament, they routed No. 12 seed Duquesne 66–45 in the second round, before falling 59–64 to No. 4 Davidson in the quarterfinals to end their season.

== Offseason ==
=== Departures ===
Saint Joseph's departures
Name	Num.	Pos.	Height	Year	Hometown	Reason for departure
Faith Stinson	00	Forward	6'2"	Senior	Thornville, OH	Graduated
Meja Jägerskog	9	Forward	6'2"	Sophomore	Stockholm, Sweden	Transferred to Vermont
Kaylie Griffin	11	Guard	5'7"	Graduate Student	Conshohocken, PA	Graduated
Emirson Devenie	33	Guard	6'1"	Senior	Melbourne, Australia	Graduated

=== Incoming transfers ===
Saint Joseph's incoming transfers
Name	Num.	Pos.	Height	Year	Hometown	Previous school
Deja Evans	11	Forward	6'2"	Senior	Conshohocken, PA	Drexel
Maddy Potts	17	Guard	6'0"	Junior	Doncaster, Australia	Syracuse

=== Recruiting class ===
There was no 2026 recruiting class.

== Preseason ==
On October 19, 2026, the Atlantic 10 Conference released its annual preseason poll and honor awards. Saint Joseph's was unanimously picked to finish first in the conference, earning all fourteen first-place votes.

=== Preseason rankings ===
Atlantic 10 Preseason Poll
Place	Team	Votes
1	Saint Joseph's	196 (14)
2	Davidson	181
3	George Washington	141
4	George Mason	138
5	Dayton	127
6	Saint Louis	123
7	VCU	106
8	Richmond	101
9	Rhode Island	97
10	La Salle	78
11	St. Bonaventure	59
12	Duquesne	51
13	Fordham	40
14	Loyola Chicago	32
(#) first-place votes

=== Preseason All-Conference Teams ===
Preseason All Conference Teams
Player	Year	Position	Team
Gabby Casey	Senior	Guard	First
Aleah Sneed	Senior	Guard	Second
Rhian Stokes	Junior	Guard	Third

=== Preseason All-Conference Defensive Team ===
Preseason All Conference Defensive Team
Player	Year	Position
Aleah Sneed	Senior	Guard

== Roster ==
2026–27 Saint Joseph's Hawks women's basketball team
Players
Coaches

Pos.	#	Name	Height	Year	Previous school	Hometown
G	1	Rhian Stokes	5 ft 7 in (1.7 m)	Jr	Ewing High School	Ewing, NJ
G	2	Aleah Snead	5 ft 11 in (1.8 m)	Sr	William Penn Charter School	Philadelphia, PA
G	4	Addy Platt	5 ft 10 in (1.78 m)	Fr	Gill St. Bernard's School	Sparta, NJ
F	5	Jahzara Green	6 ft 1 in (1.85 m)	Fr	Gloucester Catholic High School	Lawnside, NJ
F	9	Ebba Jägre	6 ft 1 in (1.85 m)	Fr	Luleå gymnasieskola	Stockholm, Sweden
F	11	Deja Evans	6 ft 2 in (1.88 m)	Sr	Archbishop Wood Catholic High School; Drexel	Conshohocken, PA
G	15	Gabby Casey	5 ft 9 in (1.75 m)	Sr	Lansdale Catholic High School	Quakertown, PA
G	17	Maddy Potts	6 ft 0 in (1.83 m)	Jr	Templestowe College; Syracuse	Doncaster, Australia
F	19	Olivia Lutterodt	6 ft 2 in (1.88 m)	So	Allerød Gymnasium	Farum, Denmark
G	22	Kaylinn Bethea	5 ft 9 in (1.75 m)	So	William Penn Charter School	Voorhees, NJ
G	24	Jill Jekot	5 ft 11 in (1.8 m)	Jr	Cumberland Valley High School; Penn State	Enola, PA
F	25	Rian Dotsey	6 ft 2 in (1.88 m)	So	Haverford High School	Havertown, PA
G	30	Emily Knouse	5 ft 11 in (1.8 m)	Fr	Archbishop Wood Catholic High School	Horsham, PA
G	31	Lauren Greer	5 ft 6 in (1.68 m)	So	Archbishop Wood Catholic High School	Philadelphia, PA
F	32	Cecilia Kay	6 ft 2 in (1.88 m)	So	Bishop Fenwick High School; American	Melrose, MA

Head coach

- Cindy Griffin (Saint Joseph's)

Assistant coach(es)

- Melissa Dunne (Temple)
- Ashley Prim (Saint Joseph's)
- MyNeshia McKenzie (Rider)
- Megan Bauman (NYU)
- Alex Zachem (Saint Joseph's)

Legend

- (C) Team captain
- (S) Suspended
- (I) Ineligible
- (W) Walk-on
- Injured
- Current redshirt

Roster
Last update: October 27, 2026

== Schedule and results ==
Date time, TV	Rank^{#}	Opponent^{#}	Result	Record	High points	High rebounds	High assists	Site (attendance) city, state
Regular season
November 7, 2026*; 1:00 p.m., ESPN+		Kutztown	W 95–27	1–0	19 – Casey	8 – Green	4 – Tied	Hagan Arena (965); Philadelphia, PA
November 11, 2026*; 6:30 p.m., ESPN+		at Cincinnati	W 67–56	2–0	18 – Stokes	9 – Evans	5 – Snead	Fifth Third Arena (1,333); Cincinnati, OH
November 15, 2026*; 2:00 p.m., FloHoops		at Drexel; Big 5 Women's Classic Pod 1	W 61–56	3–0	18 – Casey	7 – Jekot	5 – Snead	Daskalakis Athletic Center (708); Philadelphia, PA
November 18, 2026*; 7:00 p.m., ESPN+		Penn; Big 5 Women's Classic Pod 1	L 58–65	3–1	17 – Potts	5 – Tied	6 – Casey	Hagan Arena (979); Philadelphia, PA
November 22, 2026*; 1:00 p.m., B1G+		at Penn State						Rec Hall; State College, PA
November 27, 2026*; 1:30 p.m., BDG Live		vs. USC; Baha Mar Hoops Nassau Championship						Baha Mar Convention Center; Nassau, Bahamas
November 29, 2026*; 11:00 a.m., BDG Live		vs. Illinois; Baha Mar Hoops Nassau Championship						Baha Mar Convention Center; Nassau, Bahamas
December 3, 2026; 7:00 p.m., ESPN+		Rhode Island						Hagan Arena; Philadelphia, PA
December 6, 2026; TBA		vs. TBD; Big 5 Women's Classic						Palestra; Philadelphia, PA
December 9, 2026*; 11:00 a.m., ESPN+		Columbia						Hagan Arena; Philadelphia, PA
December 20, 2026*; 12:00 p.m., ESPN+		Holy Cross; Hawk Classic opening round						Hagan Arena; Philadelphia, PA
December 21, 2026*; 1:00 p.m., ESPN+		Washington State or Liberty; Hawk Classic						Hagan Arena; Philadelphia, PA
December 30, 2026; 7:00 p.m., ESPN+		at Saint Louis						Chaifetz Arena; St. Louis, MO
January 3, 2027; 2:00 p.m., CBSSN		George Washington						Hagan Arena; Philadelphia, PA
January 6, 2027; 7:00 p.m., ESPN+		La Salle						Hagan Arena; Philadelphia, PA
January 10, 2027; 2:00 p.m., CBSSN		at Richmond						Robins Center; Richmond, VA
January 13, 2027; 6:00 p.m., ESPN+		at Duquesne						UPMC Cooper Fieldhouse; Pittsburgh, PA
January 17, 2027; 12:00 p.m., CBSSN		Davidson						Hagan Arena; Philadelphia, PA
January 20, 2027; 7:00 p.m., ESPN+		Fordham						Hagan Arena; Philadelphia, PA
January 23, 2027; 1:00 p.m., ESPN+		at Dayton						UD Arena; Dayton, OH
January 27, 2027; 6:00 p.m., ESPN+		at St. Bonaventure						Reilly Center; St. Bonaventure, NY
January 30, 2027; 2:00 p.m., ESPN+		Loyola Chicago						Hagan Arena; Philadelphia, PA
February 6, 2027; 2:00 p.m., ESPN+		at La Salle						John Glaser Arena; Philadelphia, PA
February 10, 2027; 7:00 p.m., ESPN+		St. Bonaventure						Hagan Arena; Philadelphia, PA
February 13, 2027; 2:00 p.m.		at George Washington						Charles E. Smith Center; Washington, D.C.
February 17, 2027; 11:00 a.m.		at VCU						Siegel Center; Richmond, VA
February 21, 2027; 2:00 p.m., USA		Richmond						Hagan Arena; Philadelphia, PA
February 24, 2027; 7:00 p.m., ESPN+		Saint Louis						Hagan Arena; Philadelphia, PA
February 27, 2027; 3:00 p.m., ESPN+		at George Mason						EagleBank Arena; Fairfax, VA
A-10 tournament
March 3–7, 2027; TBA		vs.						Henrico Sports & Events Center; Henrico, VA
*Non-conference game. ^{#}Rankings from AP Poll. (#) Tournament seedings in parentheses. All times are in Eastern.
