= 2026–27 La Salle Explorers women's basketball team =

American college basketball season

2026–27 La Salle Explorers women's basketball
- Conference: Atlantic 10 Conference
- Record: 0–1 (0–0 A-10)
- Head coach: Mountain MacGillivray (9th season)
- Associate head coach: Chris Day
- Assistant coaches: Tiffany Coll; Molly Masciantonio; Fiona Connolly
- Home arena: John Glaser Arena

2026–27 Atlantic 10 women's basketball standings
	Conf.				Overall
Team	W		L	PCT	W		L	PCT
Fordham	0	–	0	–	2	–	0	1.000
George Mason	0	–	0	–	2	–	0	1.000
Loyola Chicago	0	–	0	–	1	–	0	1.000
Richmond	0	–	0	–	1	–	0	1.000
St. Bonaventure	0	–	0	–	1	–	0	1.000
VCU	0	–	0	–	1	–	0	1.000
George Washington	0	–	0	–	1	–	1	.500
Saint Louis	0	–	0	–	1	–	1	.500
Saint Joseph's	0	–	0	–	0	–	0	–
Dayton	0	–	0	–	0	–	1	.000
Duquesne	0	–	0	–	0	–	1	.000
La Salle	0	–	0	–	0	–	1	.000
Rhode Island	0	–	0	–	0	–	1	.000
Davidson	0	–	0	–	0	–	2	.000
† 2027 A10 tournament winner As of November 6, 2026

The 2026–27 La Salle Explorers women's basketball team will represent La Salle University during the 2026–27 NCAA Division I women's basketball season. The Explorers, led by ninth-year head coach Mountain MacGillivray, will play their home games at John Glaser Arena in Philadelphia, Pennsylvania, and compete as a member of the Atlantic 10 Conference.

== Previous season ==
The Explorers finished the 2025–26 season 19–14 overall and 10–8 in A-10 play, finishing in a tie for fifth in the conference with Saint Joseph's. As the No. 6 seed in the A-10 tournament, they defeated No. 11 seed Saint Louis 59–51 in the second round, before falling to No. 3 Richmond 51–70 in the quarterfinals.

Following the tournament, the Explorers earned and accepted an at-large bid to the WNIT, making it their first ever appearance in the tournament, and their first postseason appearance since 1992. They earned a first round bye, before defeating Binghamton 61–70 in the second round to advance to the Super 16, where they lost 63–74 to Army to end their season.

== Offseason ==
=== Departures ===
La Salle departures
Name	Num.	Pos.	Height	Year	Hometown	Reason for departure
Aryss Macktoon	0	Guard	5'11"	(redshirt) Sophomore	Baltimore, MD	Transferred to Mississippi State
Diora Ressaissi	8	Guard/Forward	6'0"	Sophomore	Orlando, FL	Transferred to St. Thomas (NAIA)
Ivona Miljanic	10	Guard	6'0"	Senior	Belgrade, Serbia	Graduated
Sania Jenkins	11	Guard	5'11"	Sophomore	Narrabeen, Australia	Stepped away from team
India Webb	12	Guard	5'7"	Freshman	Philadelphia, PA	TBD; not listed on roster
Ashleigh Connor	15	Guard	5'11"	(redshirt) Junior	Pittsburgh, PA	Transferred to Iowa State
Anna Przyszlak	20	Forward	6'1"	Senior	Gdańsk, Poland	Graduated
Ty'Renisha Bowers	21	Guard	5'8"	Senior	Natchez, LA	Graduated, entered transfer portal
Yar Manyiel	22	Guard/Forward	6'0"	Junior	Nairobi, Kenya	Transferred to Southeast Missouri State

=== Incoming transfers ===
La Salle incoming transfers
Name	Num.	Pos.	Height	Year	Hometown	Previous school
Hassana Amadu	1	Guard	5'9"	Junior	Barcelona, Spain	Casper College (NJCAA)
Vivien Nejašmic	77	Guard	6'0"	Junior	Split, Croatia	Xavier

=== Recruiting class ===
There was no 2026 recruiting class.

== Preseason ==
On October 19, 2026, the Atlantic 10 Conference released its annual preseason poll and honor awards. La Salle was picked to finish tenth in the conference.

=== Preseason rankings ===
Atlantic 10 Preseason Poll
Place	Team	Votes
1	Saint Joseph's	196 (14)
2	Davidson	181
3	George Washington	141
4	George Mason	138
5	Dayton	127
6	Saint Louis	123
7	VCU	106
8	Richmond	101
9	Rhode Island	97
10	La Salle	78
11	St. Bonaventure	59
12	Duquesne	51
13	Fordham	40
14	Loyola Chicago	32
(#) first-place votes

=== Preseason All-Conference Teams ===
Preseason All Conference Teams
Player	Year	Position	Team
Joanie Queen	Junior	Guard	Second
Kiara Williams	Junior	Forward	Third

=== Preseason All-Conference Defensive Team ===
No players were named to the Preseason All-Conference Defensive Team.

== Roster ==
Years are listed according to the new NCAA age-based eligibility model.

2026–27 La Salle Explorers women's basketball team
Players
Coaches

Pos.	#	Name	Height	Year	Previous school	Hometown
G	1	Hassana Amadu	5 ft 9 in (1.75 m)	Jr	Casper College	Barcelona, Spain
G	2	Sophi Hutchinson	5 ft 7 in (1.7 m)	Fr	Spring Valley High School	Huntington, WV
G	3	Lauren Patnode	6 ft 0 in (1.83 m)	Jr	Perkiomen School	Saratoga Springs, NY
F	4	Ioanna Samanta	5 ft 11 in (1.8 m)	Fr	Promitheas School	Chalkida, Greece
G	6	Jana Mbombo Njoya	5 ft 11 in (1.8 m)	So	Tony Parker Adéquat Academy	Montpellier, France
F	7	Amiya Moses	6 ft 2 in (1.88 m)	So	J. Addison School	Scarborough, ON
G	13	Joan Quinn	5 ft 9 in (1.75 m)	Jr	Cardinal O'Hara High School	Newtown Square, PA
G	14	Emilia Coleman	5 ft 11 in (1.8 m)	Fr	Upper Dublin High School	Philadelphia, PA
G	15	Olivia Ostoni	5 ft 9 in (1.75 m)	Fr	Liceo scientifico statale Vittorio Veneto	Milan, Italy
G	22	Zynaye Henry	5 ft 8 in (1.73 m)	Fr	J. Addison School	Pickering, ON
F	24	Kiara Williams	6 ft 0 in (1.83 m)	Jr	Palm Bay High School; Pittsburgh	Palm Bay, FL
G	25	Charity Sawyer	5 ft 8 in (1.73 m)	So	International Christian High School	Philadelphia, PA
G	30	Tiana Thompson	5 ft 9 in (1.75 m)	Fr	St. Mary's High School	New York, NY
C	33	Ava Hoy	6 ft 3 in (1.91 m)	So	H.C. Williams High School	Canton, NY
G	77	Vivien Nejašmic	6 ft 0 in (1.83 m)	Jr	Linigra; Xavier	Split, Croatia

Head coach

- Mountain MacGillivray (Temple)

Assistant coach(es)

- Chris Day (West Chester)
- Tiffany Coll (UMBC)
- Molly Masciantonio (La Salle)
- Fiona Connolly (Valparaiso)

Legend

- (C) Team captain
- (S) Suspended
- (I) Ineligible
- (W) Walk-on
- Injured
- Current redshirt

Roster
Last update: October 27, 2026

== Schedule and results ==
Date time, TV	Rank^{#}	Opponent^{#}	Result	Record	High points	High rebounds	High assists	Site (attendance) city, state
Regular season
November 4, 2026*; 7:00 p.m., B1G+		at Rutgers	L 62–75	0–1	20 – Quinn	8 – Thompson	2 – Quinn	Jersey Mike's Arena (1,214); Piscataway, NJ
November 7, 2026*; 12:00 p.m., ESPN+		Loyola Maryland						John Glaser Arena; Philadelphia, PA
November 11, 2026*; 6:30 p.m., ESPN+		Temple; Big 5 Women's Classic Pod 2						John Glaser Arena; Philadelphia, PA
November 15, 2026*; 2:00 p.m., ACCNX		at Virginia Tech						Cassell Coliseum; Blacksburg, VA
November 18, 2026*; 4:30 p.m., ESPN+		Rowan						John Glaser Arena; Philadelphia, PA
November 21, 2026*; 1:00 p.m., ESPN+		at American						Bender Arena; Washington, D.C.
November 24, 2026*; 11:30 a.m., ESPN+		at Villanova; Big 5 Women's Classic Pod 2						Finneran Pavilion; Villanova, PA
December 2, 2026; 6:30 p.m., ESPN+		George Mason						John Glaser Arena; Philadelphia, PA
December 5, 2026*; TBA		vs. TBD; Big 5 Women's Classic						Palestra; Philadelphia, PA
December 12, 2026*; 2:00 p.m., ESPN+		at Iona						Hynes Athletic Center; New Rochelle, NY
December 15, 2026*; 6:30 p.m., ESPN+		Maryland Eastern Shore						John Glaser Arena; Philadelphia, PA
December 19, 2026*; TBA		vs. UC San Diego; FDU Holiday Classic semifinals						Bogota Savings Bank Center; Hackensack, NJ
December 20, 2026*; TBA		vs. Fairleigh Dickinson or Youngstown State; FDU Holiday Classic						Bogota Savings Bank Center; Hackensack, NJ
December 30, 2026; 6:30 p.m., ESPN+		George Washington						John Glaser Arena; Philadelphia, PA
January 2, 2027; 3:00 p.m., ESPN+		at Fordham						Rose Hill Gymnasium; Bronx, NY
January 6, 2027; 7:00 p.m., ESPN+		at Saint Joseph's						Hagan Arena; Philadelphia, PA
January 9, 2027; 2:00 p.m., ESPN+		Rhode Island						John Glaser Arena; Philadelphia, PA
January 13, 2027; 7:00 p.m., ESPN+		at Davidson						John M. Belk Arena; Davidson, NC
January 16, 2027; 2:00 p.m., ESPN+		St. Bonaventure						John Glaser Arena; Philadelphia, PA
January 20, 2027; 7:00 p.m.		at Dayton						UD Arena; Dayton, OH
January 23, 2027; 2:00 p.m., ESPN+		at VCU						Siegel Center; Richmond, VA
January 27, 2027; 11:00 a.m., ESPN+		Loyola Chicago						John Glaser Arena; Philadelphia, PA
January 30, 2027; 6:00 p.m., ESPN+		at George Washington						Charles E. Smith Center; Washington, D.C.
February 3, 2027; 6:30 p.m., ESPN+		Duquesne						John Glaser Arena; Philadelphia, PA
February 6, 2027; 2:00 p.m., ESPN+		Saint Joseph's						John Glaser Arena; Philadelphia, PA
February 10, 2027; TBA, ESPN+		at Saint Louis						Chaifetz Arena; St. Louis, MO
February 14, 2027; 1:00 p.m., ESPN+		at Loyola Chicago						Joseph J. Gentile Arena; Chicago, IL
February 21, 2027; 2:00 p.m., ESPN+		Fordham						John Glaser Arena; Philadelphia, PA
February 24, 2027; 6:30 p.m., ESPN+		Richmond						John Glaser Arena; Philadelphia, PA
February 27, 2027; 2:00 p.m., ESPN+		at Rhode Island						Ryan Center; Kingston, RI
A-10 tournament
March 3–7, 2027; TBA		vs.						Henrico Sports & Events Center; Henrico, VA
*Non-conference game. ^{#}Rankings from AP Poll. (#) Tournament seedings in parentheses. All times are in Eastern.
