= 2026–27 Fordham Rams women's basketball team =

American college basketball season

2026–27 Fordham Rams women's basketball
- Conference: Atlantic 10 Conference
- Record: 5–2 (0–0 A-10)
- Head coach: Neil Harrow (1st season)
- Associate head coach: Carla Morrow
- Assistant coaches: Jessica Simmonds; Kelly Guarino
- Home arena: Rose Hill Gymnasium

2026–27 Atlantic 10 women's basketball standings
	Conf.				Overall
Team	W		L	PCT	W		L	PCT
Fordham	0	–	0	–	5	–	2	.714
Duquesne	0	–	0	–	4	–	1	.800
Richmond	0	–	0	–	4	–	2	.667
Saint Joseph's	0	–	0	–	3	–	1	.750
St. Bonaventure	0	–	0	–	3	–	1	.750
George Washington	0	–	0	–	3	–	2	.600
George Mason	0	–	0	–	3	–	3	.500
Rhode Island	0	–	0	–	3	–	3	.500
VCU	0	–	0	–	2	–	2	.500
Davidson	0	–	0	–	2	–	3	.400
La Salle	0	–	0	–	2	–	3	.400
Loyola Chicago	0	–	0	–	2	–	3	.400
Saint Louis	0	–	0	–	2	–	3	.400
Dayton	0	–	0	–	1	–	2	.333
† 2027 A10 tournament winner As of November 20, 2026

The 2026–27 Fordham Rams women's basketball team currently represents Fordham University during the 2026–27 NCAA Division I women's basketball season. The Rams, led by first-year head coach Neil Harrow, play their home games at Rose Hill Gymnasium in The Bronx, New York, and compete as a member of the Atlantic 10 Conference.

== Previous season ==
The Rams finished the 2025–26 season 10–20 overall and 2–16 in A-10 play, finishing last in the conference. As the No. 14 seed in the A-10 tournament, they lost 60–68 in the first round to No. 11 seed Saint Louis to end their season.

On March 16, it was announced by Fordham athletic director Charles Guthrie that head coach Bridgette Mitchell would be moving on from the team, ending her tenure after three seasons. On April 1, Neil Harrow was named as the program's new head coach, coming from his first and only season at LIU. In the previous year, Harrow led the Sharks to their first winning season in fourteen years with a 21–11 record.

== Offseason ==
=== Departures ===
Fordham departures
Name	Num.	Pos.	Height	Year	Hometown	Reason for departure
Maysen Hill	1	Guard	5'11"	Freshman	South Kingstown, RI	Transferred to Pittsburgh
Ornella Niankan	5	Forward	6'0"	Graduate Student	Montreal, QC	Graduated
Tia Morgan	7	Guard	5'8"	Graduate Student	Chicago, IL	Graduated
Emma Wilson-Saltos	13	Forward	5'11"	Senior	Bronx, NY	Graduated
Kaila Berry	25	Forward	5'11"	Senior	Brooklyn, NY	Graduated

=== Incoming transfers ===
Fordham incoming transfers
Name	Num.	Pos.	Height	Year	Hometown	Previous school
Ella Averill	13	Guard	6'1"	Sophomore	Perth, Australia	Brandon (U Sports, Canada)
Olivia Kulyk	32	Guard	6'1"	Junior	Edinboro, PA	NJIT

=== Recruiting class ===
There was no 2026 recruiting class.

== Preseason ==
On October 19, 2026, the Atlantic 10 Conference released its preseason poll and honor awards. Fordham was picked to finish thirteenth in the conference.

=== Preseason rankings ===
Atlantic 10 Preseason Poll
Place	Team	Votes
1	Saint Joseph's	196 (14)
2	Davidson	181
3	George Washington	141
4	George Mason	138
5	Dayton	123
6	Saint Louis	123
7	VCU	106
8	Richmond	101
9	Rhode Island	97
10	La Salle	78
11	St. Bonaventure	59
12	Duquesne	51
13	Fordham	40
14	Loyola Chicago	32
(#) first-place votes

=== Preseason All-Conference Teams ===
Preseason All Conference Teams
Player	Year	Position	Team
Alexis Black	Graduate Student	Guard	Second

=== Preseason All-Conference Defensive Team ===
No players were named to the Preseason All-Conference Defensive Team.

== Roster ==
2026–27 Fordham Rams women's basketball team
Players
Coaches

Pos.	#	Name	Height	Year	Previous school	Hometown
G	0	Alexis Black	5 ft 9 in (1.75 m)	Sr	Word of Life Christian Academy; Appalachian State	Washington, D.C.
G	1	Khloe Moye	5 ft 7 in (1.7 m)	Fr	North Raleigh Christian Academy	Greenville, NC
G	3	Carryn Easley	5 ft 5 in (1.65 m)	So	Neumann Goretti High School	Philadelphia, PA
G	4	Lakresha Edwards	6 ft 0 in (1.83 m)	Sr	Fort Erie International Academy; Miami (OH)	Chilliwack, BC
F	5	Iva Sanseovic	6 ft 2 in (1.88 m)	Fr	North Raleigh Christian Academy	Mattersburg, Austria
F	7	Zala Srot	6 ft 1 in (1.85 m)	Fr		Zrece, Slovenia
G	9	Anastasija Veljovic	5 ft 11 in (1.8 m)	Jr	Fort Erie International Academy	Mississauga, Ontario
F	10	London Liley	5 ft 11 in (1.8 m)	So	Maret School	Oxon Hill, MD
F	11	Precious Omoshola	6 ft 2 in (1.88 m)	Jr	Storm King School	London, England
G	12	Caitlyn Martin	5 ft 4 in (1.63 m)	Jr		Katoomba, Australia
G	13	Ella Averill	6 ft 1 in (1.85 m)	So	Brandon	Perth, Australia
G	15	Joy Osigwe	5 ft 8 in (1.73 m)	Fr		Tel Aviv, Israel
F	21	Ugne Sirtautaite	6 ft 1 in (1.85 m)	Sr	Kauno Žalgirio krepšinio akademija Providence	Kaunas, Lithuania
G	32	Olivia Kulyk	6 ft 1 in (1.85 m)	Jr	Mercyhurst Preparatory School; NJIT	Edinboro, PA

Head coach

- Neil Harrow (West of Scotland)

Assistant coach(es)

- Carla Morrow (Tulsa)
- Jessica Simmonds (George Washington)
- Kelly Guarino (NJIT)

Legend

- (C) Team captain
- (S) Suspended
- (I) Ineligible
- (W) Walk-on
- Injured
- Current redshirt

Roster
Last update: October 24, 2026

== Schedule and results ==
Date time, TV	Rank^{#}	Opponent^{#}	Result	Record	High points	High rebounds	High assists	Site (attendance) city, state
Regular season
November 2, 2026*; 6:00 p.m., ESPN+		Niagara	W 70–40	1–0	17 – Edwards	8 – Omoshola	7 – Easley	Rose Hill Gymnasium (439); Bronx, NY
November 5, 2026*; 5:00 p.m., ESPN+		St. Thomas Aquinas	W 70–64	2–0	24 – Sirtautaite	10 – Sirtautaite	7 – Martin	Rose Hill Gymnasium (513); Bronx, NY
November 8, 2026*; 3:00 p.m., ESPN+		Monroe	W 83–46	3–0	21 – Easley	13 – Sirtautaite	5 – Edwards	Rose Hill Gymnasium (399); Bronx, NY
November 11, 2026*; 1:00 p.m., ESPN+		at Bucknell	W 78–71	4–0	28 – Edwards	11 – Veljovic	7 – Easley	Sojka Pavilion (346); Lewisburg, PA
November 15, 2026*; 2:00 p.m., ESPN+		at Manhattan; Battle of the Bronx	L 56–68	4–1	15 – Veljovic	12 – Sirtautaite	5 – Osigwe	Draddy Gymnasium (247); Riverdale, NY
November 17, 2026*; 6:00 p.m., FloCollege		at Campbell	W 72−70	5−1	19 – Kulyk	11 – Sirtautaite	4 – Veljovic	Gore Arena (873); Buies Creek, NC
November 19, 2026*; 11:00 a.m., ACCNX		at No. 5 Duke	L 44–111	5–2	11 – Sirtautaite	6 – Tied	0 – Everybody	Cameron Indoor Stadium (3,051); Durham, NC
November 22, 2026*; 1:00 p.m., ESPN+		Buffalo						Rose Hill Gymnasium; Bronx, NY
November 29, 2026*; 3:00 p.m., ESPN+		Hofstra						Rose Hill Gymnasium; Bronx, NY
December 2, 2026; 6:00 p.m., ESPN+		Davidson						Rose Hill Gymnasium; Bronx, NY
December 5, 2026*; 3:00 p.m., ESPN+		Central Connecticut						Rose Hill Gymnasium; Bronx, NY
December 8, 2026*; 5:00 p.m., ESPN+		at Delaware State						Memorial Hall; Dover, DE
December 12, 2026*; 2:00 p.m., ESPN+		Colgate						Rose Hill Gymnasium; Bronx, NY
December 20, 2026*; 12:00 p.m., B1G+		at Penn State						Rec Hall; State College, PA
December 30, 2026; 6:00 p.m., ESPN+		at Rhode Island						Ryan Center; Kingston, RI
January 2, 2027; 3:00 p.m., ESPN+		La Salle						Rose Hill Gymnasium; Bronx, NY
January 6, 2027; 6:00 p.m., ESPN+		at VCU						Rose Hill Gymnasium; Bronx, NY
January 9, 2027; 2:00 p.m., ESPN+		at Duquesne						UPMC Cooper Fieldhouse; Pittsburgh, PA
January 13, 2027; 6:00 p.m., ESPN+		at George Washington						Charles E. Smith Center; Washington, D.C.
January 16, 2027; 3:00 p.m., ESPN+		George Mason						Rose Hill Gymnasium; Bronx, NY
January 20, 2027; 7:00 p.m., ESPN+		at Saint Joseph's						Hagan Arena; Philadelphia, PA
January 23, 2027; 3:00 p.m., ESPN+		Richmond						Rose Hill Gymnasium; Bronx, NY
January 30, 2027; 1:00 p.m., ESPN+		at St. Bonaventure						Reilly Center; St. Bonaventure, NY
February 3, 2027; 8:00 p.m., ESPN+		at Loyola Chicago						Joseph J. Gentile Arena; Chicago, IL
February 7, 2027; 3:00 p.m., ESPN+		Rhode Island						Rose Hill Gymnasium; Bronx, NY
February 10, 2027; 3:00 p.m., ESPN+		at George Mason						EagleBank Arena; Fairfax, VA
February 13, 2027; 3:00 p.m., ESPN+		Saint Louis						Rose Hill Gymnasium; Bronx, NY
February 17, 2027; 6:00 p.m., ESPN+		George Washington						Rose Hill Gymnasium; Bronx, NY
February 21, 2027; 2:00 p.m., ESPN+		at La Salle						John Glaser Arena; Philadelphia, PA
February 24, 2027; 7:00 p.m., ESPN+		at Dayton						UD Arena; Dayton, OH
February 27, 2027; 3:00 p.m., ESPN+		St. Bonaventure						Rose Hill Gymnasium; Bronx, NY
A-10 tournament
March 3–7, 2027; TBA		vs.						Henrico Sports & Events Center; Henrico, VA
*Non-conference game. ^{#}Rankings from AP Poll. (#) Tournament seedings in parentheses. All times are in Eastern.
