= Gurion =

Gurion is a given name and surname. It may refer to:

- Ben Gurion (disambiguation)
- Carmelo Gurion Lazatin Jr. (born 1969), Filipino politician and businessman currently serving as Congressman from the 1st district of Pampanga since 2025, and previously as Mayor of Angeles City from 2019 to 2025.
- Israel Gurion (born 1935), Israeli musician, member of the Dudaim duo
- Gurion Hyman (1925–2017), Canadian anthropologist, linguist, pharmacist, composer, artist and translator

== See also ==
- Gorion, name variant
- Gourion
