= 2026–27 George Washington Revolutionaries women's basketball team =

American college basketball season

2026–27 George Washington Revolutionaries women's basketball
- Conference: Atlantic 10 Conference
- Record: 1–1 (0–0 A-10)
- Head coach: Ganiyat Adeduntan (2nd season)
- Associate head coach: John Hampton
- Assistant coaches: Essence Baucom; Kindyll Dorsey; Lauren Coleman
- Home arena: Charles E. Smith Center

2026–27 Atlantic 10 women's basketball standings
| | Conf. | | | | Overall |
| Team | W | | L | PCT | W | | L | PCT |
|---|---|---|---|---|---|---|---|---|
| Fordham | 0 | – | 0 | – | 1 | – | 0 | 1.000 |
| George Mason | 0 | – | 0 | – | 1 | – | 0 | 1.000 |
| George Washington | 0 | – | 0 | – | 1 | – | 0 | 1.000 |
| Loyola Chicago | 0 | – | 0 | – | 1 | – | 0 | 1.000 |
| Richmond | 0 | – | 0 | – | 1 | – | 0 | 1.000 |
| St. Bonaventure | 0 | – | 0 | – | 1 | – | 0 | 1.000 |
| VCU | 0 | – | 0 | – | 1 | – | 0 | 1.000 |
| Dayton | 0 | – | 0 | – | 0 | – | 0 | – |
| Saint Joseph's | 0 | – | 0 | – | 0 | – | 0 | – |
| Davidson | 0 | – | 0 | – | 0 | – | 1 | .000 |
| Duquesne | 0 | – | 0 | – | 0 | – | 1 | .000 |
| La Salle | 0 | – | 0 | – | 0 | – | 1 | .000 |
| Rhode Island | 0 | – | 0 | – | 0 | – | 1 | .000 |
| Saint Louis | 0 | – | 0 | – | 0 | – | 1 | .000 |
† 2027 A10 tournament winner As of November 6, 2026

The 2026–27 George Washington Revolutionaries women's basketball team will represent George Washington University during the 2026–27 NCAA Division I women's basketball season. The Revolutionaries, led by second-year head coach Ganiyat Adeduntan, will play their home games at Charles E. Smith Center in Washington, D.C., and compete as a member of the Atlantic 10 Conference.

== Previous season ==
In head coach Ganiyat Adeduntan's first season, the Revolutionaries finished the 2025–26 season 18–18 overall and 7–11 in A-10 play, finishing in a tie for ninth in the conference with St. Bonaventure. As the No. 10 seed in the A-10 tournament, they lost in the second round 54–62 to No. 7 seed Dayton.

Following the tournament, the Revolutionaries earned and accepted an at-large bid to the WNIT, making it their first appearance in the postseason since their 2017 WNIT appearance nine years prior. They defeated Bradley and Southern Indiana in two close games, winning 63–60 and 61–58 respectively in the first and second rounds to advance to the Super 16. They won 71–60 against fellow A-10 member Loyola Chicago 71–62, before ending their season with a 53–61 loss to Illinois State in the Great 8.

== Offseason ==
=== Departures ===
George Washington departures
| Name | Num. | Pos. | Height | Year | Hometown | Reason for departure |
|---|---|---|---|---|---|---|
| Payton Dulin | 3 | Guard | 5'9" | Freshman | Baldwin, NY | Transferred to Quinnipiac |
| Nya Harris | 5 | Guard | 5'9" | Graduate Student | Pittsburgh, PA | Graduated |
| Filipa Calisto | 7 | Guard | 6'0" | Senior | Beira, Mozambique | Graduated |
| Emma Theodorsson | 9 | Guard/Forward | 6'1" | Senior | Pittsburgh, PA | Graduated |
| Mia James | 11 | Guard | 5'4" | Freshman | Dacula, GA | Transferred to Charleston |
| Caia Loving | 13 | Forward | 6'2" | Senior | Upper Marlboro, MD | Graduated |
| Silvia Gonzalez | 14 | Forward | 6'2" | Junior | Sant Adrià de Besòs, Spain | Transferred to Cleveland State |
| Natalia Sierra-Vargas | 22 | Guard | 5'8" | Senior | San Diego, CA | Graduated |
| Colleen Phiri | 24 | Guard | 5'11" | Freshman | Haverhill, MA | Transferred to Holy Cross |

=== Incoming transfers ===
George Washington incoming transfers
| Name | Num. | Pos. | Height | Year | Hometown | Previous school |
|---|---|---|---|---|---|---|
| Cam Rust | 2 | Forward | 6'1" | Junior | Wakefield, RI | Seton Hall |
| Amor Harris | 7 | Guard | 5'9" | Senior | Alexandria, VA | Longwood |
| N'na Konate | 14 | Forward | 6'3" | Sophomore | Lausanne, Switzerland | Campbell |
| Anne Bair | 24 | Guard | 5'8" | Graduate Student | Gettysburg, PA | Colgate |
| Alicia Newell | 33 | Guard | 5'9" | Junior | Clinton, MD | Richmond |

=== Recruiting class ===
There was no 2026 recruiting class.

== Preseason ==
On October 19, 2026, the Atlantic 10 Conference released its annual preseason poll and honor awards. George Washington was picked to finish third in the conference.

=== Preseason rankings ===
Atlantic 10 Preseason Poll
| Place | Team | Votes |
|---|---|---|
| 1 | Saint Joseph's | 196 (14) |
| 2 | Davidson | 181 |
| 3 | George Washington | 141 |
| 4 | George Mason | 138 |
| 5 | Dayton | 127 |
| 6 | Saint Louis | 123 |
| 7 | VCU | 106 |
| 8 | Richmond | 101 |
| 9 | Rhode Island | 97 |
| 10 | La Salle | 78 |
| 11 | St. Bonaventure | 59 |
| 12 | Duquesne | 51 |
| 13 | Fordham | 40 |
| 14 | Loyola Chicago | 32 |
(#) first-place votes

=== Preseason All-Conference Teams ===
Preseason All Conference Teams
| Player | Year | Position | Team |
|---|---|---|---|
| Gabby Reynolds | Junior | Guard | First |
| Sara Lewis | Senior | Forward | Second |

=== Preseason All-Conference Defensive Team ===
No players were named to the Preseason All-Conference Defensive Team.

== Roster ==
2026–27 George Washington Revolutionaries women's basketball team
Players
Coaches

| Pos. | # | Name | Height | Year | Previous school | Hometown |
|---|---|---|---|---|---|---|
| G | 0 | Jaeda Wilson | 5 ft 8 in (1.73 m) | Jr | Connelly School of the Holy Child; Georgetown | Potomac, MD |
| G | 1 | Gabby Reynolds | 5 ft 9 in (1.75 m) | Jr | West Ottawa High School | Holland, MI |
| F | 2 | Cam Rust | 6 ft 1 in (1.85 m) | Jr | Worcester Academy; Seton Hall | Wakefield, RI |
| G | 3 | Tanah Becker | 6 ft 1 in (1.85 m) | Jr | Hamilton Heights Christian Academy; Kentucky | Winnipeg, MB |
| F | 4 | Sara Lewis | 6 ft 1 in (1.85 m) | Sr | Woodward Academy | Atlanta, GA |
| G | 7 | Amor Harris | 5 ft 9 in (1.75 m) | Sr | Alexandria City High School; Longwood | Alexandria, VA |
| G | 8 | Ayla Habbal | 5 ft 7 in (1.7 m) | Fr | City of London Academy, Southwark | London, England |
| F | 10 | Camryn Gunter | 6 ft 2 in (1.88 m) | Fr | Valor Christian Academy | Denver, CO |
| F | 12 | Kamari Sims | 6 ft 1 in (1.85 m) | Sr | Riverdale Baptist School | Severn, MD |
| F | 14 | N'na Konate | 6 ft 3 in (1.91 m) | So | Winston-Salem Christian School; Campbell | Lausanne, Switzerland |
| G | 22 | Bela Cucuta | 5 ft 10 in (1.78 m) | Fr | Tilton School | Newington, CT |
| G | 24 | Anne Bair | 5 ft 8 in (1.73 m) | GS | Gettysburg High School; Colgate | Gettysburg, PA |
| G | 33 | Alicia Newell | 5 ft 9 in (1.75 m) | Jr | Elizabeth Seton High School; Richmond | Clinton, MD |

Head coach

- Ganiyat Adeduntan (Florida State)

Assistant coach(es)

- John Hampton (Mansfield)
- Essence Baucom (Elon)
- Kindyll Dorsey (Boston College)
- Lauren Coleman (Florida State)

Legend

- (C) Team captain
- (S) Suspended
- (I) Ineligible
- (W) Walk-on
- Injured
- Current redshirt

Roster
Last update: October 27, 2026

== Schedule and results ==
| Date time, TV | Rank^{#} | Opponent^{#} | Result | Record | High points | High rebounds | High assists | Site (attendance) city, state |
Exhibition
| October 18, 2026*; 2:00 p.m. | | Towson | W 72–69 | | 14 – Newell | 5 – Lewis | 3 – Tied | Charles E. Smith Center (758); Washington, D.C. |
Regular season
| November 2, 2026*; 5:00 p.m., ESPN+ | | UDC | W 84–23 | 1–0 | 16 – Wilson | 6 – Konate | 6 – Bair | Charles E. Smith Center (723); Washington, D.C. |
| November 5, 2026*; 7:00 p.m., ESPN+ | | at No. 24 West Virginia | L 66–78 | 1–1 | 19 – Newell | 11 – Newell | 3 – Tied | Hope Coliseum (3,232); Morgantown, WV |
| November 11, 2026*; 6:00 p.m., ESPN+ | | Georgetown | | | | | | Charles E. Smith Center; Washington, D.C. |
| November 14, 2026*; 5:30 p.m., ESPN+ | | LIU | | | | | | Charles E. Smith Center; Washington, D.C. |
| November 17, 2026*; 6:00 p.m., ESPN+ | | Temple | | | | | | Charles E. Smith Center; Washington, D.C. |
| November 20, 2026*; 7:00 p.m. | | at Howard | | | | | | Burr Gymnasium; Washington, D.C. |
| November 23, 2026*; 7:30 p.m. | | vs. UAB; Jacksonville Classic | | | | | | The Reef; Jacksonville, FL |
| November 25, 2026*; 1:30 p.m. | | vs. Arizona; Jacksonville Classic | | | | | | The Reef; Jacksonville, FL |
| November 28, 2026*; 2:00 p.m., ESPN+ | | Saint Francis (PA) | | | | | | Charles E. Smith Center; Washington, D.C. |
| December 2, 2026; 6:00 p.m., ESPN+ | | Duquesne | | | | | | Charles E. Smith Center; Washington, D.C. |
| December 5, 2026*; 1:00 p.m., ESPN+ | | at Brown | | | | | | Pizzitola Sports Center; Providence, RI |
| December 8, 2026*; 6:00 p.m., ESPN+ | | Loyola Maryland | | | | | | Charles E. Smith Center; Washington, D.C. |
| December 12, 2026*; 2:00 p.m., ESPN+ | | Rider | | | | | | Charles E. Smith Center; Washington, D.C. |
| December 18, 2026*; 12:00 p.m., B1G+ | | at Northwestern | | | | | | Welsh–Ryan Arena; Evanston, IL |
| December 21, 2026*; 1:00 p.m., ESPN+ | | Maine | | | | | | Charles E. Smith Center; Washington, D.C. |
| December 30, 2026; 6:30 p.m., ESPN+ | | at La Salle | | | | | | John Glaser Arena; Philadelphia, PA |
| January 3, 2027; 2:00 p.m., CBSSN | | at Saint Joseph's | | | | | | Hagan Arena; Philadelphia, PA |
| January 6, 2026; 6:00 p.m., ESPN+ | | St. Bonaventure | | | | | | Charles E. Smith Center; Washington, D.C. |
| January 10, 2026; 12:00 p.m., CBSSN | | Davidson | | | | | | Charles E. Smith Center; Washington, D.C. |
| January 13, 2026; 6:00 p.m., ESPN+ | | Fordham | | | | | | Charles E. Smith Center; Washington, D.C. |
| January 17, 2027; 2:00 p.m., CBSSN | | at Rhode Island | | | | | | Ryan Center; Kingston, RI |
| January 20, 2026; 6:00 p.m., ESPN+ | | VCU | | | | | | Charles E. Smith Center; Washington, D.C. |
| January 23, 2027; 7:00 p.m., ESPN+ | | at Saint Louis | | | | | | Chaifetz Arena; St. Louis, MO |
| January 27, 2027; 7:00 p.m., ESPN+ | | at Dayton | | | | | | UD Arena; Dayton, OH |
| January 30, 2026; 6:00 p.m., ESPN+ | | La Salle | | | | | | Charles E. Smith Center; Washington, D.C. |
| February 7, 2027; 2:00 p.m., ESPNU | | at George Mason; Revolutionary Rivalry | | | | | | EagleBank Arena; Fairfax, VA |
| February 10, 2027; 8:00 p.m., ESPN+ | | at Loyola Chicago | | | | | | Joseph J. Gentile Arena; Chicago, IL |
| February 13, 2026; 2:00 p.m., ESPN+ | | Saint Joseph's | | | | | | Charles E. Smith Center; Washington, D.C. |
| February 17, 2027; 6:00 p.m., ESPN+ | | at Fordham | | | | | | Rose Hill Gymnasium; Bronx, NY |
| February 20, 2026; 2:00 p.m., ESPN+ | | George Mason; Revolutionary Rivalry | | | | | | Charles E. Smith Center; Washington, D.C. |
| February 24, 2026; 6:00 p.m., ESPN+ | | Rhode Island | | | | | | Charles E. Smith Center; Washington, D.C. |
| February 27, 2027; 2:00 p.m., ESPN+ | | at Richmond | | | | | | Robins Center; Richmond, VA |
A-10 tournament
| March 3–7, 2027; TBA | | vs. | | | | | | Henrico Sports & Events Center; Henrico, VA |
*Non-conference game. ^{#}Rankings from AP Poll. (#) Tournament seedings in parentheses. All times are in Eastern.
