= 2026–27 Loyola Ramblers women's basketball team =

American college basketball season

2026–27 Loyola Ramblers women's basketball
- Conference: Atlantic 10 Conference
- Record: 2–3 (0–0 A-10)
- Head coach: Morgan Paige (1st season)
- Assistant coaches: Jordan McCann; Brittany Pinkney; Heidi Messer; Chloe Rice
- Home arena: Joseph J. Gentile Arena

2026–27 Atlantic 10 women's basketball standings
	Conf.				Overall
Team	W		L	PCT	W		L	PCT
Saint Joseph's	0	–	0	–	3	–	0	1.000
Fordham	0	–	0	–	5	–	1	.833
Duquesne	0	–	0	–	4	–	1	.800
St. Bonaventure	0	–	0	–	2	–	1	.667
VCU	0	–	0	–	2	–	1	.667
George Mason	0	–	0	–	3	–	2	.600
George Washington	0	–	0	–	3	–	2	.600
Richmond	0	–	0	–	3	–	2	.600
Saint Louis	0	–	0	–	2	–	2	.500
Rhode Island	0	–	0	–	3	–	3	.500
Loyola Chicago	0	–	0	–	2	–	3	.400
Dayton	0	–	0	–	1	–	2	.333
Davidson	0	–	0	–	1	–	3	.250
La Salle	0	–	0	–	1	–	3	.250
† 2027 A10 tournament winner As of November 18, 2026

The 2026–27 Loyola Ramblers women's basketball team will represent Loyola University Chicago during the 2026–27 NCAA Division I women's basketball season. The Ramblers, led by first-year head coach Morgan Paige, will play their home games at the Joseph J. Gentile Arena in Chicago, Illinois, and compete as a member of the Atlantic 10 Conference.

== Previous season ==
The Ramblers finished the 2025–26 season 16–18 overall and 9–9 in A-10 play, finishing in a tie for seventh in the conference with Dayton. As the No. 8 seed in the Atlantic 10 tournament, they closely defeated No. 9 St. Bonaventure 61–59 in the second round, before falling to top-seeded and eventual tournament champions Rhode Island 64–71 in the quarterfinals.

Following the tournament, the Ramblers earned and accepted their first ever at-large bid to the WNIT, making it their second postseason berth in program history after their 2021 WBI appearance. They defeated Norfolk State 58–54 and Florida Gulf Coast 62–56 in the first and second rounds respectively, before ending their season in the Super 16 when they lost 62–71 to fellow A-10 member George Washington.

On March 31, following the season, head coach Allison Guth announced that she would be resigning and stepping down from the position, ending her tenure with the program after four seasons. Kansas associate head coach Morgan Paige was hired on April 12.

== Offseason ==
=== Departures ===
Loyola departures
Name	Num.	Pos.	Height	Year	Hometown	Reason for departure
Yasmyn Palmer	0	Forward	6'2"	Sophomore	Southfield, MI	Transferred to Arkansas–Pine Bluff
Roisin Grandberry	1	Forward	6'4"	Sophomore	Arlington Heights, IL	Transferred to George Mason
Alexa Kinas	2	Guard	5'8"	Sophomore	Kaukauna, WI	Transferred to Tulsa
Alex-Anne Bessette	10	Guard/Forward	6'2"	Freshman	Quebec City, Quebec	Transferred to Iowa State
Kira Chivers	13	Guard	5'3"	Senior	Chicago, IL	Graduated
Nevaeh Dickman	14	Forward	6'0"	Freshman	Fishers, IN	Transferred to Eastern Illinois
Daniella Matus	20	Guard	5'9"	Freshman	Fairfield, NJ	Transferred to Delaware
Alexus Mobley	22	Guard	5'7"	Graduate Student	Indianapolis, IN	Graduated
Clara Djoko	28	Forward	6'0"	(redshirt) Junior	Entzheim, France	TBD; not listed on roster

=== Incoming transfers ===
Loyola incoming transfers
Name	Num.	Pos.	Height	Year	Hometown	Previous school
Gabby Wilke	1	Forward	6'2"	Junior	Beaver Dam, WI	Butler
MD Ntambue	3	Guard	5'9"	Sophomore	Montreal, Quebec	Villanova
Mireia Jurado	8	Guard	6'0"	Sophomore	Avinyó, Spain	Arizona
Angela Le Faou	10	Forward	6'5"	Sophomore	Bordeaux, France	Pittsburgh
Vasiliki Cholopoulou	24	Guard	5'10"	Sophomore	Kozani, Greece	Columbia
Hailey Johnson	42	Guard	5'11"	Graduate Student	Coto de Caza, CA	Duke

=== Recruiting class ===
There was no 2026 recruiting class.

== Preseason ==
On October 19, 2026, the Atlantic 10 Conference released its annual preseason poll and honor awards. Loyola Chicago was picked to finish last in the conference.

=== Preseason rankings ===
Atlantic 10 Preseason Poll
Place	Team	Votes
1	Saint Joseph's	196 (14)
2	Davidson	181
3	George Washington	141
4	George Mason	138
5	Dayton	127
6	Saint Louis	123
7	VCU	106
8	Richmond	101
9	Rhode Island	97
10	La Salle	78
11	St. Bonaventure	59
12	Duquesne	51
13	Fordham	40
14	Loyola Chicago	32
(#) first-place votes

=== Preseason All-Conference Teams ===
No players were named to the First, Second, or Third Preseason All-Conference Teams.

=== Preseason All-Conference Defensive Team ===
No players were named to the Preseason All-Conference Defensive Team.

== Roster ==
Years are listed according to the new NCAA age-based eligibility model.

2026–27 Loyola Ramblers women's basketball team
Players
Coaches

Pos.	#	Name	Height	Year	Previous school	Hometown
F	1	Gabby Wilke	6 ft 2 in (1.88 m)	Jr	Beaver Dam High School; Butler	Beaver Dam, WI
G	3	MD Ntambue	5 ft 9 in (1.75 m)	So	Crestwood Prep; Villanova	Montreal, Quebec
G	4	Audrey Deptula	6 ft 0 in (1.83 m)	Sr	Middleton High School	Middleton, WI
G	7	Jasmine Perry	5 ft 5 in (1.65 m)	So	Kilbreda College	Melbourne, Australia
G	8	Mireia Jurado	6 ft 0 in (1.83 m)	So	Arizona	Avinyó, Spain
G	9	Rosalie Mercille	5 ft 9 in (1.75 m)	Sr	Cégep Saint-Jean-sur-Richelieu; Monmouth	Montreal, Quebec
F	10	Angela Le Faou	6 ft 5 in (1.96 m)	So	Tony Parker Adéquat Academy; Pittsburgh	Bordeaux, France
G	11	Kendall Hendrix	5 ft 10 in (1.78 m)	Jr	West Bloomfield High School	West Bloomfield, MI
F	21	Brooklyn Vaughn	5 ft 11 in (1.8 m)	Jr	Central Catholic High School	Maumee, OH
G	24	Vasiliki Cholopoulou	5 ft 10 in (1.78 m)	So	Fryganiotis Schools; Columbia	Kozani, Greece
F	42	Hailey Johnson	5 ft 11 in (1.8 m)	GS	JSerra Catholic High School; Duke	Coto de Caza, CA
F	44	Gemma Wichmann	6 ft 0 in (1.83 m)	Fr	Magnificat High School	Cleveland, OH

Head coach

- Morgan Paige (Wisconsin)

Assistant coach(es)

- Jordan McCann (Illinois)
- Brittany Pinkney (VCU)
- Heidi Messer (Grace College)
- Chloe Rice (Bradley)

Legend

- (C) Team captain
- (S) Suspended
- (I) Ineligible
- (W) Walk-on
- Injured
- Current redshirt

Roster
Last update: October 27, 2026

== Schedule and results ==
Date time, TV	Rank^{#}	Opponent^{#}	Result	Record	High points	High rebounds	High assists	Site (attendance) city, state
Exhibition
October 27, 2026*; 6:30 p.m.		Lewis						Joseph J. Gentile Arena; Chicago, IL
Regular season
November 3, 2026*; 7:00 p.m., ESPN+		Wright State						Joseph J. Gentile Arena; Chicago, IL
November 7, 2026*; 6:00 p.m., ESPN+		at Green Bay						Kress Events Center; Green Bay, WI
November 11, 2026*; 7:00 p.m., ESPN+		Arkansas State						Joseph J. Gentile Arena; Chicago, IL
November 14, 2026*; 1:00 p.m., ESPN+		Milwaukee	L 65−71	2−2	24 – Vaughn	7 – Tied	5 – Jurado	Joseph J. Gentile Arena (372); Chicago, IL
November 17, 2026*; 11:00 a.m.		at Illinois State						CEFCU Arena; Normal, IL
November 21, 2026*; 1:00 p.m.		at Western Illinois						Western Hall; Macomb, IL
November 24, 2026*; 7:00 p.m., Marquee		DePaul						Joseph J. Gentile Arena; Chicago, IL
November 29, 2026*; 1:00 p.m., ESPN+		Valparaiso						Joseph J. Gentile Arena; Chicago, IL
December 2, 2026; 7:00 p.m., ESPN+		Richmond						Joseph J. Gentile Arena; Chicago, IL
December 6, 2026*; 2:00 p.m., ESPN+		at Iowa State						Hilton Coliseum; Ames, IA
December 13, 2026*; 1:00 p.m., Marquee		UIC						Joseph J. Gentile Arena; Chicago, IL
December 16, 2026*; 11:00 a.m., Marquee		Northwestern						Joseph J. Gentile Arena; Chicago, IL
December 20, 2026*; 1:00 p.m., ESPN+		at Southern Indiana						Liberty Arena; Evansville, IN
December 23, 2026*; 12:00 p.m., ESPN+		Colorado State						Joseph J. Gentile Arena; Chicago, IL
December 30, 2026; 6:00 p.m., ESPN+		at Davidson						John M. Belk Arena; Davidson, NC
January 2, 2027; 1:00 p.m., ESPN+		Saint Louis						Joseph J. Gentile Arena; Chicago, IL
January 6, 2027; 7:00 p.m., ESPN+		Duquesne						Joseph J. Gentile Arena; Chicago, IL
January 9, 2027; 1:00 p.m., ESPN+		at VCU						Siegel Center; Richmond, VA
January 17, 2027; 1:00 p.m., ESPN+		Dayton						Joseph J. Gentile Arena; Chicago, IL
January 20, 2027; 5:00 p.m., ESPN+		at St. Bonaventure						Reilly Center; St. Bonaventure, NY
January 23, 2027; 1:00 p.m., ESPN+		George Mason						Joseph J. Gentile Arena; Chicago, IL
January 27, 2027; 10:00 a.m., ESPN+		at La Salle						John Glaser Arena; Philadelphia, PA
January 30, 2027; 1:00 p.m., ESPN+		at Saint Joseph's						Hagan Arena; Philadelphia, PA
February 3, 2027; 7:00 p.m., ESPN+		Fordham						Joseph J. Gentile Arena; Chicago, IL
February 6, 2027; 12:00 p.m., ESPN+		at Dayton						UD Arena; Dayton, OH
February 10, 2027; 7:00 p.m., ESPN+		George Washington						Joseph J. Gentile Arena; Chicago, IL
February 14, 2027; 12:00 p.m., ESPN+		La Salle						Joseph J. Gentile Arena; Chicago, IL
February 17, 2027; 7:00 p.m., ESPN+		at Saint Louis						Chaifetz Arena; St. Louis, MO
February 20, 2027; 12:00 p.m., ESPN+		at Rhode Island						Ryan Center; Kingston, RI
February 24, 2027; 7:00 p.m., ESPN+		Davidson						Joseph J. Gentile Arena; Chicago, IL
February 27, 2027; 1:00 p.m., ESPN+		at Duquesne						UPMC Cooper Fieldhouse; Pittsburgh, PA
A-10 tournament
March 3–7, 2027; TBA		vs.						Henrico Sports & Events Center; Henrico, VA
*Non-conference game. ^{#}Rankings from AP Poll. (#) Tournament seedings in parentheses. All times are in Central.
