= 2026–27 Rhode Island Rams women's basketball team =

American college basketball season

2026–27 Rhode Island Rams women's basketball
- Conference: Atlantic 10 Conference
- Record: 0–1 (0–0 A-10)
- Head coach: Colleen Mullen (1st season)
- Associate head coach: Megan Methven
- Assistant coaches: Catherine Cassidy; Carly Fabbri; Taya Robinson
- Home arena: Ryan Center

2026–27 Atlantic 10 women's basketball standings
	Conf.				Overall
Team	W		L	PCT	W		L	PCT
Fordham	0	–	0	–	2	–	0	1.000
George Mason	0	–	0	–	2	–	0	1.000
St. Bonaventure	0	–	0	–	1	–	0	1.000
Saint Joseph's	0	–	0	–	1	–	0	1.000
VCU	0	–	0	–	1	–	0	1.000
George Washington	0	–	0	–	1	–	1	.500
La Salle	0	–	0	–	1	–	1	.500
Loyola Chicago	0	–	0	–	1	–	1	.500
Richmond	0	–	0	–	1	–	1	.500
Saint Louis	0	–	0	–	1	–	1	.500
Dayton	0	–	0	–	0	–	1	.000
Duquesne	0	–	0	–	0	–	1	.000
Davidson	0	–	0	–	0	–	2	.000
Rhode Island	0	–	0	–	0	–	2	.000
† 2027 A10 tournament winner As of November 8, 2026

The 2026–27 Rhode Island Rams women's basketball team currently represents the University of Rhode Island during the 2026–27 NCAA Division I women's basketball season. The Rams, led by first-year head coach Colleen Mullen, play their home games at the Ryan Center in Kingston, Rhode Island, and compete as a member of the Atlantic 10 Conference.

== Previous season ==
The Rams finished the 2025–26 season a program best 28–5 overall and 16–2 in A-10 play, finishing as regular season co-champions alongside George Mason.

As the top seed in the A-10 tournament they defeated No. 8 seed Loyola Chicago 71–64 and No. 4 Davidson 55–46 respectively, to advance to the championship game. They defeated the No. 2 seeded Patriots 53–51, earning their first conference championship in program history to clinch a berth to the NCAA tournament for the first time since 1996.

In the tournament, the Rams were seeded No. 11 in the Fort Worth #3 Regional. They lost in the first round to Alabama 55–68 to end their season.

On March 23, following their NCAA tournament exit, head coach Tammi Reiss departed the program after seven seasons to take the head coaching position for Florida. Six days later on March 29, Albany head coach Colleen Mullen, who played for the Rams from 1998 to 2000 before transferring to New Hampshire, was hired on March 29.

== Offseason ==
=== Departures ===
Rhode Island departures
Name	Num.	Pos.	Height	Year	Hometown	Reason for departure
Ta'Viyanna Habib	3	Guard	5'11"	Graduate Student	Tampa, FL	Graduated
Palmire Mbu	5	Forward	6'1"	Senior	Villeneuve-d'Ascq, France	Graduate transferred
Eva Agba	8	Guard	6'0"	(redshirt) Freshman	Marseille, France	Transferred to New Mexico State
Valentina Ojeda	9	Guard	6'0"	Graduate Student	Punta Arenas, Chile	Graduated
Albina Syla	12	Center	6'5"	Sophomore	Vantaa, Finland	Transferred to California
Brooklyn Gray	14	Guard	5'11"	Senior	Rockford, IL	Graduated
Mary-Kate Tshibuabua	19	Forward	6'1"	(redshirt) Freshman	Ternay, France	Transferred to George Mason
Lilyana Fontcha	20	Center	6'4"	Freshman	Strasbourg, France	Transferred to New Mexico State
Aimée Michel	22	Center	6'3"	Freshman	Albi, France	Transferred to New Mexico State
Vanessa Harris	23	Guard	5'10"	Freshman	Glenarden, MD	Transferred to Florida
Ines Debroise	30	Guard	5'9"	Senior	Paris, France	Graduated

=== Incoming transfers ===
Rhode Island incoming transfers
Name	Num.	Pos.	Height	Year	Hometown	Previous school
Mia Fiore	0	Guard	5'10"	Junior	Narragansett, RI	Merrimack
Anaïs Levasseur	7	Guard	5'8"	Sophomore	Quebec City, QC	Albany
Amaya Stewart	9	Forward	6'1"	Sophomore	West Reading, PA	Albany
Martina Borrellas	13	Guard	6'1"	Junior	Barcelona, Spain	Albany
Delanie Hill	33	Guard	5'7"	Junior	Charlotte, NC	Albany
Queen Ikhiuwu	81	Forward	6'1"	Senior	Madrid, Spain	Wofford

=== Recruiting class ===
There was no 2026 recruiting class.

== Preseason ==
On October 19, 2026, the Atlantic 10 Conference released its annual preseason poll and honor awards. Rhode Island was picked to finish ninth in the conference.

=== Preseason rankings ===
Atlantic 10 Preseason Poll
Place	Team	Votes
1	Saint Joseph's	196 (14)
2	Davidson	181
3	George Washington	141
4	George Mason	138
5	Dayton	127
6	Saint Louis	123
7	VCU	106
8	Richmond	101
9	Rhode Island	97
10	La Salle	78
11	St. Bonaventure	59
12	Duquesne	51
13	Fordham	40
14	Loyola Chicago	32
(#) first-place votes

=== Preseason All-Conference Teams ===
Preseason All Conference Teams
Player	Year	Position	Team
Sophia Vital	Senior	Guard	First

=== Preseason All-Conference Defensive Team ===
Preseason All Conference Defensive Team
Player	Year	Position
Sophia Vital	Senior	Guard

== Roster ==
2026–27 Rhode Island Rams women's basketball team
Players
Coaches

Pos.	#	Name	Height	Year	Previous school	Hometown
G	0	Mia Fiore	5 ft 10 in (1.78 m)	Jr	St. George's School; Merrimack	Narragansett, Rhode Island
G	3	Katie Liggio	5 ft 8 in (1.73 m)	Fr	Red Bank Catholic High School	Colts Neck, New Jersey
G	4	Alex Newson	5 ft 10 in (1.78 m)	Fr	King's Christian Collegiate	Stratford, Prince Edward Island
G	7	Anaïs Levasseur	5 ft 8 in (1.73 m)	So	Cégep Champlain Saint-Lambert; Albany	Quebec City, Quebec
F	9	Amaya Stewart	6 ft 1 in (1.85 m)	So	Wyomissing Area Junior-Senior; Albany	West Reading
G	11	Amori Jarrett	5 ft 8 in (1.73 m)	So	Mt. Zion Prep	Baltimore, Maryland
G	13	Martina Borrellas	6 ft 1 in (1.85 m)	Jr	Lycée Français de Gavà Bon Soleil; Albany	Barcelona, Spain
G	15	Sophia Vital	5 ft 3 in (1.6 m)	Sr	Tabor Academy	Cambridge, Massachusetts
G	17	Ioana Savu	5 ft 10 in (1.78 m)	Fr		Ploiești, Romania
F	29	Naiara Martinez Quintana	—	Fr		Vigo, Spain
G	33	Delanie Hill	5 ft 7 in (1.7 m)	So	Providence Day School; Albany	Charlotte, North Carolina
F	34	Lauren Bousquet	5 ft 11 in (1.8 m)	Fr	Moses Brown School	West Warwick, Rhode Island
F	81	Queen Ikhiuwu	6 ft 1 in (1.85 m)	Sr	IES Carmen Martin Gaite; Wofford	Madrid, Spain

Head coach

- Colleen Mullen (New Hampshire)

Assistant coach(es)

- Megan Methven (Stonehill)
- Catherine Cassidy (Plattsburgh State)
- Carly Fabbri (Quinnipiac)
- Taya Robinson (VCU)

Legend

- (C) Team captain
- (S) Suspended
- (I) Ineligible
- (W) Walk-on
- Injured
- Current redshirt

Roster
Last update: October 27, 2026

== Schedule and results ==
Date time, TV	Rank^{#}	Opponent^{#}	Result	Record	High points	High rebounds	High assists	Site (attendance) city, state
Regular season
November 3, 2026*; 7:00 p.m., ESPN+		at No. 24 West Virginia	L 64–68	0–1	26 – Hill	8 – Stewart	9 – Vital	Hope Coliseum (3,419); Morgantown, WV
November 6, 2026*; 6:00 p.m., ESPN+		vs. Columbia; Curb Event Center Classic	L 62–76	0–2	14 – Borrellas	9 – Borrellas	6 – Vital	Curb Event Center (226); Nashville, TN
November 8, 2026*; 1:00 p.m., ESPN+		vs. South Florida; Curb Event Center Classic	W 82–63	1–2	19 – Stewart	8 – Stewart	5 – Vital	Curb Event Center (203); Nashville, TN
November 12, 2026*; 7:00 p.m.		at Wagner						Spiro Sports Center; Staten Island, NY
November 14, 2026*; 2:00 p.m., ESPN+		at St. John's						Carnesecca Arena; Queens, NY
November 17, 2026*; 6:00 p.m., ESPN+		Emmanuel College						Ryan Center; Kingston, RI
November 20, 2026*; 6:00 p.m., ESPN+		New Haven						Ryan Center; Kingston, RI
November 25, 2026*; 1:00 p.m., ESPN+		Holy Cross						Hart Center Arena; Worcester, MA
December 3, 2026; 7:00 p.m., ESPN+		at Saint Joseph's						Hagan Arena; Philadelphia, PA
December 7, 2026*; 7:00 p.m., ESPN+		Providence						Ryan Center; Kingston, RI
December 10, 2026*; 11:00 a.m.		at Princeton						Jadwin Gymnasium; Princeton, NJ
December 13, 2026*; 1:00 p.m., ESPN+		Maine						Ryan Center; Kingston, RI
December 18, 2026*; 6:00 p.m., ESPN+		Dartmouth						Ryan Center; Kingston, RI
December 20, 2026*; 1:00 p.m., ESPN+		Central Connecticut						Ryan Center; Kingston, RI
December 30, 2026; 6:00 p.m., ESPN+		Fordham						Ryan Center; Kingston, RI
January 2, 2027; 3:00 p.m., ESPN+		at George Mason						EagleBank Arena; Fairfax, VA
January 6, 2027; 6:00 p.m., ESPN+		Dayton						Ryan Center; Kingston, RI
January 9, 2027; 2:00 p.m., ESPN+		at La Salle						John Glaser Arena; Philadelphia, PA
January 13, 2027; 6:00 p.m., ESPN+		at St. Bonaventure						Reilly Center; St. Bonaventure, NY
January 17, 2027; 2:00 p.m., CBSSN		George Washington						Ryan Center; Kingston, RI
January 20, 2027; 11:00 a.m., ESPN+		Saint Louis						Ryan Center; Kingston, RI
January 23, 2027; 1:00 p.m., ESPN+		at Davidson						John M. Belk Arena; Davidson, NC
January 27, 2027; 6:00 p.m., ESPN+		VCU						Ryan Center; Kingston, RI
January 31, 2026; 12:00 p.m., CBSSN		George Mason						Ryan Center; Kingston, RI
February 3, 2027; 12:00 p.m., ESPN+		at Saint Louis						Chaifetz Arena; St. Louis, MO
February 7, 2027; 3:00 p.m., ESPN+		at Fordham						Rose Hill Gymnasium; Bronx, NY
February 10, 2027; 6:00 p.m., ESPN+		Richmond						Ryan Center; Kingston, RI
February 13, 2027; 2:00 p.m., ESPN+		at Duquesne						UPMC Cooper Fieldhouse; Pittsburgh, PA
February 20, 2027; 1:00 p.m., ESPN+		Loyola Chicago						Ryan Center; Kingston, RI
February 24, 2027; 6:00 p.m., ESPN+		at George Washington						Charles E. Smith Center; Washington, D.C.
February 27, 2027; 2:00 p.m., ESPN+		La Salle						Ryan Center; Kingston, RI
A-10 tournament
March 3–7, 2027; TBA		vs.						Henrico Sports & Events Center; Henrico, VA
*Non-conference game. ^{#}Rankings from AP Poll. (#) Tournament seedings in parentheses. All times are in Eastern.

== Rankings ==
Ranking movements
	Week																				
Poll	Pre	1	2	3	4	5	6	7	8	9	10	11	12	13	14	15	16	17	18	19	Final
AP																					
Coaches																					
