= Gorion =

Gorion may refer to:

- Yosef ben Gorion, chronicle of Jewish history
- Micha Yosef Bin-Gorion (1865–1921), Russian-born Hebrew scholar

== See also ==
- Midrash Abba Gorion, a late midrash to the Book of Esther
- Gorion, a fictional character in the Baldur's Gate video game franchise
- Gurion
