= Charlise Dunn =

Australian basketball player (born 2003)

No. 21 – Sydney Flames
- Position: Guard

Personal information
- Born: September 30, 2003 (age 23) Victoria, Australia
- Listed height: 6 ft 2 in (1.88 m)

Career information
- College: Virginia Tech (2022-2023); Davidson College (2023-2026)
- WNBA draft: 2026: 3rd round, 36th overall pick
- Drafted by: Toronto Tempo

Career history
- 2026: Nunawading Spectres
- 2026–: Sydney Flames

Career highlights
- Atlantic 10 Conference First Team (2026); FIBA U15 Oceania Championship MVP (2018)
- Stats at Basketball Reference
Medals
Women's basketball
Representing Australia
FIBA Under-19 Women's Basketball World Cup
Silver medal – second place	2021 Hungary	Team
FIBA U17 Women's Oceania Championship
Gold medal – first place	2019 New Caledonia	Team
FIBA U15 Women's Oceania Championship
Gold medal – first place	2018 Papua New Guinea	Team

Charlise Dunn (born September 30, 2003) is an Australian professional basketball player who plays for the Sydney Flames of the Women's National Basketball League (WNBL). She was selected in the third round of the 2026 WNBA draft by the Toronto Tempo. She played college basketball for the Virginia Tech Hokies and the Davidson Wildcats.

== Early life ==
Dunn was born on September 30, 2003, in Victoria, Australia. She attended Lake Ginninderra College in Canberra, Australia.

== College career ==
Dunn started her college career with Virginia Tech in 2022.

She transferred to Davidson College following the 2022–23 season, playing three seasons for the Wildcats. She was named All-Atlantic 10 Conference three times, including Atlantic 10 Conference First Team in 2026.

She became the first player in Davidson program history to be selected in the WNBA draft and the first Davidson basketball player drafted since Stephen Curry in the 2009 NBA Draft.

== Professional career ==
=== Sydney Flames ===
On April 17, 2026, Dunn signed a two-year deal with the Sydney Flames of the Women's National Basketball League (WNBL).

=== WNBA ===
On April 13, 2026, Dunn was selected by the Toronto Tempo in the third round, 36th overall, of the 2026 WNBA draft.

== International ==
Dunn won gold with Australia at the FIBA U15 Women's Oceania Championship in 2018, where she was named tournament MVP. She also won gold at the FIBA U17 Women's Oceania Championship in 2019.

In 2021, Dunn won a silver medal with Australia at the FIBA Under-19 Women's Basketball World Cup.

== Career statistics ==
=== College ===
Year	Team	GP	GS	MPG	FG%	3P%	FT%	RPG	APG	SPG	BPG	TO	PPG
2022–23	Virginia Tech	11	0	5.5	33.3	16.7	100.0	0.2	0.0	0.3	0.2	0.7	1.4
2023–24	Davidson	23	16	29.9	41.7	33.3	85.5	6.1	1.7	1.3	1.0	2.4	12.7
2024–25	Davidson	28	25	29.2	36.1	30.3	75.8	6.2	1.7	1.6	1.2	2.6	12.0
2025–26	Davidson	33	33	33.6	40.8	30.9	83.5	7.4	1.9	1.8	0.7	2.5	15.3
Career		95	74	28.1	39.4	30.9	82.1	5.9	1.6	1.4	0.9	2.2	12.1
Statistics retrieved from Sports-Reference.
