= Saint Rose, Illinois =

- Village
- Location within Illinois Location within the United States
- Coordinates: 38°40′57″N 89°33′13″W
- Country: United States
- State: Illinois
- County: Clinton

Government
  - Mayor: Dominic A Wessel

Area
  - Total: 0.59 sq mi (1.53 km^{2})
  - Land: 0.59 sq mi (1.53 km^{2})
  - Water: 0 sq mi (0.00 km^{2})
- Elevation: 499 ft (152 m)

Population (2020)
  - Total: 459
  - Density: 777.2/sq mi (300.07/km^{2})
- Time zone: UTC-6 (Central (CST))
  - Summer (DST): UTC-5 (CDT)
- ZIP code: 62230
- Area code: 618
- GNIS feature ID: 2786434
- FIPS code: 17-67158
- Website: stroseil.org

Saint Rose is a village in Clinton County, Illinois, United States. Saint Rose is 5 miles (8.0 km) north-northwest of Breese. The population was 459 as of the 2020 census.

== History ==
The community voted to incorporate as a village on November 8, 2016; the result of the vote was 168–82 in favor of incorporation.

== Geography ==
According to the 2021 census gazetteer files, St. Rose has a total area of 0.59 square miles (1.53 km^{2}), all land.

== Demographics ==
Historical population
Census	Pop.	Note	%±
2020	459		—
U.S. Decennial Census

As of the 2020 census there were 459 people, 207 households, and 159 families residing in the village. The population density was 776.65 inhabitants per square mile (299.87/km^{2}). There were 180 housing units at an average density of 304.57 per square mile (117.60/km^{2}). The racial makeup of the village was 94.55% White, 0.22% African American, 0.65% Native American, 2.61% from other races, and 1.96% from two or more races. Hispanic or Latino of any race were 2.83% of the population.

There were 207 households, out of which 43.0% had children under the age of 18 living with them, 62.32% were married couples living together, 7.73% had a female householder with no husband present, and 23.19% were non-families. 22.71% of all households were made up of individuals, and 13.53% had someone living alone who was 65 years of age or older. The average household size was 3.28 and the average family size was 2.79.

The village's age distribution consisted of 31.9% under the age of 18, 4.7% from 18 to 24, 26.1% from 25 to 44, 21.5% from 45 to 64, and 15.8% who were 65 years of age or older. The median age was 34.9 years. For every 100 females, there were 85.5 males. For every 100 females age 18 and over, there were 88.9 males.

The median income for a household in the village was $83,281, and the median income for a family was $101,250. Males had a median income of $56,250 versus $35,729 for females. The per capita income for the village was $34,827. About 0.6% of families and 1.0% of the population were below the poverty line, including 1.1% of those under age 18 and none of those age 65 or over.

== Education ==
- St. Rose Elementary
- Central Community High School - Formed as a consolidation of the Breese and Aviston high schools in 1971
