= Loyola Ramblers women's basketball =

Loyola Ramblers
2026–27 Loyola Ramblers women's basketball team
- University: Loyola University Chicago
- Head coach: Morgan Paige (1st season)
- Location: Chicago, Illinois
- Arena: Joseph J. Gentile Arena (capacity: 4,486)
- Conference: Atlantic 10
- Nickname: Ramblers
- Colors: Maroon and gold

Uniforms
Home	Away

The Loyola Ramblers women's basketball team represents Loyola University Chicago, located in Chicago, Illinois, United States, in NCAA Division I basketball competition. They currently compete in the Atlantic 10 Conference.

== History ==
The Ramblers have never made the NCAA tournament. Prior to the move from the Horizon League to the Missouri Valley Conference, they finished as runner up in the tournament final in 1987 and 2013. In 2021, they earned their first postseason berth to the Women's Basketball Invitational.
