= Ben Gurion High School =

Coordinates: 32°04′47″N 34°52′08″E

- Petah Tikva, Israel.

Information
- Type: High School

Ben Gurion High School is a high school in Petah Tikva, Israel.

== Organisation ==
The school currently educates approximately 1600 students from across Petah Tikva.

== Events ==
Former athlete Ben Johnson spoke against drugs, in a meeting at the school on November 20, 2008, and explained why he took performance-enhancing drugs.
