= 2026–27 Georgetown Hoyas women's basketball team =

Intercollegiate basketball season

2026–27 Georgetown Hoyas women's basketball
- Conference: Big East Conference
- Record: 4–1 (0–0 Big East)
- Head coach: Darnell Haney (4th season)
- Assistant coaches: Camille Collier; Niki Washington; Eric Lindsey
- Home arena: McDonough Arena

2026–27 Big East women's basketball standings
	Conf.				Overall
Team	W		L	PCT	W		L	PCT
Butler	0	–	0	–	4	–	0	1.000
St. John's	0	–	0	–	4	–	0	1.000
Xavier	0	–	0	–	3	–	0	1.000
DePaul	0	–	0	–	4	–	1	.800
Georgetown	0	–	0	–	3	–	1	.750
Marquette	0	–	0	–	3	–	1	.750
No. 4 UConn	0	–	0	–	3	–	1	.750
Creighton	0	–	0	–	2	–	1	.667
Seton Hall	0	–	0	–	2	–	1	.667
Villanova	0	–	0	–	1	–	2	.333
Providence	0	–	0	–	1	–	3	.250
† 2027 Big East tournament winner As of November 15, 2026; Rankings from AP poll

The 2026–27 Georgetown Hoyas women's basketball team currently represents Georgetown University during the 2026–27 NCAA Division I women's basketball season. The Hoyas, led by fourth-year head coach Darnell Haney, play their home games at McDonough Arena in Washington, D.C., and compete as a member of the Big East Conference.

== Previous season ==
The Hoyas finished the 2025–26 season 14–17 overall and 6–14 in Big East play, finishing ninth in the conference. As the No. 8 seed in the Big East tournament, they defeated No. 9 Butler 62–58 in the first round, before falling to top-seeded and undefeated UConn 39–84 in the quarterfinals to end their season.

== Offseason ==
=== Departures ===
Georgetown departures
Name	Number	Pos.	Height	Year	Hometown	Reason for departure
Laila Jewett	0	Guard	5'10"	Graduate Student	Woodbridge, VA	Graduated, entered transfer portal
Victoria Rivera	3	Guard	6'0"	Senior	Houston, TX	Graduated, transferred to Pacific
Modesti McConnell	5	Guard	5'7"	Senior	Edmond, OK	Graduated
Alexia Araujo-Dagba	7	Forward	6'1"	Sophomore	Recife, Brazil	Transferred to Idaho
Khadee Hession	8	Guard	5'9"	Sophomore	Miami, FL	Transferred to Tulane
Brianna Scott	15	Forward	6'4"	Graduate Student	Reston, VA	Graduated
Braelynn Barrett	20	Forward	6'1"	Freshman	Aurora, CO	Transferred to San Diego
Indya Davis	22	Guard	5'10"	Sophomore	Detroit, MI	Transferred to Central Michigan
Summer Davis	23	Guard	5'10"	Sophomore	Detroit, MI	Transferred to Central Michigan
Cristen Carter	24	Forward	6'4"	Junior	Indianapolis, IN	Transferred to Penn State
Chetanna Nweke	25	Forward	6'0"	Graduate Student	Woodbine, MD	Graduated

=== Incoming transfers ===
Georgetown incoming transfers
Name	Number	Pos.	Height	Year	Hometown	Previous school
Winner Bartholemew	2	Guard/Forward	6'1"	Junior	Ajitata, Nigeria	Pacific
Johnea Donohue	3	Guard	5'7"	Junior	Flint, MI	Bowling Green
J'Bionna Robinson	13	Guard	5'7"	Sophomore	Atlanta, GA	Northern Arizona
Clarence Djuela	14	Forward	6'3"	Junior	Berlin, Germany	Northwestern State
Corrie McLaughlin	24	Forward	6'2"	Senior	Raleigh, NC	UNC Wilmington

=== Recruiting class ===
There was no 2026 recruiting class.

== Preseason ==
On October 1, 2026, the Big East Conference released its annual preseason coaches poll and awards. Georgetown was picked to finish eighth in the conference.

=== Preseason rankings ===
Big East Preseason Poll
Place	Team	Votes
1	UConn	100 (10)
2	Villanova	90 (1)
3	Creighton	78
4	St. John's	68
5	Seton Hall	67
6	Marquette	60
7	Providence	38
8	Georgetown	36
9	Xavier	29
10	Butler	21
11	DePaul	18
(#) first-place votes

=== Preseason All-Big East Team ===
No players were selected for the Preseason All-Big East Team.

=== Honorable Mentions ===
No players were selected as Preseason All-Big East Honorable Mentions.

== Roster ==
2026–27 Georgetown Hoyas women's basketball team
Players
Coaches

Pos.	#	Name	Height	Year	Previous school	Hometown
G	0	Kendall Perry	5 ft 9 in (1.75 m)	Fr	Montverde Academy	Orlando, FL
G/F	2	Winner Bartholomew	6 ft 1 in (1.85 m)	Jr	Day Secondary School; Pacific	Ajitata, Nigeria
G	3	Johnea Donohue	5 ft 7 in (1.7 m)	Jr	R. Nelson Snider High School; Bowling Green	Flint, MI
G	4	Destini Agubata	5 ft 11 in (1.8 m)	Jr	Santiago High School; West Virginia	Moreno Valley, CA
F	5	Stella Lockhart	6 ft 2 in (1.88 m)	Fr	St. John Vianney High School	Montclair, NJ
G	10	Amanda Ajobiewe	5 ft 9 in (1.75 m)	Jr	Ontario Christian High School	Riverside, CA
G	11	Khia Miller	5 ft 10 in (1.78 m)	Sr	Sidwell Friends School; East Carolina	Woodbridge, VA
G	13	J'Bionna Robinson	5 ft 7 in (1.7 m)	So	Morrow High School; Northrn Arizona	Atlanta, GA
F	14	Clarence Djuela	6 ft 3 in (1.91 m)	Jr	Sophie Scholl Schule; Northwestern State	Berlin, Germany
G	16	Bo Frost	6 ft 2 in (1.88 m)	Fr	Oaklands College	Reykjavik, Iceland
F	24	Corrie McLaughlin	6 ft 2 in (1.88 m)	Sr	Millbrook Magnet High School; UNC Wilmington	Raleigh, NC
F	32	Brianna Byars	6 ft 0 in (1.83 m)	Jr	George Rogers Clark; Cincinnati	Paris, KY

Head coach

- Darnell Haney (Florida A&M)

Assistant coach(es)

- Camille Collier (Wake Forest)
- Niki Washington (Southern Illinois)
- Eric Lindsey (Washington Adventist)

Legend

- (C) Team captain
- (S) Suspended
- (I) Ineligible
- (W) Walk-on
- Injured
- Current redshirt

Roster
Last update: September 22, 2026

== Schedule and results ==
Date time, TV	Rank^{#}	Opponent^{#}	Result	Record	High points	High rebounds	High assists	Site (attendance) city, state
Regular season
November 2, 2026*; 7:00 p.m., ESPN+		Delaware State	W 84–47	1–0	15 – Agubata	8 – Djuela	5 – Tied	McDonough Arena (413); Washington, D.C.
November 5, 2026*; 7:00 p.m., ESPN+		American	W 75–65	2–0	18 – Byars	9 – Agubata	5 – Donahue	McDonough Arena (502); Washington, D.C.
November 8, 2026*; 2:00 p.m., ESPN+		Saint Peter's	W 97–37	3–0	24 – Agubata	8 – Byars	7 – Donahue	McDonough Arena (347); Washington, D.C.
November 11, 2026*; 6:00 p.m., ESPN+		at George Washington	L 74–78	3–1	18 – Ajobiewe	Byars – 10	8 – Donahue	Charles E. Smith Center (1,124); Washington, D.C.
November 15, 2026*; 2:00 p.m., ESPN+		Howard	W 68–56	4–1	21 – Tied	10 – Agubata	4 – Donahue	McDonough Arena; Washington, D.C.
November 19, 2026*; 7:00 p.m., ACCNX		at NC State						Reynolds Coliseum; Raleigh, NC
November 22, 2026*; TBA		at Temple						Liacouras Center; Philadelphia, PA
November 27, 2026*; 1:15 p.m., BallerTV		vs. Clemson; Daytona Beach Classic						Ocean Center; Daytona Beach, FL
November 28, 2026*; 5:45 p.m., BallerTV		vs. Rutgers; Daytona Beach Classic						Ocean Center; Daytona Beach, FL
December 2, 2026*; 7:00 p.m., ESPN+		Morgan State						McDonough Arena; Washington, D.C.
December 6, 2026; 2:00 p.m., ESPN+		DePaul						McDonough Arena; Washington, D.C.
December 10, 2026; 7:00 p.m., TruTV		at St. John's						Carnesecca Arena; Queens, NY
December 13, 2026*; 2:00 p.m., ESPN+		Loyola Maryland						McDonough Arena; Washington, D.C.
December 17, 2026*; 7:00 p.m., ESPN+		Davidson						McDonough Arena; Washington, D.C.
December 20, 2026; 2:00 p.m., ESPN+		Xavier						McDonough Arena; Washington, D.C.
December 23, 2026; 12:00 p.m., ESPN+		Providence						McDonough Arena; Washington, D.C.
December 30, 2026; 7:00 p.m., ESPN+		at Villanova						Finneran Pavilion; Villanova, PA
January 2, 2027; 3:00 p.m., ESPN+		Creighton						McDonough Arena; Washington, D.C.
January 7, 2027; 7:00 p.m., TNT		at UConn						PeoplesBank Arena; Hartford, CT
January 13, 2027; 7:00 p.m., ESPN+		Seton Hall						McDonough Arena; Washington, D.C.
January 17, 2027; 3:00 p.m., ESPN+		at Marquette						Al McGuire Center; Milwaukee, WI
January 20, 2027; 11:00 a.m., ESPN+		Villanova						McDonough Arena; Washington, D.C.
January 23, 2027; 3:00 p.m., ESPN+		at DePaul						Wintrust Arena; Chicago, IL
January 30, 2027; 2:00 p.m., ESPN+		Butler						McDonough Arena; Washington, D.C.
February 3, 2027; 7:00 p.m., ESPN+		at Providence						Alumni Hall; Providence, RI
February 6, 2027; 2:00 p.m., ESPN+		at Creighton						D. J. Sokol Arena; Omaha, NE
February 10, 2027; 7:00 p.m., ESPN+		Marquette						McDonough Arena; Washington, D.C.
February 14, 2027; 1:00 p.m., ESPN+		at Seton Hall						Walsh Gymnasium; South Orange, NJ
February 18, 2027; 7:00 p.m., Peacock/NBCSN		UConn						Capital One Arena; Washington, D.C.
February 21, 2027; 1:00 p.m., ESPN+		at Xavier						Cintas Center; Cincinnati, OH
February 24, 2027; 7:00 p.m., ESPN+		at Butler						Hinkle Fieldhouse; Indianapolis, IN
February 27, 2027; 2:00 p.m., ESPN+		St. John's						McDonough Arena; Washington, D.C.
Big East tournament
March 5–8, 2027; TBA		vs.						Mohegan Sun Arena; Uncasville, CT
*Non-conference game. ^{#}Rankings from AP Poll. (#) Tournament seedings in parentheses. All times are in Eastern.
