= 2026–27 DePaul Blue Demons women's basketball team =

Intercollegiate basketball season

2026–27 DePaul Blue Demons women's basketball
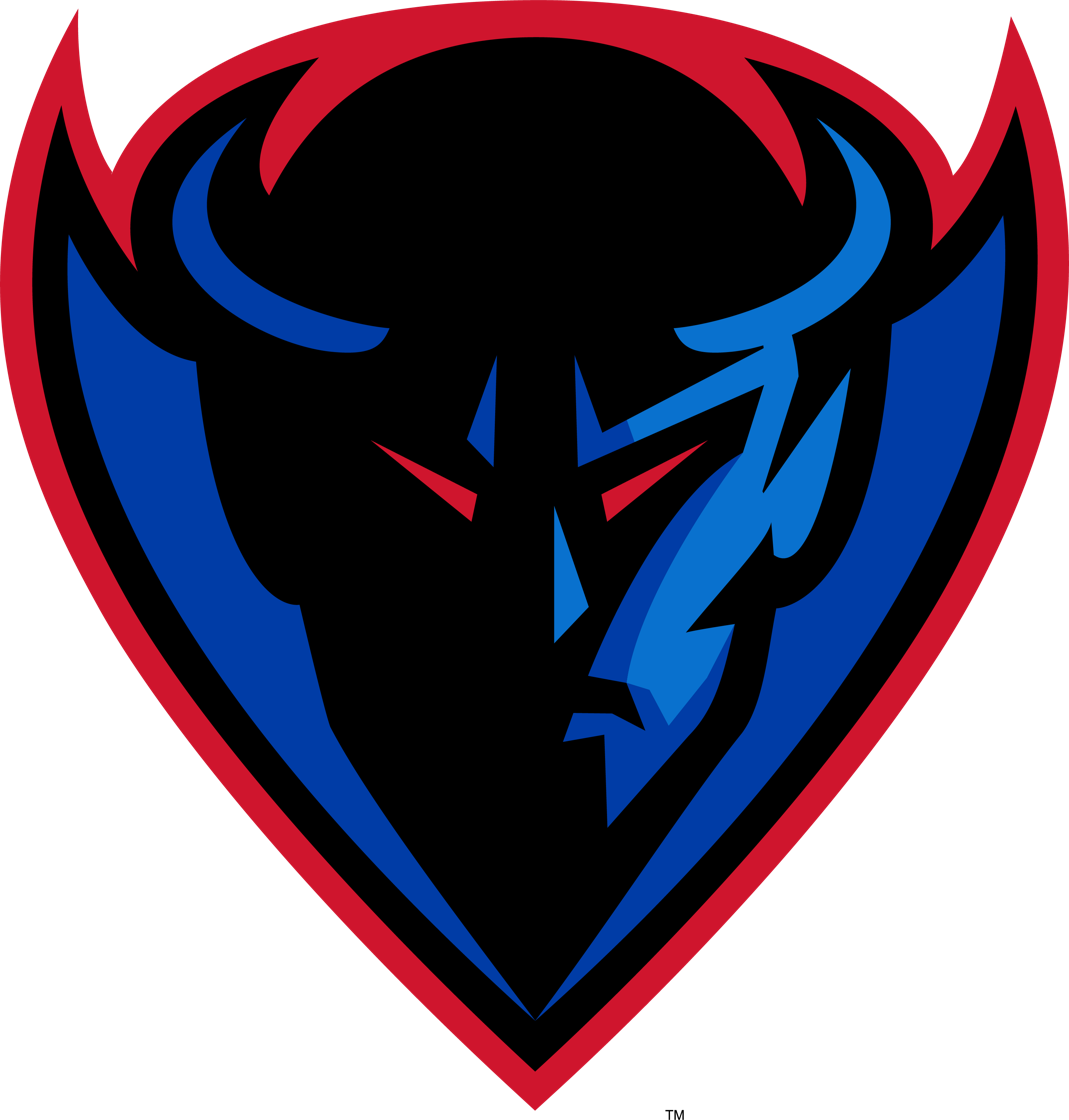
- Conference: Big East Conference
- Record: 5–1 (0–0 Big East)
- Head coach: Jill M. Pizzotti (2nd season)
- Associate head coach: Ty Evans
- Assistant coaches: Bradley Bruno; Ashton Millender; Kathleen Doyle; Jasmine Fogle
- Home arena: Wintrust Arena

2026–27 Big East women's basketball standings
	Conf.				Overall
Team	W		L	PCT	W		L	PCT
No. 7 UConn	1	–	0	1.000	4	–	2	.667
Butler	0	–	0	–	6	–	0	1.000
DePaul	0	–	0	–	6	–	1	.857
Creighton	0	–	0	–	4	–	1	.800
St. John's	0	–	0	–	4	–	1	.800
Xavier	0	–	0	–	4	–	1	.800
Georgetown	0	–	0	–	4	–	2	.667
Marquette	0	–	0	–	4	–	2	.667
Villanova	0	–	0	–	3	–	2	.600
Providence	0	–	0	–	2	–	4	.333
Seton Hall	0	–	1	.000	2	–	4	.333
† 2027 Big East tournament winner As of November 22, 2026; Rankings from AP poll

The 2026–27 DePaul Blue Demons women's basketball team currently represents DePaul University during the 2026–27 NCAA Division I women's basketball season. The Blue Demons, led by second-year head coach Jill Pizzotti, play their home games at the Wintrust Arena in Chicago, Illinois and compete as a member of the Big East Conference.

== Previous season ==
In their first season under Jill M. Pizzotti, the Blue Demons finished the 2025–26 season a program-worst 8–24 overall and 5–15 in Big East play, finishing tenth in the conference. As the No. 10 seed in the Big East tournament, they lost 55–69 in the first round to No. 7 Providence in the first round to end their season.

== Offseason ==
=== Departures ===
DePaul departures
Name	Number	Pos.	Height	Year	Hometown	Reason for departure
Aizhanique Mayo	1	Guard	5'9"	(redshirt) Junior	Bridgeport, CT	Transferred to Tulane
Alayna West	3	Guard	5'10"	(redshirt) Freshman	Madison, WI	Transferred to Alabama
Meg Newman	9	Forward	6'2"	(redshirt) Senior	Indianapolis, IN	Graduated
Katelynn Oxley	10	Forward	6'4"	Graduate Student	Lincoln, NE	Graduated
Sumer Lee	11	Guard	5'8"	Junior	Toronto, Ontario	Transferred to Cal Poly
Shakira McCline	20	Guard	5'6"	Junior	East St. Louis, IL	Transferred to Southern Illinois
Natiah Nelson	21	Guard	5'9"	Sophomore	Perrysburg, OH	Transferred to Toledo
Faith Okorie	22	Forward	6'0"	(redshirt) Sophomore	Chicago, IL	Entered transfer portal
Michelle Ojo	23	Forward	6'0"	Graduate Student	Virginia Beach, VA	Graduated
Kate Novik	33	Guard	6'0"	Junior	Grodno, Belarus	Transferred to South Florida
Justis Odom	35	Forward	6'2"	Graduate Student	Indianapolis, IN	Graduated

=== Incoming transfers ===
DePaul incoming transfers
Name	Number	Pos.	Height	Year	Hometown	Previous school
Louis Volker	1	Forward	6'1"	Senior	Purcellville, VA	George Mason
Nyah Lowery	15	Guard	6'0"	Senior	Sacramento, CA	Pacific
Kaliyah Dillard	22	Forward	6'0"	Senior	Las Vegas, NV	San Jose State
Zoey Ward	30	Forward	6'0"	Senior	Gastonia, NC	Iona
Doyinsola Lijirin	33	Forward	6'3"	Senior	Ondo State, Nigeria	Wagner
Emily Bojan	34	Guard	5'11"	5th Year	Chicago, IL	Wisconsin (softball)

=== Recruiting class ===
There was no 2026 recruiting class.

== Preseason ==
On October 1, 2026, the Big East Conference released its annual preseason coaches poll and awards. DePaul was picked to finish last in the conference.

=== Preseason rankings ===
Big East Preseason Poll
Place	Team	Votes
1	UConn	100 (10)
2	Villanova	90 (1)
3	Creighton	78
4	St. John's	68
5	Seton Hall	67
6	Marquette	60
7	Providence	38
8	Georgetown	36
9	Xavier	29
10	Butler	21
11	DePaul	18
(#) first-place votes

=== Preseason All-Big East Team ===
No players were selected for the Preseason All-Big East Team.

=== Honorable Mentions ===
No players were selected as Preseason All-Big East Honorable Mentions.

== Roster ==
Years are listed according to the new NCAA age-based eligibility model.

2026–27 DePaul Blue Demons women's basketball team
Players
Coaches

Pos.	#	Name	Height	Year	Previous school	Hometown
G	0	Gina Davorija	5 ft 9 in (1.75 m)	Jr	Glenbrook South High School	Glenview, IL
F	3	Louis Volker	6 ft 1 in (1.85 m)	Sr	Paul VI High School; George Mason	Purcellville, VA
G	7	Devin Hagemann (injured)	5 ft 6 in (1.68 m)	So	Detroit Edison High School Academy	Detroit, MI
G	8	Mikaia Litza	5 ft 8 in (1.73 m)	Fr	Wauwatosa East High School	Wauwatosa, WI
G	15	Nyah Lowery	6 ft 0 in (1.83 m)	Sr	Saint Mary's High School; Pacific	Sacramento, CA
G	22	Kaliyah Dillard	6 ft 0 in (1.83 m)	Sr	Centennial High School; San Jose State	Las Vegas, NV
G	24	Ally Timm	5 ft 10 in (1.78 m)	Jr	Divine Savior Holy Angels High School	Menomonee Falls, WI
G	25	Kate Clarke (5th)	6 ft 1 in (1.85 m)	Sr	Carmel High School; Michigan	Carmel, IN
F	30	Zoey Ward	6 ft 0 in (1.83 m)	Sr	Concord High School; Iona	Gastonia, NC
F	33	Doyinsola Lijirin	6 ft 0 in (1.83 m)	Sr	Topfield College; Wagner	Ondo State, Nigeria
G	34	Emily Bohan (5th)	5 ft 11 in (1.8 m)	Sr	Marist High School; Wisconsin	Chicago, IL
G	77	Ofek Talker	5 ft 5 in (1.65 m)	Sr	Hapoel Be'er Sheva B.C.	Gan Yavne, Israel

Head coach

- Jill M. Pizzotti (Southeast Missouri State)

Assistant coach(es)

- Ty Evans (UW–Whitewater)
- Bradley Bruno (DePaul)
- Ashton Millender (DePaul)
- Kathleen Doyle (Iowa)
- Jasmyne Fogle (Franklin Pierce)

Legend

- (C) Team captain
- (S) Suspended
- (I) Ineligible
- (W) Walk-on
- Injured
- Current redshirt

Roster
Last update: September 20, 2026

== Schedule and results ==
Date time, TV	Rank^{#}	Opponent^{#}	Result	Record	High points	High rebounds	High assists	Site (attendance) city, state
Exhibition
October 16, 2026*; 7:00 p.m.		UIC	W 72–66		21 – Clarke	8 – Volker	9 – Litza	Sullivan Athletic Center (361); Chicago, IL
Regular season
November 3, 2026*; 6:00 p.m., ESPN+		Evansville	W 90–65	1–0	20 – Ward	11 – Volker	7 – Davorija	Wintrust Arena (948); Chicago, IL
November 6, 2026*; 11:00 a.m., ESPN+		Purdue Fort Wayne	W 87–62	2–0	17 – Litza	15 – Tied	9 – Litza	Wintrust Arena (8,270); Chicago, IL
November 8, 2026*; 2:00 p.m., ESPN+		Stonehill	W 95–63	3–0	15 – Litza	10 – Ward	7 – Volker	Wintrust Arena (1,071); Chicago, IL
November 11, 2026*; 6:00 p.m., ESPN+		Northern Illinois	W 85–65	4–0	20 – Clarke	12 – Ward	7 – Davorija	Wintrust Arena (1,199); Chicago, IL
November 14, 2026*; 12:00 p.m., NBC		vs. No. 13 Notre Dame; Shamrock Classic	L 84–108	4–1	20 – Clarke	10 – Ward	11 – Litza	Colonial Hall (1,020); White Sulphur Springs, WV
November 18, 2026*; 6:00 p.m., ESPN+		Bradley	W 86–74	5–1	25 – Davorija	7 – Volker	10 – Litza	Wintrust Arena (1,011); Chicago, IL
November 21, 2026*; 2:00 p.m., ESPN+		IU Indy	W 85–67	6–1	23 – Timm	11 – Lijirin	10 – Litza	Wintrust Arena (1,246); Chicago, IL
November 24, 2026*; 7:00 p.m., Marquee		at Loyola Chicago						Joseph J. Gentile Arena; Chicago, IL
November 27, 2026*; 11:00 a.m., B1G+		at Northwestern						Welsh–Ryan Arena; Evanston, IL
November 29, 2026*; 2:00 p.m., ESPN+		Bucknell						Wintrust Arena; Chicago, IL
December 3, 2026; 6:00 p.m., ESPN+		at Villanova						Finneran Pavilion; Villanova, PA
December 6, 2026; 1:00 p.m., ESPN+		at Georgetown						McDonough Arena; Washington, D.C.
December 10, 2026; 6:00 p.m., ESPN+		Butler						Wintrust Arena; Chicago, IL
December 13, 2026*; 1:00 p.m., B1G+		at Michigan State						Breslin Center; East Lansing, MI
December 16, 2026*; 11:00 a.m., ESPN+		Eastern Illinois						Wintrust Arena; Chicago, IL
December 20, 2026; 2:00 p.m., ESPN+		Creighton						Wintrust Arena; Chicago, IL
January 3, 2027; 3:00 p.m., NBC		UConn						Wintrust Arena; Chicago, IL
January 7, 2027; 6:00 p.m., ESPN+		at Seton Hall						Walsh Gymnasium; South Orange, NJ
January 10, 2027; 2:00 p.m., ESPN+		Marquette						Wintrust Arena; Chicago, IL
January 13, 2027; 5:30 p.m., ESPN+		at Xavier						Cintas Center; Cincinnati, OH
January 17, 2027; 1:00 p.m., ESPN+		at St. John's						Carnesecca Arena; Queens, NY
January 20, 2027; 6:00 p.m., ESPN+		Providence						Wintrust Arena; Chicago, IL
January 23, 2027; 2:00 p.m., ESPN+		Georgetown						Wintrust Arena; Chicago, IL
January 28, 2027; 5:30 p.m., FS1		at UConn						Harry A. Gampel Pavilion; Storrs, CT
February 4, 2027; 8:00 p.m., TruTV		Villanova						Wintrust Arena; Chicago, IL
February 7, 2027; 2:00 p.m., ESPN+		St. John's						Wintrust Arena; Chicago, IL
February 10, 2027; 6:30 p.m., ESPN+		at Creighton						D. J. Sokol Arena; Omaha, NE
February 14, 2027; 12:00 p.m., ESPN+		at Providence						Alumni Hall; Providence, RI
February 17, 2027; 6:00 p.m., ESPN+		Seton Hall						Wintrust Arena; Chicago, IL
February 21, 2027; 1:00 p.m., ESPN+		at Butler						Hinkle Fieldhouse; Indianapolis, IN
February 24, 2027; 6:30 p.m., ESPN+		at Marquette						Al McGuire Center; Milwaukee, WI
February 28, 2027; 2:00 p.m., ESPN+		Xavier						Wintrust Arena; Chicago, IL
Big East tournament
March 5–8, 2027; TBA		vs.						Mohegan Sun Arena; Uncasville, CT
*Non-conference game. ^{#}Rankings from AP Poll. (#) Tournament seedings in parentheses. All times are in Central.
