= 2026–27 Providence Friars women's basketball team =

Intercollegiate basketball season

2026–27 Providence Friars women's basketball
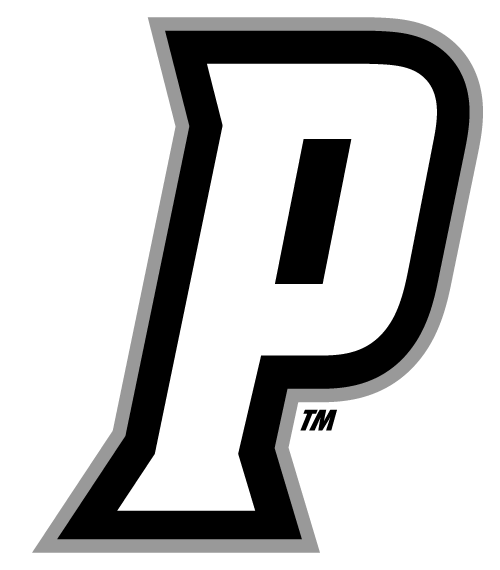
- Conference: Big East Conference
- Record: 2–4 (0–0 Big East)
- Head coach: Erin Batth (4th season)
- Assistant coaches: Valerie Nainima; Molly Reagan; Sharon Baldwin; Elissa Cunane
- Home arena: Alumni Hall

2026–27 Big East women's basketball standings
	Conf.				Overall
Team	W		L	PCT	W		L	PCT
No. 7 UConn	1	–	0	1.000	4	–	2	.667
Butler	0	–	0	–	6	–	0	1.000
Xavier	0	–	0	–	4	–	0	1.000
DePaul	0	–	0	–	5	–	1	.833
Creighton	0	–	0	–	4	–	1	.800
St. John's	0	–	0	–	4	–	1	.800
Georgetown	0	–	0	–	4	–	2	.667
Marquette	0	–	0	–	3	–	2	.600
Villanova	0	–	0	–	3	–	2	.600
Providence	0	–	0	–	2	–	3	.400
Seton Hall	0	–	1	.000	2	–	4	.333
† 2027 Big East tournament winner As of November 21, 2026; Rankings from AP poll

The 2026–27 Providence Friars women's basketball team currently represent Providence College during the 2026–27 NCAA Division I women's basketball season. The Friars, led by fourth-year head coach Erin Batth, play their home games at Alumni Hall in Providence, Rhode Island and compete as a member of the Big East Conference.

== Previous season ==
The Friars finished the 2025–26 season 15–18 overall and 7–13 in Big East play, finishing seventh in the conference. As the No. 7 seed in the Big East tournament, they defeated No. 10 DePaul 69–55 in the first round, before falling to No. 2 Villanova 65–73 in the quarterfinals to end their season.

== Offseason ==
=== Departures ===
Providence departures
Name	Num.	Pos.	Height	Year	Hometown	Reason for departure
Sabou Gueye	0	Guard	5'9"	Graduate Student	Dakar, Senegal	Graduated
Nalani Kaysia	8	Forward	6'2"	Graduate Student	Washington, D.C.	Graduated
Austeja Babraitis	9	Forward	6'2"	Freshman	Kaunas, Lithuania	Transferred to Barry (D-II) (Note: Entered transfer portal on December 11, 2025 with an athletic aid acception.)
Sami Mancini	15	Forward-Center	6'4"	(redshirt) Freshman	Webb City, MO	Transferred to Utah State
Teneisia Brown	20	Forward	6'2"	Graduate Student	Montego Bay, Jamaica	Graduated
Eseosa Imafidon	22	Center	6'5"	Junior	Benin City, Nigeria	TBD; not listed on roster

=== Incoming transfers ===
Providence incoming transfers
Name	Num.	Pos.	Height	Year	Hometown	Previous school
Kylah Silver	4	Guard	5'10"	(redshirt) Junior	Greenville, NC	UNC Wilmington
J'Adore Young	5	Center-Forward	6'4"	(redshirt) Junior	Mauldin, SC	Ole Miss
Taylor Barner	8	Guard	5'9"	Sophomore	Cary, NC	East Carolina
Daviane Mindoudi	13	Guard	6'1"	Junior	Bilbao, Spain	Florida

=== Recruiting class ===
There was no 2026 recruiting class.

== Preseason ==
On October 1, 2026, the Big East Conference released its annual preseason coaches poll and awards. Providence was picked to finish seventh in the conference.

=== Preseason rankings ===
Big East Preseason Poll
Place	Team	Votes
1	UConn	100 (10)
2	Villanova	90 (1)
3	Creighton	78
4	St. John's	68
5	Seton Hall	67
6	Marquette	60
7	Providence	38
8	Georgetown	36
9	Xavier	29
10	Butler	21
11	DePaul	18
(#) first-place votes

=== Preseason All-Big East Team ===
No players were selected for the Preseason All-Big East Team.

=== Honorable Mentions ===
Honorable Mentions
Player	Year	Position
Orlagh Gormley	Junior	Guard

== Roster ==
2026–27 Providence Friars women's basketball team
Players
Coaches

Pos.	#	Name	Height	Year	Previous school	Hometown
G	1	Mariana Padilla	5 ft 5 in (1.65 m)	Jr	Dexter Southfield School	Newton, MA
G	2	Princess Moody	5 ft 8 in (1.73 m)	So	Bishop McNamara High School	La Plata, MD
G	3	Orlagh Gormley	5 ft 6 in (1.68 m)	Jr	Dexter Southfield School	Quincy, MA
G	4	Kylah Silver	5 ft 10 in (1.78 m)	RS Jr	D.H. Conley High School; UNC Wilmington	Greenville, NC
F/C	5	J'Adore Young	6 ft 4 in (1.93 m)	RS Jr	Greenville High School; Ole Miss	Mauldin, SC
G	8	Taylor Barner	5 ft 9 in (1.75 m)	So	Panther Creek High School; Ole Miss	Cary, NC
G/F	10	Audrey Shields	6 ft 1 in (1.85 m)	Jr	Emma Willard School	Troy, NY
G	11	Riley Hamburger	6 ft 0 in (1.83 m)	So	Paul VI Catholic High School	Aldie, VA
G	12	Olivia Rodrigues	6 ft 1 in (1.85 m)	RS Fr	Tabor Academy	New Bedford, MA
G	13	Daviane Mindoudi	6 ft 1 in (1.85 m)	Jr	Segle XXI; Florida	Bilbao, Spain
G	21	Payton Dunbar	6 ft 1 in (1.85 m)	Jr	Jefferson Christian; Virginia	Narrows, VA
F	23	Ashley Dinges	6 ft 1 in (1.85 m)	So	Noble and Greenough School	Haverhill, MA
F	32	Voldie Basana	6 ft 2 in (1.88 m)	Fr	Athens Christian School	Kinshasa, DR Congo
G	33	Sophi Hall	5 ft 11 in (1.8 m)	Sr	Holy Family High School	Carver, MN
C	55	Marlene Mbilima	6 ft 3 in (1.91 m)	Fr	Athens Christian School	Kinshasa, DR Congo

Head coach

- Erin Batth (Clemson)

Assistant coach(es)

- Valerie Nainima (South Carolina)
- Molly Reagan (Liberty)
- Sharon Baldwin (Georgia State)
- Elissa Cunane (NC State

Legend

- (C) Team captain
- (S) Suspended
- (I) Ineligible
- (W) Walk-on
- Injured
- Current redshirt

Roster
Last update: September 21, 2026

== Schedule and results ==
Date time, TV	Rank^{#}	Opponent^{#}	Result	Record	High points	High rebounds	High assists	Site (attendance) city, state
Exhibition
October 29, 2026*; 7:00 p.m.		Southern New Hampshire	W 101–49		28 – Dunbar	7 – Tied	5 – Mindoudi	Alumni Hall (597); Providence, RI
Regular season
November 3, 2026*; 7:00 p.m., ESPN+		Stonehill	W 79–65	1–0	21 – Moody	8 – Young	7 – Gormley	Alumni Hall (781); Providence, RI
November 7, 2026*; 1:00 p.m., ESPN+		UMass	L 50–60	1–1	10 – Silver	7 – Shields	2 – Tied	Alumni Hall (615); Providence, RI
November 11, 2026*; 7:00 p.m., ESPN+		Bryant	L 47–53	1–2	15 – Gormley	6 – Gormley	2 – Tied	Alumni Hall (830); Providence, RI
November 14, 2026*; 12:00 p.m., ACCNX		at Boston College	L 73–75	1–3	17 – Moody	6 – Young	3 – Gormley	Conte Forum (913); Chestnut Hill, MA
November 17, 2026*; 7:00 p.m., ESPN+		Northeastern	W 52–42	2–3	23 – Gormley	11 – Young	3 – Moody	Alumni Hall (565); Providence, RI
November 21, 2026*; 1:30 p.m., Peacock/NBCSN		No. 1 South Carolina	L 43–72	2–4	13 – Young	8 – Young	5 – Moody	Alumni Hall (1,578); Providence, RI
November 24, 2026*; 7:00 p.m., ESPN+		New Hampshire						Alumni Hall; Providence, RI
November 27, 2026*; 12:30 p.m.		vs. Binghamton; Puerto Rico Clasico						Coliseo Rubén Rodríguez; Bayamón, PR
November 28, 2026*; 12:00 p.m.		vs. George Mason; Puerto Rico Clasico						Coliseo Rubén Rodríguez; Bayamón, PR
December 4, 2026; 2:00 p.m., ESPN+		at St. John's						Carnesecca Arena; Queens, NY
December 7, 2026*; 6:00 p.m., ESPN+		at Rhode Island						Ryan Center; Kingston, RI
December 10, 2026; 11:00 a.m., ESPN+		Seton Hall						Alumni Hall; Providence, RI
December 12, 2026*; 1:00 p.m., ESPN+		UMass Lowell						Alumni Hall; Providence, RI
December 20, 2026; 1:00 p.m., ESPN+		Villanova						Alumni Hall; Providence, RI
December 23, 2026; 12:00 p.m., ESPN+		at Georgetown						McDonough Arena; Washington, D.C.
December 31, 2026; 1:00 p.m., ESPN+		Marquette						Alumni Hall; Providence, RI
January 3, 2027; 1:00 p.m., ESPN+		at Xavier						Cintas Center; Cincinnati, OH
January 6, 2027; 7:00 p.m., ESPN+		at Butler						Hinkle Fieldhouse; Indianapolis, IN
January 10, 2027; 1:00 p.m., ESPN+		St. John's						Alumni Hall; Providence, RI
January 17, 2027; 1:00 p.m., ESPN+		Creighton						Alumni Hall; Providence, RI
January 20, 2027; 7:00 p.m., ESPN+		at DePaul						Wintrust Arena; Chicago, IL
January 23, 2027; 2:00 p.m., ESPN+		at Villanova						Finneran Pavilion; Villanova, PA
January 27, 2027; 7:00 p.m., ESPN+		Butler						Alumni Hall; Providence, RI
January 31, 2027; 12:00 p.m., TNT		at UConn						PeoplesBank Arena; Hartford, CT
February 3, 2027; 7:00 p.m., ESPN+		Georgetown						Alumni Hall; Providence, RI
February 6, 2027; 1:00 p.m., ESPN+		Xavier						Alumni Hall; Providence, RI
February 11, 2027; 7:00 p.m., ESPN+		at Seton Hall						Walsh Gymnasium; South Orange, NJ
February 14, 2027; 1:00 p.m., ESPN+		DePaul						Alumni Hall; Providence, RI
February 18, 2027; 7:30 p.m., ESPN+		at Creighton						D. J. Sokol Arena; Omaha, NE
February 21, 2027; 4:00 p.m., ESPN+		at Marquette						Al McGuire Center; Milwaukee, WI
February 25, 2027; 7:00 p.m., TNT		UConn						Amica Mutual Pavilion; Providence, RI
Big East tournament
March 5–8, 2027; TBA		vs.						Mohegan Sun Arena; Uncasville, CT
*Non-conference game. ^{#}Rankings from AP Poll. (#) Tournament seedings in parentheses. All times are in Eastern.
