= 2026–27 Villanova Wildcats women's basketball team =

Intercollegiate basketball season

2026–27 Villanova Wildcats women's basketball
- Conference: Big East Conference
- Record: 3–2 (0–0 Big East)
- Head coach: Denise Dillon (7th season)
- Associate head coach: Joe Mullaney; Michelle Sword
- Assistant coaches: Tiara Malcom; Jess Genco
- Home arena: Finneran Pavilion

2026–27 Big East women's basketball standings
	Conf.				Overall
Team	W		L	PCT	W		L	PCT
Butler	0	–	0	–	6	–	0	1.000
Xavier	0	–	0	–	4	–	0	1.000
DePaul	0	–	0	–	5	–	1	.833
Creighton	0	–	0	–	4	–	1	.800
St. John's	0	–	0	–	4	–	1	.800
Georgetown	0	–	0	–	4	–	2	.667
Marquette	0	–	0	–	3	–	2	.600
No. 7 UConn	0	–	0	–	3	–	2	.600
Villanova	0	–	0	–	3	–	2	.600
Providence	0	–	0	–	2	–	3	.400
Seton Hall	0	–	0	–	2	–	3	.400
† 2027 Big East tournament winner As of November 20, 2026; Rankings from AP poll

The 2026–27 Villanova Wildcats women's basketball team currently represents Villanova University during the 2026–27 NCAA Division I women's basketball season. The Wildcats, led by seventh-year head coach Denise Dillon, play their home games at the Finneran Pavilion in Villanova, Pennsylvania, and compete as a member of the Big East Conference.

== Previous season ==
The Wildcats finished the 2025–26 season 25–8 overall and 16–4 in Big East play, to finish second in the conference. As the No. 2 seed in the Big East tournament, they earned a bye to the quarterfinals, where they defeated No. 7 Providence before moving onto the semifinals, beating No. 4 Seton Hall. They then moved onto the championship game for the first time since 2023 where they fell 51–90 to top-seeded and undefeated UConn.

Following the Big East tournament, the Wildcats earned an at-large bid to the NCAA tournament, where they were seeded No. 10 in the Sacramento #2 Regional. They lost 52–57 in the first round to No. 7 Texas Tech to end their season.

== Offseason ==
=== Departures ===
Villanova departures
Name	Number	Pos.	Height	Year	Hometown	Reason for departure
MD Ntambue	3	Guard	5'9"	Frehsman	Montreal, QC	Transferred to Loyola Chicago
Kylee Watson	4	Forward	6'4"	Graduate Student	Linwood, NJ	Graduated
Ryanne Allen	5	Guard	6'1"	Senior	Perkasie, PA	Graduated
Denae Carter	25	Forward	6'0"	Senior	Philadelphia, PA	Graduated
Annie Welde	43	Forward	6'0"	Senior	Havertown, PA	Graduated
Maggie Grant	44	Guard	6'0"	Senior	Downingtown, PA	Graduated

=== Incoming transfers ===
Villanova incoming transfers
Name	Number	Pos.	Height	Year	Hometown	Previous school
Simone Pelish	2	Guard	6'0"	Sophomore	Poughkeepsie, NY	Miami (FL)
Anna Foley	33	Forward	6'3"	Senior	Andover, MA	Quinnipiac

=== Recruiting class ===
There was no 2026 recruiting class.

== Preseason ==
On October 1, 2026, the Big East Conference released its annual preseason coaches poll and awards. Villanova was once again picked to finish second in the conference.

=== Preseason rankings ===
Big East Preseason Poll
Place	Team	Votes
1	UConn	100 (10)
2	Villanova	90 (1)
3	Creighton	78
4	St. John's	68
5	Seton Hall	67
6	Marquette	60
7	Providence	38
8	Georgetown	36
9	Xavier	29
10	Butler	21
11	DePaul	18
(#) first-place votes

=== Preseason All-Big East Team ===
Preseason All-Big East Team
Player	Year	Position
Jasmine Bascoe	Junior	Guard
Kennedy Henry	Sophomore	Guard

=== Honorable Mentions ===
No players were named Big East preseason honorable mentions.

== Roster ==
2026–27 Villanova Wildcats women's basketball team
Players
Coaches

Pos.	#	Name	Height	Year	Previous school	Hometown
G	2	Simone Pelish	6 ft 0 in (1.83 m)	So	Our Lady of Lourdes High School; Miami (FL)	Poughkeepsie, NY
G	11	Jasmine Bascoe	5 ft 7 in (1.7 m)	Jr	King's Christian Collegiate	Milton, ON
G	12	EJ Bender	6 ft 1 in (1.85 m)	RS Fr	Anthony Wayne High School	Whitehouse, OH
F	13	Brynn McCurry (injured)	6 ft 1 in (1.85 m)	Sr	Sparta High School	Sparta, NJ
G	14	Brooke Bender	6 ft 1 in (1.85 m)	So	Anthony Wayne High School	Whitehouse, OH
F	21	Janet Oriakhi	6 ft 0 in (1.83 m)	Fr	BORG Monsberger	Graz, Austria
G	22	Kennedy Henry	6 ft 0 in (1.83 m)	So	Westtown School	Hockessin, DE
G	23	Kelsey Joens	5 ft 10 in (1.78 m)	Sr	West Liberty High School; Iowa State	Iowa City, IA
G	24	Dani Ceseretti	6 ft 0 in (1.83 m)	Jr	Northfield Mount Hermon School	Barrington, RI
F	33	Anna Foley	6 ft 3 in (1.91 m)	Sr	Andover High School; Quinnipiac	Andover, MA
G	34	Alexis Eberz	5 ft 10 in (1.78 m)	Fr	Archbishop John Carroll High School	Havertown, PA
F	45	Rachel Wirts	6 ft 3 in (1.91 m)	Jr	Center Grove High School	Greenwood, IN
G	52	Miky Panait	5 ft 7 in (1.7 m)	So	Spiru Haret High School	Bucharest, Romania

Head coach

- Denise Dillon (Villanova)

Assistant coach(es)

- Joe Mullaney (Providence)
- Michelle Sword (Saint Joseph's)
- Tiara Malcom (Delaware)
- Jess Genco (Northeastern)

Legend

- (C) Team captain
- (S) Suspended
- (I) Ineligible
- (W) Walk-on
- Injured
- Current redshirt

Roster
Last update: September 19, 2026

== Schedule and results ==
Date time, TV	Rank^{#}	Opponent^{#}	Result	Record	High points	High rebounds	High assists	Site (attendance) city, state
Exhibition
October 18, 2026*; 2:00 p.m.		Fairleigh Dickinson	W 68–45		14 – Bascoe	7 – Henry	6 – Bascoe	Finneran Pavilion (1,531); Villanova, PA
Regular season
November 1, 2026*; 12:00 p.m., FS1		vs. No. 13 Notre Dame; Eternal City Tip-Off	L 75–99	0–1	26 – Bascoe	7 – EJ Bender	9 – Bascoe	Palazzetto dello Sport; Rome, Italy
November 10, 2026*; 7:00 p.m., ESPN+/NBCSP		at Princeton	L 74–81	0–2	22 – Bascoe	6 – EJ Bender	4 – Ceseretti	Jadwin Gymnasium (651); Princeton, NJ
November 12, 2026*; 7:00 p.m., ESPN+		Merrimack	W 97–44	1–2	26 – Bascoe	11 – Pelish	7 – Bascoe	Finneran Pavilion (1,783); Villanova, PA
November 15, 2026*; 2:00 p.m., ESPN+		at Fairfield	W 67–56	2–2	18 – Henry	6 – Tied	4 – Bascoe	Leo D. Mahoney Arena (1,706); Fairfield, CT
November 18, 2026*; 7:00 p.m., ESPN+		Towson	W 62–59	3–2	20 – Bascoe	7 – Bascoe	8 – Bascoe	Finneran Pavilion (1,791); Villanova, PA
November 24, 2026*; 11:00 a.m., ESPN+		La Salle; Big 5 Women's Classic Pod 2						Finneran Pavilion; Villanova, PA
November 27, 2026*; 4:30 p.m., ION		vs. LSU; Fort Myers Tip-Off Island Division						Suncoast Credit Union Arena; Fort Myers, FL
November 28, 2026*; 7:00 p.m., ION		vs. Kansas State; Fort Myers Tip-Off Island Division						Suncoast Credit Union Arena; Fort Myers, FL
December 1, 2026*; TBA		at Temple; Big 5 Women's Classic Pod 2						Liacouras Center; Philadelphia, PA
December 3, 2026; 7:00 p.m., ESPN+		DePaul						Finneran Pavilion; Villanova, PA
December 6, 2026*; TBA		vs. TBD; Big 5 Women's Classic						The Palestra; Philadelphia, PA
December 10, 2026; 9:00 p.m., TruTV		at Marquette						Al McGuire Center; Milwaukee, WI
December 12, 2026*; 6:00 p.m., ESPN+		West Virginia						Finneran Pavilion; Villanova, PA
December 20, 2026; 1:00 p.m., ESPN+		at Providence						Alumni Hall; Providence, RI
December 23, 2026; 1:00 p.m., Peacock/NBCSN		UConn						Finneran Pavilion; Villanova, PA
December 30, 2026; 7:00 p.m., ESPN+		Georgetown						Finneran Pavilion; Villanova, PA
January 2, 2027; 2:00 p.m., ESPN+		at St. John's						Carnesecca Arena; Queens, NY
January 7, 2027; 8:00 p.m., Peacock/NBCSN		at Creighton						D. J. Sokol Arena; Omaha, NE
January 10, 2027; 2:00 p.m., ESPN+		Xavier						Finneran Pavilion; Villanova, PA
January 13, 2027; 7:00 p.m., ESPN+		Butler						Finneran Pavilion; Villanova, PA
January 20, 2027; 11:00 a.m., ESPN+		at Georgetown						McDonough Arena; Washington, D.C.
January 23, 2027; 2:00 p.m., ESPN+		Providence						Finneran Pavilion; Villanova, PA
January 28, 2027; 8:30 p.m., FS1		St. John's						Finneran Pavilion; Villanova, PA
January 31, 2027; 1:00 p.m., ESPN+		at Xavier						Cintas Center; Cincinnati, OH
February 4, 2027; 9:00 p.m., TruTV		at DePaul						Wintrust Arena; Chicago, IL
February 7, 2027; 12:30 p.m., TNT		Seton Hall						Finneran Pavilion; Villanova, PA
February 10, 2027; 6:00 p.m., Peacock/NBCSN		at UConn						Harry A. Gampel Pavilion; Storrs, CT
February 13, 2027; 2:00 p.m., ESPN+		at Butler						Hinkle Fieldhouse; Indianapolis, IN
February 18, 2027; 8:00 p.m., Peacock/NBCSN		Marquette						Finneran Pavilion; Villanova, PA
February 21, 2027; 2:00 p.m., TruTV		Creighton						Finneran Pavilion; Villanova, PA
February 27, 2027; 5:00 p.m., Peacock/NBCSN		at Seton Hall						Walsh Gymnasium; South Orange, NJ
Big East tournament
March 5–8, 2027; TBA		vs.						Mohegan Sun Arena; Uncasville, CT
*Non-conference game. ^{#}Rankings from AP Poll. (#) Tournament seedings in parentheses. All times are in Eastern.
