= 2026–27 Seton Hall Pirates women's basketball team =

Intercollegiate basketball season

2026–27 Seton Hall Pirates women's basketball
- Conference: Big East Conference
- Record: 2–4 (0–1 Big East)
- Head coach: Anthony Bozzella (14th season)
- Assistant coaches: Jose Rebimbas; Cassandra Callaway; Ka-Deidre Simmons
- Home arena: Walsh Gymnasium

2026–27 Big East women's basketball standings
	Conf.				Overall
Team	W		L	PCT	W		L	PCT
No. 7 UConn	1	–	0	1.000	4	–	2	.667
Butler	0	–	0	–	6	–	0	1.000
Xavier	0	–	0	–	4	–	0	1.000
DePaul	0	–	0	–	5	–	1	.833
Creighton	0	–	0	–	4	–	1	.800
St. John's	0	–	0	–	4	–	1	.800
Georgetown	0	–	0	–	4	–	2	.667
Marquette	0	–	0	–	3	–	2	.600
Villanova	0	–	0	–	3	–	2	.600
Providence	0	–	0	–	2	–	3	.400
Seton Hall	0	–	1	.000	2	–	4	.333
† 2027 Big East tournament winner As of November 21, 2026; Rankings from AP poll

The 2026–27 Seton Hall Pirates women's basketball team currently represents Seton Hall University during the 2026–27 NCAA Division I women's basketball season. The Pirates, led by fourteenth-year head coach Anthony Bozzella, play their home games at the Walsh Gymnasium in South Orange, New Jersey, and compete as a members of the Big East Conference

== Previous season ==
The Pirates finished the 2025–26 season 19–13 overall and 12–8 in Big East play, finishing in a tie for third in the conference with Marquette. As the No. 3 seed in the Big East tournament, they earned a bye to the quarterfinals where they narrowly defeated No. 6 St. John's 63–61 to advance to the semifinals, where they fell 48–62 to No. 2 Villanova.

Following the Big East tournament, the Pirates earned an at-large bid to the WBIT, making it their third straight appearance in the tournament. They were unseeded in the BYU Bracket. They lost in the first round 57–67 to No. 4 seeded Missouri to end their season.

== Offseason ==
=== Departures ===
Seton Hall departures
Name	Number	Pos.	Height	Year	Hometown	Reason for departure
Jada Eads	0	Guard	5'7"	Sophomore	Orlando, FL	Transferred to Tennessee
Natalia Hall-Rosa	3	Guard/Forward	6'0"	Freshman	Randolph, MA	Transferred to Boston College
Mariana Valenzuela	6	Forward	6'2"	Senior	Mazatlan, Mexico	Graduated
Zahara Bishop	8	Guard	6'0"	Freshman	Minneapolis, MN	Transferred to Auburn
Cam Rust	10	Forward	6'1"	Sophomore	Wakefield, RI	Transferred to George Washington
Messiah Hunter	13	Forward	6'2"	Senior	Hopewell, VA	Graduated
Jordana Codio	23	Guard	6'1"	Senior	Winter Garden, FL	Transferred to Georgia
Trishay Collins	24	Forward	6'1"	Freshman	Palm Bay, FL	Transferred to West Georgia (Note: Did not play in the 2025–26 season.)

=== Incoming transfers ===
Seton Hall incoming transfers
Name	Number	Pos.	Height	Year	Hometown	Previous school
Saniyah King	0	Guard	5'7"	Junior	Washington, D.C.	Mississippi State
Samari Bankhead	3	Guard	6'0"	Sophomore	Los Angeles, CA	UCF
Jada Crawshaw	23	Forward	6'0"	Senior	Darwin, Australia	Georgia Tech

=== Recruiting class ===
College recruiting
Name	Hometown	School	Height	Weight	Commit date
Inieye Oruh; P	Las Vegas, NV	Centennial High School	6 ft 4 in (1.93 m)	N/A	
Inieye Oruh; P	Recruit ratings: Rivals: ESPN: (91)				
Overall recruit ranking:
Note: In many cases, Scout, Rivals, 247Sports, On3, and ESPN may conflict in their listings of height and weight.; In these cases, the average was taken. ESPN grades are on a 100-point scale.; Sources: "2026 Player Commits". ESPN. Archived from the original on September 21, 2026.

== Preseason ==
On October 1, 2026, the Big East Conference released its annual preseason coaches poll and awards. Seton Hall was picked to finish fifth in the conference.

=== Preseason rankings ===
Big East Preseason Poll
Place	Team	Votes
1	UConn	100 (10)
2	Villanova	90 (1)
3	Creighton	78
4	St. John's	68
5	Seton Hall	67
6	Marquette	60
7	Providence	38
8	Georgetown	36
9	Xavier	29
10	Butler	21
11	DePaul	18
(#) first-place votes

=== Preseason All-Big East Team ===
Preseason All-Big East Team
Player	Year	Position
Savannah Catalon	Senior	Guard

=== Honorable Mentions ===
No players were named Big East preseason honorable mentions.

== Roster ==
2026–27 Seton Hall Pirates women's basketball team
Players
Coaches

Pos.	#	Name	Height	Year	Previous school	Hometown
G	0	Saniyah King	5 ft 7 in (1.7 m)	Jr	Bishop Ireton High School; Mississippi State	Washington, D.C.
G	1	Ari Woodward	5 ft 8 in (1.73 m)	So	Lake Highland Prep	Oviedo, FL
G	2	Ja'Kahla Craft	5 ft 9 in (1.75 m)	Jr	St. Michael-Albertville High School	Elk River, MN
G	3	Samari Bankhead	6 ft 0 in (1.83 m)	So	Windward High School; UCF	Los Angeles, CA
F/C	4	Savanna Jones	6 ft 2 in (1.88 m)	Sr	Eden Prairie High School; NDSCS	Eden Prairie, MN
G	5	Savannah Catalon	5 ft 8 in (1.73 m)	Sr	Mansfield Legacy High School	Burleson, TX
G	7	Giselle Dollar	5 ft 6 in (1.68 m)	Fr	Roosevelt High School	Seattle, WA
G	13	Ari Vidales	5 ft 10 in (1.78 m)	Fr	Life Prep Academy	Monterrey, Mexico
F	20	Inieye Oruh	6 ft 4 in (1.93 m)	Fr	Centennial High School	Las Vegas, NV
G/F	21	Shailyn Pinkey	5 ft 10 in (1.78 m)	GS	East Hartford High School	East Hartford, CT
F	23	Jada Crawshaw	6 ft 0 in (1.83 m)	Sr	Georgia Tech	Darwin, Australia
F	25	Ksenija Scepanovic	6 ft 4 in (1.93 m)	GS	JU Braca Selic	Kolasin, Montenegro
F	25	Shamira Morton	6 ft 3 in (1.91 m)	Fr	Canton High School	Canton, MS
G/F	35	Jada Snow	5 ft 10 in (1.78 m)	So	Sanford School	Bear, DE
C	44	Kenadie Maughan	6 ft 5 in (1.96 m)	Fr	Uintah High School	Vernal, UT

Head coach

- Anthony Bozzella (Seton Hall)

Assistant coach(es)

- Jose Rebimbas (Seton Hall)
- Cassandra Callaway (Albany)
- Ka-Deidre Simmons (Seton Hall)

Legend

- (C) Team captain
- (S) Suspended
- (I) Ineligible
- (W) Walk-on
- Injured
- Current redshirt

Roster
Last update: September 21, 2026

== Schedule and results ==
Date time, TV	Rank^{#}	Opponent^{#}	Result	Record	High points	High rebounds	High assists	Site (attendance) city, state
Exhibition
October 29, 2026*; 7:00 p.m.		Jefferson	W 76–48		18 – Craft	7 – Craft	7 – King	Walsh Gymnasium; South Orange, NJ
Regular season
November 3, 2026*; 7:00 p.m., ESPN+		Mercyhurst	W 63–37	1–0	22 – Woodard	5 – Tied	7 – Scepanovic	Walsh Gymnasium (514); South Orange, NJ
November 6, 2026*; 11:30 a.m., ESPN+		Indiana State	W 74–56	2–0	25 – Craft	12 – Craft	4 – Tied	Walsh Gymnasium (477); South Orange, NJ
November 12, 2026*; 7:00 p.m., ESPN+		Fairfield	L 67–69	2–1	29 – Catalon	7 – Tied	2 – Tied	Walsh Gymnasium (454); South Orange, NJ
November 15, 2026*; 1:00 p.m., ESPN+		NC State	L 54–75	2–2	18 – Catalon	7 – Morton	7 – Catalon	Walsh Gymnasium (709); South Orange, NJ
November 17, 2026*; 7:00 p.m., SECN+/ESPN+		at Auburn	L 55–64	2–3	16 – Catalon	7 – Catalon	5 – Catalon	Neville Arena (2,457); Auburn, AL
November 20, 2026; 8:00 p.m., Peacock/NBCSN		at No. 7 UConn	L 43–83	2–4 (0–1)	14 – Catalon	5 – Tied	4 – Scepanovic	PeoplesBank Arena (10,267); Hartford, CT
November 23, 2026*; 7:00 p.m., ESPN+		Rider						Walsh Gymnasium; South Orange, NJ
November 27, 2026*; 8:00 p.m., ESPN+		vs. South Florida; Paradise Jam Reef Division semifinal						UVI Sports and Fitness Center; Charlotte Amalie, USVI
November 28, 2026*; 5:30 or 8:00 p.m., ESPN+		vs. Baylor or Penn State; Paradise Jam Reef Division						UVI Sports and Fitness Center; Charlotte Amalie, USVI
December 2, 2026*; 7:00 p.m., ESPN+		Princeton						Walsh Gymnasium; South Orange, NJ
December 4, 2026; 7:00 p.m., ESPN+		at Butler						Hinkle Fieldhouse; Indianapolis, IN
December 8, 2026*; 6:00 p.m., BTN		at Rutgers						Jersey Mike's Arena; Piscataway, NJ
December 10, 2026; 11:00 a.m., ESPN+		at Providence						Alumni Hall; Providence, RI
December 13, 2026*; 2:00 p.m.		at Columbia						Levien Gymnasium; New York, NY
December 19, 2026*; 1:00 p.m., ESPN+		Wagner						Walsh Gymnasium; South Orange, NJ
December 23, 2026; 12:00 p.m., ESPN+		Xavier						Walsh Gymnasium; South Orange, NJ
December 30, 2026; 1:00 p.m., ESPN+		Creighton						Walsh Gymnasium; South Orange, NJ
January 3, 2027; 3:00 p.m., ESPN+		at Marquette						Al McGuire Center; Milwaukee, WI
January 7, 2027; 7:00 p.m., ESPN+		DePaul						Walsh Gymnasium; South Orange, NJ
January 10, 2027; 1:00 p.m., ESPN+		Butler						Walsh Gymnasium; South Orange, NJ
January 13, 2027; 7:00 p.m., ESPN+		at Georgetown						McDonough Arena; Washington, D.C.
January 18, 2027; 2:30 p.m., FOX		UConn; Coretta Scott King Classic						Prudential Center; Newark, NJ
January 23, 2027; 1:00 p.m., ESPN+		Marquette						Walsh Gymnasium; South Orange, NJ
January 27, 2027; 6:30 p.m., ESPN+		at Xavier						Cintas Center; Cincinnati, OH
January 31, 2027; 2:00 p.m., ESPN+		at Creighton						D. J. Sokol Arena; Omaha, NE
February 4, 2027; 6:30 p.m., Peacock/NBCSN		St. John's						Walsh Gymnasium; South Orange, NJ
February 7, 2027; 12:30 p.m., TNT		at Villanova						Finneran Pavilion; Villanova, PA
February 11, 2027; 7:00 p.m., ESPN+		Providence						Walsh Gymnasium; South Orange, NJ
February 14, 2027; 1:00 p.m., ESPN+		Georgetown						Walsh Gymnasium; South Orange, NJ
February 17, 2027; 7:00 p.m., ESPN+		at DePaul						Wintrust Arena; Chicago, IL
February 24, 2027; 7:00 p.m., TruTV		at St. John's						Carnesecca Arena; Queens, NY
February 27, 2027; 5:00 p.m., Peacock/NBCSN		Villanova						Walsh Gymnasium; South Orange, NJ
Big East tournament
March 5–8, 2027; TBA		vs.						Mohegan Sun Arena; Uncasville, CT
*Non-conference game. ^{#}Rankings from AP Poll. (#) Tournament seedings in parentheses. All times are in Eastern.
