= 2026–27 St. John's Red Storm women's basketball team =

American college basketball season

2026–27 St. John's Red Storm women's basketball
- Conference: Big East Conference
- Record: 4–1 (0–0 Big East)
- Head coach: Joe Tartamella (15th season)
- Associate head coach: Steve Pogue
- Assistant coaches: Venessa Abel; Joe Rutigliano
- Home arena: Carnesecca Arena

2026–27 Big East women's basketball standings
| | Conf. | | | | Overall |
| Team | W | | L | PCT | W | | L | PCT |
|---|---|---|---|---|---|---|---|---|
| Butler | 0 | – | 0 | – | 5 | – | 0 | 1.000 |
| St. John's | 0 | – | 0 | – | 4 | – | 0 | 1.000 |
| Xavier | 0 | – | 0 | – | 4 | – | 0 | 1.000 |
| DePaul | 0 | – | 0 | – | 4 | – | 1 | .800 |
| Georgetown | 0 | – | 0 | – | 4 | – | 1 | .800 |
| Creighton | 0 | – | 0 | – | 3 | – | 1 | .750 |
| Marquette | 0 | – | 0 | – | 3 | – | 2 | .600 |
| No. 7 UConn | 0 | – | 0 | – | 3 | – | 2 | .600 |
| Villanova | 0 | – | 0 | – | 2 | – | 2 | .500 |
| Providence | 0 | – | 0 | – | 2 | – | 3 | .400 |
| Seton Hall | 0 | – | 0 | – | 2 | – | 3 | .400 |
† 2027 Big East tournament winner As of November 19, 2026; Rankings from AP poll

The 2026–27 St. John's Red Storm women's basketball team will represent St. John's University during the 2026–27 NCAA Division I women's basketball season. The Red Storm, led by fifteenth-year head coach Joe Tartamella, will primarily (Note: The Red Storm will host UConn at Madison Square Garden on January 24.) play their games at Carnesecca Arena in Queens, New York, and will compete as a member of the Big East Conference.

== Previous season ==
The Red Storm finished the 2025–26 season 22–12 overall and 11–9 in Big East play, finishing in a tie for fifth in the conference with Creighton. As the No. 6 seed in the Big East tournament, they earned a bye to the quarterfinals where they lost 61–63 to No. 3 Seton Hall.

Following the Big East tournament, the Red Storm earned an at-large bid to the WBIT, making it their second appearance since they participated in the inaugural tournament in 2024. They were unseeded in the North Dakota State Bracket. They lost 26–74 in the first round to eventual champions No. 4 seeded Columbia to end their season, making it their lowest scoring game of the season, as well as one of their lowest in program history.

== Offseason ==
=== Departures ===
St. John's departures
| Name | Number | Pos. | Height | Year | Hometown | Reason for departure |
|---|---|---|---|---|---|---|
| Beautiful Waheed | 1 | Guard | 5'10" | Junior | Milwaukee, WI | Transferred to Alabama |
| Ariel Little | 3 | Guard | 5'4" | Sophomore | Brooklyn, NY | Transferred to Stony Brook |
| Skye Owen | 4 | Guard | 5'7" | Senior | Staten Island, NY | Graduated, transferred to Florida |
| Jaliah Donald | 5 | Guard | 5'7" | Senior | Inglewood, CA | Graduated |
| Shaulana Wagner | 8 | Guard | 5'10" | Graduate Student | Detroit, MI | Graduated |
| Kyla Hayes | 12 | Forward | 6'0" | Freshman | Buffalo, NY | Transferred to St. Bonaventure |
| Kylie Lavelle | 14 | Forward | 6'2" | Senior | Moosic, PA | Graduated |

=== Incoming transfers ===
St. John's incoming transfers
| Name | Number | Pos. | Height | Year | Hometown | Previous school |
|---|---|---|---|---|---|---|
| Asia Donald | 1 | Guard | 5'9" | Junior | Hobart, IN | West Georgia |
| Olivia Tucker | 4 | Guard | 5'7" | Junior | Durham, NC | Campbell |
| Sanaa Tripp | 5 | Guard | 5'7" | Junior | Covington, GA | Belmont |
| Reina Green | 8 | Guard | 5'9" | Senior | Fort Lauderdale, FL | Duquesne |

=== Recruiting class ===
College recruiting
| Name | Hometown | School | Height | Weight | Commit date |
|---|---|---|---|---|---|
| Syvannah Dawson; G | Richmond, VA | S3 Academy | 5 ft 9 in (1.75 m) | N/A | |
| Syvannah Dawson; G | Recruit ratings: ESPN: (91) | | | | |
Overall recruit ranking:
Note: In many cases, Scout, Rivals, 247Sports, On3, and ESPN may conflict in their listings of height and weight.; In these cases, the average was taken. ESPN grades are on a 100-point scale.; Sources: "2026 Player Commits". ESPN. Archived from the original on September 22, 2026.

== Preseason ==
On October 1, 2026, the Big East Conference released its annual preseason coaches poll and awards. St. John's was picked to finish fourth in the conference.

=== Preseason rankings ===
Big East Preseason Poll
| Place | Team | Votes |
|---|---|---|
| 1 | UConn | 100 (10) |
| 2 | Villanova | 90 (1) |
| 3 | Creighton | 78 |
| 4 | St. John's | 68 |
| 5 | Seton Hall | 67 |
| 6 | Marquette | 60 |
| 7 | Providence | 38 |
| 8 | Georgetown | 36 |
| 9 | Xavier | 29 |
| 10 | Butler | 21 |
| 11 | DePaul | 18 |
(#) first-place votes

=== Preseason All-Big East Team ===
Preseason All-Big East Team
| Player | Year | Position |
|---|---|---|
| Brooke Moore | Senior | Guard |
| Sa'Mya Wyatt | Junior | Forward |

=== Honorable Mentions ===
No players were named Big East preseason honorable mentions.

== Roster ==
Years are listed according to the new NCAA age-based eligibility model.

2026–27 St. John's Red Storm women's basketball team
Players
Coaches

| Pos. | # | Name | Height | Year | Previous school | Hometown |
|---|---|---|---|---|---|---|
| G | 1 | Asia Donald | 5 ft 9 in (1.75 m) | Jr | Hobart High School; West Georgia | Hobart, IN |
| F | 2 | Julie Bahati | 6 ft 2 in (1.88 m) | Sr | Springfield Central High School | Nairobi, Kenya |
| G | 3 | Syvannah Dawson | 5 ft 9 in (1.75 m) | Fr | S3 Academy | Richmond, VA |
| G | 4 | Olivia Tucker | 5 ft 7 in (1.7 m) | Jr | Panther Creek High School; Campbell | Durham, NC |
| G | 5 | Sanaa Tripp | 5 ft 7 in (1.7 m) | Jr | Newton High School; Belmont | Covington, GA |
| F | 7 | Yohana Fami | 6 ft 1 in (1.85 m) | Fr | Royal Crown School | Montreal, QC |
| G | 8 | Reina Green | 5 ft 9 in (1.75 m) | Sr | St. Thomas Aquinas High School; Belmont | Fort Lauderdale, FL |
| G | 10 | Brooke Moore | 6 ft 0 in (1.83 m) | Sr | North Cobb Christian School; Liberty | Kennesaw, GA |
| G | 11 | Janeya Grant | 6 ft 0 in (1.83 m) | Jr | South Shore Christian Academy | Middletown, CT |
| F | 16 | Daniela Ables | 6 ft 0 in (1.83 m) | GS | Colegio Salesianos San Bartolomé; Wichita State | Málaga, Spain |
| F | 20 | Sa'Mya Wyatt | 5 ft 11 in (1.8 m) | Jr | Saint Francis School; Austin Peay | Powder Springs, GA |
| F | 33 | Serenity Lancaster | 6 ft 1 in (1.85 m) | Fr | New Hampton School | New London, CT |

Head coach

- Joe Tartamella (James Madison)

Assistant coach(es)

- Steve Pogue (Nyack)
- Venessa Abel (Duquesne)
- Joe Rutigliano (Canisius)

Legend

- (C) Team captain
- (S) Suspended
- (I) Ineligible
- (W) Walk-on
- Injured
- Current redshirt

Roster
Last update: September 22, 2026

== Schedule and results ==
| Date time, TV | Rank^{#} | Opponent^{#} | Result | Record | High points | High rebounds | High assists | Site (attendance) city, state |
Regular season
| November 2, 2026*; 2:00 p.m., ESPN+ | | Lafayette | W 95–37 | 1–0 | 19 – Pryor | 6 – Tied | 4 – Pryor | Carnesecca Arena (346); Queens, NY |
| November 7, 2026*; 1:00 p.m., ESPN+ | | Wagner | W 102–33 | 2–0 | 14 – Moore | 7 – Moore | 4 – Tucker | Carnesecca Arena (436); Queens, NY |
| November 11, 2026*; 2:00 p.m., ESPN+ | | Quinnipiac | W 73–52 | 3–0 | 19 – Tucker | 7 – Fami | 11 – Pryor | Carnesecca Arena (453); Queens, NY |
| November 14, 2026*; 2:00 p.m., ESPN+ | | Rhode Island | W 68–51 | 4–0 | 20 – Wyatt | 13 – Abies | 7 – Pryor | Carnesecca Arena (386); Queens, NY |
| November 18, 2026*; 7:30 p.m., ESPN+ | | at No. 25 Oklahoma State | L 63–77 | 4–1 | 19 – Moore | 6 – Moore | 5 – Pryor | Gallagher-Iba Arena (2,674); Stillwater, OK |
| November 24, 2026*; 5:00 p.m., Peacock/NBCSN | | vs. UCLA; Basketball Hall of Fame Women's Showcase | | | | | | Mohegan Sun Arena; Uncasville, CT |
| November 27, 2026*; 2:30 p.m., ESPN+ | | vs. Richmond; 4 Tha Culture Holiday Hoops Classic | | | | | | Henrico Sports & Events Center; Richmond, VA |
| November 28, 2026*; 2:30 p.m., ESPN+ | | vs. Dayton; 4 Tha Culture Holiday Hoops Classic | | | | | | Henrico Sports & Events Center; Richmond, VA |
| December 4, 2026; 2:00 p.m., ESPN+ | | Providence | | | | | | Carnesecca Arena; Queens, NY |
| December 6, 2026; 1:00 p.m., ESPN+ | | at Xavier | | | | | | Cintas Center; Cincinnati, OH |
| December 10, 2026; 7:00 p.m., TruTV | | Georgetown | | | | | | Carnesecca Arena; Queens, NY |
| December 13, 2026*; 2:00 p.m., ESPN+ | | Temple | | | | | | Carnesecca Arena; Queens, NY |
| December 16, 2026*; 6:00 p.m., ESPN+ | | Dartmouth | | | | | | Carnesecca Arena; Queens, NY |
| December 20, 2026; 3:00 p.m., ESPN+ | | at Marquette | | | | | | Al McGuire Center; Milwaukee, WI |
| December 22, 2026*; 1:00 p.m., ESPN+ | | New Haven | | | | | | Carnesecca Arena; Queens, NY |
| December 30, 2026; 6:00 p.m., ESPN+ | | at Butler | | | | | | Hinkle Fieldhouse; Indianapolis, IN |
| January 2, 2027; 2:00 p.m., TNT | | Villanova | | | | | | Carnesecca Arena; Queens, NY |
| January 7, 2027; 7:00 p.m., ESPN+ | | Xavier | | | | | | Carnesecca Arena; Queens, NY |
| January 10, 2027; 1:00 p.m., ESPN+ | | at Providence | | | | | | Alumni Hall; Providence, RI |
| January 14, 2027; 7:30 p.m., ESPN+ | | at Creighton | | | | | | D. J. Sokol Arena; Omaha, NE |
| January 17, 2027; 2:00 p.m., ESPN+ | | DePaul | | | | | | Carnesecca Arena; Queens, NY |
| January 24, 2027; 12:00 p.m., TNT | | UConn | | | | | | Madison Square Garden; New York, NY |
| January 28, 2027; 8:30 p.m., FS1 | | at Villanova | | | | | | Finneran Pavilion; Villanova, PA |
| January 31, 2027; 2:00 p.m., ESPN+ | | Marquette | | | | | | Carnesecca Arena; Queens, NY |
| February 4, 2027; 6:30 p.m., Peacock/NBCSN | | at Seton Hall | | | | | | Walsh Gymnasium; South Orange, NJ |
| February 7, 2027; 3:00 p.m., ESPN+ | | at DePaul | | | | | | Wintrust Arena; Chicago, IL |
| February 14, 2027; 11:00 a.m., TruTV | | Creighton | | | | | | Carnesecca Arena; Queens, NY |
| February 18, 2027; 7:00 p.m., ESPN+ | | Butler | | | | | | Carnesecca Arena; Queens, NY |
| February 21, 2027; 12:00 p.m., FS1 | | at UConn | | | | | | PeoplesBank Arena; Hartford, CT |
| February 24, 2027; 7:00 p.m., TruTV | | Seton Hall | | | | | | Carnesecca Arena; Queens, NY |
| February 27, 2027; 2:00 p.m., ESPN+ | | at Georgetown | | | | | | McDonough Arena; Washington, D.C. |
Big East tournament
| March 5–8, 2027; TBA | | vs. | | | | | | Mohegan Sun Arena; Uncasville, CT |
*Non-conference game. ^{#}Rankings from AP Poll. (#) Tournament seedings in parentheses. All times are in Eastern.
