= 2026–27 Marquette Golden Eagles women's basketball team =

Intercollegiate basketball season

2026–27 Marquette Golden Eagles women's basketball
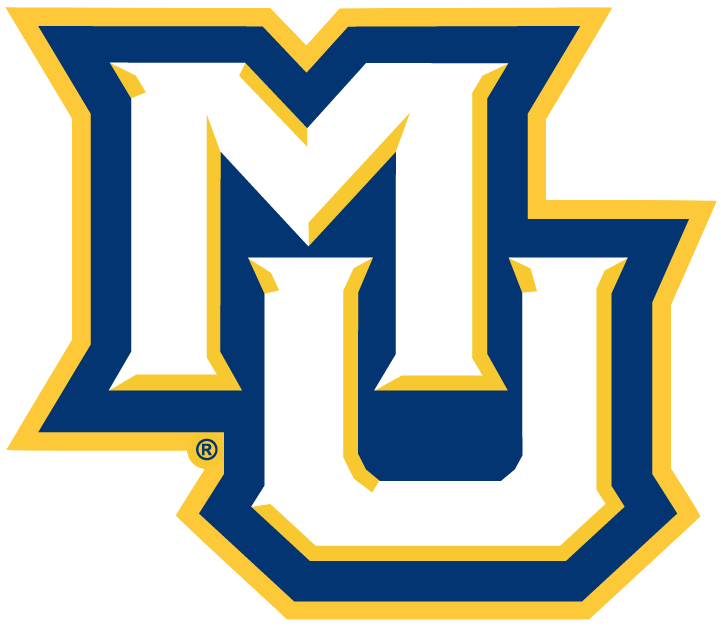
- Conference: Big East Conference
- Record: 4–2 (0–0 Big East)
- Head coach: Cara Consuegra (3rd season)
- Assistant coaches: Deont'a McChester; Sheila Boykin; Joe Silvestri; Sam Logic; Michael Garven
- Home arena: Al McGuire Center

2026–27 Big East women's basketball standings
	Conf.				Overall
Team	W		L	PCT	W		L	PCT
No. 7 UConn	1	–	0	1.000	4	–	2	.667
Butler	0	–	0	–	6	–	0	1.000
DePaul	0	–	0	–	6	–	1	.857
Creighton	0	–	0	–	4	–	1	.800
St. John's	0	–	0	–	4	–	1	.800
Xavier	0	–	0	–	4	–	1	.800
Georgetown	0	–	0	–	4	–	2	.667
Marquette	0	–	0	–	4	–	2	.667
Villanova	0	–	0	–	3	–	2	.600
Providence	0	–	0	–	2	–	4	.333
Seton Hall	0	–	1	.000	2	–	4	.333
† 2027 Big East tournament winner As of November 22, 2026; Rankings from AP poll

The 2026–27 Marquette Golden Eagles women's basketball team currently represents Marquette University during the 2026–27 NCAA Division I women's basketball season. The Golden Eagles, led by third-year head coach Cara Consuegra, play their home games at the Al McGuire Center (Note: Including one game at Fiserv Forum.) in Milwaukee, Wisconsin, and compete as a member of the Big East Conference.

== Previous season ==
The Golden Eagles finished the 2025–26 season 18–12 overall and 12–8 in Big East play, finishing fourth in the conference. As the No. 4 seed in the Big East tournament, they lost 44–57 to No. 5 Creighton in the quarterfinals to end their season.

== Offseason ==
=== Departures ===
Marquette departures
Name	Number	Pos.	Height	Year	Hometown	Reason for departure
Lee Volker	1	Guard	6'1"	Graduate Student	Purcellville, VA	Graduated
Jaidynn Mason	2	Guard	5'6"	Senior	Kansas City, MO	Graduated
Abbey Cracknell	4	Forward	5'11"	Graduate Student	Avoca Beach, Australia	Graduated
Charia Smith	5	Forward	6'1"	Junior	Columbus, OH	Transferred to Bradley
Bridget Utberg	7	Guard	5'5"	Senior	Canton, GA	Graduated
Skylar Forbes	11	Forward	6'3"	Junior	Markham, ON	Transferred to West Virginia
Jada Bediako	14	Forward	6'3"	Junior	Brampton, ON	Transferred to Texas
Kennedi Perkins	21	Guard	5'6"	Senior	Bolingbrook, IL	Graduated
Olivia Porter	23	Guard	5'8"	Senior	Chapel Hill, NC	Graduated, entered transfer portal
Ayuen Akot	24	Forward	5'11"	Senior	Melbourne, Australia	Graduated
Aryelle Stevens	35	Forward	6'1"	Senior	Pearland, TX	Graduated, transferred to Georgia State

=== Incoming transfers ===
Marquette incoming transfers
Name	Number	Pos.	Height	Year	Hometown	Previous school
Brooklyn Hall	1	Guard/Forward	6'1"	Sophomore	Dayton, OH	South Florida (Note: Joined South Florida mid-season in January, did not see action.)
Noelle Anthon	5	Forward	6'2"	Junior	Oconomowoc, WI	Hutchinson CC (NJCAA)
Yu Han Lin	11	Guard	5'9"	Sophomore	Hualien, Taiwan	Middle Tennessee
Mackenzie Givens	12	Guard/Forward	6'0"	Junior	Cincinnati, OH	Xavier
Kayl Petersen	34	Forward	6'1"	Junior	Waupun, WI	Virginia Tech

=== Recruiting class ===
There was no 2026 recruiting class.

== Preseason ==
On October 1, 2026, the Big East Conference released its annual preseason coaches poll and awards. Marquette was picked to finish sixth in the conference.

=== Preseason rankings ===
Big East Preseason Poll
Place	Team	Votes
1	UConn	100 (10)
2	Villanova	90 (1)
3	Creighton	78
4	St. John's	68
5	Seton Hall	67
6	Marquette	60
7	Providence	38
8	Georgetown	36
9	Xavier	29
10	Butler	21
11	DePaul	18
(#) first-place votes

=== Preseason All-Big East Team ===
Preseason All-Big East Team
Player	Year	Position
Halle Vice	Senior	Guard

=== Honorable Mentions ===
No players were named Big East preseason honorable mentions.

== Roster ==
Years are listed according to the new NCAA age-based eligibility model.

2026–27 Marquette Golden Eagles women's basketball team
Players
Coaches

Pos.	#	Name	Height	Year	Previous school	Hometown
G/F	1	Brooklyn Hall	6 ft 1 in (1.85 m)	So	Western Reserve Academy; South Florida	Dayton, OH
G	2	Kinley Asp	5 ft 11 in (1.8 m)	Fr	Air Academy High School	Colorado Springs, CO
G	3	Se'Crette Carter	5 ft 8 in (1.73 m)	Fr	Belleville High School	Rockwood, MI
F	5	Noelle Anthon	6 ft 2 in (1.88 m)	Fr	Oconomowoc High School; Hutchinson CC	Oconomowoc, WI
G	10	Kam Herring	6 ft 1 in (1.85 m)	So	Woodward Academy	Atlanta, GA
G	11	Yu Han Lin	5 ft 9 in (1.75 m)	So	Middle Tennessee	Hualien, Taiwan
G/F	12	Mackenzie Givens	6 ft 0 in (1.83 m)	Jr	Princeton High School; Xavier	Cincinnati, OH
C	16	Amina Traore	6 ft 2 in (1.88 m)	Sr	AS Monaco Basket	Paris, France
G	20	Jordan Meulemans	6 ft 0 in (1.83 m)	Jr	De Pere High School; Butler	De Pere, WI
G	22	Halle Vice	6 ft 1 in (1.85 m)	Sr	Pleasant Valley High School	Bettendorf, IA
G	24	JJ Barnes	5 ft 9 in (1.75 m)	So	The Prairie School	Racine, WI
F	34	Kayl Petersen	6 ft 1 in (1.85 m)	Jr	Waupun High School; Virginia Tech	Waupun, WI

Head coach

- Cara Consuegra (Iowa)

Assistant coach(es)

- Deont'a McChester (Keuka)
- Sheila Boykin (LSU)
- Joe Silvestri (Central Florida)
- Sam Logic (Iowa)
- Michael Garven (Marquette)

Legend

- (C) Team captain
- (S) Suspended
- (I) Ineligible
- (W) Walk-on
- Injured
- Current redshirt

Roster
Last update: September 20, 2026

== Schedule and results ==
Date time, TV	Rank^{#}	Opponent^{#}	Result	Record	High points	High rebounds	High assists	Site (attendance) city, state
Regular season
November 3, 2026*; 6:30 p.m., ESPN+		Mississippi Valley State	W 80–42	1–0	17 – Vice	16 – Vice	5 – Asp	Al McGuire Center (827); Milwaukee, WI
November 7, 2026*; 2:00 p.m., ESPN+		No. 17 Minnesota	L 79–87	1–1	25 – Vice	6 – Vice	5 – Tied	Al McGuire Center (1,450); Milwaukee, WI
November 10, 2026*; 11:00 a.m., ESPN+		Presbyterian	W 87–54	2–1	17 – Asp	8 – Traore	5 – Lin	Al McGuire Center (2,443); Milwaukee, WI
November 13, 2026*; 6:30 p.m., ESPN+		at Missouri State	W 70–58	3–1	23 – Givens	7 – Traore	3 – Lin	Great Southern Bank Arena (2,667); Springfield, MO
November 17, 2026*; 6:30 p.m., B1G+		at Wisconsin	L 48–73	3–2	15 – Asp	6 – Tied	2 – Tied	Kohl Center (2,643); Madison, WI
November 21, 2026*; 2:00 p.m., ESPN+		NJIT	W 77–50	4–2	16 – Hall	10 – Traore	4 – Tied	Al McGuire Center (1,026); Milwaukee, WI
November 23, 2026*; 6:00 p.m., ESPN+		at Milwaukee						Klotsche Center; Milwaukee, WI
November 27, 2026*; 10:00 a.m., BDG Live		vs. Illinois; Baha Mar Hoops Nassau Championship						Baha Mar Convention Center; Nassau, The Bahamas
November 29, 2026*; 3:00 p.m., BDG Live		vs. Belmont; Baha Mar Hoops Nassau Championship						Baha Mar Convention Center; Nassau, The Bahamas
December 4, 2026; 10:00 a.m., ESPN+		at Xavier						Cintas Center; Cincinnati, OH
December 6, 2026; 2:00 p.m., ESPN+		Butler						Al McGuire Center; Milwaukee, WI
December 10, 2026; 8:00 p.m., TruTV		Villanova						Al McGuire Center; Milwaukee, WI
December 13, 2026*; 2:00 p.m., ESPN+		Wagner						Al McGuire Center; Milwaukee, WI
December 20, 2026; 2:00 p.m., ESPN+		St. John's						Al McGuire Center; Milwaukee, WI
December 22, 2026*; 11:00 a.m., ESPN+		Alabama A&M						Al McGuire Center; Milwaukee, WI
December 31, 2026; 12:00 p.m., ESPN+		at Providence						Alumni Hall; Providence, RI
January 3, 2027; 2:00 p.m., ESPN+		Seton Hall						Al McGuire Center; Milwaukee, WI
January 10, 2027; 2:00 p.m., ESPN+		at DePaul						Wintrust Arena; Chicago, IL
January 13, 2027; 6:00 p.m., TruTV		at UConn						PeoplesBank Arena; Hartford, CT
January 17, 2027; 2:00 p.m., ESPN+		Georgetown						Al McGuire Center; Milwaukee, WI
January 20, 2027; 6:00 p.m., ESPN+		at Butler						Hinkle Fieldhouse; Indianapolis, IN
January 23, 2027; 12:00 p.m., ESPN+		at Seton Hall						Walsh Gymnasium; South Orange, NJ
January 28, 2027; 6:00 p.m., Peacock/NBCSN		Creighton						Al McGuire Center; Milwaukee, WI
January 31, 2027; 1:00 p.m., ESPN+		at St. John's						Carnesecca Arena; Queens, NY
February 3, 2027; 6:30 p.m., ESPN+		Xavier						Al McGuire Center; Milwaukee, WI
February 7, 2027; 1:30 p.m., TNT		UConn						Fiserv Forum; Milwaukee, WI
February 10, 2027; 6:00 p.m., ESPN+		at Georgetown						McDonough Arena; Washington, D.C.
February 18, 2027; 7:00 p.m., Peacock/NBCSN		at Villanova						Finneran Pavilion; Villanova, PA
February 21, 2027; 3:00 p.m., ESPN+		Providence						Al McGuire Center; Milwaukee, WI
February 24, 2027; 6:30 p.m., ESPN+		DePaul						Al McGuire Center; Milwaukee, WI
February 27, 2027; 11:30 a.m., FOX		at Creighton						D. J. Sokol Arena; Omaha, NE
Big East tournament
March 5–8, 2027; TBA		vs.						Mohegan Sun Arena; Uncasville, CT
*Non-conference game. ^{#}Rankings from AP Poll. (#) Tournament seedings in parentheses. All times are in Central.
