= 2026–27 UConn Huskies women's basketball team =

Intercollegiate basketball season

2026–27 UConn Huskies women's basketball
- Conference: Big East Conference

Ranking
- Coaches: No. 8
- AP: No. 7
- Record: 4–2 (1–0 Big East)
- Head coach: Geno Auriemma (42nd season)
- Associate head coach: Chris Dailey (42nd season)
- Assistant coaches: Morgan Valley (6th season); Tonya Cardoza (4th season); Nykesha Sales (1st season)
- Home arena: Harry A. Gampel Pavilion; PeoplesBank Arena

2026–27 Big East women's basketball standings
	Conf.				Overall
Team	W		L	PCT	W		L	PCT
No. 7 UConn	1	–	0	1.000	4	–	2	.667
Butler	0	–	0	–	6	–	0	1.000
Xavier	0	–	0	–	4	–	0	1.000
DePaul	0	–	0	–	5	–	1	.833
Creighton	0	–	0	–	4	–	1	.800
St. John's	0	–	0	–	4	–	1	.800
Georgetown	0	–	0	–	4	–	2	.667
Marquette	0	–	0	–	3	–	2	.600
Villanova	0	–	0	–	3	–	2	.600
Providence	0	–	0	–	2	–	3	.400
Seton Hall	0	–	1	.000	2	–	4	.333
† 2027 Big East tournament winner As of November 21, 2026; Rankings from AP poll

The 2026–27 UConn Huskies women's basketball team currently represents the University of Connecticut (UConn) during the 2026–27 NCAA Division I women's basketball season. The Huskies, led by Hall of Fame head coach Geno Auriemma in his 42nd season, split their home games between Harry A. Gampel Pavilion on their campus in Storrs, Connecticut, and the PeoplesBank Arena in Hartford, Connecticut and compete as a member of the Big East Conference.

== Previous season ==
The Huskies finished the 2025–26 season 38–1 overall and 20–0 in Big East play, to finish first and undefeated in the conference for the third consecutive season. Their 31–0 undefeated regular season marked the eleventh in program history, and the first since the 2015–16 season when they won their fourth consecutive national championship.

As the No. 1 seed in the Big East tournament, they received a bye to the quarterfinals, where they dominated the tournament by routing No. 8 Georgetown, No. 5 Creighton and No. 2 Villanova to win the Big East title for the sixth straight year since rejoining for the 2020–21 season, their twenty-fourth overall in the Big East, and their thirtieth of all time.

In the NCAA tournament, the Huskies were seeded first in Fort Worth Regional #1, as well as the first overall seed in the tournament. They dominated No. 16 UTSA and No. 8 Syracuse in the first and second rounds. They then advanced to the Sweet Sixteen for their thirty-second consecutive season, the most in NCAA history, where they routed No. 4 North Carolina 63–42. Following the victory, they advanced to the Elite Eight, where they defeated No. 6 Notre Dame for the second time of the season, winning the regional title. Finally, they were eliminated in the Final Four to No. 1 in the Sacramento Regional and No. 4 nationally ranked South Carolina, 48–62.

Going back to the 2024–25 season, the Huskies won 54 straight games up until their Final Four loss to South Carolina, their fourth longest in program history.

== Offseason ==
=== Departures ===
UConn departures
Name	Num	Pos.	Height	Year	Hometown	Reason for departure
Serah Williams	22	Forward	6'4"	Senior	Brooklyn, NY	Graduated; selected 33rd overall by the Connecticut Sun in the 2026 WNBA draft
Ice Brady	25	Forward	6'3"	(redshirt) Junior	San Diego, CA	Transferred to Florida State
Caroline Ducharme	33	Guard	6'2"	(redshirt) Senior	Milton, MA	Graduated; went undrafted in the 2026 WNBA draft, signed a training camp contract with the Golden State Valkyries
Ayanna Patterson	34	Forward	6'2"	(redshirt) Sophomore	Fort Wayne, IN	Transferred to Kentucky
Azzi Fudd	35	Guard	5'11"	Graduate student	Arlington, VA	Graduated; selected 1st overall by the Dallas Wings in the 2026 WNBA draft

=== Incoming transfers ===
There were no incoming transfers for the 2026–27 season.

=== Recruiting class ===
College recruiting
Name	Hometown	School	Height	Weight	Commit date
Olivia Vukosa; F	Whitestone, New York	Christ the King	6 ft 4 in (1.93 m)	N/A	
Olivia Vukosa; F	Recruit ratings: Rivals: 247Sports: ESPN: (98)				
Overall recruit ranking: ESPN: 9
Note: In many cases, Scout, Rivals, 247Sports, On3, and ESPN may conflict in their listings of height and weight.; In these cases, the average was taken. ESPN grades are on a 100-point scale.; Sources: "2026 Player Commits". ESPN. Archived from the original on July 20, 2026.

== Preseason ==
On October 1, 2026, the Big East Conference released its annual preseason coaches poll and awards. UConn was picked to finish first in the conference for the seventh consecutive season since rejoining the conference in 2020.

=== Preseason rankings ===
Big East Preseason Poll
Place	Team	Votes
1	UConn	100 (10)
2	Villanova	90 (1)
3	Creighton	78
4	St. John's	68
5	Seton Hall	67
6	Marquette	60
7	Providence	38
8	Georgetown	36
9	Xavier	29
10	Butler	21
11	DePaul	18
(#) first-place votes

=== Preseason All-Big East Team ===
Preseason All-Big East Team
Player	Year	Position
KK Arnold	Senior	Guard
Blanca Quiñónez	Sophomore	Forward

=== Honorable Mentions ===
Honorable Mentions
Player	Year	Position
Ashlynn Shade	Senior	Guard

=== Other awards ===
Other awards
Player	Year	Position	Award
Sarah Strong	Junior	Forward	Preseason Player of the Year
Olivia Vukosa	Freshman	Center	Preseason Freshman of the Year

== Roster ==
2026–27 UConn Huskies women's basketball team
Players
Coaches

Pos.	#	Name	Height	Year	Previous school	Hometown
G	2	KK Arnold	5 ft 9 in (1.75 m)	Sr	Germantown High School	Germantown, WI
F	4	Blanca Quiñónez	6 ft 1 in (1.85 m)	So	Mario Pagano Boarding School	Milagro, Ecuador
G	5	Marine Dursus	5 ft 10 in (1.78 m)	Fr	Collège Hector Berlioz	Strasbourg, France
G	7	Kelis Fisher	5 ft 9 in (1.75 m)	So	IMG Academy	Baltimore, MD
C	8	Jana El-Alfy	6 ft 5 in (1.96 m)	RS Jr	Al Ahly SC	Cairo, Egypt
G	9	Kayleigh Heckel	5 ft 9 in (1.75 m)	Jr	Long Island Lutheran High School; USC	Port Chester, NY
G	11	Allie Ziebell	6 ft 0 in (1.83 m)	Jr	Neenah High School	Neenah, WI
G	12	Ashlynn Shade	5 ft 10 in (1.78 m)	Sr	La Lumiere School	Noblesville, IN
G	13	Jovana Popovic	5 ft 9 in (1.75 m)	Fr	Gimnazija Žarko Zrenjanin	Vrbas, Serbia
F	21	Sarah Strong	6 ft 2 in (1.88 m)	Jr	Grace Christian School	Fuquay-Varina, NC
G	23	Morgan Cheli	6 ft 2 in (1.88 m)	RS So	Archbishop Mitty High School	San Jose, CA
C	25	Olivia Vukosa	6 ft 5 in (1.96 m)	Fr	Christ the King Regional High School	Whitestone, NY
C	42	Gandy Malou-Mamel	6 ft 5 in (1.96 m)	So	Gill St. Bernard's School	Limerick, Ireland

Head coach

- Geno Auriemma (West Chester)

Assistant coach(es)

- Chris Dailey (Rutgers)
- Morgan Valley (Connecticut)
- Tonya Cardoza (Virginia)
- Nykesha Sales (Connecticut)

Legend

- (C) Team captain
- (S) Suspended
- (I) Ineligible
- (W) Walk-on
- Injured
- Current redshirt

Roster
Last update: July 20, 2026

== Schedule and results ==
Date time, TV	Rank^{#}	Opponent^{#}	Result	Record	High points	High rebounds	High assists	Site (attendance) city, state
Exhibition
October 12, 2026*; 6:30 p.m., NBCSB		vs. Syracuse; Hall of Fame Series Exhibition	W 88–60		15 – Strong	9 – Vukosa	6 – Arnold	Mohegan Sun Arena (5,012); Uncasville, CT
October 19, 2026*; 7:00 p.m., WFSB/WWAX		Texas	W 83–61		27 – Strong	7 – Popovic	5 – Popovic	PeoplesBank Arena (10,367); Hartford, CT
October 25, 2026*; 4:00 p.m., WWAX	No. 2	Army	W 86–50		19 – Strong	7 – Tied	4 – Tied	Harry A. Gampel Pavilion (10,244); Storrs, CT
Regular season
November 2, 2026*; 5:00 p.m., Peacock/NBCSN	No. 2	Cornell	W 100–35	1–0	19 – Tied	8 – Vukosa	5 – Strong	PeoplesBank Arena (10,409); Hartford, CT
November 5, 2026*; 6:30 p.m., FS1	No. 2	at No. 5 Michigan	L 66–77	1–1	25 – Popovic	8 – Strong	4 – Tied	Crisler Center (9,575); Ann Arbor, MI
November 8, 2026*; 2:00 p.m., FS1	No. 2	No. 10 Iowa	W 91–79	2–1	39 – Strong	10 – Tied	6 – Popovic	Harry A. Gampel Pavilion (10,244); Storrs, CT
November 12, 2026*; 6:30 p.m., FS1	No. 4	at No. 17 Ohio State	W 87–55	3–1	25 – Strong	12 – Vukosa	6 – Vukosa	Schottenstein Center (8,842); Columbus, OH
November 15, 2026*; 5:30 p.m., ESPN	No. 4	at No. 7 Louisville	L 51–69	3–2	19 – Strong	6 – Shade	5 – Arnold	KFC Yum! Center (12,692); Louisville, KY
November 20, 2026; 8:00 p.m., Peacock/NBCSN	No. 7	Seton Hall	W 83–43	4–2 (1–0)	20 – Popovic	7 – Strong	9 – Arnold	PeoplesBank Arena (10,267); Hartford, CT
November 24, 2026*; 8:00 p.m., FS1		vs. South Carolina; Hall of Fame Basketball Women's Showcase						Mohegan Sun Arena; Uncasville, CT
November 28, 2026*; 7:00 p.m., FOX		vs. Duke; Bad Boy Mower Series – Boston						TD Garden; Boston, MA
December 2, 2026*; 6:30 p.m., FS1		UNLV						Harry A. Gampel Pavilion; Storrs, CT
December 5, 2026*; 4:30 p.m., FOX		vs. Maryland; Women's Champions Classic						Barclays Center; Brooklyn, NY
December 9, 2026*; 7:00 p.m., ESPN		at Notre Dame; Rivalry						Purcell Pavilion; South Bend, IN
December 12, 2026*; 2:30 p.m., FOX		Tennessee						PeoplesBank Arena; Hartford, CT
December 16, 2026; 7:00 p.m., Peacock/NBCSN		Creighton						Harry A. Gampel Pavilion; Storrs, CT
December 20, 2026*; 1:00 p.m., ABC		vs. LSU; Sprouts Farmers Market espnW Invitational						Bridgestone Arena; Nashville, TN
December 23, 2026; 1:00 p.m., Peacock/NBCSN		at Villanova						Finneran Pavilion; Villanova, PA
December 31, 2026; 5:00 p.m., FS1		at Xavier						Cintas Center; Cincinnati, OH
January 3, 2027; 4:00 p.m., NBC		at DePaul						Wintrust Arena; Chicago, IL
January 7, 2027; 7:00 p.m., TNT		Georgetown						PeoplesBank Arena; Hartford, CT
January 10, 2027; 2:00 p.m., Peacock/NBCSN		at Creighton						Liberty First Credit Union Arena; Ralston, NE
January 13, 2027; 7:00 p.m., TruTV		Marquette						PeoplesBank Arena; Hartford, CT
January 18, 2027; 2:30 p.m., FOX		at Seton Hall; Coretta Scott King Classic						Prudential Center; Newark, NJ
January 24, 2027; 12:00 p.m., TNT		at St. John's						Madison Square Garden; New York, NY
January 28, 2027; 6:30 p.m., FS1		DePaul						Harry A. Gampel Pavilion; Storrs, CT
January 31, 2027; 12:00 p.m., TNT		Providence						PeoplesBank Arena; Hartford, CT
February 4, 2027; 7:00 p.m., TruTV		at Butler						Hinkle Fieldhouse; Indianapolis, IN
February 7, 2027; 2:30 p.m., TNT		at Marquette						Fiserv Forum; Milwaukee, WI
February 10, 2027; 6:00 p.m., Peacock/NBCSN		Villanova						Harry A. Gampel Pavilion; Storrs, CT
February 13, 2027; 12:00 p.m., FS1		Xavier						Harry A. Gampel Pavilion; Storrs, CT
February 18, 2027; 7:00 p.m., Peacock/NBCSN		at Georgetown						Capital One Arena; Washington, D.C.
February 21, 2027; 12:00 p.m., FS1		St. John's						PeoplesBank Arena; Hartford, CT
February 25, 2027; 7:00 p.m., TNT		at Providence						Amica Mutual Pavilion; Providence, RI
February 28, 2027; 2:00 p.m., FS1		Butler						Harry A. Gampel Pavilion; Storrs, CT
Big East tournament
March 5–8, 2027; TBA		vs.						Mohegan Sun Arena; Uncasville, CT
*Non-conference game. ^{#}Rankings from AP Poll. (#) Tournament seedings in parentheses. All times are in Eastern.

== Rankings ==
Ranking movements Legend: ██ Increase in ranking ██ Decrease in ranking ( ) = First-place votes
	Week																				
Poll	Pre	1	2	3	4	5	6	7	8	9	10	11	12	13	14	15	16	17	18	19	Final
AP	2 (6)	4	7																		
Coaches	2 (6)	4	8																		
