= 2026–27 Creighton Bluejays women's basketball team =

American college basketball season

2026–27 Creighton Bluejays women's basketball
- Conference: Big East
- Record: 4–2 (0–0 Big East)
- Head coach: Jim Flanery (25th season)
- Assistant coaches: Carli Berger; Mike Jewett; Alexis Akin-Otiko; Jessica January
- Home arena: D. J. Sokol Arena

2026–27 Big East women's basketball standings
	Conf.				Overall
Team	W		L	PCT	W		L	PCT
No. 7 UConn	1	–	0	1.000	4	–	2	.667
Butler	0	–	0	–	6	–	0	1.000
DePaul	0	–	0	–	6	–	1	.857
Creighton	0	–	0	–	4	–	1	.800
St. John's	0	–	0	–	4	–	1	.800
Xavier	0	–	0	–	4	–	1	.800
Georgetown	0	–	0	–	4	–	2	.667
Marquette	0	–	0	–	4	–	2	.667
Villanova	0	–	0	–	3	–	2	.600
Providence	0	–	0	–	2	–	4	.333
Seton Hall	0	–	1	.000	2	–	4	.333
† 2027 Big East tournament winner As of November 22, 2026; Rankings from AP poll

The 2026–27 Creighton Bluejays women's basketball team currently represents Creighton University during the 2026–27 NCAA Division I women's basketball season. The Bluejays, led by 25th-year head coach Jim Flanery, play their home games at the D. J. Sokol Arena in Omaha, Nebraska, and compete as a member of the Big East Conference.

== Previous season ==
The Bluejays finished the 2025–26 season 16–15 overall and 5–13 in Big Ten play, to finish in a tie for fifth in the conference with St. John's. As the No. 5 seed in the Big East tournament, they defeated No. 4 Marquette 57–44 in the quarterfinals before falling in the semifinals to top-seeded and undefeated UConn 51–100 to end their season.

== Offseason ==
=== Departures ===
Creighton departures
Name	Num	Pos.	Height	Year	Hometown	Reason for departure
Kennedy Townsend	2	Guard	5'10"	Senior	Kansas City, MO	Graduated
Kiani Lockett	11	Guard	5'8"	Senior	Minneapolis, MN	Graduated
Elizabeth Gentry	35	Center	6'3"	Sophomore	Littleton, CO	Transferred to Utah Valley
Grace Boffeli	42	Forward	6'1"	Graduate Student	Eldridge, IA	Graduated

=== Incoming transfers ===
Creighton incoming transfers
Name	Num	Pos.	Height	Year	Hometown	Previous School
Nia Holloway	41	Forward	6'0"	(redshirt) Senior	Eden Prairie, MN	Minnesota

=== Recruiting ===
There was no 2026 recruiting class.

== Preseason ==
On October 1, 2026, the Big East Conference released its annual preseason coaches poll and awards. Creighton was picked to finish third in the conference.

=== Preseason rankings ===
Big East Preseason Poll
Place	Team	Votes
1	UConn	100 (10)
2	Villanova	90 (1)
3	Creighton	78
4	St. John's	68
5	Seton Hall	67
6	Marquette	60
7	Providence	38
8	Georgetown	36
9	Xavier	29
10	Butler	21
11	DePaul	18
(#) first-place votes

=== Preseason All-Big East Team ===
Preseason All-Big East Team
Player	Year	Position
Neleigh Gessert	Sophomore	Guard
Ava Zediker	Sophomore	Guard

=== Honorable Mentions ===
No players were named Big East preseason honorable mentions.

== Roster ==
Years are listed according to the new NCAA age-based eligibility model.

2026–27 Creighton Bluejays women's basketball team
Players
Coaches

Pos.	#	Name	Height	Year	Previous school	Hometown
G	1	Kendall McGee	5 ft 10 in (1.78 m)	So	Benilde-St. Margaret's	Brooklyn Park, MN
G	2	Jayla Williams	5 ft 10 in (1.78 m)	Fr	Ankeny High School	Ankney, IA
G	3	Mya Moore	6 ft 0 in (1.83 m)	Fr	Orono High School	Independence, MN
G/F	5	Kate Amelotte	6 ft 1 in (1.85 m)	Fr	Wayzata High School	Plymouth, MN
F	9	Tara Dacic	6 ft 2 in (1.88 m)	So	Archbishop Riordan High School	Belgrade, Serbia
G	13	Allison Heathcock	6 ft 1 in (1.85 m)	Jr	Edmond North High School	Edmond, OK
F	22	Avery Cooper	6 ft 1 in (1.85 m)	So	Lake Zurich High School	Lake Zurich, IL
G	23	Neleigh Gessert	6 ft 0 in (1.83 m)	So	Millard West High School	Omaha, NE
G	24	Ava Zediker	5 ft 10 in (1.78 m)	Jr	Dowling Catholic High School	Des Moines, IA
G	30	Norah Gessert	6 ft 0 in (1.83 m)	So	Millard West High School	Omaha, NE
F	41	Nia Holloway	6 ft 0 in (1.83 m)	GS	Eden Prairie High School; Minnesota	Eden Prairie, MN

Head coach

- Jim Flanery (Creighton)

Assistant coach(es)

- Carli Berger (Creighton)
- Mike Jewett (South Dakota)
- Alexis Akin-Otiko (Creighton)
- Jessica January (DePaul)

Legend

- (C) Team captain
- (S) Suspended
- (I) Ineligible
- (W) Walk-on
- Injured
- Current redshirt

Roster
Last update: September 19, 2026

== Schedule and results ==
Date time, TV	Rank^{#}	Opponent^{#}	Result	Record	High points	High rebounds	High assists	Site (attendance) city, state
Exhibition
October 19, 2026*; 6:00 p.m.		Truman State	W 72–61		–	–	–	D. J. Sokol Arena; Omaha, NE
Non-conference regular season
November 2, 2026*; 7:00 p.m., Midco Sports Plus		at South Dakota State	W 73–71	1–0	21 – Zediker	11 – Heathcock	3 – Moore	First Bank and Trust Arena (2,453); Brookings, SD
November 9, 2026*; 7:00 p.m., SLN		at North Dakota State	W 66–60	2–0	25 – Zediker	10 – Holloway	2 – Tied	Scheels Center (941); Fargo, ND
November 11, 2026*; 6:00 p.m., SLN		vs. South Dakota	L 49–54	2–1	12 – Ne. Gessert	4 – Heathcock	3 – Williams	Sanford Pentagon (763); Sioux Falls, SD
November 15, 2026*; 2:00 p.m., ESPN+		at Northern Iowa	W 72–50	3–1	18 – Moore	9 – Zediker	2 – Heathcock	McLeod Center (2,038); Cedar Falls, IA
November 18, 2026*; 6:30 p.m., ESPN+		Omaha	W 74–53	4–1	19 – Zediker	6 – Tied	3 – Tied	D. J. Sokol Arena (1,187); Omaha, NE
November 22, 2026*; 2:00 p.m., FS1		No. 23 Nebraska	L 45–55	4–2	12 – Moore	5 – Williams	2 – Heathcock	Liberty First Credit Union Arena (2,394); Ralston, NE
November 27, 2026*; 3:30 p.m., BDG Live		vs. Houston; Coconut Hoops Great Egert Division semifnals						Alico Arena; Fort Myers, FL
November 29, 2026*; 3:00 p.m./5:30 p.m., BDG Live		vs. Tennessee/Florida Gulf Coast; Coconut Hoops Great Egert Division						Alico Arena; Fort Myers, FL
December 5, 2026*; 3:30 p.m., ESPN+		Drake						D. J. Sokol Arena; Omaha, NE
December 12, 2026*; 5:00 p.m.		vs. Kansas State; Bill Snyder Classic						St. Joseph Civic Arena; St. Joseph, MO
Big East regular season
December 16, 2026; 6:00 p.m., Peacock/NBCSN		at UConn						Harry A. Gampel Pavilion; Storrs, CT
December 20, 2026; 2:00 p.m., ESPN+		at DePaul						Wintrust Arena; Chicago, IL
December 22, 2026; 5:00 p.m., ESPN+		Butler						D. J. Sokol Arena; Omaha, NE
December 30, 2026; 12:00 p.m., ESPN+		at Seton Hall						Walsh Gymnasium; South Orange, NJ
January 2, 2027; 1:00 p.m., ESPN+		at Georgetown						McDonough Gymnasium; Washington, D.C.
January 7, 2027; 7:00 p.m., Peacock/NBCSN		Villanova						D. J. Sokol Arena; Omaha, NE
January 10, 2027; 1:00 p.m., Peacock/NBCSN		UConn						Liberty First Credit Union Arena; Ralston, NE
January 14, 2027; 6:30 p.m., ESPN+		St. John's						D. J. Sokol Arena; Omaha, NE
January 17, 2027; 12:00 p.m., ESPN+		at Providence						Alumni Hall; Providence, RI
January 20, 2027; 6:30 p.m., ESPN+		Xavier						D. J. Sokol Arena; Omaha, NE
January 24, 2027; 12:00 p.m., ESPN+		at Butler						Hinkle Fieldhouse; Indianapolis, IN
January 28, 2027; 6:00 p.m., Peacock/NBCSN		at Marquette						Al McGuire Center; Milwaukee, WI
January 31, 2027; 1:00 p.m., ESPN+		Seton Hall						D. J. Sokol Arena; Omaha, NE
February 6, 2027; 1:00 p.m, ESPN+		Georgetown						D. J. Sokol Arena; Omaha, NE
February 10, 2027; 6:30 p.m., ESPN+		DePaul						D. J. Sokol Arena; Omaha, NE
February 14, 2027; 10:00 a.m., TruTV		at St. John's						Carnesecca Arena; Queens, NY
February 18, 2027; 6:30 p.m., ESPN+		Providence						D. J. Sokol Arena; Omaha, NE
February 21, 2027; 1:00 p.m., TruTV		at Villanova						Finneran Pavilion; Villanova, PA
February 24, 2027; 5:30 p.m., ESPN+		at Xavier						Cintas Center; Cincinnati, OH
February 27, 2027; 11:30 a.m., FOX		Marquette						D. J. Sokol Arena; Omaha, NE
Big East tournament
March 5–8, 2027; TBA		vs.						Mohegan Sun Arena; Uncasville, CT
*Non-conference game. ^{#}Rankings from AP Poll. (#) Tournament seedings in parentheses. All times are in Central.

== Rankings ==
Ranking movements Legend: — = Not ranked
	Week																				
Poll	Pre	1	2	3	4	5	6	7	8	9	10	11	12	13	14	15	16	17	18	19	Final
AP	—																				
Coaches	—																				
