= 2026–27 Xavier Musketeers women's basketball team =

American college basketball season

2026–27 Xavier Musketeers women's basketball
- Conference: Big East Conference
- Record: 4–1 (0–0 Big East)
- Head coach: Billi Chambers (4th season)
- Associate head coach: Ashlee Kelly
- Assistant coaches: Brianna Sanders; Ari Wideman
- Home arena: Cintas Center

2026–27 Big East women's basketball standings
	Conf.				Overall
Team	W		L	PCT	W		L	PCT
No. 7 UConn	1	–	0	1.000	4	–	2	.667
Butler	0	–	0	–	6	–	0	1.000
DePaul	0	–	0	–	6	–	1	.857
Creighton	0	–	0	–	4	–	1	.800
St. John's	0	–	0	–	4	–	1	.800
Xavier	0	–	0	–	4	–	1	.800
Georgetown	0	–	0	–	4	–	2	.667
Marquette	0	–	0	–	4	–	2	.667
Villanova	0	–	0	–	3	–	2	.600
Providence	0	–	0	–	2	–	4	.333
Seton Hall	0	–	1	.000	2	–	4	.333
† 2027 Big East tournament winner As of November 22, 2026; Rankings from AP poll

The 2026–27 Xavier Musketeers women's basketball team currently represents Xavier University during the 2026–27 NCAA Division I women's basketball season. The Musketeers, led by fourth-year head coach Billi Chambers, play their home games at the Cintas Center in Cincinnati, Ohio, and compete as a member of the Big East Conference.

== Previous season ==
The Musketeers finished the 2025–26 season 11–19 overall and 4–16 in Big East play, finishing last in the conference for the fourth straight season. As the No. 11 seed in the Big East tournament, they lost 48–53 to No. 6 St. John's to end their season.

== Offseason ==
=== Departures ===
Xavier departures
Name	Num.	Pos.	Height	Year	Hometown	Reason for departure
Savannah White	2	Guard/Forward	6'2"	Senior	St. Paul, MN	Graduated, transferred to Penn State (Note: As part of an ongoing lawsuit challenging the new NCAA age-based eligibility model which excluded the class of 2022, White was granted an additional year of eligibility from a temporary restraining order filed in Ohio.)
Vivien Nejašmić	7	Guard	6'0"	Sophomore	Split, Croatia	Transferred to La Salle
Phoebe Holmes	11	Guard	5'7"	Sophomore	Mackay, Australia	Transferred to North Alabama
Mackenzie Givens	12	Guard/Forward	6'0"	Sophomore	Cincinnati, OH	Transferred to Marquette
Mariyah Noel	13	Guard	5'11"	Junior	Kansas City, KS	Transferred to Kansas
Petra Oborilova	15	Forward	6'2"	Senior	Banská Bystrica, Slovakia	Graduated
Audia Young	21	Guard	5'9"	(redshirt) Junior	Tallahassee, FL	Transferred to Charlotte
Penda Dieng	22	Forward	6'3"	Freshman	Louga, Senegal	Transferred to Georgia Tech
Lucía Martínez López	24	Guard/Forward	6'1"	Sophomore	Oviedo, Spain	Transferred to Miami (OH)

=== Incoming transfers ===
Xavier incoming transfers
Name	Num.	Pos.	Height	Year	Hometown	Previous school
Maria Anais Rodriguez	3	Forward	6'1"	Junior	Barcelona, Spain	Arkansas
Hila Karsh	24	Guard	5'8"	Sophomore	Rishon LeZion, Israel	Purdue
Diawna Carter-Hartley	25	Forward	6'1"	Senior	Cincinnati, OH	South Alabama

=== Recruiting class ===
There was no 2026 recruiting class.

== Preseason ==
On October 1, 2026, the Big East Conference released its annual preseason coaches poll and awards. Xavier was picked to finish ninth in the conference.

=== Preseason rankings ===
Big East Preseason Poll
Place	Team	Votes
1	UConn	100 (10)
2	Villanova	90 (1)
3	Creighton	78
4	St. John's	68
5	Seton Hall	67
6	Marquette	60
7	Providence	38
8	Georgetown	36
9	Xavier	29
10	Butler	21
11	DePaul	18
(#) first-place votes

=== Preseason All-Big East Team ===
No players were selected for the Preseason All-Big East Team.

=== Honorable Mentions ===
Honorable Mentions
Player	Year	Position
Meri Kanerva	Junior	Guard

== Roster ==
Years are listed according to the new NCAA age-based eligibility model.

2026–27 Xavier Musketeers women's basketball team
Players
Coaches

Pos.	#	Name	Height	Year	Previous school	Hometown
G	1	Payton Richards	5 ft 4 in (1.63 m)	So	Lake Travis High School	Austin, TX
G	2	Lucile Jerome	5 ft 9 in (1.75 m)	Sr	Flammes Carolo Basket	Amiens, France
F	3	Maria Anais Rodriguez	6 ft 1 in (1.85 m)	Jr	Segle XXI; Arkansas	Barcelona, Spain
G/F	5	Kodee Williams-Sefo	6 ft 1 in (1.85 m)	So	Westlake Girls High School	Auckland, New Zealand
G	6	Stella Mavuanga	5 ft 6 in (1.68 m)	Sr	Saint-Amand Hainaut Basket	Chelles, France
G	7	Kejia Ran	6 ft 0 in (1.83 m)	Fr		Dazhou, China
G	8	Meri Kanerva	5 ft 9 in (1.75 m)	Jr	Mäkelänrinne Upper Secondary School	Espoo, Finland
G/F	9	Maria Moscarella	6 ft 2 in (1.88 m)	Fr	Limonta Sport Costa Masnaga	Santa Marta, Colombia
G/F	10	Denise Neves	6 ft 1 in (1.85 m)	So		Lisbon, Portugal
G/F	15	Morgan Jenkins	6 ft 2 in (1.88 m)	Fr	The Newman School	Higganum, CT
G	24	Hila Karsh	5 ft 8 in (1.73 m)	Sr	Purdue	Rishon LeZion, Israel
F	25	Diawna Carter-Harley	6 ft 1 in (1.85 m)	Sr	Princeton High School; South Alabama	Cincinnati, OH
G	44	Mya Moore (5th)	6 ft 2 in (1.88 m)	Sr	Pius XI High School; Cleveland State	Milwaukee, WI

Head coach

- Billi Chambers (Hofstra)

Assistant coach(es)

- Ashlee Kelly (Quinnipiac)
- Brianna Sanders (Ohio State)
- Ari Wideman (Nevada)

Legend

- (C) Team captain
- (S) Suspended
- (I) Ineligible
- (W) Walk-on
- (5th) Fifth year senior
- Injured
- Current redshirt

Roster
Last update: September 23, 2026

== Schedule and results ==
Date time, TV	Rank^{#}	Opponent^{#}	Result	Record	High points	High rebounds	High assists	Site (attendance) city, state
Exhibition
October 25, 2026*; 12:00 p.m.		Mercyhurst	W 85–64		–	–	–	Cintas Center; Cincinnati, OH
Regular season
November 2, 2026*; 7:00 p.m., ESPN+		at Purdue Fort Wayne	W 75–63	1–0	28 – Jerome	10 – Carter-Hartley	5 – Kanerva	Gates Sports Center (604); Fort Wayne, IN
November 5, 2026*; 8:00 p.m., B1G+		at Northwestern	W 91–78	2–0	22 – Tied	7 – Ran	8 – Kanerva	Welsh–Ryan Arena (826); Evanston, IL
November 9, 2026*; 6:30 p.m., ESPN+		Akron	W 70–54	3–0	17 – Ran	9 – Moscarella	5 – Jerome	Cintas Center (1,137); Cincinnati, OH
November 16, 2026*; 6:30 p.m., ESPN+		Cleveland State	W 68–41	4–0	12 – Ran	10 – Ran	6 – Jerome	Cintas Center (966); Cincinnati, OH
November 21, 2026*; 1:00 p.m., ESPN+		at Ohio	L 62–71	4–1	13 – Anais Rodriguez	8 – Moscarilla	5 – Jerome	Convocation Center (300); Athens, OH
November 23, 2026*; 7:00 p.m., ESPN+		at Dayton						UD Arena; Dayton, OH
November 26, 2026*; 9:00 p.m., ESPN+		vs. Santa Clara; Paradise Jam Island Division semifinals						UVI Sports and Fitness Center; Charlotte Amalie, USVI
November 28, 2026*; 1:30/4:00 p.m., ESPN+		vs. Air Force or Texas Tech; Paradise Jam Island Division						UVI Sports and Fitness Center; Charlotte Amalie, USVI
December 4, 2026; 11:00 a.m., ESPN+		Marquette						Cintas Center; Cincinnati, OH
December 6, 2026; 1:00 p.m., ESPN+		St. John's						Cintas Center; Cincinnati, OH
December 10, 2026*; 6:30 p.m., ESPN+		IU Southeast						Cintas Center; Cincinnati, OH
December 15, 2026*; 6:30 p.m., ESPN+		Cincinnati; Crosstown Shootout						Cintas Center; Cincinnati, OH
December 20, 2026; 2:00 p.m., ESPN+		at Georgetown						McDonough Arena; Washington, D.C.
December 23, 2026; 12:00 p.m., ESPN+		at Seton Hall						Walsh Gymnasium; South Orange, NJ
December 31, 2026; 5:00 p.m., FS1		UConn						Cintas Center; Cincinnati, OH
January 3, 2027; 1:00 p.m., ESPN+		Providence						Cintas Center; Cincinnati, OH
January 7, 2027; 7:00 p.m., ESPN+		at St. John's						Carnesecca Arena; Queens, NY
January 10, 2027; 2:00 p.m., ESPN+		at Villanova						Finneran Pavilion; Villanova, PA
January 13, 2027; 6:30 p.m., ESPN+		DePaul						Cintas Center; Cincinnati, OH
January 16, 2027; 2:00 p.m., ESPN+		at Butler						Hinkle Fieldhouse; Indianapolis, IN
January 20, 2027; 7:30 p.m., ESPN+		at Creighton						D. J. Sokol Arena; Omaha, NE
January 27, 2027; 6:30 p.m., ESPN+		Seton Hall						Cintas Center; Cincinnati, OH
January 31, 2027; 1:00 p.m., ESPN+		Villanova						Cintas Center; Cincinnati, OH
February 3, 2027; 7:30 p.m., ESPN+		at Marquette						Al McGuire Center; Milwaukee, WI
February 6, 2027; 1:00 p.m., ESPN+		at Providence						Alumni Hall; Providence, RI
February 10, 2027; 6:30 p.m., ESPN+		Butler						Cintas Center; Cincinnati, OH
February 13, 2027; 12:00 p.m., FS1		at UConn						Harry A. Gampel Pavilion; Storrs, CT
February 21, 2027; 1:00 p.m., ESPN+		Georgetown						Cintas Center; Cincinnati, OH
February 24, 2027; 6:30 p.m., ESPN+		Creighton						Cintas Center; Cincinnati, OH
February 28, 2027; 3:00 p.m., ESPN+		at DePaul						Wintrust Arena; Chicago, IL
Big East tournament
March 5–8, 2027; TBA		vs.						Mohegan Sun Arena; Uncasville, CT
*Non-conference game. ^{#}Rankings from AP Poll. (#) Tournament seedings in parentheses. All times are in Eastern.
