= Alex G. Spanos Center =

Indoor stadium

- Interactive map of Alex G. Spanos Center
- Full name: Alex G. Spanos Center
- Location: 1178 Larry Heller Drive; Stockton, CA 95211
- Coordinates: 37.976669°N 121.315095°W
- Owner: University of the Pacific
- Operator: University of the Pacific
- Capacity: 6,150
- Surface: Hardwood

Construction
- Groundbreaking: August 1979
- Opened: September 9, 1981
- Cost: $7 million ($24.8 million in 2025 dollars)

Tenants
- Pacific Tigers men's basketball Pacific Tigers women's basketball Pacific Tigers women's volleyball

Alex G. Spanos Center is a 6,150-seat, indoor multi-purpose stadium on the campus of the University of the Pacific in Stockton, California.

The Alex G. Spanos Center opened on September 9, 1981, and was constructed for over $7 million. It is named after late Pacific alumnus and San Diego / Los Angeles Chargers owner Alex Spanos. The arena consists of 3,000 chair-back seats with the rest of the capacity coming from bleacher style seating. If needed, the arena can expand its capacity to 8,000 for certain events. The arena was the premiere sports and entertainment venue in the Stockton area until the completion of Adventist Health Arena in 2005.

== Tenants ==
Alex G. Spanos Center is currently the home for several University of the Pacific's sports programs, including the Pacific Tigers men's basketball, Pacific Tigers women's basketball and Pacific Tigers women's volleyball.

On October 15, 2008, Pacific hosted a pre-season NBA exhibition between the Los Angeles Clippers and the Sacramento Kings.

== See also ==
- List of NCAA Division I basketball arenas
