= 2026–27 Butler Bulldogs women's basketball team =

American college basketball season

2026–27 Butler Bulldogs women's basketball
- Conference: Big East Conference
- Record: 6–0 (0–0 Big East)
- Head coach: Maria Marchesano (1st season)
- Assistant coaches: Steven Asher; Latrell Fleming; Karen Stack; Quincy Cunningham; Chelsey Perry
- Home arena: Hinkle Fieldhouse

2026–27 Big East women's basketball standings
	Conf.				Overall
Team	W		L	PCT	W		L	PCT
Butler	0	–	0	–	6	–	0	1.000
Xavier	0	–	0	–	4	–	0	1.000
DePaul	0	–	0	–	5	–	1	.833
Creighton	0	–	0	–	4	–	1	.800
St. John's	0	–	0	–	4	–	1	.800
Georgetown	0	–	0	–	4	–	2	.667
Marquette	0	–	0	–	3	–	2	.600
No. 7 UConn	0	–	0	–	3	–	2	.600
Villanova	0	–	0	–	3	–	2	.600
Providence	0	–	0	–	2	–	3	.400
Seton Hall	0	–	0	–	2	–	3	.400
† 2027 Big East tournament winner As of November 21, 2026; Rankings from AP poll

The 2026–27 Butler Bulldogs women's basketball team currently represents Butler University during the 2026–27 NCAA Division I women's basketball season. The Bulldogs, led by first-year head coach Maria Marchesano, play their home games at Hinkle Fieldhouse in Indianapolis, Indiana and compete as a member of the Big East Conference.

== Previous season ==
The Bulldogs finished the 2025–26 season 12–19 overall and 6–14 in Big East play, finishing eighth in the conference. As the No. 8 seed in the Big East tournament, they lost 58–62 in the first round to No. 9 Georgetown to end their season.

On April 6, it was announced that head coach Austin Parkinson had mutually agreed with the university to depart the program after four seasons, in which he posted a 54–73 record alongside two WNIT appearances. Two days later on April 8, Purdue Fort Wayne head coach Maria Marchesano was announced as the program's new head coach. In five seasons with the Mastodons, Marchesano led the team to a 94–76 record, as well as a WNIT Super 16 appearance in the 2025–26 year.

== Offseason ==
=== Departures ===
Butler departures
Name	Num	Pos.	Height	Year	Hometown	Reason for departure
Gabby Wilke	1	Forward	6'2"	Sophomore	Beaver Dam, WI	Transferred to Loyola Chicago
Anna Wypych	2	Guard	6'0"	Freshman	Rockford, MI	Transferred to Michigan State
Kennedy Langham	4	Guard	5'7"	Junior	Harvest, AL	Transferred to Southern Miss
McKenzie Swanson	5	Forward	6'3"	(redshirt) Freshman	Rochester, MI	Transferred to Wake Forest
McKenna Johnson	7	Guard	5'9"	Sophomore	Wilmot, WI	Transferred to Green Bay
Lily Zeinstra	10	Guard	5'11"	Sophomore	Byron Center, MI	Transferred to Florida Gulf Coast
Mallory Miller	24	Forward	6'4"	(redshirt) Sophomore	Aberdeen, SD	Transferred to Florida
Caroline Dotsey	25	Forward	6'2"	Junior	Havertown, PA	Transferred to UMass
Lilly Stoddard	31	Forward	6'4"	Senior	Crown Point, IN	Graduated
Addison Baxter	33	Guard	5'9"	Freshman	Larwill, IN	Transferred to Miami (OH)

=== Incoming transfers ===
Butler incoming transfers
Name	Num	Pos.	Height	Year	Hometown	Previous school
Judit Valero	1	Guard	5'11"	Senior	Sant Feliu de Llobregat, Spain	FIU
Destiny Macharia	2	Guard	5'6"	Sophomore	Columbia, MD	Purdue Fort Wayne
Taya Ellis	6	Forward	6'1"	Senior	Toronto, Ontario	Bowling Green
Tamar Singer	13	Guard	5'4"	Junior	Haifa, Israel	Miami (OH)
Lili Krasovec	14	Forward	6'3"	Senior	Budapest, Hungary	Purdue Fort Wayne
Karina Bystry	20	Guard	5'9"	Sophomore	Englewood, TN	Northern Kentucky
Jacy Weisbrod	23	Guard	5'10"	Graduate Student	La Crosse, WI	Northern Michigan

=== Recruiting class ===
There was no 2026 recruiting class.

== Preseason ==
On October 1, 2026, the Big East Conference released its annual preseason coaches poll and awards. Butler was picked to finish tenth in the conference.

=== Preseason rankings ===
Big East Preseason Poll
Place	Team	Votes
1	UConn	100 (10)
2	Villanova	90 (1)
3	Creighton	78
4	St. John's	68
5	Seton Hall	67
6	Marquette	60
7	Providence	38
8	Georgetown	36
9	Xavier	29
10	Butler	21
11	DePaul	18
(#) first-place votes

=== Preseason All-Big East Team ===
No players were selected for the Preseason All-Big East Team.

=== Honorable Mentions ===
No players were selected as Preseason All-Big East Honorable Mentions.

== Roster ==
2026–27 Butler Bulldogs women's basketball team
Players
Coaches

Pos.	#	Name	Height	Year	Previous school	Hometown
G	0	Laniah Wills	6 ft 0 in (1.83 m)	Fr	Lapel High School	Anderson, IN
G	1	Judit Valero	5 ft 11 in (1.8 m)	Sr	Escola Verge de la Salut; FIU	Sant Feliu de Llobregat, Spain
G	2	Destiny Macharia	5 ft 11 in (1.8 m)	So	Oakland Mills High School; Purdue Fort Wayne	Columbia, MD
F	6	Taya Ellis	6 ft 1 in (1.85 m)	Sr	Royal Crown Academy; Bowling Green	Toronto, Ontario
F/C	9	Olivia Hastings	6 ft 3 in (1.91 m)	Fr	Willoughby Girls High School	Sydney, Australia
G	11	Nevaeh Jackson	6 ft 0 in (1.83 m)	Sr	Northrop High School; Valparaiso	Fort Wayne, IN
G	12	Saniya Jackson	6 ft 0 in (1.83 m)	RS Jr	Northrop High School; Valparaiso	Fort Wayne, IN
G	13	Tamar Singer	5 ft 4 in (1.63 m)	Jr	Ironi He High School; Miami (OH)	Haifa, Israel
F	14	Lili Krasovec	6 ft 3 in (1.91 m)	Sr	Winston-Salem Christian School; Purdue Fort Wayne	Budapest, Hungary
G	20	Karina Bystry	5 ft 9 in (1.75 m)	So	McMinn Central High School; Northern Kentucky	Englewood, TN
G	21	Lexi Baer	6 ft 2 in (1.88 m)	Fr	Peoria Notre Dame High School	Peoria, IL
G	23	Jacy Weisbrod	5 ft 10 in (1.78 m)	GS	Aquinas High School; Northern Michigan	La Crosse, WI
G	32	Sage Miskel	5 ft 6 in (1.68 m)	Fr	Whitefish Bay High School	Whitefish Bay, WI

Head coach

- Maria Marchesano (Butler)

Assistant coach(es)

- Steven Asher (James Madison)
- Latrell Fleming (Wisconsin)
- Karen Stack (Northwestern)
- Quincy Cunningham (Maryland)
- Chelsey Perry (UT Martin)

Legend

- (C) Team captain
- (S) Suspended
- (I) Ineligible
- (W) Walk-on
- Injured
- Current redshirt

Roster
Last update: September 4, 2026

== Schedule and results ==
Date time, TV	Rank^{#}	Opponent^{#}	Result	Record	High points	High rebounds	High assists	Site (attendance) city, state
Exhibition
October 28, 2026*; 7:00 p.m.		Franklin College	W 114–26		17 – N. Jackson	11 – Ellis	9 – Singer	Hinkle Fieldhouse (708); Indianapolis, IN
Regular season
November 2, 2026*; 11:00 a.m., ESPN+		Tennessee Tech	W 108–71	1–0	18 – S. Jackson	8 – Ellis	10 – Singer	Hinkle Fieldhouse (4,313); Indianapolis, IN
November 5, 2026*; 6:30 p.m., ESPN+		Lipscomb	W 104–57	2–0	15 – Krasovec	10 – Tied	13 – Singer	Hinkle Fieldhouse (678); Indianapolis, IN
November 8, 2026*; 1:00 p.m., ESPN+		at Central Michigan	W 74–42	3–0	21 – N. Jackson	12 – S. Jackson	6 – N. Jackson	McGuirk Arena (998); Mount Pleasant, MI
November 12, 2026*; 7:00 p.m., ESPN+		North Dakota State	W 68–61	4–0	18 – Valero	9 – Ellis	9 – Singer	Hinkle Fieldhouse (795); Indianapolis, IN
November 15, 2026*; 2:00 p.m., ESPN+		at UT Martin	W 73–46	5–0	17 – Singer	8 – Tied	5 – Singer	Skyhawk Arena (746); Martin, TN
November 18, 2026*; 6:30 p.m., ESPN+		Kent State	W 99–43	6–0	21 – S. Jackson	10 – S. Jackson	9 – Singer	Hinkle Fieldhouse (692); Indianapolis, IN
November 22, 2026*; 2:00 p.m., ESPN+		Eastern Michigan						Hinkle Fieldhouse; Indianapolis, IN
November 25, 2026*; 5:30 p.m.		vs. Oral Roberts; UNLV Thanksgiving Turkey Tip-Off						Thomas & Mack Center; Paradise, NV
November 27, 2026*; 5:30 p.m.		at UNLV; UNLV Thanksgiving Turkey Tip-Off						Thomas & Mack Center; Paradise, NV
December 4, 2026; 7:00 p.m., ESPN+		Seton Hall						Hinkle Fieldhouse; Indianapolis, IN
December 6, 2026; 3:00 p.m., ESPN+		at Marquette						Al McGuire Center; Milwaukee, WI
December 10, 2026; 7:00 p.m., ESPN+		at DePaul						Wintrust Arena; Chicago, IL
December 13, 2026*; 2:00 p.m., ESPN+		Indiana State						Hinkle Fieldhouse; Indianapolis, IN
December 19, 2026*; 12:00 p.m., ESPN+		Wright State						Hinkle Fieldhouse; Indianapolis, IN
December 22, 2026; 6:00 p.m., ESPN+		at Creighton						D. J. Sokol Arena; Omaha, NE
December 30, 2026; 6:00 p.m., ESPN+		St. John's						Hinkle Fieldhouse; Indianapolis, IN
January 6, 2027; 7:00 p.m., ESPN+		Providence						Hinkle Fieldhouse; Indianapolis, IN
January 10, 2027; 1:00 p.m., ESPN+		at Seton Hall						Walsh Gymnasium; South Orange, NJ
January 13, 2027; 7:00 p.m., ESPN+		at Villanova						Finneran Pavilion; Villanova, PA
January 16, 2027; 2:00 p.m., ESPN+		Xavier						Hinkle Fieldhouse; Indianapolis, IN
January 20, 2027; 7:00 p.m., ESPN+		Marquette						Hinkle Fieldhouse; Indianapolis, IN
January 24, 2027; 1:00 p.m., ESPN+		Creighton						Hinkle Fieldhouse; Indianapolis, IN
January 27, 2027; 7:00 p.m., ESPN+		at Providence						Alumni Hall; Providence, RI
January 30, 2027; 2:00 p.m., ESPN+		at Georgetown						McDonough Gymnasium; Washington, D.C.
February 4, 2027; 7:00 p.m., TruTV		UConn						Hinkle Fieldhouse; Indianapolis, IN
February 10, 2027; 6:30 p.m., ESPN+		at Xavier						Cintas Center; Cincinnati, OH
February 13, 2027; 2:00 p.m., ESPN+		Villanova						Hinkle Fieldhouse; Indianapolis, IN
February 18, 2027; 7:00 p.m., ESPN+		at St. John's						Carnesecca Arena; Queens, NY
February 21, 2027; 2:00 p.m., ESPN+		DePaul						Hinkle Fieldhouse; Indianapolis, IN
February 24, 2027; 7:00 p.m., ESPN+		Georgetown						Hinkle Fieldhouse; Indianapolis, IN
February 28, 2027; 2:00 p.m., FS1		at UConn						Harry A. Gampel Pavilion; Storrs, CT
Big East tournament
March 5–8, 2027; TBA		vs.						Mohegan Sun Arena; Uncasville, CT
*Non-conference game. ^{#}Rankings from AP Poll. (#) Tournament seedings in parentheses. All times are in Central.
