= Panther Creek High School =

Panther Creek High School may refer to the following schools in the United States:

- Panther Creek High School (North Carolina), in Cary, North Carolina
- Panther Creek High School (Valera, Texas), in Valera, Texas
- Panther Creek High School (Frisco, Texas)
