= St. John Vianney High School =

St. John Vianney High School may refer to one of several high schools in the United States:

- St. John Vianney High School (Missouri) in Kirkwood, Missouri
- St. John Vianney High School (New Jersey) in Holmdel Township, New Jersey
- St. John Vianney High School (Los Angeles) in Los Angeles, California
