= Pacific Tigers women's basketball =

American college basketball team

2026–27 Pacific Tigers women's basketball team
- University: University of the Pacific
- Head coach: Bradley Davis (12th season)
- Location: Stockton, California
- Arena: Alex G. Spanos Center (capacity: 6,150 (all seater) to 8,000)
- Conference: West Coast Conference
- Nickname: Tigers
- Colors: Black and orange

Uniforms
Home	Away

The Pacific Tigers women's basketball team is an NCAA Division I member that represents the University of the Pacific part of the West Coast Conference. The team is based in Stockton, California. They play their home games at the Alex G. Spanos Center.

== History ==
Pacific began play in 1975. They played in the NorCal Conference from 1975 to 1982. They played in the Big West Conference from 1984 to 2013.

They haven't played in the NCAA tournament, but they have played in the WNIT in 2012, 2013, 2014, 2015, 2019. To date, Pacific has recorded just four wins over a team ranked in the top 25 of AP Poll, with none since 2003. As of the end of the 2015–16 season, the Tigers have an all-time record of 544–612.

== Conference history ==
Conference	Years
NorCal	1975–1982
NorPac	1982–1984
Great West Conference	1984–2013
West Coast Conference	2014–present

== Postseason history ==
=== WNIT appearances ===
The Tigers have appeared in the Women's National Invitation Tournament five times. They have a record of 4–5.

Year	Round	Opponent	Result
2012	First Round; Second Round	Arizona State; San Diego	W 77–62; L 75–83
2013	First Round; Second Round; Third Round	Arkansas–Little Rock; Washington; Utah	W 69–65; W 85–78; L 55–60
2014	First Round	Oregon	L 63–92
2015	First Round	Sacramento State	L 79–83
2019	First Round; Second Round	Fresno State; Arizona	W 77–72; L 48–64
