= College Basketball on TNT Sports =

American television programming

- Genre: College basketball telecasts
- Country of origin: United States
- Original language: English
- No. of seasons: 15

Production
- Camera setup: Multi-camera
- Running time: 120 minutes or until end of game
- Production companies: TNT Sports (1982–83, 2011–present); CBS Sports (2011–present) (Note: March Madness games only)

Original release
- Network: TBS (1982–83, 2011–present); TNT (2011–present); TruTV (2011–present); HBO Max (2023–present)
- Release: 1982 – 1983
- Release: March 15, 2011 – present

Related
- NCAA March Madness

College Basketball on TNT Sports is the de facto title of college basketball coverage produced by TNT Sports for TNT, TBS, and TruTV.

TBS initially broadcast two regular-season games in the early-1980s as part of syndication arrangements with the Lorimar Sports Network. In 2010, Turner Sports and CBS Sports partnered on an agreement—since extended through 2032—to acquire the rights to the NCAA Division I men's basketball tournament, with the two broadcasters co-producing coverage across CBS and the Turner networks. Outside of the NCAA tournament, TNT Sports' regular-season coverage had largely been limited to neutral-site showcase events such as the Coaches vs. Cancer Classic, and later the Acrisure Series and Players Era Festival, and various one-off broadcasts on NBA TV highlighting HBCUs.

In the mid-2020s, TNT Sports began to acquire regular-season conference packages for the first time, beginning with a share of rights to the Big East Conference, and a package of Big 12 Conference games sublicensed from ESPN.

== History ==
=== Early TBS games (1982–1983) ===
On December 11, 1982, TBS (with the aid of more than 100 independent network affiliates and stations) broadcast a contest between Virginia and Georgetown (led by Ralph Sampson and Patrick Ewing respectively). The game in question (in which TBS paid approximately US$600,000 for the broadcasting rights) was called by Skip Caray and Abe Lemons. On November 26, 1983, TBS broadcast a contest between Kentucky and Louisville. TBS, in a joint venture with Sports Productions Inc. of Dallas, paid $600,000 for the rights to the game. Skip Caray and Joe Dean were on the call of the game.

=== NCAA tournament rights, one-off games (2011–2024) ===
On April 22, 2010, the National Collegiate Athletic Association (NCAA) reached a 14-year agreement, worth US$10.8 billion, with CBS and the Turner Broadcasting System to receive joint broadcast rights to the Division I men's college basketball tournament. This came after speculation that ESPN would try to obtain the rights to future tournament games. The NCAA took advantage of an opt-out clause in its 1999 deal with CBS (which ran through 2013, even though the NCAA had the option of ending the agreement after the 2010 championship) to announce its intention to sign a new contract with CBS and Turner Sports, The new contract came amid serious consideration by the NCAA of expanding the tournament to 68 teams.

The agreement, which runs through 2032 (extended from 2024 in 2016), stipulates that all games are available nationally. All First Four games air on truTV. During the first and second rounds, a featured game in each time "window" is broadcast terrestrially on CBS (15 games), while all other games are shown on TBS (12 games), TNT (12 games) or truTV (nine exclusive games, from 2024 on select TNT and/or TBS games may get a simulcast on TruTV when that network is not airing any games). Sweet 16 (regional semifinal) and Elite 8 (regional finals) games are split among CBS and TBS. In 2014 and 2015, Turner channels had exclusive rights to the Final Four, and CBS broadcast the championship game. Since 2016, rights to the Final Four and championship game alternate between Turner and CBS; the 2016 tournament marked the first time that the national championship game was not broadcast on over-the-air television. That year, CBS and Turner renewed their rights to the tournament through 2032.

In 2011, TruTV acquired the rights to the preseason Coaches vs. Cancer Classic, beginning with 2012. The tournament was the first regular season games aired by TNT Sports since 1983. The tournament was discontinued after the 2014 edition.

In 2021, the Turner-run NBA TV began airing selected games highlighting historically Black colleges and universities (HBCUs), beginning with a doubleheader on February 22, 2021 featuring men's and women's games between the Jackson State Tigers and Grambling State Tigers. They marked the first college basketball games broadcast by the channel. Later in the 2021–22 season, TNT would begin carrying the Invesco QQQ Legacy Classic—an early-season HBCU showcase, and the NBA would introduce the NBA HBCU Classic as a new component of NBA All-Star Weekend; the game would air in simulcast on NBA TV, TNT, and ESPN2. NBA TV also aired a package of four other regular-season SWAC games in February 2022 in commemoration of Black History Month.

In 2023, TNT and TruTV began airing the Hall of Fame Series, an early-season showcase event in Las Vegas featuring men's and women's games. The event was reduced to two games, one women's and one men's, for the 2024 edition. In 2024, TNT and TruTV also aired one game from the Hall of Fame Series in Baltimore.

=== Expansion of regular-season coverage (2021–present) ===
On June 27, 2024, TNT Sports announced that they had reached a six-year agreement with the Big East Conference, joining incumbent Fox and newcomer NBC, to air men's and women's college basketball games on their platforms; this marked TNT Sports' first regular-season conference package. TNT will air more than 65 games (more that 50 men's basketball games and at least 15 women's basketball games) over the course of the six-year deal. While most games will air on TNT, select games will air on TBS and TruTV, and all games stream on HBO Max.

On August 22, 2024, TNT Sports announced it had acquired the rights to the Acrisure Classic. As part of the agreement, 19 men's and women's basketball games over four days will air on TruTV and stream on Max. On September 10, 2024, TNT Sports announced it had acquired the rights to the Players Era Festival, with 12 games airing on TNT, TBS, TruTV or Max.

In November 2024, TNT Sports sublicensed a package of Big 12 Conference basketball from ESPN beginning in the 2025–26 season, as part of a larger settlement relating to Warner Bros. Discovery's loss of rights to the NBA. The HBCU Classic will move to NBC Sports in 2026 as part of NBC's new NBA contract.

== Coverage overview ==
=== Current rights ===
- NCAA March Madness
  - First Four exclusively on TruTV (2011–present)
  - 33 first and second round games (2011–present)
  - 12 Sweet Sixteen and Elite 8 games (2011–present)
  - Final four and Championship game every other year (2016–present)
- Big 12 Conference
  - 15 men's basketball games
  - Sublicense from ESPN
- Big East Conference
  - At least 50 men's basketball games
  - At least 15 women's basketball games
- Hall of Fame Series (2023–present)
- Acrisure Classic (2024–present)
- Acrisure Holiday Classic (2024–present)
- Acrisure Holiday Invitational (2024–present)
- Players Era Festival (2024–present)

=== Former rights ===
- NCAA March Madness
  - Final four (2014–2015)
- Coaches vs. Cancer Classic (2012–2014)
- Southwestern Athletic Conference (2021–2022)
- Invesco QQQ Legacy Classic (2021–2024)
- NBA-HBCU Classic game (2022–2025)

== Commentators ==
=== Current ===
==== Play-by-play ====
- Brian Anderson (lead) (2012–2014, 2024–present)
- Spero Dedes (2023–present)
- Angel Gray (2023–present)
- Michael Grady (2024–present)
- JB Long (2024–present)
- Cindy Brunson (2024–present)
- Chris Sylvester (2024–present)
- Brandon Gaudin (2025–present)
- Brendan Glasheen (2025–present)

==== Color ====
- Grant Hill (lead) (2021–present)
- Greg Anthony (2012–2014, 2025–present)
- Steve Smith (2012–2014, 2024–present)
- Candace Parker (2023–present)
- Christy Winters-Scott (2024–present)
- Robbie Hummel (2025–present)
- Jim Spanarkel (2025–present)
- Ronny Thompson (2025–present)
- Randolph Childress (2025–present)
- John Giannini (2025–present)

==== Reporters ====
- Taylor Rooks (2022–present)
- Allie LaForce (2023–present)
- Stephanie Ready (2024–present)
- Chris Haynes (2024–present)
- Jared Greenberg (2024–present)
- Lauren Jbara (2024–present)
- Autumn Johnson (2024–present)
- Nkwa Asonye (2024–present)
- Dennis Scott (2025–present)
- Nabil Karim (2025–present)
- Renee Montgomery (2025–present)
- Andy Katz (2025–present)
- Jahmai Webster (2025–present)
- Chelsea Sherrod (2025–present)
- Justin Stuckey (2025–present)

=== Former ===
==== Play-by-play ====
- Skip Caray (1982−1983)
- Ro Brown (2021)
- Stephanie Ready (2021–2023)
- Ro Parrish (2022)
- Brian Custer (2022, 2024–present)

==== Color ====
- Abe Lemons (1982)
- Joe Dean (1983)
- Deuce McAllister (2021)
- Santoria Black (2022)
- Brendan Haywood (2022)
- Monica McNutt (2023)

==== Reporters ====
- Craig Sager (2012)
- Seth Davis (2014)

== See also ==
- NCAA March Madness (TV program)
- College Basketball on CBS Sports
- College Football on TNT Sports
