= Hamden Hall Country Day School Field =

- Location: 1108 Whitney Avenue, Hamden, CT (school); 225 Skiff Street Hamden, Connecticut 06517 (field)
- Operator: Hamden Hall Country Day School
- Surface: Grass

Tenants
- Hamden Hall Country Day School; Connecticut Football Club Passion (CFC Passion)

The Hamden Hall Country Day School Field is a soccer and lacrosse facility located in Hamden, Connecticut, within the campus of Hamden Hall Country Day School. It forms part of the Hamden Hall Country Day School Athletics Complex along with the Beckerman Athletic Center and the Skiff Street Fields. It is the home of the Hamden Hall Country Day School team, and the Connecticut Football Club Passion (CFC Passion) of the Women's Premier Soccer League (WPSL).
