= 2026–27 Central Connecticut Blue Devils women's basketball team =

American college basketball season

2026–27 Central Connecticut Blue Devils women's basketball
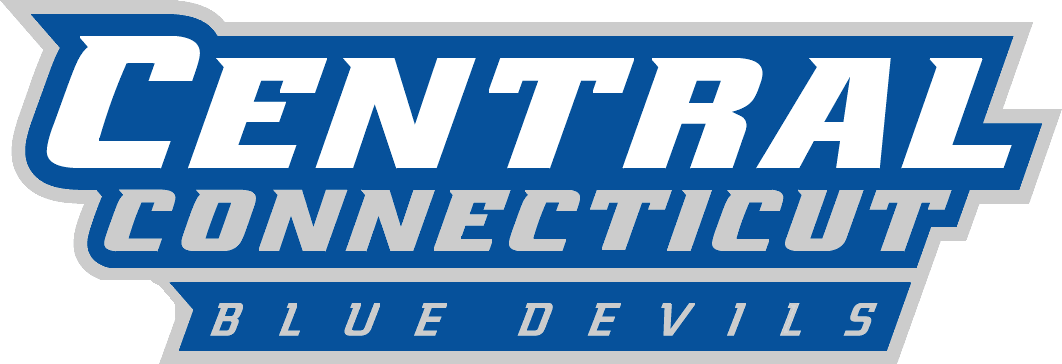
- Conference: Northeast Conference
- Record: 1–5 (0–0 NEC)
- Head coach: Kristin Caruso (2nd season)
- Assistant coaches: Courtney Gomez; Alexis Castro; Marigona Bacaliu
- Home arena: Detrick Gymnasium

2026–27 NEC women's basketball standings
	Conf.				Overall
Team	W		L	PCT	W		L	PCT
Chicago State	0	–	0	–	2	–	3	.400
Fairleigh Dickinson	0	–	0	–	2	–	3	.400
New Haven**	0	–	0	–	1	–	2	.333
Le Moyne	0	–	0	–	1	–	3	.250
Wagner	0	–	0	–	1	–	3	.250
Mercyhurst*	0	–	0	–	1	–	4	.200
Stonehill	0	–	0	–	0	–	4	.000
Central Connecticut	0	–	0	–	0	–	5	.000
LIU	0	–	0	–	0	–	5	.000
† 2027 NEC tournament winner * ineligible for the 2027 NCAA tournament due to transition from Division II ** ineligible for both the 2027 NEC tournament and the 2027 NCAA tournament due to transition from Division II; As of November 17, 2026

The 2026–27 Central Connecticut Blue Devils women's basketball team currently represents Central Connecticut State University during the 2026–27 NCAA Division I women's basketball season. The Blue Devils, led by second-year head coach Kristin Caruso, play their home games at the Detrick Gymnasium in New Britain, Connecticut, and compete as a member of the Northeast Conference (NEC).

== Previous season ==
In Kristin Caruso's first season, the Blue Devils finished the 2025–26 season a program worst 2–27 overall and 2–16 in NEC play, to finish last in the conference. They failed to qualify for the NEC tournament.

== Offseason ==
=== Departures ===
Central Connecticut departures
Name	Number	Pos.	Height	Year	Hometown	Reason for departure
Ilektra Lykaki	1	Guard	5'9"	Sophomore	Kavala, Greece	Transferred to Saginaw Valley State (D-II)
Kiyah Lewis	2	Forward	6'0"	Freshman	Fredericksburg, VA	Transferred to Georgia Southern
Trinity Barnes	4	Guard	5'9"	Senior	Gary, IN	Graduated
Kayla Henry	11	Forward	6'0"	Junior	East Hartford, CT	Graduated
Lucia Noin	12	Forward	6'0"	Senior	Santander, Spain	Graduated
Cierra Pearson	21	Guard	5'8"	Senior	Teaneck, NJ	Graduated
Reyda Ayva	23	Guard	5'9"	Freshman	Ankara, Turkey	Signed with TED Ankara Kolejliler of the Turkish Basketball League

=== Incoming transfers ===
There were no incoming transfers for the 2026–27 season.

=== Recruiting class ===
There was no 2026 recruiting class.

== Roster ==
2026–27 Central Connecticut Blue Devils women's basketball team
Players
Coaches

Pos.	#	Name	Height	Year	Previous school	Hometown
G	0	Na-Kyah Williams	5 ft 3 in (1.6 m)	So	Valley Prep	Bakersfield, CA
G	1	Jill Dingler	5 ft 8 in (1.73 m)	Fr	Darrow School	Columbia, CT
G	3	Christa Ramos	5 ft 7 in (1.7 m)	So	Neptune High School	Neptune, NJ
G	4	Isys Dunphy	5 ft 9 in (1.75 m)	Fr	Cushing Academy	Barrington, RI
G	5	Liana Salamone	5 ft 9 in (1.75 m)	Fr	The Ethel Walker School	East Hampton, CT
G	7	Valentina Vrcan	5 ft 9 in (1.75 m)	Fr	Putnam Science Academy	Tivat, Montenegro
F	10	Mathilda Toure	6 ft 2 in (1.88 m)	So	Storm King School	Stockholm, Sweden
G	13	Kyndal Box	5 ft 8 in (1.73 m)	Fr	Choate Rosemary Hall	McKinney, TX
G	14	Jessica Farrell	5 ft 7 in (1.7 m)	Jr	Millbrook School	Bethlehem, PA
F	15	Taryn Campbell	6 ft 0 in (1.83 m)	Fr	The Newman School	Taunton, MA
C	20	Nyasia McKelvey	6 ft 2 in (1.88 m)	Fr	Darrow School	Manchester, NH
F	22	Jah'Nae Stevens	6 ft 1 in (1.85 m)	So	Nottingham High School	Syracuse, NY
G	24	Nicora Patrick	5 ft 11 in (1.8 m)	So	Southwest Atlanta Christian Academy	Atlanta, GA
G/F	30	Vanyah Oteh	6 ft 0 in (1.83 m)	Fr	TPLS Christian Academy	New Kent, VA

Head coach

- Kristin Caruso (Connecticut)

Assistant coach(es)

- Courtney Gomez (Hartford)
- Alexis Castro (American International)
- Marigona Bacaliu (New Haven)

Legend

- (C) Team captain
- (S) Suspended
- (I) Ineligible
- (W) Walk-on
- Injured
- Current redshirt

Roster
Last update: September 29, 2026

== Schedule and results ==
Date time, TV	Rank^{#}	Opponent^{#}	Result	Record	High points	High rebounds	High assists	Site (attendance) city, state
Non-conference regular season
November 3, 2026*; 6:00 p.m., ESPN+		at VCU	L 43–67	0–1	20 – Dingler	8 – Dingler	2 – Tied	Siegel Center (412); Richmond, VA
November 5, 2026*; 6:00 p.m., ESPN+		at James Madison	L 38–77	0–2	9 – Dingler	6 – Salamone	1 – Tied	Atlantic Union Bank Center (412); Harrisonburg, VA
November 9, 2026*; 7:00 p.m., NEC Front Row		Coppin State	L 60–78	0–3	15 – Dingler	7 – Salamone	3 – Dingler	Detrick Gymnasium (492); New Britain, CT
November 12, 2026*; 7:00 p.m., NEC Front Row		Rider	L 45–56	0–4	13 – Tied	7 – Tied	3 – Dingler	Detrick Gymnasium (323); New Britain, CT
November 14, 2026*; 1:00 p.m., ESPN+		at UMass	L 48–96	0–5	7 – Patrick	6 – Tied	– Tied	Mullins Center (1,031); Amherst, MA
November 16, 2026*; 7:00 p.m., NEC Front Row		Colgate	W 68–61 ^{OT}	1–5	15 – Salamone	7 – McKelvey	4 – Vrcan	Detrick Gymnasium (489); New Britain, CT
November 18, 2026*; TBA		at UMass Lowell						Kennedy Family Athletic Complex; Lowell, MA
November 22, 2026*; TBA		at Vermont						Patrick Gym; Burlington, VT
November 29, 2026*; TBA		New Hampshire						Detrick Gymnasium; New Britain, CT
December 3, 2026*; TBA		at Sacred Heart						William H. Pitt Center; Fairfield, CT
December 5, 2026*; TBA		at Fordham						Rose Hill Gymnasium; The Bronx, NY
December 13, 2026*; TBA		Bryant						Detrick Gymnasium; New Britain, CT
December 15, 2026*; TBA		at Manhattan						Draddy Gymnasium; Riverdale, NY
December 20, 2026*; TBA		at Rhode Island						Ryan Center; Kingston, RI
NEC regular season
January 2, 2027; TBA		Chicago State						Detrick Gymnasium; New Britain, CT
January 7, 2027; TBA		Le Moyne						Detrick Gymnasium; New Britain, CT
January 9, 2027; TBA		Mercyhurst						Detrick Gymnasium; New Britain, CT
January 14, 2027; TBA		at New Haven						The Hazell Center; West Haven, CT
January 21, 2027; TBA		Stonehill						Detrick Gymnasium; New Britain, CT
January 23, 2027; TBA		at Fairleigh Dickinson						Bogota Savings Bank Center; Hackensack, NJ
January 28, 2027; TBA		at LIU						Steinberg Wellness Center; Brooklyn, NY
January 30, 2027; TBA		New Haven						Detrick Gymnasium; New Britain, CT
February 4, 2027; TBA		LIU						Detrick Gymnasium; New Britain, CT
February 6, 2027; TBA		at Stonehill						Merkert Gymnasium; North Easton, MA
February 11, 2027; TBA		at Le Moyne						Ted Grant Court; Syracuse, NY
February 13, 2027; TBA		at Mercyhurst						Owen McCormick Court; Erie, PA
February 20, 2027; TBA		Wagner						Detrick Gymnasium; New Britain, CT
February 24, 2027; TBA		at Chicago State						Jones Convocation Center; Chicago, IL
February 27, 2027; TBA		LIU						Detrick Gymnasium; New Britain, CT
March 4, 2027; TBA		at Wagner						Spiro Sports Center; Staten Island, NY
NEC tournament
March 8–14, 2027; TBA		vs.						TBD; TBD
*Non-conference game. ^{#}Rankings from AP Poll. (#) Tournament seedings in parentheses. All times are in Eastern.
