= 2026–27 New Haven Chargers women's basketball team =

American college basketball season

2026–27 New Haven Chargers women's basketball
- Conference: Northeast Conference
- Record: 0–0 (0–0 NEC)
- Head coach: Debbie Buff (9th season)
- Assistant coaches: Ariana Koivisto; Olivia Tucker; Bianca Pendleton
- Home arena: The Hazell Center

2026–27 NEC women's basketball standings
	Conf.				Overall
Team	W		L	PCT	W		L	PCT
New Haven**	0	–	0	–	1	–	0	1.000
Wagner	0	–	0	–	1	–	0	1.000
Central Connecticut	0	–	0	–	0	–	1	.000
Chicago State	0	–	0	–	0	–	1	.000
Fairleigh Dickinson	0	–	0	–	0	–	1	.000
Le Moyne	0	–	0	–	0	–	1	.000
LIU	0	–	0	–	0	–	1	.000
Mercyhurst*	0	–	0	–	0	–	1	.000
Stonehill	0	–	0	–	0	–	1	.000
† 2027 NEC tournament winner * ineligible for the 2027 NCAA tournament due to transition from Division II ** ineligible for both the 2027 NEC tournament and the 2027 NCAA tournament due to transition from Division II; As of November 5, 2026

The 2026–27 New Haven Chargers women's basketball team will represent the University of New Haven during the 2026–27 NCAA Division I women's basketball season. The Chargers, led by ninth-year head coach Debbie Buff, will play their home games at The Hazell Center in West Haven, Connecticut and compete as a member of the Northeast Conference (NEC).

This season will mark New Haven's second of a three-year transition period from Division II to Division I. As a result, the Chargers are ineligible to participate in the NCAA tournament until the 2028–29 season. They will also be ineligible for the NEC tournament until 2028.

== Previous season ==
In their first season in Division I, the Chargers finished the 2025–26 season 7–22 overall and 5–13 in NEC play, to finish in eighth in the conference. They were ineligible for the NEC tournament.

== Offseason ==
=== Departures ===
New Haven departures
Name	Number	Pos.	Height	Year	Hometown	Reason for departure
Aniya McDonald-Perry	10	Forward	5'9"	Senior	Middletown, CT	Graduated
Katelyn Simpson	11	Guard	5'9"	Junior	Baldwin, NY	TBD; not listed on roster
Lindsay Hogan	14	Guard/Forward	6'1"	Senior	Bayville, NY	Graduated
Katie Drozd	15	Guard/Forward	6'0"	Sophomore	Hastings-on-Hudson, NY	Entered transfer portal
Mikayla Taylor	21	Guard	5'9"	Freshman	Burlington, NJ	Departed from team
Mariah Pates	21	Forward	6'2"	Junior	Champlin, MN	TBD; removed from roster (Note: Pates was set to transfer in from NAIA St. Francis (IL), but was removed from the Chargers roster in mid-October during the offseason.)
Addisen Sulikowksi	25	Forward	5'10"	Sophomore	Saco, ME	Entered transfer portal
Shannon McCarthy	34	Center	6'1"	Freshman	Woburn, MA	Transferred to Saint Michael's (D-II)
Merit Innocent	44	Center	6'2"	Junior	Delta State, Nigeria	Transferred to Morgan State

=== Incoming transfers ===
New Haven incoming transfers
Name	Number	Pos.	Height	Year	Hometown	Previous school
Laura Vera Ramirez	15	Guard	5'11"	Sophomore	Estepona, Spain	Albany
Carla Ramirez	24	Guard	5'10"	Sophomore	Malaga, Spain	Central Arkansas
Claudia Lazaro	32	Forward	6'2"	Junior	Madrid, Spain	Rider

=== Recruiting class ===
There was no 2026 recruiting class.

== Roster ==
2026–27 New Haven Chargers women's basketball team
Players
Coaches

Pos.	#	Name	Height	Year	Previous school	Hometown
G/F	0	Tanavia Turpin	5 ft 8 in (1.73 m)	Fr	Hoosac School	Albany, NY
G	1	Renelle Granum	5 ft 7 in (1.7 m)	Jr	Baldwin Senior High School	Baldwin, NY
G	2	Eveani Okwuosa	5 ft 9 in (1.75 m)	Sr	Hamden Hall Country Day School	North Haven, CT
G	3	Teaira Kelly	5 ft 9 in (1.75 m)	So	Walnut Grove High School	Monroe, GA
G	4	Mallory Farr	5 ft 10 in (1.78 m)	So	The Shipley School	Wyncote, PA
G	5	Jasmine McKay	5 ft 4 in (1.63 m)	So	North Babylon High School	West Babylon, NY
C	10	Simone Pugh-Greaves	6 ft 0 in (1.83 m)	So	The Mary Louis Academy	Jamaica, NY
G	11	Ailani Davila	5 ft 2 in (1.57 m)	Fr	Bullard-Havens Technical High School	Bridgeport, CT
G	12	Samantha Battle	5 ft 10 in (1.78 m)	So	Miss Porter's School	East Hartford, CT
G	13	Kaydence Daniels	5 ft 2 in (1.57 m)	Fr	Boswell High School	Fort Worth, TX
G	14	Zanri Barnett	5 ft 3 in (1.6 m)	Fr	H.C. Wilcox Technical High School	Meriden, CT
G	15	Laura Vera Ramirez	5 ft 11 in (1.8 m)	So	Albany	Estepona, Spain
G	22	Jeeanna Pierantoni	5 ft 9 in (1.75 m)	So	Holy Cross High School	Cambria Heights, NY
G/F	23	Kate Hennessey	5 ft 11 in (1.8 m)	So	Alexandria Area High School	Alexandria, MN
G	24	Carla Ramirez	5 ft 10 in (1.78 m)	So	Central Arkansas	Malaga, Spain
G	25	Mia Gamon	5 ft 7 in (1.7 m)	Fr	Passaic County Technical Institute	Hawthorne, NJ
F	30	Tanaiya Clarke	5 ft 8 in (1.73 m)	Fr	John F. Kennedy High School	The Bronx, NY
F	33	Claudia Lazaro	6 ft 2 in (1.88 m)	So	Rider	Madrid, Spain
G	42	Schuyler Coles	5 ft 8 in (1.73 m)	Jr	Susquehanna Township High School	Harrisburg, PA

Head coach

- Debbie Buff (SUNY Cortland)

Assistant coach(es)

- Ariana Koivisto (Southern New Hampshire)
- Olivia Tucker (Sacred Heart)
- Bianca Pendleton

Legend

- (C) Team captain
- (S) Suspended
- (I) Ineligible
- (W) Walk-on
- Injured
- Current redshirt

Roster
Last update: August 23, 2026

== Schedule and results ==
Date time, TV	Rank^{#}	Opponent^{#}	Result	Record	High points	High rebounds	High assists	Site (attendance) city, state
Exhibition
October 21, 2026*; 7:30 p.m.		at Fairfield	L 41–107		10 – McKay	6 – Pugh-Greaves	6 – C. Ramirez	Leo D. Mahoney Arena (442); Fairfield, CT
NEC regular season
January 2, 2027; TBA		at LIU						Steinberg Wellness Center; Brooklyn, NY
January 6, 2027; TBA		at Wagner						Spiro Sports Center; Staten Island, NY
January 14, 2027; TBA		Central Connecticut						The Hazell Center; West Haven, CT
January 16, 2027; TBA		Chicago State						The Hazell Center; West Haven, CT
January 20, 2027; TBA		at Fairleigh Dickinson						Bogota Savings Bank Center; Hackensack, NJ
January 23, 2027; TBA		at Mercyhurst						Owen McCormick Court; Erie, PA
January 28, 2027; TBA		Stonehill						The Hazell Center; West Haven, CT
January 30, 2027; TBA		at Central Connecticut						Detrick Gymnasium; New Britain, CT
February 4, 2027; TBA		at Le Moyne						Ted Grant Court; Syracuse, NY
February 6, 2027; TBA		Wagner						The Hazell Center; West Haven, CT
February 11, 2027; TBA		Fairleigh Dickinson						The Hazell Center; West Haven, CT
February 13, 2027; TBA		at Chicago State						Jones Convocation Center; Chicago, IL
February 17, 2027; TBA		Le Moyne						The Hazell Center; West Haven, CT
February 20, 2027; TBA		Mercyhurst						The Hazell Center; West Haven, CT
February 24, 2027; TBA		at Stonehill						Merkert Gymnasium; North Easton, MA
March 4, 2027; TBA		LIU						The Hazell Center; West Haven, CT
*Non-conference game. ^{#}Rankings from AP Poll. (#) Tournament seedings in parentheses. All times are in Eastern.
