= Samantha Katz =

American creative director and curator

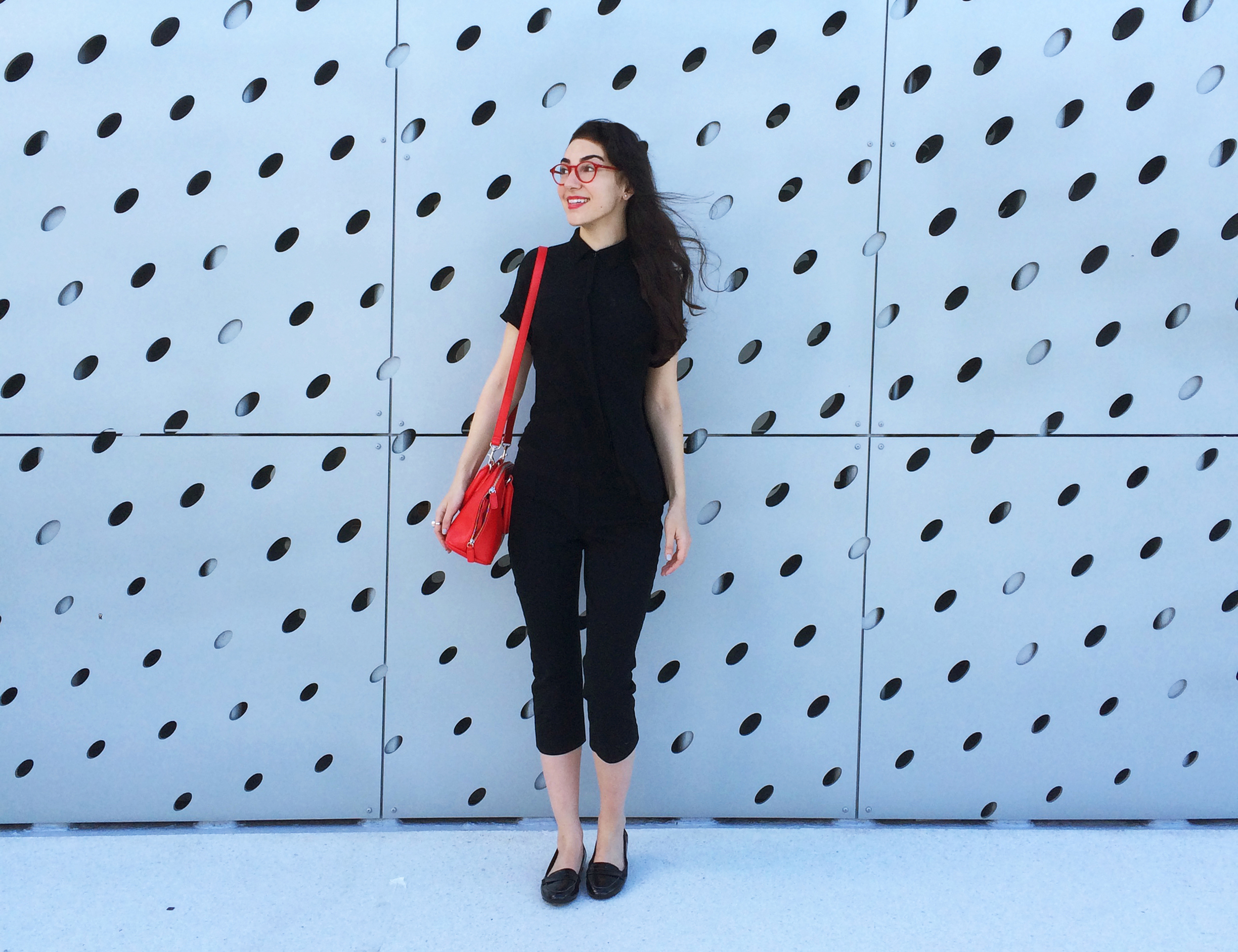
- Samantha Katz
- Born: 14 October 1985 (age 41); New Haven, Connecticut
- Education: Pratt Institute, Columbia University, New York University
- Occupations: Creative director, curator, programming executive.
- Notable credit(s): "Created Here", Gallery Glass
- Website: https://www.samanthakatz.art/

Samantha Katz (born October 14, 1985) is an American curator, creative director, and community builder. She was the founder of Created Here, an online platform that empowered creators by bringing them together with local consumers and art enthusiasts, and the co-producer of the Created Here TV series. Another notable, early project was Gallery Glass, a YouTube based series of interviews with artists employing the wearable technology Google Glass. Over the years, Katz curated arts programs for Selina, subsequently served as director of culture and community at NeueHouse, and currently leads programming and experience at Summit Series.

== Education and early life ==
Samantha Katz was born in New Haven, Connecticut and raised in Fairfield, Connecticut. She went to high school at Hamden Hall Country Day School in Hamden, Connecticut. Katz is a graduate of the Pratt Institute in Brooklyn, New York and did graduate coursework at Columbia University and New York University. Her parents are Joette Katz and Philip Rubin.

== Career progression ==
Samantha Katz was formerly a Senior Art Director at Duarte, the largest design firm in Silicon Valley. Prior to this, she was the Associate Creative Director at Sideways NYC leading the digital design for client Arcade Creative Group, a Sony Music Entertainment company.

In parallel with her career in the design field, Katz has followed her passion for curatorial work and arts advocacy. She has worked in a consultative and directorial capacity with a wide variety of artists, art professionals, and vendors to produce contemporary art exhibitions and creative platforms that appeal to a range of audiences. From 2008-2011 she managed installations at Art Basel, Miami Beach, including the urban contemporary fair Graffiti Gone Global. Katz is the co-founder of REPUBLIC Worldwide (formerly, REPUBLIC Brooklyn), a Brooklyn-based art collective. In 2013 she assumed the role of lead organizer of Arts in Bushwick, which hosts Bushwick Open Studios, New York City's largest open studio art event with over 600 local artists and galleries welcoming the public into their studios. Katz has also written exhibition reviews and artist profiles for art publications Whitewall Magazine and Paper Magazine.

Building on her work in the arts industry, Katz launched Created Here between 2018 and 2019. The online platform features local artists and makers in creative communities across the United States.

Katz expanded into hospitality as Global Creative Lead at Selina from 2019 to 2021, working on creative concepts, arts programming, and development plans for its U.S. locations. She subsequently served as Director of Culture and Community at NeueHouse from 2021 to 2022, leading cultural programming and community initiatives across its New York and Los Angeles locations.

In 2022, Katz joined Summit Series as Chief Programming and Content Officer, overseeing programming and experience for the organization's gatherings.

== Recognition ==
In March 2014 Brooklyn Magazine selected her as one of "The 100 Most Influential People in Brooklyn Culture," citing her work as co-organizer of Arts in Bushwick, and the Gallery Glass series. Brooklyn Magazine then interviewed Katz in 2015 about the past, present, and future of Brooklyn culture.

In April 2014, Katz and Peter Rynsky, her former boyfriend and then lead-singer of the pop band Darlings, were selected as one of "10 Bushwick Power Couples" by the Bushwick Daily.

Samantha Katz, along with projects that she has been involved with, has appeared frequently in the press and online media, including: Brooklyn Magazine, Business Insider, Design Boom, Grit Daily, New York Times, Observer, TED, Wall Street Journal, Whitewall Magazine, and YouTube.

== Other notable projects ==
Gallery Glass. The Gallery Glass's channel on YouTube was the first art interview project using Google Glass and received extensive media coverage, including: About.com Fine Art, Arte Fuse, Business Insider, DNAInfo New York, Native Underground., and other stories. Katz hosted a workshop for Google Glass at the 2013 TED Women's conference in San Francisco, where she spoke about this project and the intersection of art and technology.

SEED and Fly Ranch. Katz was a member of the team behind SEED symbiotic coevolution , one of the top ten proposals in the Land Art Generator Initiative’s LAGI 2020 Fly Ranch design challenge , in partnership with the Burning Man project. This was a collaborative effort. The team included Samantha Katz, Woody Nitibhon, Henry O’Donnell, Lola Lafia, Eric Baczuk, John Hilmes, Max Schwitalla, and Colin O’Donnell.

Becoming Together. In 2026, Katz organized Becoming Together , a three-day, multidisciplinary arts festival in New Orleans. Coverage in the Observer also identified her as a co-owner of 1:1 Gallery.

== Personal Life ==
Katz married architect Alan Paukman in June 2025.
