= Mitch Feierstein =

British-American investor, banker and writer

Mitchell B. Feierstein is a British-American investor, banker and writer. He has worked as a columnist for the Daily Mail and works as a columnist for The Independent and the Huffington Post. Feierstein appears regularly as a financial commentator on SKY, BBC and RT’s Keiser Report. In 2012 he published his first book, Planet Ponzi, which gives his perspective of the global credit crisis.

Feierstein stood as a Brexit Party candidate in the 2019 UK General Election for the Reading East constituency. He came fifth with 1.5% of the vote.

== Early life and education ==
Feierstein was born in New York City, and educated at Hamden Hall Country Day School in Hamden, Connecticut. Feierstein studied economics at Vassar College and was on the Vassar College President's International Advisory Committee 2009 until it was disbanded in 2018. Feierstein served on the Council from Jan 9, 2009 to June 30, 2018.

== Career ==
Feierstein worked for several broker dealers and banks on Wall Street in the 1980s and was a pioneer in liquidity of interest rate derivative products on Wall Street in the 1990s. He worked as Senior Portfolio Manager of the Cheyne Carbon Fund, part of one of the largest hedge-fund groups operating in Europe. He acts as a consultant for a number of governments in their disaster and contingency planning and has testified before the UK Parliament on regulation of carbon credits. He is CEO of the Glacier Environmental Fund. He also part-owns a vineyard in Tuscany, Italy. He lives in London and New York.

== Planet Ponzi ==
This book suggests that governments, having borrowed to bail out private companies, are now issuing worthless bonds to finance their borrowing.
