= Freshkills Park =

Public park in Staten Island, New York

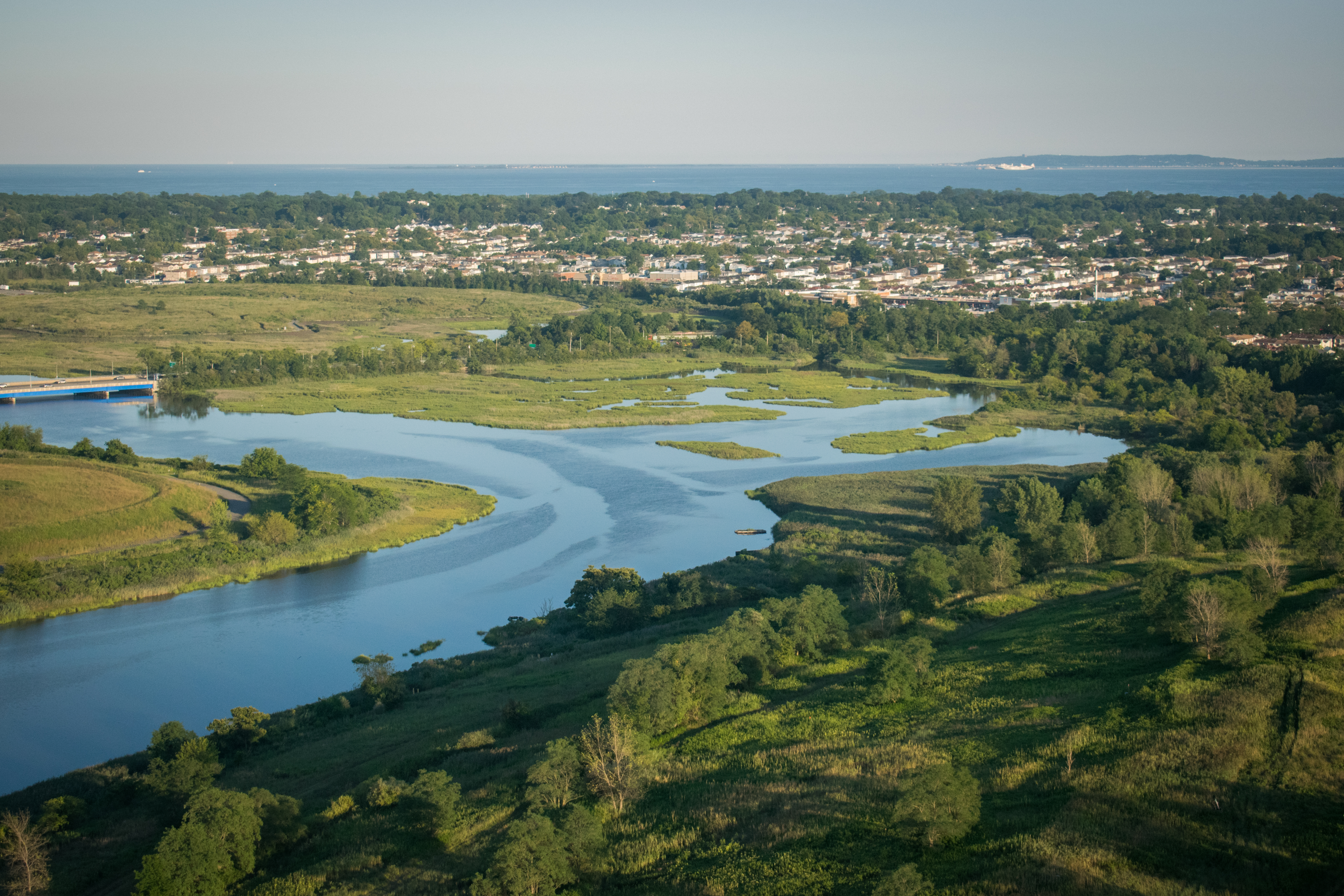
- View of Freshkills Park in 2025
- Interactive map of Freshkills Park
- Type: Public park
- Location: Fresh Kills Landfill site, Staten Island, New York City, United States
- Nearest city: New York City
- Coordinates: 40°34′52″N 74°11′20″W
- Area: 2,200 acres (8.9 km^{2})
- Created: 2008
- Operator: New York City Department of Parks and Recreation
- Open: 2012 (partial); 2035–2037 (scheduled, full)

Freshkills Park is a public park being built atop a former landfill on Staten Island. At about 2,200 acres (8.9 km^{2}), it will be the largest park developed in New York City since the 19th century. Its construction began in October 2008 and is slated to continue in phases for approximately 30 years. When fully developed by 2035–2037, Freshkills Park will be the second-largest park in New York City, after Pelham Bay Park in the Bronx, and almost three times the size of Central Park in Manhattan. The park is envisioned as a regional destination that integrates open grasslands, waterways and engineered structures into a cohesive and dynamic unit for social, cultural and physical activity, learning and play. Sections of the park will be connected by a circulation system for vehicles and a network of paths for bicyclists and pedestrians. The New York City Department of Parks and Recreation (NYC Parks) is managing the project with the New York City Department of Sanitation.

== History ==
=== Landfill operations and state regulations ===
The Fresh Kills Landfill actively received New York City's municipal waste from 1947 to 2001. The subsoil was clay, with a layer of sand and silt on top. There were tidal wetlands, forests, and freshwater wetlands. The area was considered prime for development because the value of wetlands in buffering storm surges and filtering water was not understood at the time.

The initial plan was to raise the elevation of the land by filling for three years and then to redevelop it as a multi-use area with residential, recreational, and industrial components. However, the landfill never closed and received waste for over 50 years. New York City's population was growing and generating more trash and it was easy to expand the filling operation on Staten Island. The landfill accepted garbage from 1948 through 2001. By 1955, the landfill was the largest in the world. At the peak of its operation, the contents of twenty barges – each carrying 650 tons of garbage – were added to the site every day. By 1996, the mound had reached a height of 175 feet (53 m), taller than the Statue of Liberty in nearby New York Harbor. Although Staten Islanders had tried many times to close operations at the landfill, litigation efforts finally met with success that year, when regulations were passed to close the landfill by 2002. Under strong community pressure and with support of the United States Environmental Protection Agency (EPA), the landfill site was closed on March 22, 2001, but it was reopened after the September 11 attacks on the World Trade Center in Manhattan. Virtually all the materials from the World Trade Center site were sent to the temporarily reopened landfill for examination. Thousands of detectives and forensic evidence specialists worked for over 1.7 million hours at Fresh Kills Landfill to try to recover the remains of people killed in the attacks. A final count of 4,257 human remains were recovered, and more than 1,600 personal effects; the City's Chief Medical Examiner retains custody of all still-unidentified materials at a facility within the National 9/11 Memorial in Manhattan. The remaining materials at Fresh Kills were then buried in a 40-acre (160,000 m^{2}) portion of the landfill, known as West Mound. Afterward, the landfill facility was closed permanently, in anticipation of the park on the site.

=== Capping ===
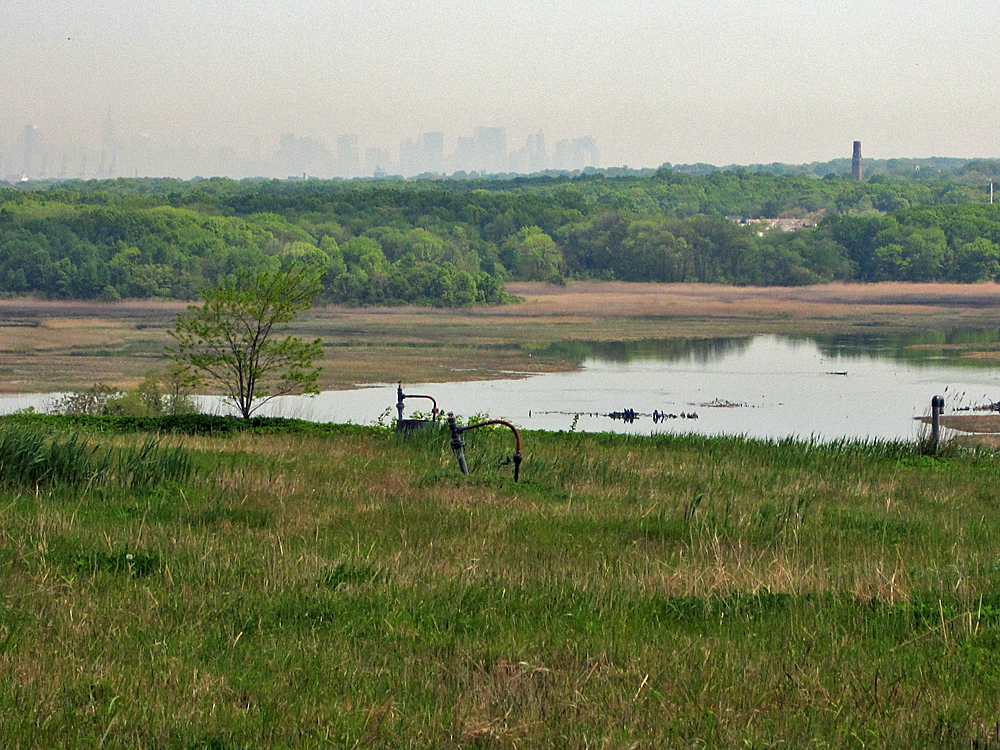
Freshkills Park in 2010 with Manhattan in the distant background

Two of the four mounds at the site – the mounds referred to as North and South – were capped in the late 1990s with an impermeable cover separating waste from the environment. Capping of the East Mound, which will become East Park, began in 2007 and was completed in 2011. Capping of the West Mound began in 2011 and was scheduled to be complete in 2022. The Department of Sanitation works with the New York State Department of Environmental Conservation (NYSDEC) to meet regulations for environmentally sound landfill closure; it will also maintain operating responsibility for on-site environmental monitoring and control systems after capping. NYC Parks must also meet NYSDEC's regulations – no area of the park is permitted to open to public access until it meets state standards for public access.

NYC Parks completed and released the Final Generic Environmental Impact Statement (FGEIS) for the Freshkills Park project in May 2009. The document evaluates the entirety of the proposed project and its likely effects on the neighboring community. In compliance with state and local law, the FGEIS is designed to identify "any adverse environmental effects of proposed actions, assess their significance, and propose measures to eliminate or mitigate significant impacts". A Supplemental Environmental Impact Statement (SEIS) was completed in October 2009, which specifically focuses on the impact of proposed road construction through the East Park section of the plan and examines alternatives to the current plan. These environmental assessments are updated on a project-by-project basis, during the design phase, to ensure that any new or undisclosed environmental impacts are also identified and addressed.

=== International design competitions ===
In 2001, the New York City Department of City Planning (NYCDCP) held an international design competition following a Request for Proposal (RFP) for a landscape architecture firm to develop a master plan for the park. The competition's first round was open to all participants, and in August 2001, six were chosen as finalists: James Corner Field Operations, Hargreaves Associates, Mathur/da Cunha, Tom Leader Studio, John McAslan + Partners, RIOS Associates, Inc., and Sasaki Associates.

In 2003, James Corner Field Operations was selected as the winner of the competition and was hired to prepare a draft master plan to guide long-term development of the park. The Draft Master Plan was prepared over the following years and released in March 2006. In 2006, NYC Parks became the lead agency overseeing the park development process.

The Land Art Generator Initiative used Freshkills Park as the focus of its "LAGI 2012" competition, to design a large-scale artwork that would feed the city's electrical grid. Although construction of the winning design was not guaranteed, the initiative brought international attention to the aesthetic potential of renewable energy infrastructure.

== Planning ==
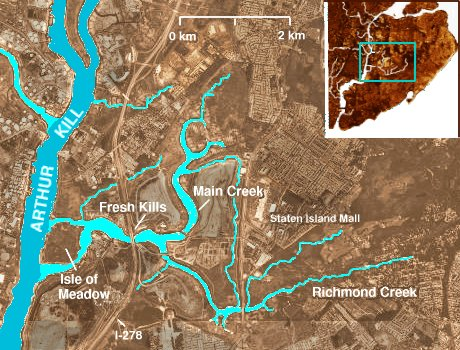
The Freshkills Park site from above

=== Draft Master Plan ===
The 2006 Draft Master Plan for Freshkills Park envisioned the site as five parks in one, each with a distinct character and programming approach. The Plan was developed with input gathered in meetings and workshops between the project team and Staten Islanders, nonprofit groups, and government officials. Goals emerging from the outreach efforts included: roads to ease traffic congestion surrounding the Freshkills Park site; active recreational uses such as kayaking and sports fields; and projects generating and using renewable sources of energy. The planning process also included the input of a community advisory group consisting of local leaders and stakeholders.

The five areas envisioned in the draft plan are described below:

- North Park: The 223-acre (0.90 km^{2}) North Park will retain much of its natural character in order to expand the neighboring habitat of the William T. Davis Wildlife Refuge. North Park will largely be devoted to wildlife and passive recreation, though trails for biking, walking, and hiking will also be included
- South Park: Like North Park, South Park contains a significant amount of natural woodland and wetland, but also contains ample flat, non-wetland space for active recreational uses. The draft master plan for this 425-acre (1.72 km^{2}) site envisioned tennis courts, trails, athletic facilities, and an equestrian center.
- East Park: At 482 acres (1.95 km^{2}), meadows, trails, playing fields and picnic areas were proposed for East Park. A golf course was also suggested as a means to generate revenue for operations. A road system connecting Richmond Avenue and the West Shore Expressway has also been proposed for East Park.
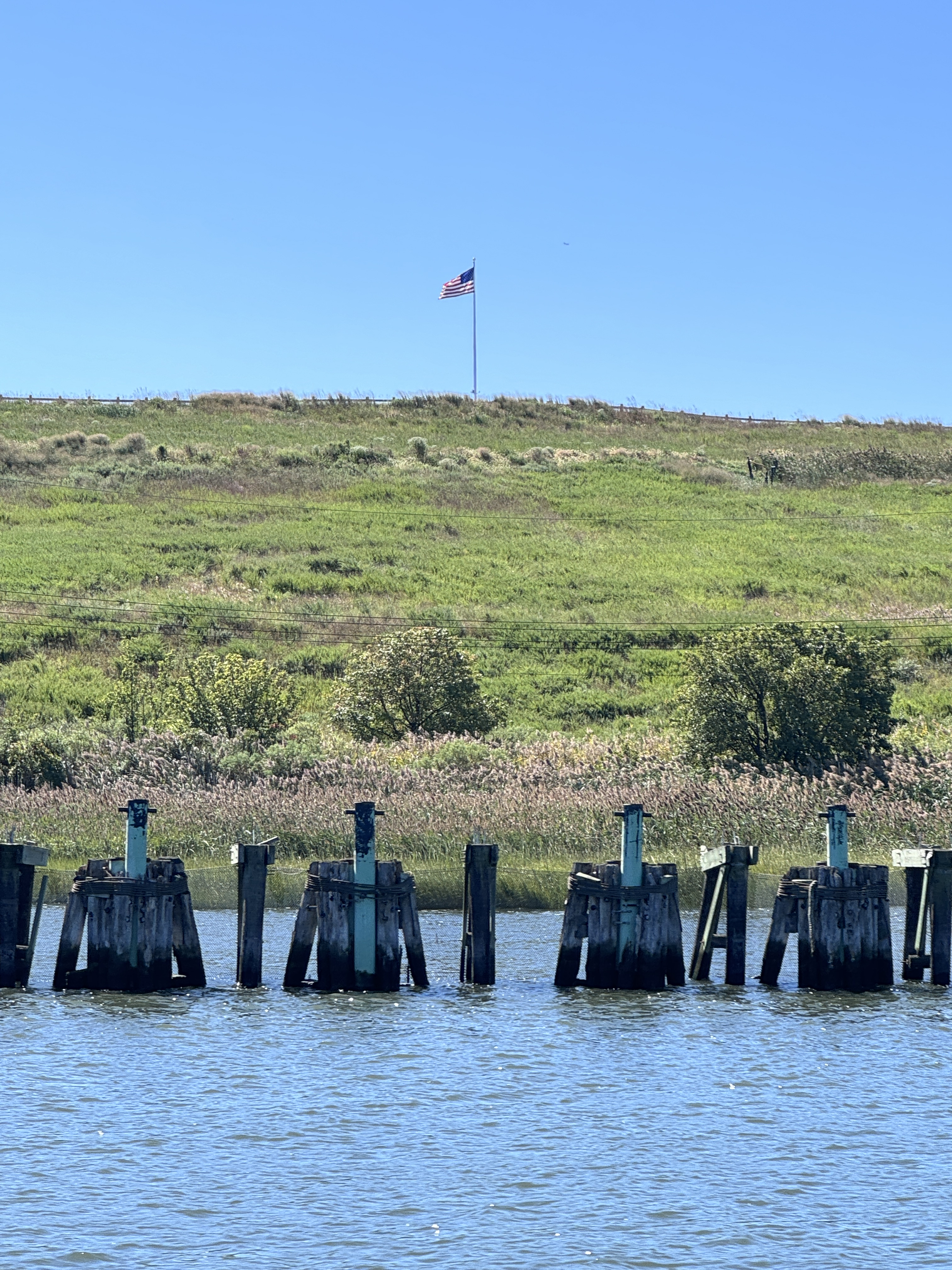
- West Mound at Freshkills Park, the former landfill where debris from the World Trade Center was taken for sorting and internment after the terrorist attacks on September 11, 2001. The site is marked with a flag.
  West Park: After the September 11 attacks at the World Trade Center, about 1.2 million short tons (1.1 million long tons) of materials were brought to the West Park site where it was carefully screened and sifted. All discernible materials were removed and taken to the Office of Chief Medical Examiner of the City of New York for identification and safekeeping. The Department of Sanitation agreed to cap and close this mound, and no formal planning has been undertaken by Parks for this area.
- The Confluence: Located at the meeting point of the site's two creeks is a 70-acre (280,000 m^{2}) area planned as the center of the park. The Confluence will host visitor and information centers, restaurants, a marina, event spaces and landscapes for passive recreation. Waterborne access to the area has been proposed via the waterways that previously permitted barge deliveries to the landfill.

=== Capital projects ===
Capital projects entail a complex and lengthy design and permitting process, involving both City and State agencies, to ensure that all landfill infrastructure as well as the developing ecological resources are adequately protected. NYC Parks started work around the outer edges of the park, both to show the city's commitment to transforming the former landfill to local neighborhoods and because permitting was easier. Those projects include:

- Schmul Park: The first project in the Travis neighborhood, the renovation of Schmul Park was completed in 2012. Formerly an asphalt and chain-link fence playground, it was converted into a park with new play surfaces, basketball and handball courts, permeable substrate and concrete, and native plantings.
- Owl Hollow Fields: NYC Parks then undertook the construction of Owl Hollow Fields on the southeastern side of the park. This project included a circular path, parking, and four new AstroTurf soccer fields, two lighted for night use, near the intersection of Arden Avenue and Arthur Kill Road. The project was completed in 2013.
- New Springville Greenway: In 2015, NYC Parks completed construction of the New Springville Greenway, a new bike and pedestrian path that runs along the edge of Richmond Avenue.
- North Park Phase 1: In 2017, NYC Parks broke ground for North Park Phase 1, a 21-acre arc path that begins at the park entrance and takes visitors along the side of north mound to expansive views of the creeks and will include a composting comfort station, a bird tower and a wetland overlook deck. This park also has a path connecting it to Schmul Park. This section opened on October 15, 2023, and was the first part of Freshkills Park itself to be completed.
- South Park Anchor Park: In 2016, $30 million was allocated to Freshkills Park as part of the city's Anchor Parks program. The South Park Anchor Park project is in design and includes walking paths, two multi-purpose fields, a comfort station and parking.

=== Renewable energy ===
In March 2012, NYC released a Request for Proposals for the construction of solar and/or wind energy facilities at Freshkills Park. A project for the construction of solar arrays was awarded to SunEdison in November 2013. NYC was in contractual negotiations with SunEdison when the company went bankrupt in 2016. No further work has been done with renewable energy at Freshkills Park since then.

== Wildlife ==
The in-construction park is home to a diverse array of wildlife; a 2015 BioBlitz recorded 320 species of plants and animals in a 24-hour period. Ongoing ecological research projects are tracking some of the changes in wildlife as the site transforms from industrial space to green space. Current projects include fish population monitoring, grassland habitat characterization, migratory bird banding, grassland bird monitoring, and bat population monitoring. Over 200 species of birds have been seen at the park either nesting, migrating, hunting, or foraging. Freshkills Park is now home to the largest nesting colony of grasshopper sparrows in New York State, a "Species of Special Concern" that began nesting on-site in 2015. Common wildlife species at Freshkills Park include red-winged blackbirds, American goldfinches, red-tailed hawks, American kestrels, ospreys, ring-necked pheasants, tree swallows, turkey vultures, northern harriers, Savannah sparrows, American woodcocks, white-tailed deer, muskrats, red foxes, northern snapping turtles and diamondback terrapins.

== Programs ==
While Freshkills Park continues its development, NYC Parks and the Freshkills Park Alliance have hosted events and programs including active recreation on-site, in areas generally closed to the public. On bi-annual "Discovery Days" in the spring and fall, visitors have the opportunity to kayak, bike, hike, and fly kites in a closed section of the park. The Freshkills Park Alliance runs educational and public programs, including kayaking, cycling and running events, citizen science, art projects, tours, and field trips. In 2020, Freshkills Park began offering virtual field trips and programming. The Freshkills Park office regularly partners with cultural and academic organizations for these programs.
