= 2026–27 Le Moyne Dolphins women's basketball team =

American college basketball season

2026–27 Le Moyne Dolphins women's basketball
- Conference: Northeast Conference
- Record: 1–5 (0–0 NEC)
- Head coach: Nick DiPillo (3rd season)
- Assistant coaches: Shelby Case; Mya Jackson; Emma Boslet
- Home arena: Le Moyne Events Center

2026–27 NEC women's basketball standings
	Conf.				Overall
Team	W		L	PCT	W		L	PCT
Fairleigh Dickinson	0	–	0	–	3	–	4	.429
Chicago State	0	–	0	–	2	–	4	.333
Central Connecticut	0	–	0	–	2	–	5	.286
Le Moyne	0	–	0	–	1	–	4	.200
New Haven**	0	–	0	–	1	–	4	.200
Wagner	0	–	0	–	1	–	4	.200
Mercyhurst*	0	–	0	–	1	–	5	.167
Stonehill	0	–	0	–	0	–	5	.000
LIU	0	–	0	–	0	–	6	.000
† 2027 NEC tournament winner * ineligible for the 2027 NCAA tournament due to transition from Division II ** ineligible for both the 2027 NEC tournament and the 2027 NCAA tournament due to transition from Division II; As of November 22, 2026

The 2026–27 Le Moyne Dolphins women's basketball team currently represents Le Moyne College during the 2026–27 NCAA Division I women's basketball season. The Lakers, led by third-year head coach Nick DiPillo, play their home games on Ted Grant Court located in the Le Moyne Events Center in Syracuse, New York, and compete in their final season as a member of the Northeast Conference (NEC) before their move to the Metro Conference in 2027.

This season will mark Le Moyne's first official year as a full member of Division I, following the completion of their three-year transition period from Division II on July 1, 2026. As a result, the Dolphins are now eligible to participate in the NCAA tournament.

== Previous season ==
The Dolphins finished the 2025–26 season 12–21 overall and 9–9 in NEC play, to finish in a tie for fourth place in the conference with Wagner. As the No. 5 seed in the NEC tournament, they defeated No. 4 Wagner 54–47 in the quarterfinals, before falling to top-seeded Fairleigh Dickinson in the semifinals to end their season.

== Offseason ==
=== Departures ===
Le Moyne departures
Name	Number	Pos.	Height	Year	Hometown	Reason for departure
Sierra Linnin	4	Guard	5'8"	Senior	Valley Cottage, NY	Graduated
Michelina Lombardi	5	Guard	5'6"	Senior	Wynantskill, NY	Graduated
Amya McLeod	21	Guard	5'6"	(redshirt) Sophomore	Rome, NY	Transferred to Daemen (D-II)

=== Incoming transfers ===
Le Moyne incoming transfers
Name	Num.	Pos.	Height	Year	Hometown	Previous school
Kendal Moxey	55	Center	6'3"	5th Year (Note: Moxey is currently eligible to play a final year in the 2026-27 season following a preliminary injunction granted in October. She filed a lawsuit against the NCAA challenging the new age-based eligibility model, which excluded the class of 2022.)	Centreville, MD	Bowling Green

=== Recruiting class ===
There was no 2026 recruiting class.

== Roster ==
2026–27 Le Moyne Dolphins women's basketball team
Players
Coaches

Pos.	#	Name	Height	Year	Previous school	Hometown
G	0	Jessica Wangolo	5 ft 7 in (1.7 m)	Sr	Capital Courts Academy; Buffalo	Ottawa, Ontario
G	1	Peyton Dincher	5 ft 10 in (1.78 m)	So	Jersey Shore Area High School	Jersey Shore, PA
G	2	Eli Clark	5 ft 8 in (1.73 m)	Jr	Ocean Township High School	Oakhurst, NJ
G	3	Gianna Nichols	5 ft 5 in (1.65 m)	Fr	St. George's School	Sturbridge, MA
G	5	Ava Bluhm	5 ft 10 in (1.78 m)	Fr	Royal Crown School	Cambridge, Ontario
G	10	Sophia Bonnell	5 ft 5 in (1.65 m)	Jr	Horseheads High School; SUNY New Paltz	Horseheads, NY
F	11	Ava Johnson	6 ft 2 in (1.88 m)	So	The Steward School	Richmond, VA
F	12	Sydney Postell	5 ft 10 in (1.78 m)	Sr	Churchville-Chili High School	Churchville, NY
F	14	Rachel Lynch	6 ft 3 in (1.91 m)	So	Putnam Science Academy	Cork, Ireland
F	22	Praise Matthews	6 ft 1 in (1.85 m)	So	Dallastown Area High School	Red Lion, PA
G	23	Ava Lucarotti	5 ft 8 in (1.73 m)	So	Cathedral Preparatory School	Erie, PA
G	33	Kayden Clark	5 ft 8 in (1.73 m)	So	Manasquan High School	Oakhurst, NJ
F	45	Ashley Buragas	6 ft 1 in (1.85 m)	Sr	John Jay Senior High School; Mineral Area College	Hopewell Junction, NY
F	55	Kendal Moxey	6 ft 3 in (1.91 m)	Sr	Queen Anne's County High School; Bowling Green	Centreville, MD

Head coach

- Nick DiPillo (Fairleigh Dickinson)

Assistant coach(es)

- Shelby Case (UIC)
- Mya Jackson (Cincinnati)
- Emma Boslet (Saint Joseph's)

Legend

- (C) Team captain
- (S) Suspended
- (I) Ineligible
- (W) Walk-on
- Injured
- Current redshirt

Roster
Last update: August 21, 2026

== Schedule and results ==
Date time, TV	Rank^{#}	Opponent^{#}	Result	Record	High points	High rebounds	High assists	Site (attendance) city, state
Non-conference regular season
November 3, 2026*; 7:30 p.m., ESPN+		at SMU	L 36–72	0–1	8 – Postell	6 – Buragas	3 – Moxey	Moody Coliseum (943); University Park, TX
November 5, 2026*; 7:30 p.m., ESPN+		at No. 15 TCU	L 41–96	0–2	11 – Nichols	10 – Moxey	3 – Moxey	Schollmaier Arena (2,236); Fort Worth, TX
November 10, 2026*; 6:00 p.m., NEC Front Row		SUNY Geneseo	W 67–52	1–2	20 – Nichols	12 – Buragas	4 – Nichols	Ted Grant Court (267); Syracuse, NY
November 13, 2026*; 5:30 p.m., ESPN+		at UCF	L 44–77	1–3	17 – Nichols	5 – Tied	3 – Nichols	Addition Financial Arena (827); Orlando, FL
November 16, 2026*; 11:00 a.m., ACCNX		at Miami (FL)	L 40–87	1–4	11 – Nichols	5 – Buragas	2 – Tied	Watsco Center (4,627); Miami, FL
November 21, 2026*; 1:00 p.m., ESPN+		at Niagara	L 63–72	1–5	19 – Moxey	6 – Tied	2 – Tied	Gallagher Center (187); Lewiston, NY
November 24, 2026*; 11:00 a.m., NEC Front Row		Bucknell						Ted Grant Court; Syracuse, NY
November 29, 2026*; 1:00 p.m., NEC Front Row		Lafayette						Ted Grant Court; Syracuse, NY
December 3, 2026*; 11:00 a.m., ESPN+		at Manhattan						Draddy Gymnasium; The Bronx, NY
December 6, 2026*; 2:00 p.m., NEC Front Row		at Cornell						Newman Arena; Ithaca, NY
December 13, 2026*; 12:00 p.m., NEC Front Row		Kentucky						Ted Grant Court; Syracuse, NY
December 16, 2026*; 6:00 p.m., NEC Front Row		Syracuse						Ted Grant Court; Syracuse, NY
December 19, 2026*; 1:00 p.m., NEC Front Row		Colgate						Ted Grant Court; Syracuse, NY
December 21, 2026*; 1:00 p.m., NEC Front Row		at St. Bonaventure						Reilly Center; St. Bonaventure, NY
December 30, 2026*; 2:00 p.m., NEC Front Row		Marywood						Ted Grant Court; Syracuse, NY
NEC regular season
January 2, 2027; 1:00 p.m., NEC Front Row		Mercyhurst						Ted Grant Court; Syracuse, NY
January 7, 2027*; 7:00 p.m., NEC Front Row		at Central Connecticut						Detrick Gymnasium; New Britain, CT
January 9, 2027*; 2:00 p.m., NEC Front Row		at Stonehill						Merkert Gymnasium; North Easton, MA
January 14, 2027; 6:00 p.m., NEC Front Row		Fairleigh Dickinson						Ted Grant Court; Syracuse, NY
January 16, 2027; 1:00 p.m., NEC Front Row		Wagner						Ted Grant Court; Syracuse, NY
January 23, 2027; 1:00 p.m., NEC Front Row		LIU						Ted Grant Court; Syracuse, NY
January 28, 2027; 8:00 p.m., NEC Front Row		at Chicago State						Jones Convocation Center; Chicago, IL
February 4, 2027; 6:00 p.m., NEC Front Row		New Haven						Ted Grant Court; Syracuse, NY
February 6, 2027; 1:00 p.m., NEC Front Row		at LIU						Steinberg Wellness Center; Brooklyn, NY
February 11, 2027; 6:00 p.m., NEC Front Row		Central Connecticut						Ted Grant Court; Syracuse, NY
February 13, 2027; 1:00 p.m., NEC Front Row		Stonehill						Ted Grant Court; Syracuse, NY
February 17, 2027; 7:00 p.m., NEC Front Row		at New Haven						Hazell Center; West Haven, CT
February 20, 2027; 1:00 p.m., NEC Front Row		Chicago State						Ted Grant Court; Syracuse, NY
February 25, 2027; 7:00 p.m., NEC Front Row		at Wagner						Spiro Sports Center; Staten Island, NY
February 27, 2027; 7:00 p.m., NEC Front Row		at Fairleigh Dickinson						Bogota Savings Bank Center; Hackensack, NJ
March 4, 2027; 6:00 p.m., NEC Front Row		at Mercyhurst						Owen McCormick Court; Erie, PA
NEC tournament
March 8–14, 2027; TBA		vs.						TBD; TBD
*Non-conference game. ^{#}Rankings from AP Poll. (#) Tournament seedings in parentheses. All times are in Eastern.
