= 2026–27 VCU Rams women's basketball team =

American college basketball season

2026–27 VCU Rams women's basketball
- Conference: Atlantic 10 Conference
- Record: 1–0 (0–0 A-10)
- Head coach: Chelsea Banbury (1st season)
- Assistant coaches: Jaime Gluesing; Brittany Brown; Brenlan Quinlan-Huertas; Callie Scheier
- Home arena: Siegel Center

2026–27 Atlantic 10 women's basketball standings
	Conf.				Overall
Team	W		L	PCT	W		L	PCT
Fordham	0	–	0	–	1	–	0	1.000
George Mason	0	–	0	–	1	–	0	1.000
George Washington	0	–	0	–	1	–	0	1.000
Loyola Chicago	0	–	0	–	1	–	0	1.000
Richmond	0	–	0	–	1	–	0	1.000
St. Bonaventure	0	–	0	–	1	–	0	1.000
VCU	0	–	0	–	1	–	0	1.000
Dayton	0	–	0	–	0	–	0	–
Saint Joseph's	0	–	0	–	0	–	0	–
Davidson	0	–	0	–	0	–	1	.000
Duquesne	0	–	0	–	0	–	1	.000
La Salle	0	–	0	–	0	–	1	.000
Rhode Island	0	–	0	–	0	–	1	.000
Saint Louis	0	–	0	–	0	–	1	.000
† 2027 A10 tournament winner As of November 5, 2026

The 2026–27 VCU Rams women's basketball team currently represents Virginia Commonwealth University during the 2026–27 NCAA Division I women's basketball season. The Rams, led by first-year head coach Chelsea Banbury, play their home games at the Siegel Center in Richmond, Virginia, and compete as a member of the Atlantic 10 Conference.

== Previous season ==
The Rams finished the 2025–26 season 8–23 overall and 4–14 in A-10 play, finishing in a tie for twelfth in the conference with Duquesne. As the No. 13 seed in the A-10 tournament, they lost to the No. 12 seeded Dukes 52–60 in the first round to end their season.

On February 2, 2026, VCU announced the firing of head coach Beth O'Boyle in the midst of her 12th season with the program, after an 8–15 start to the season. Assistant coach Kirk Crawford taking over for the rest of the season, and no reason was given for her dismissal.

On March 31, following the season, High Point head coach Chelsea Banbury was named the program's new head coach following seven seasons with the Panthers, leading them to four conference regular season championships, three conference titles and three NCAA tournament appearances.

== Offseason ==
=== Departures ===
VCU departures
Name	Num.	Pos.	Height	Year	Hometown	Reason for departure
Ty Williams	0	Guard	5'7"	(redshirt) Senior	New Orleans, LA	Graduated
Makenna White	5	Forward	6'2"	Senior	Farrell, PA	Graduated
Hawa Doumbouya	7	Forward	6'7"	(redshirt) Sophomore	Bronx, NY	Transferred to West Virginia
Mary-Anna Asare	11	Guard	5'8"	Senior	Perckering, ON	Transferred to Virginia
Tanya Tkachenko	14	Guard/Forward	6'2"	Senior	Berdiansk, Ukraine	Graduated
Isabel Whitelaw	31	Forward	6'3"	Sophomore	Shepparton, Australia	Left team, signed with the NBL1's Bendigo Braves

=== Incoming transfers ===
VCU incoming transfers
Name	Num.	Pos.	Height	Year	Hometown	Previous school
Lexi Fleming	0	Guard	5'5"	Graduate Student	Cincinnati, OH	High Point
Macy Spencer	13	Guard	5'8"	Senior	Katy, TX	High Point

=== Recruiting class ===
There was no 2026 recruiting class.

== Preseason ==
On October 19, 2026, the Atlantic 10 Conference released its annual preseason poll and honor awards. VCU was picked to finish seventh in the conference.

=== Preseason rankings ===
Atlantic 10 Preseason Poll
Place	Team	Votes
1	Saint Joseph's	196 (14)
2	Davidson	181
3	George Washington	141
4	George Mason	138
5	Dayton	127
6	Saint Louis	123
7	VCU	106
8	Richmond	101
9	Rhode Island	97
10	La Salle	78
11	St. Bonaventure	59
12	Duquesne	51
13	Fordham	40
14	Loyola Chicago	32
(#) first-place votes

=== Preseason All-Conference Teams ===
Preseason All Conference Teams
Player	Year	Position	Team
Macy Spencer	Senior	Guard	Second
Katarina Kneževic	Junior	Guard/Foward	Third

=== Preseason All-Conference Defensive Team ===
No players were named to the Preseason All-Conference Defensive Team.

== Roster ==
Years are listed according to the new NCAA age-based eligibility model.

2026–27 VCU Rams women's basketball team
Players
Coaches

Pos.	#	Name	Height	Year	Previous school	Hometown
G	0	Lexi Fleming	5 ft 5 in (1.65 m)	GS	Mercy McAuley High School; High Point	Cincinnati, OH
G	2	Cyriah Griffin	5 ft 7 in (1.7 m)	Jr	Menchville High School	Virginia Beach, VA
G	8	Daija Preston	5 ft 7 in (1.7 m)	So	Carrollton High School	Douglasville, GA
F	9	Nicole Toresani	5 ft 10 in (1.78 m)	Fr		Milan, Italy
F	10	Ann Zachariah	6 ft 2 in (1.88 m)	RS Sr	Kansas State Life Prep Academy; Colorado State	Kerala, India
F	11	GiGi Quist	6 ft 2 in (1.88 m)	Fr	SPIRE Academy	Quebec City, QC
G	12	Patricia Augustin	5 ft 10 in (1.78 m)	So	Capital Courts Academy	Longueuil, Quebec
G	13	Macy Spencer	5 ft 8 in (1.73 m)	Sr	Obra D. Tompkins High School; High Point	Katy, TX
G	14	Alexis Riggs	5 ft 11 in (1.8 m)	Fr	Monut Zion Prep	Potomac, MD
G	17	Ada Toribio Saez	5 ft 5 in (1.65 m)	Fr		Madrid, Spain
G	22	Laia Crespín	5 ft 5 in (1.65 m)	So	Barca CBS	Calafell, Spain
F	32	Lucía Sotelo	6 ft 1 in (1.85 m)	Sr	Ensino Lugo	Ourense, Spain
G/F	34	Katarina Kneževic	6 ft 0 in (1.83 m)	Jr	Arizona	Belgrade, Serbia
F	42	Lucy Ghaifan	6 ft 0 in (1.83 m)	Sr	Central Catholic High School; Grand Canyon	Grand Island, NE

Head coach

- Chelsea Banbury (Florida Gulf Coast)

Assistant coach(es)

- Jaime Gluesing (Florida Gulf Coast)
- Brittany Brown (Florida Gulf Coast)
- Brendan Quinlan-Huertas (High Point)
- Callie Scheier (High Point)

Legend

- (C) Team captain
- (S) Suspended
- (I) Ineligible
- (W) Walk-on
- Injured
- Current redshirt

Roster
Last update: October 29, 2026

== Schedule and results ==
Date time, TV	Rank^{#}	Opponent^{#}	Result	Record	High points	High rebounds	High assists	Site (attendance) city, state
Regular season
November 3, 2026*; 6:00 p.m., ESPN+		Central Connecticut	W 67–43	1–0	22 – Spencer	10 – Zachariah	4 – Toribio Saez	Siegel Center (412); Richmond, VA
November 12, 2026*; 6:00 p.m., ESPN+		Virginia Tech						Siegel Center; Richmond, VA
November 16, 2026*; 6:00 p.m., ESPN+		North Carolina Central						Siegel Center; Richmond, VA
November 19, 2026*; 6:00 p.m.		at Maine						Memorial Gymnasium; Orono, ME
November 23, 2026*; 6:00 p.m.		Morgan State						Siegel Center; Richmond, VA
November 27, 2026*; 7:30 p.m.		vs. Coppin State; 4 Tha Culture Holiday Classic						Henrico Sports & Events Center; Henrico, VA
November 28, 2026*; 12:00 p.m.		vs. Ohio State; 4 Tha Culture Holiday Classic						Henrico Sports & Events Center; Henrico, VA
November 29, 2026*; 12:00 p.m.		vs. Florida State; 4 Tha Culture Holiday Classic						Henrico Sports & Events Center; Henrico, VA
December 2, 2026; 6:00 p.m.		Dayton						Siegel Center; Richmond, VA
December 6, 2026*; 2:00 p.m.		Charlotte						Siegel Center; Richmond, VA
December 13, 2026*; 2:00 p.m.		New Hampshire						Siegel Center; Richmond, VA
December 21, 2026*; 1:00 p.m.		Southern Miss						Siegel Center; Richmond, VA
December 30, 2026; 6:00 p.m.		St. Bonaventure						Siegel Center; Richmond, VA
January 2, 2027; 2:00 p.m.		at Duquesne						UPMC Cooper Fieldhouse; Pittsburgh, PA
January 6, 2027; 11:00 a.m.		at Fordham						Rose Hill Gymnasium; Bronx, NY
January 9, 2027; 2:00 p.m.		Loyola Chicago						Siegel Center; Richmond, VA
January 17, 2027; 2:00 p.m.		at Richmond; Capital City Classic						Robins Center; Richmond, VA
January 20, 2027; 6:00 p.m.		at George Washington						Charles E. Smith Center; Washington, D.C.
January 23, 2027; 2:00 p.m.		La Salle						Siegel Center; Richmond, VA
January 27, 2027; 6:00 p.m.		at Rhode Island						Ryan Center; Kingston, RI
January 31, 2027; 2:00 p.m.		Saint Louis						Siegel Center; Richmond, VA
February 3, 2027; 7:00 p.m.		at George Mason; Rivalry						EagleBank Arena; Fairfax, VA
February 6, 2027; 2:00 p.m.		Duquesne						Siegel Center; Richmond, VA
February 10, 2027; 11:00 a.m.		at Dayton						UD Arena; Dayton, OH
February 14, 2027; 12:00 p.m., USA		Richmond; Capital City Classic						Siegel Center; Richmond, VA
February 17, 2027; 11:00 a.m.		Saint Joseph's						Siegel Center; Richmond, VA
February 20, 2027; 1:00 p.m.		at St. Bonaventure						Reilly Center; St. Bonaventure, NY
February 24, 2027; 6:00 p.m.		George Mason; Rivalry						Siegel Center; Richmond, VA
February 27, 2027; 1:00 p.m.		at Davidson						John M. Belk Arena; Davidson, NC
A-10 tournament
March 3–7, 2027; TBA		vs.						Henrico Sports & Events Center; Henrico, VA
*Non-conference game. ^{#}Rankings from AP Poll. (#) Tournament seedings in parentheses. All times are in Eastern.
