= 2026–27 Fairleigh Dickinson Knights women's basketball team =

American college basketball season

2026–27 Fairleigh Dickinson Knights women's basketball
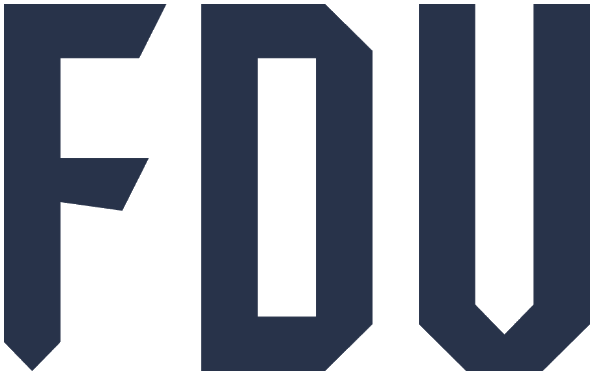
- Conference: Northeast Conference
- Record: 3–4 (0–0 NEC)
- Head coach: Stephanie Gaitley (4th season)
- Assistant coaches: Jeremy Thompson; Ty Rozier; Nickie Carter
- Home arena: Bogota Savings Bank Center

2026–27 NEC women's basketball standings
| | Conf. | | | | Overall |
| Team | W | | L | PCT | W | | L | PCT |
|---|---|---|---|---|---|---|---|---|
| Fairleigh Dickinson | 0 | – | 0 | – | 3 | – | 4 | .429 |
| Chicago State | 0 | – | 0 | – | 2 | – | 4 | .333 |
| Central Connecticut | 0 | – | 0 | – | 2 | – | 5 | .286 |
| New Haven** | 0 | – | 0 | – | 1 | – | 3 | .250 |
| Wagner | 0 | – | 0 | – | 1 | – | 3 | .250 |
| Le Moyne | 0 | – | 0 | – | 1 | – | 4 | .200 |
| Mercyhurst* | 0 | – | 0 | – | 1 | – | 5 | .167 |
| Stonehill | 0 | – | 0 | – | 0 | – | 5 | .000 |
| LIU | 0 | – | 0 | – | 0 | – | 6 | .000 |
† 2027 NEC tournament winner * ineligible for the 2027 NCAA tournament due to transition from Division II ** ineligible for both the 2027 NEC tournament and the 2027 NCAA tournament due to transition from Division II; As of November 20, 2026

The 2026–27 Fairleigh Dickinson Knights women's basketball team currently represents Fairleigh Dickinson University during the 2026–27 NCAA Division I women's basketball season. The Knights, led by fourth-year head coach Stephanie Gaitley, play their home games at the Bogota Savings Bank Center in Hackensack, New Jersey, and compete as a member of the Northeast Conference (NEC).

== Previous season ==
The Knights finished the 2025–26 season 30–5 overall and 18–0 in NEC play, to finish as conference regular season champions for the second consecutive year. Their 30 wins set a program record, surpassing the previous record of 29 set by the 2024–25 team. It was also the second straight season that the Knights went undefeated in the NEC.

As the top seed in the NEC tournament, they defeated No. 8 Saint Francis and No. 5 Le Moyne in the quarterfinals and semifinals respectively, before advancing to the championship game, defeating No. 3 LIU 79–57 to capture their second consecutive conference title and earn the NEC automatic bid to the NCAA tournament.

In the tournament, the Knights were seeded No. 15 in the Sacramento #4 Regional. However, they lost 48–58 to No. 2 Iowa in the first round to end their season.

== Offseason ==
=== Departures ===
Fairleigh Dickinson departures
| Name | Number | Pos. | Height | Year | Hometown | Reason for departure |
|---|---|---|---|---|---|---|
| Madlena Gerke | 0 | Guard/Forward | 5'10" | Graduate student | Riga, Latvia | Graduated |
| Akeelah Lafleur | 2 | Forward | 6'3" | Freshman | Willingboro, NJ | Transferred to Towson |
| Bella Toomey | 3 | Forward | 6'2" | Junior | Philadelphia, PA | Transferred to UNC Wilmington |
| Ava Renninger | 4 | Guard | 5'6" | Sophomore | Yardley, PA | Transferred to Towson |
| Talia Baptiste | 5 | Guard | 5'7" | Sophomore | Maplewood, NJ | TBD; not listed on roster |
| Sydney Stokes | 12 | Forward | 6'1" | Sophomore | Linwood, NJ | Entered transfer portal |
| Joi Johnson | 14 | Forward | 5'11" | Sophomore | Ewing, NJ | Transferred to Jackson State |
| Tyler Edwards | 23 | Guard | 5'6" | Sophomore | Townsend, DE | Transferred to Loyola Maryland |
| Kailee McDonald | 24 | Guard | 5'9" | Sophomore | Lowell, MA | Left team |
| Lilly Parke | 45 | Forward | 6'2" | Senior | Auckland, New Zealand | Graduated, transferred to Idaho State |

=== Incoming transfers ===
Fairleigh Dickinson incoming transfers
| Name | Number | Pos. | Height | Year | Hometown | Previous school |
|---|---|---|---|---|---|---|
| Jordis Reisner | 3 | Guard | 5'9" | Junior | Graz, Austria | Central Arizona (NJCAA) |
| Iriona Gravley | 7 | Forward | 6'0" | Junior | Williamstown, NJ | Drexel |
| Ane Valle | 11 | Guard | 5'11" | Senior | Vitoria-Gasteiz, Spain | Felician (D-II) |
| Sofia Tavarez | 23 | Guard | 5'5" | Sophomore | Cortland, NY | Connecticut College (D-III) |

=== Recruiting class ===
There was no 2026 recruiting class.

== Roster ==
2026–27 Fairleigh Dickinson Knights women's basketball team
Players
Coaches

| Pos. | # | Name | Height | Year | Previous school | Hometown |
|---|---|---|---|---|---|---|
| G | 1 | Megan Ngo | 5 ft 4 in (1.63 m) | Fr | Upper Dublin High School | Fort Washington, PA |
| G/F | 2 | Ally Kaminski | 5 ft 10 in (1.78 m) | Fr | Roy C. Ketcham High School | Wappingers Falls, NY |
| G | 3 | Jordis Reisner | 5 ft 9 in (1.75 m) | Jr | BORG Monsberger; Central Arizona College | Graz, Austria |
| G | 4 | Analyse Intenzo | 5 ft 11 in (1.8 m) | Fr | Moorestown High School | Moorestown, NJ |
| G | 6 | Ophir Weintraub | 5 ft 6 in (1.68 m) | Fr | HaYovel High School | Herzliya, Israel |
| F | 7 | Iriona Gravley | 6 ft 0 in (1.83 m) | Jr | Williamstown High School; Drexel | Williamstown, NJ |
| G | 11 | Ane Valle | 5 ft 11 in (1.8 m) | Sr | IES Mendebaldea BHI; Felician | Vitoria-Gasteiz, Spain |
| G | 12 | Theresa Biladi | 5 ft 7 in (1.7 m) | So | Hamilton Girls' High School | Hamilton, New Zealand |
| F | 15 | Leah Crosby | 6 ft 0 in (1.83 m) | So | St. Thomas Aquinas High School | Plainfield, NJ |
| G | 16 | Ryan Pruznik | 5 ft 5 in (1.65 m) | Fr | Upper St. Clair High School | Pittsburgh, PA |
| F | 20 | Madison Stuart | 5 ft 11 in (1.8 m) | So | Eastern Regional High School | Voorhees, NJ |
| G | 21 | Rebecca Osei-Owusu (C) | 5 ft 11 in (1.8 m) | Sr | Monsignor Scanlan High School | Brooklyn, NY |
| G | 22 | Jada Elston (C) | 5 ft 8 in (1.73 m) | Sr | Middle Township High School | Woodbine, NJ |
| G | 23 | Sofia Tavarez | 5 ft 5 in (1.65 m) | So | Walter Panas High School; Connecticut College | Cortland, NY |
| G | 25 | Reese Downey | 5 ft 6 in (1.68 m) | So | Absegami High School | Galloway, NJ |
| C | 33 | Maggie Bishopp | 6 ft 4 in (1.93 m) | Fr | Hoosac School | Montgomery, NY |

Head coach

- Stephanie Gaitley (Villanova)

Assistant coach(es)

- Jeremy Thompson (Muhlenberg)
- Ty Rozier (Fordham)
- Nickie Carter (Fairleigh Dickinson)

Legend

- (C) Team captain
- (S) Suspended
- (I) Ineligible
- (W) Walk-on
- Injured
- Current redshirt

Roster
Last update: August 21, 2026

== Schedule and results ==
| Date time, TV | Rank^{#} | Opponent^{#} | Result | Record | High points | High rebounds | High assists | Site (attendance) city, state |
Exhibition
| October 18, 2026*; 2:00 p.m. | | at Villanova | L 45–68 | | 9 – Osei-Owusu | 7 – Osei-Owusu | 4 – Osei-Owusu | Finneran Pavilion (1,531); Villanova, PA |
Non-conference regular season
| November 2, 2026*; 7:00 p.m., ESPN+ | | at Baylor | L 66–87 | 0–1 | 11 – Tied | 11 – Crosby | 4 – Crosby | Foster Pavilion (2,843); Waco, TX |
| November 4, 2026*; 8:00 p.m., SECN+ | | at No. 6 Texas | L 65–85 | 0–2 | 17 – Downey | 7 – Valle | 5 – Weintraub | Moody Center (9,688); Austin, TX |
| November 9, 2026*; 7:00 p.m. | | East Stroudsburg | W 82–46 | 1–2 | 17 – Crosby | 10 – Crosby | 3 – Crosby | Bogota Savings Bank Center (205); Hackensack, NJ |
| November 12, 2026*; 7:00 p.m., YES Network | | Manhattan | W 58–55 | 2–2 | 14 – Osei-Owusu | 14 – Osei-Owusu | 2 – Weintraub | Bogota Savings Bank Center (402); Hackensack, NJ |
| November 15, 2026*; 1:00 p.m., B1G+ | | at No. 17 Ohio State | L 49–93 | 2–3 | 17 – Downey | 6 – Biladi | 4 – Weintraub | Schottenstein Center (4,029); Columbus, OH |
| November 17, 2026*; 7:00 p.m., YES Network | | Rider | W 63–54 | 3–3 | 19 – Crosby | 15 – Crosby | 2 – Tied | Bogota Savings Bank Center (334); Hackensack, NJ |
| November 19, 2026*; 8:00 p.m., SECN+ | | at No. 9 LSU | L 33–91 | 3–4 | 10 – Tied | 8 – Crosby | 4 – Biladi | Pete Maravich Assembly Center (8,999); Baton Rouge, LA |
| November 23, 2026*; 7:00 p.m., NEC Front Row | | Saint Peter's | | | | | | Bogota Savings Bank Center; Hackensack, NJ |
| November 28, 2026*; TBA | | at Monmouth | | | | | | OceanFirst Bank Center; West Long Branch, NJ |
| December 2, 2026*; TBA | | at Lafayette | | | | | | Kirby Sports Center; Easton, PA |
| December 6, 2026*; TBA | | at Delaware State | | | | | | Memorial Hall; Dover, DE |
| December 9, 2026*; TBA | | NJIT | | | | | | Bogota Savings Bank Center; Hackensack, NJ |
| December 19, 2026*; TBA | | Youngstown State; FDU Christmas Classic Semifinal | | | | | | Bogota Savings Bank Center; Hackensack, NJ |
| December 20, 2026*; TBA | | TBD; FDU Christmas Classic | | | | | | Bogota Savings Bank Center; Hackensack, NJ |
| December 29, 2026*; TBA | | Bloomfield College | | | | | | Bogota Savings Bank Center; Hackensack, NJ |
NEC regular season
| January 6, 2027; TBA | | at Chicago State | | | | | | Jones Convocation Center; Chicago, IL |
| January 9, 2027; TBA | | LIU | | | | | | Bogota Savings Bank Center; Hackensack, NJ |
| January 14, 2027; TBA | | at Le Moyne | | | | | | Ted Grant Court; Syracuse, NY |
| January 16, 2027; TBA | | at Mercyhurst | | | | | | Owen McCormick Court; Erie, PA |
| January 20, 2027; TBA | | New Haven | | | | | | Bogota Savings Bank Center; Hackensack, NJ |
| January 23, 2027; TBA | | Central Connecticut | | | | | | Bogota Savings Bank Center; Hackensack, NJ |
| January 28, 2027; TBA | | at Wagner | | | | | | Spiro Sports Center; Staten Island, NY |
| January 30, 2027; TBA | | Stonehill | | | | | | Bogota Savings Bank Center; Hackensack, NJ |
| February 4, 2027; TBA | | at Central Connecticut | | | | | | Detrick Gymnasium; New Britain, CT |
| February 6, 2027; TBA | | Chicago State | | | | | | Bogota Savings Bank Center; Hackensack, NJ |
| February 11, 2027; TBA | | at New Haven | | | | | | Hazell Center; New Haven, CT |
| February 18, 2027; TBA | | Wagner | | | | | | Bogota Savings Bank Center; Hackensack, NJ |
| February 20, 2027; TBA | | at LIU | | | | | | Steinberg Wellness Center; Brooklyn, NY |
| February 25, 2027; TBA | | Mercyhurst | | | | | | Bogota Savings Bank Center; Hackensack, NJ |
| February 28, 2027; TBA | | Le Moyne | | | | | | Bogota Savings Bank Center; Hackensack, NJ |
| March 4, 2027; TBA | | at Stonehill | | | | | | Merkert Gymnasium; North Easton, MA |
NEC tournament
| March 8–14, 2027; TBA | | vs. | | | | | | TBD; TBD |
*Non-conference game. ^{#}Rankings from AP Poll. (#) Tournament seedings in parentheses. All times are in Eastern.
