= 2026–27 Stonehill Skyhawks women's basketball team =

American college basketball season

2026–27 Stonehill Skyhawks women's basketball
- Conference: Northeast Conference
- Record: 0–5 (0–0 NEC)
- Head coach: Trisha Brown (26th season)
- Associate head coach: Marcus Reilly
- Assistant coaches: Emily Bramanti; Taniyah Thompson
- Home arena: Merkert Gymnasium

2026–27 NEC women's basketball standings
	Conf.				Overall
Team	W		L	PCT	W		L	PCT
Fairleigh Dickinson	0	–	0	–	3	–	4	.429
Chicago State	0	–	0	–	2	–	4	.333
Central Connecticut	0	–	0	–	2	–	5	.286
Le Moyne	0	–	0	–	1	–	4	.200
New Haven**	0	–	0	–	1	–	4	.200
Wagner	0	–	0	–	1	–	4	.200
Mercyhurst*	0	–	0	–	1	–	5	.167
Stonehill	0	–	0	–	0	–	5	.000
LIU	0	–	0	–	0	–	6	.000
† 2027 NEC tournament winner * ineligible for the 2027 NCAA tournament due to transition from Division II ** ineligible for both the 2027 NEC tournament and the 2027 NCAA tournament due to transition from Division II; As of November 22, 2026

The 2026–27 Stonehill Skyhawks women's basketball team currently represents Stonehill College during the 2026–27 NCAA Division I women's basketball season. The Skyhawks, led by 26th-year head coach Trisha Brown, play their home games at Merkert Gymnasium in Easton, Massachusetts, and compete as a member of the Northeast Conference (NEC).

== Previous season ==
The Skyhawks finished the 2025–26 season 12–18 overall and 8–10 in NEC play, to finish in a tie for sixth place in the conference with Chicago State. As the No. 6 seed in the NEC tournament, they lost 64–70 in the quarterfinals to No. 2 Mercyhurst.

This was the Skyhawks' first season as an official full member of Division I, completing their three-year transition period on July 1, 2025.

== Offseason ==
=== Departures ===
Stonehill departures
Name	Number	Pos.	Height	Year	Hometown	Reason for departure
Molly Lynch	4	Guard	5'8"	Graduate student	Sea Girt, NJ	Graduated
Paige Martin	31	Forward	6'0"	Senior	Hastings-on-Hudson, NY	Graduated
Amaya Dowdy	35	Center	6'0"	Graduate student	Woonsocket, RI	Graduated

=== Incoming transfers ===
There were no incoming transfers for the 2026–27 season.

=== Recruiting class ===
There was no 2026 recruiting class.

== Roster ==
2026–27 Stonehill Skyhawks women's basketball team
Players
Coaches

Pos.	#	Name	Height	Year	Previous school	Hometown
G	1	Shira Elkis	5 ft 6 in (1.68 m)	Jr	Hoff HaSharon	Givat Haim Ichud, Israel
G	2	Sydney McLaughlin	5 ft 11 in (1.8 m)	Jr	Hanover High School	Hanover, NH
G	3	Brooke Paquette	5 ft 8 in (1.73 m)	Sr	Bishop Guertin High School	Hudson, NH
G	4	Mollie Mullen	5 ft 9 in (1.75 m)	Fr	Bishop Feehan High School	Dighton, MA
G	5	Rissi Smith	5 ft 7 in (1.7 m)	So	The Rivers School	Attleboro, MA
G	10	Ella Peletier	6 ft 0 in (1.83 m)	So	Oxford Hills High School	South Paris, ME
G	12	Breana Delaney	5 ft 9 in (1.75 m)	Sr	St. John Vianney High School	Marlboro, NJ
C	13	Bella Mallory	6 ft 2 in (1.88 m)	Sr	E. O. Smith High School	Mansfield Center, CT
F	15	Emma Arcà	6 ft 1 in (1.85 m)	Sr	St. Andrew's School	Rome, Italy
C	21	Reese Roggenburk	6 ft 2 in (1.88 m)	So	Magnificat High School	Cleveland, OH
F/C	22	Megan Sias	6 ft 1 in (1.85 m)	Jr	Toms River High School North	Toms River, NJ
G	25	Phoena Dadson	5 ft 10 in (1.78 m)	Jr	Kent School	Winneba, Ghana
G/F	30	Catelyn Wheeler	5 ft 10 in (1.78 m)	Sr	Bishop Guertin High School	Tyngsborough, MA
F	32	Julia Webster	6 ft 0 in (1.83 m)	Jr	Bishop Feehan High School	Cumberland, RI
G/F	33	Skyler Walker	5 ft 11 in (1.8 m)	Fr	Williston Northampton School	Barrington, RI
F	34	Caitlin Boyle	6 ft 2 in (1.88 m)	Fr	Bishop Fenwick High School	Beverly, MA

Head coach

- Trisha Brown (Harvard)

Assistant coach(es)

- Marcus Reilly (Trinity (CT))
- Emily Bramanti (Stonehill)
- Taniyah Thompson (Georgia)

Legend

- (C) Team captain
- (S) Suspended
- (I) Ineligible
- (W) Walk-on
- Injured
- Current redshirt

Roster
Last update: August 23, 2026

== Schedule and results ==
Date time, TV	Rank^{#}	Opponent^{#}	Result	Record	High points	High rebounds	High assists	Site (attendance) city, state
Non-conference regular season
November 3, 2026*; 7:00 p.m., ESPN+		at Providence	L 65–79	0–1	21 – Paquette	12 – Roggenburk	8 – Pelletier	Alumni Hall (781); Providence, RI
November 6, 2026*; 7:00 p.m., ACCNX		at No. 13 Notre Dame	L 40–123	0–2	6 – Webster	5 – Tied	2 – Tied	Purcell Pavilion (4,274); South Bend, IN
November 8, 2026*; 3:00 p.m., ESPN+		at DePaul	L 63–95	0–3	13 – Tied	7 – Roggenburk	5 – Tied	Wintrust Arena (1,071); Chicago, IL
November 13, 2026*; 6:00 p.m., NEC Front Row		West Georgia	L 63–65	0–4	14 – Tied	11 – Roggenburk	5 – Roggenburk	Merkert Gymnasium (119); Easton, MA
November 18, 2026*; 5:00 p.m., NESN+		Boston University	L 54–57	0–5	15 – Pelletier	6 – Tied	3 – Webster	Merkert Gymnasium (109); Easton, MA
November 22, 2026*; 2:00 p.m., NEC Front Row		Illinois State						Merkert Gymnasium; Easton, MA
November 24, 2026*; 6:00 p.m., ESPN+		Bryant						Chace Athletic Center; Smithfield, RI
November 29, 2026*; 2:00 p.m., ESPN+		Albany						Broadview Center; Albany, NY
December 5, 2026*; 4:00 p.m., NEC Front Row		UMass Lowell						Merkert Gymnasium; Easton, MA
December 11, 2026*; 6:00 p.m., NESN+		Framingham State						Merkert Gymnasium; Easton, MA
December 15, 2026*; 12:00 p.m., SECN+		LSU						Pete Maravich Assembly Center; Baton Rouge, LA
December 19, 2026*; 1:00 p.m., ESPN+		at Tulane; Tulane Holiday Tournament						Devlin Fieldhouse; New Orleans, LA
December 20, 2026*; TBA, ESPN+		vs. TBD; Tulane Holiday Tournament						Devlin Fieldhouse; New Orleans, LA
December 28, 2026*; 4:00 p.m., ESPN+		at New Hampshire						Lundholm Gym; Durham, NH
NEC regular season
January 2, 2027; 2:00 p.m., NEC Front Row		at Wagner						Spiro Sports Center; Staten Island, NY
January 7, 2027; 6:00 p.m., NEC Front Row		Mercyhurst						Merkert Gymnasium; Easton, MA
January 9, 2027; 2:00 p.m., NEC Front Row		Le Moyne						Merkert Gymnasium; Easton, MA
January 16, 2027; 2:00 p.m., NEC Front Row		LIU						Merkert Gymnasium; Easton, MA
January 21, 2027; 7:00 p.m., NEC Front Row		at Central Connecticut						Detrick Gymnasium; New Britain, CT
January 23, 2027; 2:00 p.m., NEC Front Row		Chicago State						Merkert Gymnasium; Easton, MA
January 28, 2027; 6:00 p.m., NEC Front Row		at New Haven						The Hazell Center; West Haven, CT
January 30, 2027; 2:00 p.m., NEC Front Row		at Fairleigh Dickinson						Bogota Savings Bank Center; Hackensack, NJ
February 4, 2027; 6:00 p.m., NEC Front Row		Wagner						Merkert Gymnasium; Easton, MA
February 6, 2027; 2:00 p.m., NEC Front Row		Central Connecticut						Merkert Gymnasium; Easton, MA
February 11, 2027; 6:00 p.m., NEC Front Row		at Mercyhurst						Owen McCormick Court; Erie, PA
February 13, 2027; 1:00 p.m., NEC Front Row		at Le Moyne						Ted Grant Court; Syracuse, NY
February 18, 2027; 7:00 p.m., NEC Front Row		at LIU						Steinberg Wellness Center; Brooklyn, NY
February 24, 2027; 6:00 p.m., NESN+		New Haven						Merkert Gymnasium; Easton, MA
February 27, 2027; 2:00 p.m., NEC Front Row		at Chicago State						Jones Convocation Center; Chicago, IL
March 4, 2027; 6:00 p.m., NEC Front Row		Fairleigh Dickinson						Merkert Gymnasium; Easton, MA
NEC tournament
March 8–14, 2027; TBA		vs.						TBD; TBD
*Non-conference game. ^{#}Rankings from AP Poll. (#) Tournament seedings in parentheses. All times are in Eastern.
