= 2026–27 Mercyhurst Lakers women's basketball team =

American college basketball season

2026–27 Mercyhurst Lakers women's basketball
- Conference: Northeast Conference
- Record: 1–2 (0–0 NEC)
- Head coach: Erin Mills-Reid (2nd season)
- Assistant coaches: Kelly Simmons; Amber Renz
- Home arena: Owen McCormick Court

2026–27 NEC women's basketball standings
	Conf.				Overall
Team	W		L	PCT	W		L	PCT
New Haven**	0	–	0	–	1	–	0	1.000
Mercyhurst*	0	–	0	–	1	–	1	.500
Chicago State	0	–	0	–	1	–	2	.333
Wagner	0	–	0	–	1	–	2	.333
Central Connecticut	0	–	0	–	0	–	2	.000
Fairleigh Dickinson	0	–	0	–	0	–	2	.000
Le Moyne	0	–	0	–	0	–	2	.000
Stonehill	0	–	0	–	0	–	2	.000
LIU	0	–	0	–	0	–	3	.000
† 2027 NEC tournament winner * ineligible for the 2027 NCAA tournament due to transition from Division II ** ineligible for both the 2027 NEC tournament and the 2027 NCAA tournament due to transition from Division II; As of November 9, 2026

The 2026–27 Mercyhurst Lakers women's basketball team currently represents Mercyhurst University during the 2026–27 NCAA Division I women's basketball season. The Lakers, led by second-year head coach Erin Mills-Reid, play their home games on Owen McCormick Court located in the Mercyhurst Athletic Center in Erie, Pennsylvania, and compete as a member of the Northeast Conference (NEC).

This season will mark Mercyhurst's third year of a four-year transition period from Division II to Division I. As a result, the Lakers are not eligible to participate in the NCAA tournament until the 2028–29 season.

== Previous season ==
The Lakers finished the 2025–26 season 15–17 overall and 14–4 in NEC play, to finish in a tie for second in the conference with LIU. As the No. 2 seed in their first ever NEC tournament participation, they eliminated No. 7 Stonehill 70–64 in the quarterfinals to win their first ever Division I playoff game. They then lost to No. 3 LIU in the semifinals.

As a No. 2 seed that did not receive a bid to the WBIT, the Lakers participated in their first Division I postseason when they accepted an automatic bid to the WNIT. However, they would only get to play one game as they fell to Binghamton in the first round.

== Offseason ==
=== Departures ===
Mercyhurst departures
Name	Number	Pos.	Height	Year	Hometown	Reason for Departure
Sophia Kelly	0	Guard	5'9"	Junior	Pittsburgh, PA	Transferred to Wilmington (D-II)
Jenna Van Schaik	5	Guard	5'7"	Senior	Cincinnati, OH	Graduated
Imani Frazier	6	Forward	5'11"	Freshman	Huber Heights, OH	Transferred to Fairmont State (D-II)
Emma Sollenne	12	Guard	5'8"	Freshman	Greenwich, CT	Transferred to Mercy (D-II)
Gabby Sweeney	13	Guard/Forward	6'1"	(redshirt) Freshman	East Fishkill, NY	Transferred to Rider
Lauryn Stover	23	Forward	5'11"	Senior	Gates Mills, OH	Graduated
Quinn Borroni	24	Guard	5'9"	(redshirt) Sophomore	Beaver Falls, PA	Graduated

=== Incoming transfers ===
Mercyhurst incoming transfers
Name	Number	Pos.	Height	Year	Hometown	Previous School
Maya Aguilar	6	Guard	5'9"	Senior	Minot, ND	Minot State (D-II)
Lauren Filien	14	Forward	6'1"	(redshirt) Senior	Rensselaer, NY	Stony Brook (Note: Did not play in the 2025–26 season.)
Layke Fields	22	Forward	6'0"	Sophomore	Farrell, PA	Robert Morris
Carmaya Bowman	23	Forward	5'11"	Senior	Hampstead, MD	Jacksonville

=== Recruiting class ===
There was no recruiting class for 2026.

== Roster ==
2026–27 Mercyhurst Lakers women's basketball team
Players
Coaches

Pos.	#	Name	Height	Year	Previous school	Hometown
G	2	Lena Walz	5 ft 10 in (1.78 m)	Jr	Cathedral Preparatory School; St. Bonaventure	Erie, PA
G	3	Julia Lewis	5 ft 8 in (1.73 m)	So	Cherry Hill High School West	Cherry Hill, NJ
G	4	Shannon Heine	5 ft 8 in (1.73 m)	So	Manasquan High School	Spring Lake Heights, NJ
F	5	Layke Fields	6 ft 0 in (1.83 m)	So	Kennedy Catholic High School; Robert Morris	Farrell, PA
F	7	Lauren Filien	6 ft 1 in (1.85 m)	RS Sr	The Winchendon School; Stony Brook	Rensselaer, NY
G	8	Maya Aguilar	5 ft 9 in (1.75 m)	Sr	Minot High School; Minot State	Minot, ND
G	10	Cici Hernandez	5 ft 6 in (1.68 m)	Jr	Bethlehem Catholic High School	Bethlehem, PA
G	11	Alena Fusetti	5 ft 9 in (1.75 m)	Jr	Blackhawk High School	Beaver Falls, PA
G	20	Sofia Wilson	5 ft 7 in (1.7 m)	So	Magnificat High School	Avon Lake, OH
G	22	Niera Stevens	5 ft 6 in (1.68 m)	Fr	Archbishop Hoban High School	Akron, OH
F	23	Carmaya Bowman	5 ft 11 in (1.8 m)	Sr	Manchester Valley High School; Jacksonville	Hampstead, MD
G	24	Natalie Spano	5 ft 6 in (1.68 m)	Fr	Cathedral Preparatory School	Erie, PA
G	25	Brooke Missry	5 ft 10 in (1.78 m)	Fr	St. Rose High School	Manasquan, NJ
F	32	Erica Hall	5 ft 11 in (1.8 m)	Jr	South Fayette High School	McDonald, PA
G	33	Ella Cupka	5 ft 9 in (1.75 m)	RS So	Chartiers Valley High School	Pittsburgh, PA

Head coach

- Erin Mills-Reid (Fairleigh Dickinson)

Assistant coach(es)

- Kelly Simmons (Trinity)
- Amber Renz (Mercyhurst)

Legend

- (C) Team captain
- (S) Suspended
- (I) Ineligible
- (W) Walk-on
- Injured
- Current redshirt

Roster
Last update: August 23, 2026

== Schedule and results ==
Date time, TV	Rank^{#}	Opponent^{#}	Result	Record	High points	High rebounds	High assists	Site (attendance) city, state
Exhibition
October 25, 2026*; 12:00 p.m.		at Xavier	L 64–85		–	–	–	Cintas Center; Cincinnati, OH
Non-conference regular season
November 3, 2026*; 7:00 p.m., ESPN+		at Seton Hall	L 37–63	0–1	9 – Filien	9 – Hernandez	2 – Tied	Walsh Gymnasium (514); South Orange, NJ
November 5, 2026*; 6:00 p.m., NEC Front Row		Penn State Beaver	W 94–46	1–1	18 – Walz	7 – Tied	8 – Wilson	Owen McCormick Court (457); Erie, PA
November 8, 2026*; 1:00 p.m., B1G+		at No. 18 Ohio State	L 57–91	1–2	16 – Wilson	5 – Aguilar	5 – Wilson	Schottenstein Center (4,726); Columbus, OH
November 11, 2026*; 4:30 p.m., ESPN+		at St. Bonaventure						Reilly Center; St. Bonaventure, NY
November 14, 2026*; 5:00 p.m., NEC Front Row		Akron						Owen McCormick Court; Erie, PA
November 18, 2026*; 6:00 p.m., ESPN+		at Cornell						Newman Arena; Ithaca, NY
November 21, 2026*; 5:00 p.m., NEC Front Row		Siena						Owen McCormick Court; Erie, PA
November 25, 2026*; 1:00 p.m., NEC Front Row		Canisius						Owen McCormick Court; Erie, PA
November 29, 2026*; 1:00 p.m., NEC Front Row		Thiel						Owen McCormick Court; Erie, PA
December 2, 2026*; 6:00 p.m., ESPN+		at Colgate						Cotterell Court; Hamilton, NY
December 6, 2026*; 1:00 p.m., NEC Front Row		Niagara						Owen McCormick Court; Erie, PA
December 11, 2026*; 7:00 p.m.		at Cleveland State						Wolstein Center; Cleveland, OH
December 15, 2026*; TBA		at Minnesota						The Barn; Minneapolis, MN
December 17, 2026*; TBA		at Pittsburgh						Petersen Events Center; Pittsburgh, PA
December 20, 2026*; TBA		at Robert Morris						UPMC Events Center; Moon Township, PA
December 29, 2026*; TBA		Allegheny						Owen McCormick Court; Erie, PA
NEC regular season
January 2, 2027; TBA		at Le Moyne						Ted Grant Court; Syracuse, NY
January 7, 2027; TBA		at Stonehill						Merkert Gymnasium; North Easton, MA
January 9, 2027; TBA		at Central Connecticut						Detrick Gymnasium; New Britain, CT
January 14, 2027; TBA		Wagner						Owen McCormick Court; Erie, PA
January 16, 2027; TBA		Fairleigh Dickinson						Owen McCormick Court; Erie, PA
January 21, 2027; TBA		LIU						Owen McCormick Court; Erie, PA
January 23, 2027; TBA		New Haven						Owen McCormick Court; Erie, PA
January 30, 2027; TBA		at Chicago State						Jones Convocation Center; Chicago, IL
February 4, 2027; TBA		at LIU						Steinberg Wellness Center; Brooklyn, NY
February 11, 2027; TBA		Stonehill						Owen McCormick Court; Erie, PA
February 13, 2027; TBA		Central Connecticut						Owen McCormick Court; Erie, PA
February 17, 2027; TBA		Chicago State						Owen McCormick Court; Erie, PA
February 20, 2027; TBA		New Haven						The Hazell Center; West Haven, CT
February 25, 2027; TBA		at Fairleigh Dickinson						Bogota Savings Bank Center; Hackensack, NJ
February 27, 2027; TBA		at Wagner						Spiro Sports Center; Staten Island, NY
March 4, 2027; TBA		Le Moyne						Owen McCormick Court; Erie, PA
NEC tournament
March 8–14, 2027; TBA		vs.						TBD; TBD
*Non-conference game. ^{#}Rankings from AP Poll. (#) Tournament seedings in parentheses. All times are in Eastern.
