= 2026–27 St. Bonaventure Bonnies women's basketball team =

American college basketball season

2026–27 St. Bonaventure Bonnies women's basketball
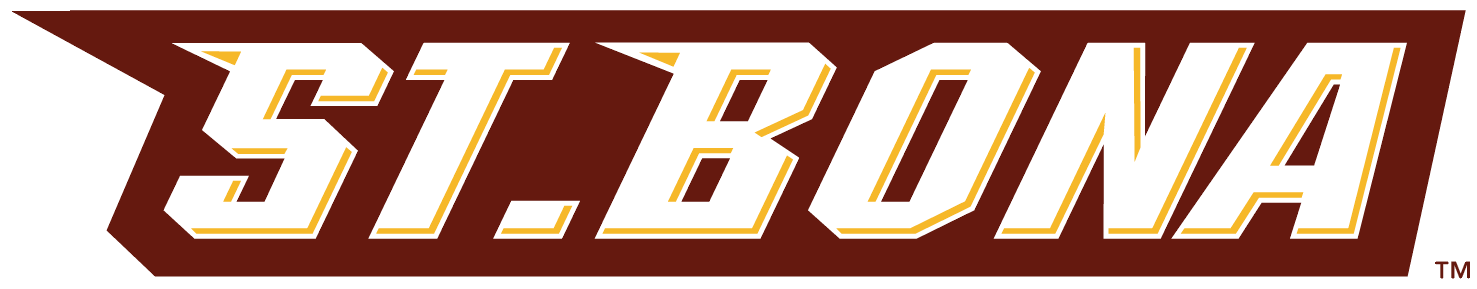
- Conference: Atlantic 10 Conference
- Record: 0–0 (0–0 A-10)
- Head coach: Jim Crowley (4th season, 20th overall season)
- Associate head coach: Kelcie Rombach
- Assistant coaches: Jim Brunelli; Kaserra Owens; Marion Dietz; Aaliyah Parker
- Home arena: Reilly Center

2026–27 Atlantic 10 women's basketball standings
	Conf.				Overall
Team	W		L	PCT	W		L	PCT
Davidson	0	–	0	–	0	–	0	–
Dayton	0	–	0	–	0	–	0	–
Duquesne	0	–	0	–	0	–	0	–
Fordham	0	–	0	–	0	–	0	–
George Mason	0	–	0	–	0	–	0	–
George Washington	0	–	0	–	0	–	0	–
La Salle	0	–	0	–	0	–	0	–
Loyola Chicago	0	–	0	–	0	–	0	–
Rhode Island	0	–	0	–	0	–	0	–
Richmond	0	–	0	–	0	–	0	–
Saint Joseph's	0	–	0	–	0	–	0	–
St. Bonaventure	0	–	0	–	0	–	0	–
Saint Louis	0	–	0	–	0	–	0	–
VCU	0	–	0	–	0	–	0	–
† 2027 A10 tournament winner

The 2026–27 St. Bonaventure Bonnies women's basketball team will represent St. Bonaventure University during the 2026–27 NCAA Division I women's basketball season. The Bonnies, led by head coach Jim Crowley in the fourth season of his second stint as head coach, and 20th season overall, will play their home games at the Reilly Center in St. Bonaventure, New York, and compete as a member of the Atlantic 10 Conference (A-10).

== Previous season ==
The Bonnies finished the 2025–26 season 17–16 overall and 7–11 in A-10 play, finishing in a tie for ninth in the conference with George Washington. As the No. 9 seed in the A-10 tournament, they lost 59–61 to No. 8 seed Loyola Chicago in the second round.

Following the tournament, the Bonnies earned and accepted an at-large bid to the WNIT, their first appearance since 2014 and fifth overall. In the first round, they defeated Drexel 69–67 in overtime, advancing to the second round where they lost 50–69 to Middle Tennessee to end their season.

The 2025–26 season was the first winning season for the program in ten years, when the 2015–26 NCAA tournament team went 24–8.

== Offseason ==
=== Departures ===
St. Bonaventure departures
Name	Num.	Pos.	Height	Year	Hometown	Reason for departure
Aaliyah Parker	5	Guard	5'9"	Graduate Student	Cheektowaga, NY	Graduated
Mya Davidson	10	Forward	6'2"	(redshirt) Junior	Rockford, IL	Graduated
Gabby Robinson	14	Forward	6'2"	Senior	Brampton, Ontario	Graduated
Brianna Barr-Buday	23	Forward	6'2"	Freshman	Grand Island, NY	Transferred to Cleveland State (Note: Sat out the 2025–26 season, not listed on team roster.)
Laycee Drake	24	Guard	5'6"	Graduate Student	Hancock, NY	Graduated

=== Incoming transfers ===
St. Bonaventure incoming transfers
Name	Num.	Pos.	Height	Year	Hometown	Previous school
Jordyn Williams	3	Forward	5'11"	Junior	Buffalo, NY	Niagara
Kyla Hayes	24	Forward	6'0"	Sophomore	Buffalo, NY	St. John's
Kay Donahue	50	Guard	5'10"	Graduate Student	Belle Mead, NJ	Lafayette

=== Recruiting class ===
There was no 2026 recruiting class.

== Preseason ==
On October 19, 2026, the Atlantic 10 Conference released its annual preseason poll and honor awards. St. Bonaventure was picked to finish eleventh in the conference.

=== Preseason rankings ===
Atlantic 10 Preseason Poll
Place	Team	Votes
1	Saint Joseph's	196 (14)
2	Davidson	181
3	George Washington	141
4	George Mason	138
5	Dayton	127
6	Saint Louis	123
7	VCU	106
8	Richmond	101
9	Rhode Island	97
10	La Salle	78
11	St. Bonaventure	59
12	Duquesne	51
13	Fordham	40
14	Loyola Chicago	32
(#) first-place votes

=== Preseason All-Conference Teams ===
No players were named to the Preseason All-Conference First, Second or Third Team.

=== Preseason All-Conference Defensive Team ===
No players were named to the Preseason All-Conference Defensive Team.

== Roster ==
2026–27 St. Bonaventure Bonnies women's basketball team
Players
Coaches

Pos.	#	Name	Height	Year	Previous school	Hometown
G	1	Mackenzie Pettinelli	5 ft 10 in (1.78 m)	Jr	Spring-Ford High School	Collegeville, PA
G	2	Kaylee Krysztof	5 ft 9 in (1.75 m)	Sr	Depew High School; Binghamton	Buffalo, NY
F	3	Jordyn Williams	5 ft 11 in (1.8 m)	Jr	Cardinal O'Hara High School; Niagara	Buffalo, NY
G	6	Lola Gralton	6 ft 0 in (1.83 m)	Fr	St. Scholastica's College	Sydney, Australia
G	11	Diamond Fields	5 ft 9 in (1.75 m)	So	Monsignor Scanlan High School	Bronx, NY
G	12	Ivona Djikanovic	6 ft 0 in (1.83 m)	So	AZ Compass Prep	Belgrade, Serbia
G	14	Mallory Heise	5 ft 7 in (1.7 m)	So	Hilton High School	Hilton, NY
F	15	Kylie Buckley	6 ft 0 in (1.83 m)	Sr	Livonia High School; Oakland	Livonia, NY
G/F	20	Ella Trinkaus	6 ft 1 in (1.85 m)	Fr	Notre Dame High School	Marcy, NY
G	22	Olivia DiFranco	5 ft 10 in (1.78 m)	Jr	Eastern Michigan	Elyria, OH
F	24	Kyla Hayes	6 ft 0 in (1.83 m)	So	Cardinal O'Hara High School; St. John's	Buffalo, NY
G	30	Elyse MacDonough	5 ft 8 in (1.73 m)	So	Worcester Academy	South Burlington, VT
F	33	Iva Corluka	6 ft 1 in (1.85 m)	So	Ardsley High School	Ardsley, NY
F	44	Brillana Boyd	5 ft 10 in (1.78 m)	Jr	Redondo Union High School; Long Beach City College	Redondo Beach, CA
G	50	Kay Donahue	5 ft 10 in (1.78 m)	GS	Montgomery High School; Lafayette	Belle Mead, NJ

Head coach

- Jim Crowley (Keuka)

Assistant coach(es)

- Kelcie Rombach (St. Bonaventure)
- Jim Brunelli (Clarion)
- Kaserra Owens (Pitt–Bradford)
- Marion Dietz (SUNY New Paltz)
- Aaliyah Parker (St. Bonaventure)

Legend

- (C) Team captain
- (S) Suspended
- (I) Ineligible
- (W) Walk-on
- Injured
- Current redshirt

Roster
Last update: October 28, 2026

== Schedule and results ==
Date time, TV	Rank^{#}	Opponent^{#}	Result	Record	High points	High rebounds	High assists	Site (attendance) city, state
Exhibition
October 28, 2026*; 6:00 p.m.		at Robert Morris	L 67–72		20 – Hayes	10 – Trinkaus	4 – Tied	UPMC Events Center (150); Moon Township, PA
October 31, 2026*; 1:00 p.m.		Roberts Wesleyan						Reilly Center; St. Bonaventure, NY
Regular season
November 4, 2026*; 6:00 p.m., ESPN+		D'Youville						Reilly Center; St. Bonaventure, NY
November 11, 2026*; 4:30 p.m., ESPN+		Mercyhurst						Reilly Center; St. Bonaventure, NY
November 14, 2026*; 1:30 p.m., ESPN+		Binghamton						Reilly Center; St. Bonaventure, NY
November 19, 2026*; 6:00 p.m., ESPN+		at Buffalo						Broadview Arena; Buffalo, NY
November 23, 2026*; 12:00 p.m.		vs. Chattanooga; Georgia State Thanksgiving Tournament						GSU Convocation Center; Atlanta, GA
November 24, 2026*; 12:00 p.m., ESPN+		at Georgia State; Georgia State Thanksgiving Tournament						GSU Convocation Center; Atlanta, GA
November 29, 2026*; 1:00 p.m., ESPN+		at Canisius						Koessler Athletic Center; Buffalo, NY
December 2, 2026; 6:00 p.m., ESPN+		Saint Louis						Reilly Center; St. Bonaventure, NY
December 5, 2026*; 5:00 p.m.		at Marist						McCann Arena; Poughkeepsie, NY
December 8, 2026*; 11:00 a.m., ESPN+		at Cornell						Newman Arena; Ithaca, NY
December 11, 2026*; 6:00 p.m., ESPN+		Howard						Reilly Center; St. Bonaventure, NY
December 19, 2026*; 2:00 p.m., ESPN+		at Albany						Broadview Center; Albany, NY
December 21, 2026*; 1:00 p.m., ESPN+		Le Moyne						Reilly Center; St. Bonaventure, NY
December 30, 2026; 6:00 p.m., ESPN+		at VCU						Siegel Center; Richmond, VA
January 2, 2027; 6:00 p.m., YES/ESPN+		at Richmond						Reilly Center; St. Bonaventure, NY
January 6, 2027; 6:00 p.m., ESPN+		at George Washington						Charles E. Smith Center; Washington, D.C.
January 9, 2027; 3:00 p.m., ESPN+		at George Mason						EagleBank Arena; Fairfax, VA
January 13, 2027; 6:00 p.m., YES/ESPN+		Rhode Island						Reilly Center; St. Bonaventure, NY
January 16, 2027; 2:00 p.m., ESPN+		at La Salle						John Glaser Arena; Philadelphia, PA
January 20, 2027; 6:00 p.m., ESPN+		Loyola Chicago						Reilly Center; St. Bonaventure, NY
January 24, 2027; 11:00 a.m., CBSSN		at Duquesne						UPMC Cooper Fieldhouse; Pittsburgh, PA
January 27, 2027; 6:00 p.m., ESPN+		Saint Joseph's						Reilly Center; St. Bonaventure, NY
January 30, 2027; 1:00 p.m., YES/ESPN+		Fordham						Reilly Center; St. Bonaventure, NY
February 6, 2027; 2:00 p.m., ESPN+		at Richmond						Robins Center; Richmond, VA
February 10, 2027; 7:00 p.m., ESPN+		at Saint Joseph's						Hagan Arena; Philadelphia, VA
February 14, 2027; 1:00 p.m., ESPN+		Dayton						Reilly Center; St. Bonaventure, NY
February 17, 2027; 7:00 p.m., ESPN+		at Davidson						John M. Belk Arena; Davidson, NC
February 20, 2027; 1:00 p.m., YES/ESPN+		VCU						Reilly Center; St. Bonaventure, NY
February 24, 2027; 6:00 p.m., YES/ESPN+		Duquesne						Reilly Center; St. Bonaventure, NY
February 27, 2027; 3:00 p.m., ESPN+		at Fordham						Rose Hill Gymnasium; Bronx, NY
A-10 tournament
March 3–7, 2027; TBA		vs.						Henrico Sports & Events Center; Henrico, VA
*Non-conference game. ^{#}Rankings from AP Poll. (#) Tournament seedings in parentheses. All times are in Eastern.
