= Neptune, New Jersey =

Neptune, New Jersey may refer to:

- Neptune Township, New Jersey
- Neptune City, New Jersey
