= Land Art Generator Initiative =

Land Art Generator Initiative (LAGI), founded by Elizabeth Monoian and Robert Ferry, is an organization dedicated to devising alternative energy solutions through sustainable design and public art by providing platforms for scientists and engineers to collaborate with artists, architects and other creatives on public art projects that generate sustainable energy infrastructures. Since 2010, LAGI has hosted biennial international competitions stimulating artists to design public art that produces renewable energy. Sites for these contests have included Abu Dhabi, United Arab Emirates, Copenhagen, Denmark, New York City and Santa Monica, California. Land Art Generator Initiative also led efforts that have resulted in the world's first Solar Mural artwork.

== LAGI International Design Competitions ==
Every two years since 2010, Land Art Generator Initiative has conducted international competitions leading design teams from over forty countries to create art-based solutions to renewable energy challenges.

2010 - Adu Dhabi, United Arab Emirates

2012 - Freshkills Park, New York

2014 - Copenhagen, Denmark

2016 - Santa Monica, California

2018 - Melbourne, Australia

2019 - Abu Dubai, United Arab Emirates

2020 - Fly Ranch, Nevada

2022 - Mannheim, Germany

== Solar Mural Artworks ==
The world's first Solar Mural artworks, developed through leadership from the Land Art Generator Initiative, are located in San Antonio, Texas. These artworks are the result of an advanced photovoltaic film technology that allows light to filter through an image-printed film adhered to solar panels. The first is a stand-alone work called La Monarca. The world's first wall-mounted Solar Mural artwork is on the facade of Brackenridge Elementary School.
