= Hamden Hall Country Day School =

Private school in Hamden, Connecticut, US

Location
- 1108 Whitney Avenue; Hamden, Connecticut 06517; United States; 41°20′31″N 72°54′47″W

Information
- Type: Independent Day School
- Established: 1912 (114 years ago)
- CEEB code: 070258
- Head of school: Robert J. Izzo
- Board President: Joyce Lujic
- Faculty: 85 full-time
- Grades: PreSchool through Grade 12
- Gender: Co-educational (since 1927)
- Enrollment: 700 students
- Campus: 12 + 30 acres (120,000 m^{2})
- Colors: Green and white
- Mascot: "Ernie the Hornet"
- Rival: Hopkins School
- Tuition: $26,300 - 55,100 (USD)
- Website: www.hamdenhall.org

Hamden Hall Country Day School is a coeducational private day school in Hamden, Connecticut, educating students from preschool to grade 12. Hamden Hall was founded in 1912 as a country day school for boys by John P. Cushing, its first headmaster. It was the nation’s fourth country day school. The school has been coeducational since 1927 and expanded to include classes through grade 12 in 1934. Now split into three separate divisions, Hamden Hall enrolls the majority of its nearly 700 students in the middle and upper schools (Grades 6–12) and the remainder in the lower school (preschool through grade 5).

Tuition (2026–2027 school year) ranges from $26,300 in preschool to $55,100 in grades 9–12. Hamden Hall awards need-based financial aid to approximately 30 percent of its student body.

Hamden Hall is accredited by the New England Association of Schools and Colleges and is a member of National Association of Independent Schools and the Connecticut Association of Independent Schools.

== School ==
The school year, from early September to early June, is divided into two semesters, with Thanksgiving, winter, and spring recesses and observances of several national and religious holidays.

In middle and upper school, most classes are held four days a week with one (two on Fridays) of the six class periods being dropped every day. In addition, each class meets for one extended period every week, with there being two extended periods on Wednesdays. Extra-help sessions are also incorporated into the schedule.

=== The Lower School (Preschool through Grade 6) ===
The World Language Program begins in preschool with instruction in Chinese (Mandarin, Simplified) and continues through grade 1. Spanish is taught in grades 2 through 4, followed by Latin in grades 5 and 6. An extended-day program provides after-school enrichment for students with later pickup times.

=== The Middle School (Grades 6 through 8) ===
English classes emphasize classical authors while providing students with opportunities to produce their own creative and expository essays. Beginning in grade 7, students work regularly with faculty advisors once a week.

=== The Upper School (Grades 9 through 12) ===
The upper school divides its required credits into four types of classes based on academic proficiency required to succeed in the class: Skills (the lowest level), General, Honors, and Advanced Placement. Typically, math, language, and science courses are offered in General, Honors, and AP levels. Multi-Variable Calculus, Linear Algebra, Organic Chemistry, and Advanced Chinese and Latin are offered at a level beyond the AP curriculum.

== Faculty ==
- 85 full and part-time teachers
- Three quarters of the faculty hold advanced degrees
- Student / faculty ratio: 6 to 1
- Average class size: 12

== Campus ==
Hamden Hall's main campus is located on 12 acres (49,000 m^{2}) in Hamden, Connecticut, overlooking Lake Whitney. Hamden Hall was founded in 1912 by Dr. John P. Cushing and was housed in the hilltop mansion built by music merchant Morris Steinert. The mansion eventually exceeded its practical use and was taken down. The current campus consists of 8 major buildings.

== Sports ==
Hamden Hall Hornets Logo

Most Hamden Hall athletic teams compete under the umbrella of the New England Preparatory School Athletic Council, with some competing in specific leagues such as the Fairchester League.

Hamden Hall maintains two off-campus athletic facilities: a small, soccer-sized field directly adjacent to the main campus, and the 30-acre (120,000 m^{2}) Skiff Street Athletic Complex 1.5 miles (2.4 km) from campus. The latter contains fields and facilities for football, baseball, softball, soccer, lacrosse, field hockey, tennis, and cross country. The Hadelman Family Multipurpose Stadium, featuring a synthetic field, was dedicated in 2012. Also at this complex exists the Beckerman Athletic Center, dedicated in 2010. It is a US$12.5 million, 65,000-square-foot (6,000 m^{2}) state-of-the art athletic building featuring 3 collegiate-length basketball courts (one wood, two composite), a 6 lane by 25-yard swimming pool, a large fitness center, conference rooms, and more. It has seating for up to 800 spectators.

== Notable alumni ==
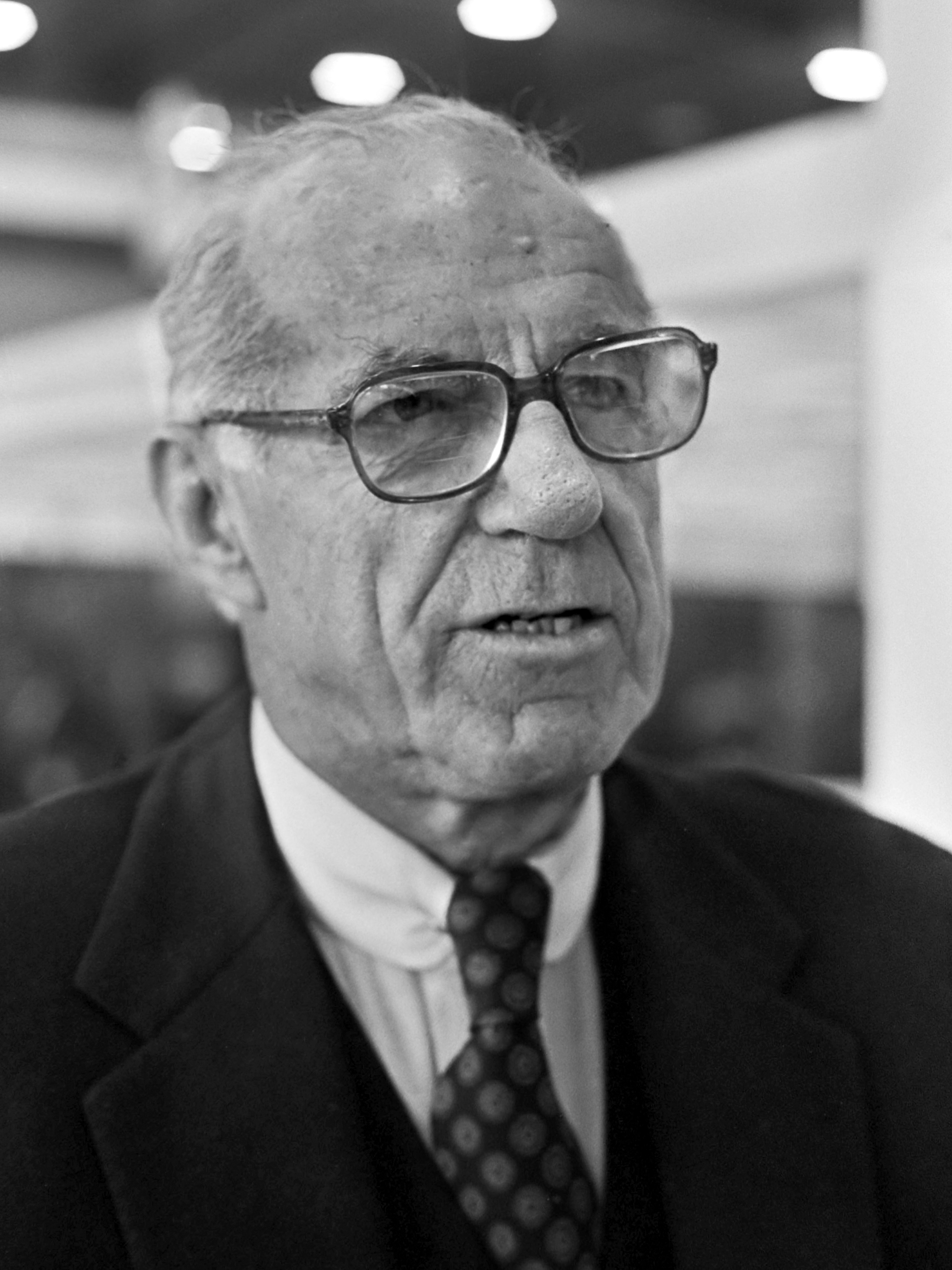
Benjamin Spock

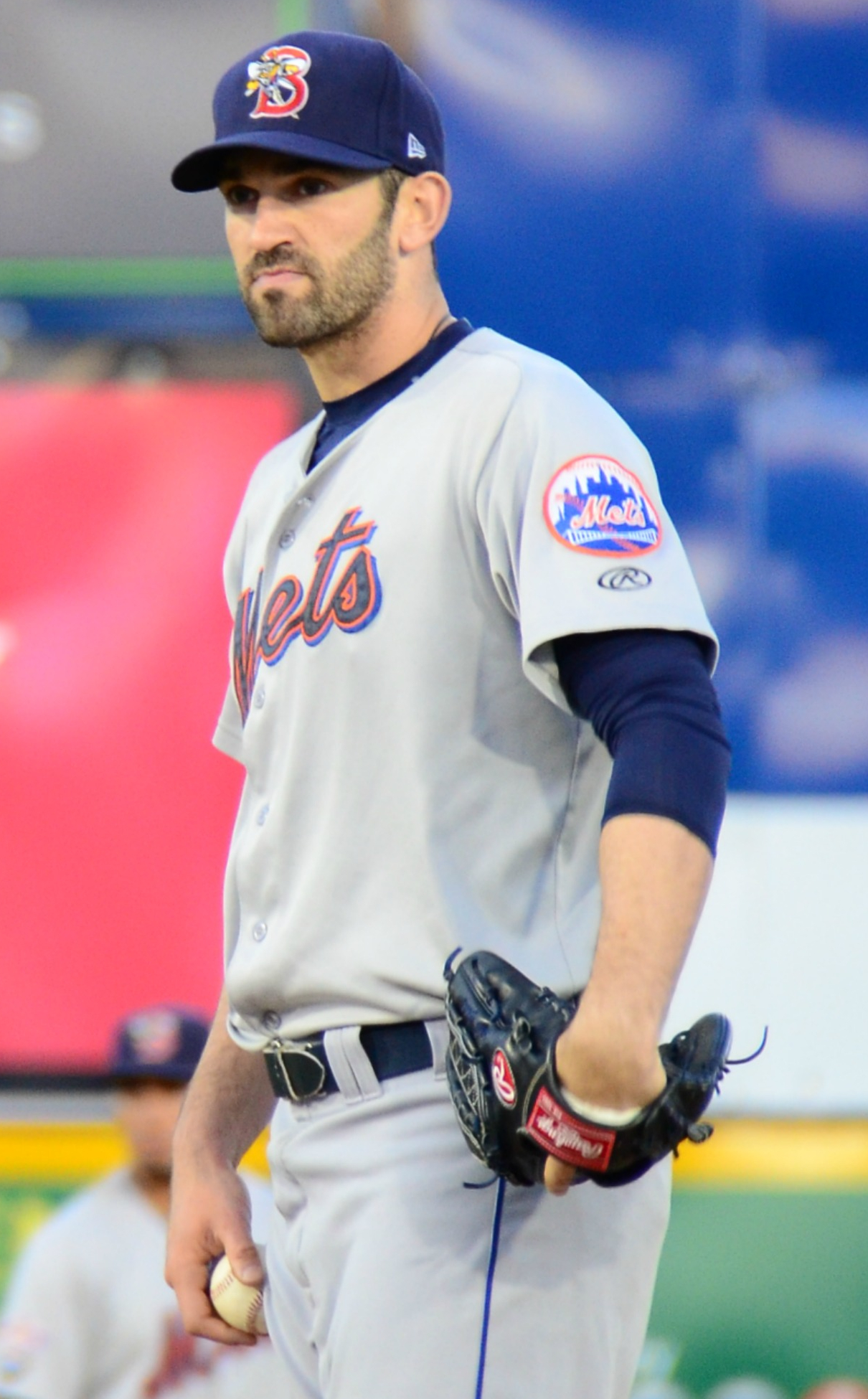
Josh Zeid

- Michael Barbaro, reporter and host of The Daily (podcast)
- Hiram Bingham IV (1903–1988), American diplomat and WWII hero
- Jonathan Brewster Bingham (1914–1986), Congressman and diplomat; US delegate to the United Nations General Assemblies
- Chris Bruno, actor, USA Network series The Dead Zone and the movie The World's Fastest Indian
- Dylan Bruno, actor, CBS series Numb3rs and movie Saving Private Ryan
- Ross Douthat (born 1979), New York Times columnist and author
- Len Fasano (born 1958), politician
- Mitch Feierstein, British-American investor, banker and writer
- Gary Greenberg, lead co-writer of Jimmy Kimmel Live
- Jake Hurwitz, comedian and member of the comedy duo Jake and Amir
- Ben James (born 2003), professional golfer
- Samantha Katz (born 1985), designer and arts entrepreneur
- Bun Lai, chef and owner of Miya's Sushi and a national leader in the sustainability movement
- Jay Lender, writer and director of the animated TV series SpongeBob SquarePants
- Richard Wall Lyman, educator and president of Stanford University from 1970 to 1980
- Jill Medvedow, director of the Institute of Contemporary Art, Boston
- Carlos Parra (born 1977), soccer player
- Benjamin Spock, doctor and author of the child-rearing guide "Baby and Child Care" and esteemed pediatrician
- Josh Zeid (born 1987), Major League Baseball pitcher (Houston Astros)
- Luke Schoonmaker (2018) Professional Football player for the Dallas Cowboys
