= 2026–27 UNC Wilmington Seahawks women's basketball team =

American college basketball season

2026–27 UNC Wilmington Seahawks women's basketball
- Conference: Coastal Athletic Association
- Record: 1–0 (0–0 CAA)
- Head coach: Nicole Woods (4th season)
- Associate head coach: Cherie Lea
- Assistant coach: Jama Sharp
- Home arena: Trask Coliseum

2026–27 CAA women's basketball standings
	Conf.				Overall
Team	W		L	PCT	W		L	PCT
Stony Brook	0	–	0	–	4	–	0	1.000
Monmouth	0	–	0	–	4	–	1	.800
UNC Wilmington	0	–	0	–	3	–	1	.750
Towson	0	–	0	–	3	–	2	.600
Charleston	0	–	0	–	2	–	2	.500
Elon	0	–	0	–	2	–	2	.500
Hofstra	0	–	0	–	2	–	2	.500
Northeastern	0	–	0	–	2	–	2	.500
William & Mary	0	–	0	–	2	–	2	.500
North Carolina A&T	0	–	0	–	2	–	3	.400
Drexel	0	–	0	–	1	–	3	.250
Hampton	0	–	0	–	1	–	4	.200
Campbell	0	–	0	–	1	–	5	.167
† 2027 CAA tournament winner As of November 19, 2026

The 2026–27 UNC Wilmington Seahawks women's basketball team currently represents the University of North Carolina Wilmington during the 2026–27 NCAA Division I women's basketball season. The Seahawks, led by fourth-year head coach Nicole Woods, play their home games at Trask Coliseum in Wilmington, North Carolina, and compete as a member of the Coastal Athletic Association.

== Previous season ==
The Seahawks finished the 2025–26 season 7–24 overall and 2–16 in CAA play, to finish last in the conference for the fifth time in six seasons. As the No. 13 seed in the CAA tournament, they defeated No. 12 Northeastern 51–50 in the first round, winning their first tournament game since 2022. They advanced to the second round, where they lost to No. 5 seed Monmouth 61–72 to end their season.

In February 2026, junior guard Paige Smith was arrested on felony drug charges involving marijuana. She was subsequently placed on suspension by the program and did not play with the team for the rest of the season. She later entered the transfer portal in April.

== Offseason ==
=== Departures ===
UNC Wilmington departures
Name	Num	Pos.	Height	Year	Hometown	Reason for departure
Mary Ferrito	1	Guard	5'10"	Senior	Plain City, OH	Graduated
Paige Smith	2	Guard	5'7"	Junior	Hagerstown, MD	Suspended from team, entered transfer portal
Kate Hollifield	3	Guard	5'10"	Senior	Shelby, NC	Graduated, transferred to Western Carolina
Tia Dobson	4	Guard	5'7"	Sophomore	Daytona Beach, FL	Transferred to George Mason
Rori Cox	5	Guard	5'7"	Graduate student	Brooklyn, NY	Graduated
McCall King	10	Guard	5'10"	Senior	Easley, SC	Graduated
Torin Rogers	11	Forward	6'1"	(redshirt) Junior	Brasstown, NC	Transferred to Appalachian State
Corrie McLaughlin	13	Forward	6'2"	Junior	Raleigh, NC	Graduated, transferred to Georgetown
Kylah Silver	14	Guard	5'10"	(redshirt) Sophomore	Greenville, NC	Graduated, transferred to Providence
Icyss Storm	23	Forward	6'1"	Freshman	Durham, NC	Transferred to North Carolina A&T
Angelina Pelayo	24	Center	6'3"	(redshirt) Freshman	Louisville, KY	Transferred to Wofford
Staci Williams	33	Guard	5'8"	Junior	Holly Springs, NC	Walk-on (Note: Transferred to UNC Wilmington from Fairleigh Dickinson following 2024–25 season as a student only. Joined in February 2026 for last five games of the season.)

=== Incoming transfers ===
UNC Wilmington incoming transfers
Name	Num	Pos.	Height	Year	Hometown	Previous school
Leah Keyes	3	Guard	5'10"	Sophomore	Stafford, VA	George Mason
Kimmie Hicks	5	Guard	5'10"	Senior	Annapolis, MD	Loyola Maryland
Loghan Johnson	7	Guard	5'10"	Senior	Houston, TX	West Virginia
Naylee Cortes	9	Forward	5'10"	Graduate student	Bogotá, Colombia	Charleston
Bella Toomey	11	Forward	6'2"	Senior	Philadelphia, PA	Fairleigh Dickinson
Sienna Dauer	13	Guard/Forward	5'11"	Junior	Bradenton, FL	Davidson

=== Recruiting class ===
There was no 2026 recruiting class.

== Preseason ==
On October 15, 2026, the CAA released its annual preseason coaches poll and awards. UNC Wilmington was picked to finish last in the conference.

=== Preseason rankings ===
CAA Preseason Coaches Poll
Place	Team	Votes
1	Monmouth	144 (12)
2	Elon	116
3	Drexel	109
4	William & Mary	108 (1)
5	Towson	99
6	North Carolina A&T	89
7	Stony Brook	88
8	Charleston	71
9	Hofstra	56
10	Hampton	51
11	Northeastern	35
12	Campbell	30
13	UNC Wilmington	18
(#) first-place votes

=== Preseason All-CAA Teams ===
No players were named to the Preseason All-CAA First or Second Team.

=== CAA Preseason Honorable Mentions ===
No players were named CAA Preseason Honorable Mentions.

== Roster ==
2026–27 UNC Wilmington Seahawks women's basketball team
Players
Coaches

Pos.	#	Name	Height	Year	Previous school	Hometown
G	0	Ebbony Wilson	5 ft 10 in (1.78 m)	So	St. Mary's Academy	Los Angeles, CA
G	2	Promise Njoku	5 ft 8 in (1.73 m)	Fr	Mount Zion Prep	Washington, D.C.
G	3	Leah Keyes	5 ft 10 in (1.78 m)	So	Virginia Academy; George Mason	Stafford, VA
G	4	Alva Hägerström	5 ft 6 in (1.68 m)	Fr		Ängelholm, Sweden
G	5	Kimmie Hicks	5 ft 10 in (1.78 m)	Sr	Saint Frances Academy; Loyola Maryland	Annapolis, MD
G	7	Loghan Johnson	5 ft 10 in (1.78 m)	Sr	Houston Christian High School; West Virginia	Houston, TX
F	9	Naylee Cortes	5 ft 10 in (1.78 m)	GS	Central Pointe Christian Academy; West Virginia	Bogotá, Colombia
F	11	Bella Toomey	6 ft 2 in (1.88 m)	Sr	William Penn Charter School; Fairleigh Dickinson	Philadelphia, PA
G/F	13	Sienna Dauer	5 ft 11 in (1.8 m)	Jr	IMG Academy; Davidson	Bradenton, FL
C	22	Morgan White	6 ft 4 in (1.93 m)	Fr	Dorman High School	Moore, SC
G	24	Jazlyn Bowman	5 ft 11 in (1.8 m)	Fr	Windermere Prep	Orlando, FL
G	30	Tiara Thompson	5 ft 7 in (1.7 m)	Fr	West Rowan High School	Glen Burnie, MD

Head coach

- Nicole Woods (Belmont Abbey)

Assistant coach(es)

- Cherie Lea (UNC Wilmington)
- Jama Sharp (Stetson)

Legend

- (C) Team captain
- (S) Suspended
- (I) Ineligible
- (W) Walk-on
- Injured
- Current redshirt

Roster
Last update: July 23, 2026

== Schedule and results ==
Date time, TV	Rank^{#}	Opponent^{#}	Result	Record	High points	High rebounds	High assists	Site (attendance) city, state
Exhibition
October 24, 2026*; 3:00 p.m.		at No. 25 NC State	L 40–75		8 – Hicks	5 – Toomey	2 – Tied	Reynolds Coliseum (1,200); Raleigh, NC
Non-conference regular season
November 3, 2026*; 6:00 p.m., FloCollege		Barton	W 75–44	1–0	14 – Tied	11 – Johnson	3 – Njoku	Trask Coliseum (771); Wilmington, NC
November 7, 2026*; 12:00 p.m., FloCollege		North Carolina Central	W 87–48	2–0	18 – Johnson	7 – Johnson	4 – Tied	Trask Coliseum (730); Wilmington, NC
November 12, 2026*; 11:30 a.m., ACCNX		at Wake Forest	L 48–65	2–1	16 – Thompson	6 – Johnson	2 – Hicks	LJVM Coliseum; Winston-Salem, NC
November 16, 2026*; 11:00 a.m., ESPN+		at Presbyterian	W 61–35	3–1	19 – Dauer	11 – Johnson	5 – Thompson	Templeton Physical Education Center (477); Clinton, SC
November 22, 2026*; 1:00 p.m., FloCollege		East Carolina						Trask Coliseum; Wilmington, NC
November 29, 2026*; 1:00 p.m., FloCollege		Mount Olive						Trask Coliseum; Wilmington, NC
December 3, 2026*; 11:00 a.m., FloCollege		Bowling Green						Trask Coliseum; Wilmington, NC
December 6, 2026*; 1:00 p.m., ESPN+		at Coastal Carolina						HTC Center; Conway, SC
December 13, 2026*; 2:00 p.m., ESPN+		at Queens						Curry Arena; Charlotte, NC
December 22, 2026*; 1:00 p.m., FloCollege		Gardner–Webb						Trask Coliseum; Wilmington, NC
December 28, 2026*; 8:00 p.m., ACCN		at North Carolina						Carmichael Arena; Chapel Hill, NC
CAA regular season
January 1, 2027; 6:00 p.m., FloCollege		Monmouth						Trask Coliseum; Wilmington, NC
January 3, 2027; 1:00 p.m., FloCollege		North Carolina A&T						Trask Coliseum; Wilmington, NC
January 8, 2027; 6:00 p.m., FloCollege		at Hofstra						Mack Sports Complex; Hempstead, NY
January 15, 2027; 6:00 p.m., FloCollege		Northeastern						Trask Coliseum; Wilmington, NC
January 17, 2027; 1:00 p.m., FloCollege		William & Mary						Trask Coliseum; Wilmington, NC
January 22, 2027; 7:00 p.m., FloCollege		at Hampton						Hampton Convocation Center; Hampton, VA
January 24, 2027; 1:00 p.m., FloCollege		Campbell						Trask Coliseum; Wilmington, NC
January 29, 2027; 6:00 p.m., FloCollege		at Charleston						TD Arena; Charleston, SC
January 31, 2027; 2:00 p.m., FloCollege		at North Carolina A&T						Corbett Sports Center; Greensboro, NC
February 5, 2027; 6:00 p.m., FloCollege		Towson						Trask Coliseum; Wilmington, NC
February 7, 2027; 1:00 p.m., FloCollege		Stony Brook						Trask Coliseum; Wilmington, NC
February 12, 2027; 6:00 p.m., FloCollege		at Drexel						Daskalakis Athletic Center; Philadelphia, PA
February 14, 2027; 1:00 p.m., FloCollege		at Northeastern						Cabot Center; Boston, MA
February 16, 2027; 6:00 p.m., FloCollege		Hampton						Trask Coliseum; Wilmington, NC
February 21, 2027; 1:00 p.m., FloCollege		at Elon						Schar Center; Elon, NC
February 26, 2027; 7:00 p.m., FloCollege		at William & Mary						Kaplan Arena; Williamsburg, VA
February 28, 2027; 1:00 p.m., FloCollege		Charleston						Trask Coliseum; Wilmington, NC
March 6, 2027; 2:00 p.m., FloCollege		at Campbell						Gore Arena; Buies Creek, NC
CAA tournament
March 10–14, 2027; TBA, FloCollege		vs.						CareFirst Arena; Washington, D.C.
*Non-conference game. ^{#}Rankings from AP Poll. (#) Tournament seedings in parentheses. All times are in Eastern.
