= 2026–27 Elon Phoenix women's basketball team =

American college basketball season

2026–27 Elon Phoenix women's basketball
- Conference: Coastal Athletic Association
- Record: 3–2 (0–0 CAA)
- Head coach: Charlotte Smith (16th season)
- Assistant coaches: Edgar Farmer Jr.; Kelvin Long Jr.; Shelbie Davenport; Shay Burnett
- Home arena: Schar Center

2026–27 CAA women's basketball standings
	Conf.				Overall
Team	W		L	PCT	W		L	PCT
Stony Brook	0	–	0	–	4	–	0	1.000
Monmouth	0	–	0	–	4	–	1	.800
UNC Wilmington	0	–	0	–	3	–	1	.750
Charleston	0	–	0	–	3	–	2	.600
Elon	0	–	0	–	3	–	2	.600
William & Mary	0	–	0	–	3	–	2	.600
Towson	0	–	0	–	3	–	3	.500
Hofstra	0	–	0	–	2	–	2	.500
Northeastern	0	–	0	–	2	–	2	.500
Drexel	0	–	0	–	2	–	3	.400
North Carolina A&T	0	–	0	–	2	–	3	.400
Hampton	0	–	0	–	1	–	4	.200
Campbell	0	–	0	–	1	–	5	.167
† 2027 CAA tournament winner As of November 21, 2026

The 2026–27 Elon Phoenix women's basketball team currently represents Elon University during the 2026–27 NCAA Division I women's basketball season. The Phoenix, led by sixteenth-year head coach Charlotte Smith, play their home games at the Schar Center in Elon, North Carolina, and compete as a member of the Coastal Athletic Association.

== Previous season ==
The Phoenix finished the 2025–26 season 16–16 overall and 10–8 in CAA play, finishing in a tie for sixth in the conference with Towson. As the No. 6 seed in the CAA tournament, they defeated No. 11 Hampton 67–62 in the second round before falling to No. 3 seed Drexel 53–68 in the quarterfinals to end their season.

== Offseason ==
=== Departures ===
Elon departures
Name	Num	Pos.	Height	Year	Hometown	Reason for departure
Maraja Pass	4	Guard	5'4"	Junior	Shelby, NC	Transferred to North Carolina A&T
Quinzia Filmore	7	Forward	6'3"	Senior	Greensboro, NC	Graduated; signed with the UpShot League's Charlotte Crown
Ruby Willard	11	Guard	5'10"	Senior	Bozeman, MT	Graduated
Laila Anderson	12	Guard	5'7"	Senior	Burlington, NC	Graduated
Aly Wadkovsky	33	Center	6'2"	Senior	Denver, NC	Graduated, transferred to IUP (D-II) (Note: Did not play in the 2025–26 season due to injury.)

=== Incoming transfers ===
There were no incoming transfers for the 2026–27 season.

=== Recruiting class ===
There was no recruiting class for 2026.

== Preseason ==
On October 15, 2026, the CAA released its annual preseason coaches poll and awards. Elon was picked to finish second in the conference.

=== Preseason rankings ===
CAA Preseason Coaches Poll
Place	Team	Votes
1	Monmouth	144 (12)
2	Elon	116
3	Drexel	109
4	William & Mary	108 (1)
5	Towson	99
6	North Carolina A&T	89
7	Stony Brook	88
8	Charleston	71
9	Hofstra	56
10	Hampton	51
11	Northeastern	35
12	Campbell	30
13	UNC Wilmington	18
(#) first-place votes

=== Preseason All-CAA Teams ===
Preseason All-CAA Teams
Player	Year	Position	Team
Jayda Angel	(redshirt) Sophomore	Guard	Second
La'Nae Corbett	Junior	Forward	Second

=== CAA Preseason Honorable Mentions ===
No players were named CAA Preseason Honorable Mentions.

== Roster ==
2026–27 Elon Phoenix women's basketball team
Players
Coaches

Pos.	#	Name	Height	Year	Previous school	Hometown
G	1	Ashanti Fox	5 ft 7 in (1.7 m)	So	Union Pines High School	Vass, NC
F	5	LaNae' Corbett	6 ft 0 in (1.83 m)	Jr	Bishop McNamara High School; Hofstra	Upper Marlboro, MD
G	7	Sidney Smith	5 ft 4 in (1.63 m)	Fr	Roselle Park High School	Roselle Park, NJ
G	8	Jayda Angel	5 ft 8 in (1.73 m)	RS So	Cape Fear High School	Fayetteville, NC
G	10	Kamryn Doty (5th)	5 ft 5 in (1.65 m)	RS Sr	AZ Compass Prep	Tucson, AZ
G	12	Skylar Bolden	6 ft 0 in (1.83 m)	Fr	St. Elizabeth High School	New Castle, DE
G	15	Kierra Morrow	5 ft 10 in (1.78 m)	Jr	Cannon School	Charlotte, NC
F	19	Norah Fuld	6 ft 3 in (1.91 m)	Fr	Western Reserve Academy	Westport, CT
F	21	Savannah Whitley	6 ft 0 in (1.83 m)	Fr	St. Vincent Pallotti High School	Laurel, MD
G	22	Tyana Walker	5 ft 10 in (1.78 m)	RS Sr	DME Academy; Howard	Leawood, KS
F/C	24	Tamia Watkins	6 ft 2 in (1.88 m)	So	Andrew Jackson High School	Kershaw, SC
G	25	Samira Khalil	5 ft 9 in (1.75 m)	Jr	Hammond School	Lexington, SC
G	30	Ashlee Shaw	5 ft 7 in (1.7 m)	Jr	West Cabarrus High School	Concord, NC
F	33	Macayla Askew	6 ft 0 in (1.83 m)	Fr	Derby High School	Derby, KS

Head coach

- Charlotte Smith (North Carolina)

Assistant coach(es)

- Edgar Farmer Jr. (North Carolina)
- Kelvin Long Jr. (Tennessee)
- Shelbie Davenport (Chattanooga)
- Shay Burnett (Elon)

Legend

- (C) Team captain
- (S) Suspended
- (I) Ineligible
- (W) Walk-on
- (5th) Fifth-year senior
- Injured
- Current redshirt

Roster
Last update: July 22, 2026

== Schedule and results ==
Date time, TV	Rank^{#}	Opponent^{#}	Result	Record	High points	High rebounds	High assists	Site (attendance) city, state
Non-conference regular season
November 2, 2026*; 7:00 p.m., FloCollege		UNC Pembroke	W 84–50	1–0	25 – Corbett	8 – Morrow	4 – Khalil	Schar Center (438); Elon, NC
November 6, 2026*; 7:00 p.m., MEAC Network		at Howard	L 69–76	1–1	21 – Corbett	9 – Corbett	6 – Fox	Burr Gymnasium (1,197); Washington, D.C.
November 11, 2026*; 7:00 p.m., FloCollege		East Tennessee State	L 60–65 ^{OT}	1–2	18 – Corbett	5 – Tied	3 – Tied	Schar Center (454); Elon, NC
November 15, 2026*; 3:00 p.m., ACCNX		at Wake Forest	W 67–58	2–2	21 – Fox	9 – Watkins	3 – Fox	LJVM Coliseum (1,037); Winston-Salem, NC
November 19, 2026*; 11:00 a.m., FloCollege		Liberty	W 66–56	3–2	26 – Corbett	6 – Watkins	4 – Fox	Schar Center (2,653); Elon, NC
November 23, 2026*; 5:00 p.m., MEAC Network		at North Carolina Central						McDougald–McLendon Arena; Durham, NC
November 29, 2026*; 2:00 p.m., ACCN		at Clemson						Littlejohn Coliseum; Clemson, SC
December 2, 2026*; 7:00 p.m., FloCollege		Appalachian State						Schar Center; Elon, NC
December 6, 2026*; 2:00 p.m., ACCN		at North Carolina						Carmichael Arena; Chapel Hill, NC
December 13, 2026*; 2:00 p.m., MEAC Network		at Norfolk State						Echols Hall; Norfolk, VA
December 16, 2026*; 6:00 p.m., ESPN+		at Presbyterian						Templeton Physical Education Center; Clinton, SC
December 20, 2026*; 1:00 p.m., FloCollege		UNC Greensboro						Schar Center; Elon, NC
December 29, 2026*; 2:00 p.m., FloCollege		North Carolina Wesleyan						Schar Center; Elon, NC
CAA regular season
January 1, 2027; 1:00 p.m., FloCollege		at Drexel						Daskalakis Athletic Center; Philadelphia, PA
January 3, 2027; 1:00 p.m., FloCollege		at Towson						SECU Arena; Towson, MD
January 8, 2027; 7:00 p.m., FloCollege		William & Mary						Schar Center; Elon, NC
January 10, 2027; 1:00 p.m., FloCollege		Stony Brook						Schar Center; Elon, NC
January 17, 2027; 1:00 p.m., FloCollege		North Carolina A&T						Schar Center; Elon, NC
January 22, 2027; 6:00 p.m., FloCollege		at Campbell						Gore Arena; Buies Creek, NC
January 24, 2027; 1:00 p.m., FloCollege		at William & Mary						Kaplan Arena; Williamsburg, VA
January 29, 2027; 7:00 p.m., FloCollege		Hampton						Schar Center; Elon, NC
January 31, 2027; 1:00 p.m., FloCollege		Charleston						Schar Center; Elon, NC
February 5, 2027; 6:00 p.m., FloCollege		at Monmouth						OceanFirst Bank Center; West Long Branch, NJ
February 7, 2027; 1:00 p.m., FloCollege		at Northeastern						Cabot Center; Boston, MA
February 14, 2027; 1:00 p.m., FloCollege		Hofstra						Schar Center; Elon, NC
February 19, 2027; 7:00 p.m., FloCollege		Drexel						Schar Center; Elon, NC
February 21, 2027; 1:00 p.m., FloCollege		UNC Wilmington						Schar Center; Elon, NC
February 26, 2027; 7:00 p.m., FloCollege		at North Carolina A&T						Corbett Sports Center; Greensboro, NC
February 28, 2027; 2:00 p.m., FloCollege		at Hampton						Hampton Convocation Center; Hampton, VA
March 4, 2027; 7:00 p.m., FloCollege		Campbell						Schar Center; Elon, NC
March 6, 2027; 1:00 p.m., FloCollege		at Charleston						TD Arena; Charleston, SC
CAA tournament
March 10–14, 2027; TBA, FloCollege		vs.						CareFirst Arena; Washington, D.C.
*Non-conference game. ^{#}Rankings from AP Poll. (#) Tournament seedings in parentheses. All times are in Eastern.
