= 2026–27 Hampton Lady Pirates basketball team =

American college basketball season

2026–27 Hampton Lady Pirates basketball
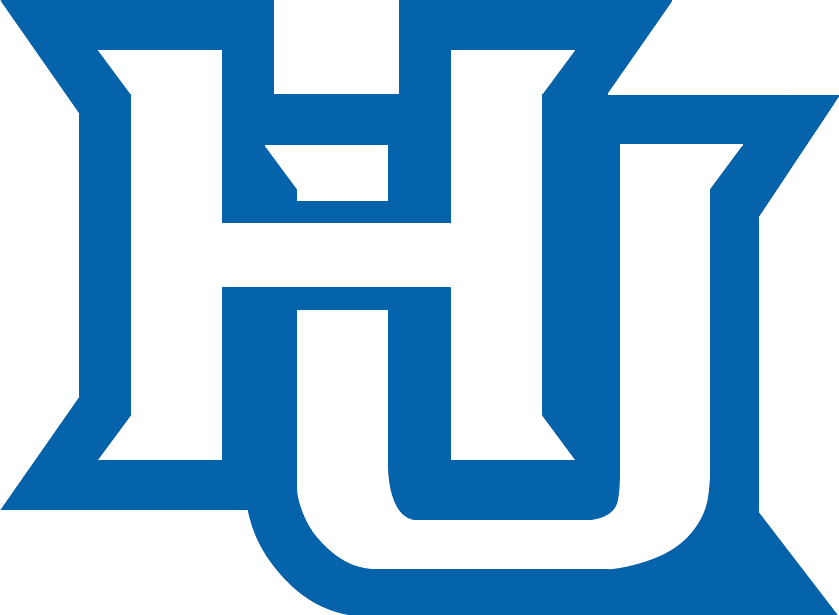
- Conference: Coastal Athletic Association
- Record: 1–2 (0–0 CAA)
- Head coach: Tamisha Augustin (3rd season)
- Associate head coach: Gail Striegler
- Assistant coaches: Brooke Moore; Josh Cooperwood; Nate Reid; Kenya Mattox
- Home arena: Hampton Convocation Center

2026–27 CAA women's basketball standings
	Conf.				Overall
Team	W		L	PCT	W		L	PCT
Stony Brook	0	–	0	–	3	–	0	1.000
UNC Wilmington	0	–	0	–	2	–	0	1.000
Charleston	0	–	0	–	2	–	1	.667
Hofstra	0	–	0	–	2	–	1	.667
Monmouth	0	–	0	–	2	–	1	.667
Northeastern	0	–	0	–	2	–	1	.667
William & Mary	0	–	0	–	2	–	1	.667
Drexel	0	–	0	–	1	–	2	.333
Elon	0	–	0	–	1	–	2	.333
Hampton	0	–	0	–	1	–	2	.333
North Carolina A&T	0	–	0	–	1	–	2	.333
Towson	0	–	0	–	1	–	2	.333
Campbell	0	–	0	–	0	–	4	.000
† 2027 CAA tournament winner As of November 13, 2026

The 2026–27 Hampton Lady Pirates basketball team currently represents Hampton University during the 2025–26 NCAA Division I women's basketball season. The Lady Pirates, led by third-year head coach Tamisha Augustin, play their home games at the Hampton Convocation Center in Hampton, Virginia, and compete as a member of the Coastal Athletic Association.

== Previous season ==
The Lady Pirates finished the 2025–26 season 10–21 overall and 4–14 in CAA play, finishing in eleventh in the conference. As the No. 11 seed in the CAA tournament, they earned a bye to the second round, losing 62–67 to No. 6 Elon to end their season.

== Offseason ==
=== Departures ===
Hampton departures
Name	Num.	Pos.	Height	Year	Hometown	Reason for Departure
Le'Asia Foreman	1	Forward	5'8"	Senior	Norfolk, VA	Graduated
Olivia Smith	3	Guard	5'5"	Senior	Fort Wayne, IN	Graduated; returned as student assistant coach
Diamond Wiggins	5	Guard	5'10"	Junior	Norfolk, VA	Entered transfer portal
Tyra Kennedy	10	Guard	5'7"	Junior	Tampa, FL	Graduated, entered transfer portal
Taylor Gibson	20	Forward	6'2"	Senior	Upper Marlboro, MD	Graduated
Kiya Dorroh	23	Forward	6'1"	Senior	Tucson, AZ	Graduated
Aisha Dabo	24	Forward	6'2"	Graduate Student	Queens, NY	Transferred to Drexel
Tiani Abrams	25	Forward	6'1"	Senior	Vista, CA	Graduated
Akilah Shelton	34	Forward	6'2"	Freshman	Columbus, GA	Transferred to Bethune–Cookman

=== Incoming transfers ===
Hampton incoming transfers
Name	Num.	Pos.	Height	Year	Hometown	Previous School
Eghosa Obasuyi	2	Guard	5'4"	Senior	Villa Rica, GA	Georgia State
Maya Woodson	11	Forward	6'2"	Senior	Columbia, MD	Morgan State
Justus Fitzgerald	22	Forward	6'2"	Sophomore	Roswell, GA	Syracuse
Zoey Rixter	23	Guard	6'0"	Sophomore	Memphis, TN	Southeast Missouri State
Amiyah Donaldson	24	Guard	5'7"	Graduate Student	Cleveland, OH	Maine
Kennedy Hall	31	Forward	6'3"	Freshman	Indian Head, MD	Boston College

=== Recruiting class ===
There was no 2026 recruiting class.

== Preseason ==
On October 15, 2026, the CAA released its annual preseason coaches poll and awards. Hampton was picked to finish tenth in the conference.

=== Preseason rankings ===
CAA Preseason Coaches Poll
Place	Team	Votes
1	Monmouth	144 (12)
2	Elon	116
3	Drexel	109
4	William & Mary	108 (1)
5	Towson	99
6	North Carolina A&T	89
7	Stony Brook	88
8	Charleston	71
9	Hofstra	56
10	Hampton	51
11	Northeastern	35
12	Campbell	30
13	UNC Wilmington	18
(#) first-place votes

=== Preseason All-CAA Teams ===
Preseason All-CAA Teams
Player	Year	Position	Team
Kayla Lezama	(redshirt) Senior	Guard	Second

=== CAA Preseason Honorable Mentions ===
CAA Preseason Honorable Mentions
Player	Year	Position
Kiarra McElrath	Senior	Guard

== Roster ==
2026–27 Hampton Lady Pirates women's basketball team
Players
Coaches

Pos.	#	Name	Height	Year	Previous school	Hometown
G	0	Aaryn Battle	5 ft 10 in (1.78 m)	Sr	Camden Catholic High School; Pittsburgh	Sewell, NJ
C	1	Janaye Walker	6 ft 3 in (1.91 m)	So	Baldwin High School	Milledgeville, GA
G	2	Eghosa Obasuyi	5 ft 4 in (1.63 m)	Sr	Carrollton High School; Georgia State	Villa Rica, GA
G	3	Nilah Rivera	5 ft 5 in (1.65 m)	Fr	Newark Arts High School	Newark, NJ
G	4	Arlisha Boston	5 ft 11 in (1.8 m)	Sr	King's Fork High School	Suffolk, VA
G	5	Kiki McElrath	5 ft 7 in (1.7 m)	Sr	Delaware State	Columbus, OH
G	10	Jeniyah Bowers	5 ft 8 in (1.73 m)	Fr	Columbus Africentric Early College	Columbus, OH
F	11	Maya Woodson	6 ft 2 in (1.88 m)	Sr	Hammond High School; Morgan State	Columbia, MD
G	14	Kayla Lezama	6 ft 0 in (1.83 m)	RS Sr	Noble & Greenough School; Boston College	Boston, MA
F	22	Justus Fitzgerald	6 ft 1 in (1.85 m)	So	Roswell High School; Syracuse	Roswell, GA
G	23	Zoey Rixter	6 ft 0 in (1.83 m)	So	Bartlett High School; Southeast Missouri State	Memphis, TN
G	24	Amiyah Donaldson	5 ft 7 in (1.7 m)	GS	Lutheran High School East; Maine	Cleveland, OH
F	31	Kennedy Hall	6 ft 3 in (1.91 m)	Fr	Westtown School; Boston College	Indian Head, MD
F	44	Anja Navcheska	6 ft 0 in (1.83 m)	Fr	Sportska Akademija Skopje	Skopje, North Macedonia

Head coach

- Tamisha Augustin (Alabama A&M)

Assistant coach(es)

- Gail Striegler (Arkansas)
- Brooke Moore (Purdue)
- Josh Cooperwood (Tennessee State)
- Nate Reid (Carroll)
- Keyana Mattox (Virginia State)

Legend

- (C) Team captain
- (S) Suspended
- (I) Ineligible
- (W) Walk-on
- Injured
- Current redshirt

Roster
Last update: August 20, 2026

== Schedule and results ==
Date time, TV	Rank^{#}	Opponent^{#}	Result	Record	High points	High rebounds	High assists	Site (attendance) city, state
Non-conference regular season
November 2, 2026*; 1:00 p.m., ESPN+		at Houston	L 65–73	0–1	33 – McElrath	7 – Hall	5 – Battle	Fertitta Center (809); Houston, TX
November 5, 2026*; 12:00 p.m., ACCNX		at SMU	L 54–66	0–2	19 – Tied	10 – Woodson	4 – Battle	Moody Coliseum (3,356); University Park, TX
November 9, 2026*; 7:00 p.m., FloCollege		The Apprentice School	W 103–43	1–2	17 – Tied	7 – Walker	6 – Donaldson	Hampton Convocation Center (472); Hampton, VA
November 14, 2026*; 6:00 p.m., FloCollege		Norfolk State						Hampton Convocation Center; Hampton, VA
November 16, 2026*; 7:00 p.m., ESPN+		at High Point						Qubein Center; High Point, NC
November 22, 2026*; 2:00 p.m., ESPN+		at Delaware						Bob Carpenter Center; Newark, DE
November 30, 2026*; 5:00 p.m., ESPN+		at Winthrop						Winthrop Coliseum; Rock Hill, SC
December 4, 2026*; 7:00 p.m., MEAC Network		at Howard						Burr Gymnasium; Washington, D.C.
December 14, 2026*; 7:00 p.m., MSN/FloCollege		Saint Francis (PA)						Hampton Convocation Center; Hampton, VA
December 18, 2026*; 1:30 p.m., ESPN+		vs. North Carolina Central; FIU Holiday Classic						Ocean Bank Convocation Center; Miami, FL
December 19, 2026*; 1:30 p.m., ESPN+		vs. Morgan State; FIU Surfing Santa Classic						Ocean Bank Convocation Center; Miami, FL
CAA regular season
January 1, 2027; 2:00 p.m., FloCollege		at North Carolina A&T						Corbett Sports Center; Greensboro, NC
January 3, 2027; 2:00 p.m., FloCollege		at Campbell						Gore Arena; Buies Creek, NC
January 8, 2027; 7:00 p.m., MSN/FloCollege		Charleston						Hampton Convocation Center; Hampton, VA
January 10, 2027; 2:00 p.m., MSN/FloCollege		Northeastern						Hampton Convocation Center; Hampton, VA
January 15, 2027; 7:00 p.m., FloCollege		at William & Mary						Kaplan Arena; Williamsburg, VA
January 17, 2027; 2:00 p.m., FloCollege		at Towson						SECU Arena; Towson, MD
January 22, 2027; 7:00 p.m., MSN/FloCollege		UNC Wilmington						Hampton Convocation Center; Hampton, VA
January 24, 2027; 2:00 p.m., MSN/FloCollege		Hofstra						Hampton Convocation Center; Hampton, VA
January 29, 2027; 7:00 p.m., FloCollege		at Elon						Schar Center; Elon, NC
January 31, 2027; 2:00 p.m., MSN/FloCollege		William & Mary						Hampton Convocation Center; Hampton, VA
February 5, 2027; 7:00 p.m., MSN/FloCollege		North Carolina A&T						Hampton Convocation Center; Hampton, VA
February 12, 2027; 1:00 p.m., FloCollege		at Stony Brook						Stony Brook Arena; Stony Brook, NY
February 14, 2027; 2:00 p.m., FloCollege		at Monmouth						OceanFirst Bank Center; West Long Branch, NJ
February 19, 2027; 6:00 p.m., FloCollege		at UNC Wilmington						Trask Coliseum; Wilmington, NC
February 21, 2027; 2:00 p.m., MSN/FloCollege		Drexel						Hampton Convocation Center; Hampton, VA
February 26, 2027; 7:00 p.m., MSN/FloCollege		Towson						Hampton Convocation Center; Hampton, VA
February 28, 2027; 2:00 p.m., MSN/FloCollege		Elon						Hampton Convocation Center; Hampton, VA
March 4, 2027; 7:00 p.m., FloCollege		at Charleston						TD Arena; Charleston, SC
CAA tournament
March 10–14, 2027; TBA, FloCollege		vs.						CareFirst Arena; Washington, D.C.
*Non-conference game. ^{#}Rankings from AP Poll. (#) Tournament seedings in parentheses. All times are in Eastern.
