= 2026–27 Hofstra Pride women's basketball team =

American college basketball season

2026–27 Hofstra Pride women's basketball
- Conference: Coastal Athletic Association
- Record: 2–1 (0–0 CAA)
- Head coach: Danielle Santos Atkinson (8th season)
- Assistant coaches: Keila Whittington; Amber Reeves; Maniya Custis; Christian Mordi; Jenna Annecchiarico
- Home arena: Mack Sports Complex

2026–27 CAA women's basketball standings
	Conf.				Overall
Team	W		L	PCT	W		L	PCT
Stony Brook	0	–	0	–	3	–	0	1.000
UNC Wilmington	0	–	0	–	2	–	0	1.000
Charleston	0	–	0	–	2	–	1	.667
Hofstra	0	–	0	–	2	–	1	.667
Monmouth	0	–	0	–	2	–	1	.667
Northeastern	0	–	0	–	2	–	1	.667
William & Mary	0	–	0	–	2	–	1	.667
Drexel	0	–	0	–	1	–	2	.333
Elon	0	–	0	–	1	–	2	.333
Hampton	0	–	0	–	1	–	2	.333
North Carolina A&T	0	–	0	–	1	–	2	.333
Towson	0	–	0	–	1	–	2	.333
Campbell	0	–	0	–	0	–	4	.000
† 2027 CAA tournament winner As of November 13, 2026

The 2026–27 Hofstra Pride women's basketball team currently represents Hofstra University during the 2026–27 NCAA Division I women's basketball season. The Pride, led by eighth-year head coach Danielle Santos Atkinson, play their home games at the Mack Sports Complex in Hempstead, New York, and compete as a member of the Coastal Athletic Association.

== Previous season ==
The Pride finished the 2025–26 season 11–22 overall and 6–12 in CAA play, finishing tenth in the conference. As the No. 10 seed in the CAA tournament, they saw an unprecedented tournament run to the title game. They defeated No. 7 Towson in the second round 72–71 with a game-winning 3-pointer by guard Emma Von Essen, then upset No. 2 Campbell with a 55–50 win in regulation in the quarterfinals and No. 3 Drexel 53–49 in overtime in the semifinals, sending them to the championship game for the first time since 2015. They were unable to capture the conference title, as they lost to No. 1 Charleston 56–68 to end their season.

By making it to the CAA championship game as the No. 10 seed, they became the lowest ranked team ever to do so, beating the record previously set by the 2024–25 William & Mary Tribe who made it to and won the conference title game as the No. 9 seed.

== Offseason ==
=== Departures ===
Hofstra departures
Name	Num	Pos.	Height	Year	Hometown	Reason for departure
Sana'a Garnett	0	Guard	5'7"	Junior	Philadelphia, PA	Transferred to Norfolk State
Maddie Pounds	1	Guard	5'8"	Sophomore	Rocky Mount, NC	Transferred to Valdosta State (D-II)
Emma Von Essen	2	Guard	5'9"	Senior	Rockville Centre, NY	Graduated; signed with the UpShot League's Jacksonville Waves
Chloe Sterling	3	Guard	5'7"	Senior	Kennesaw, GA	Graduated
Ayen Angoi	6	Forward	5'11"	Senior	Lavon, TX	Graduated
Deiveijon Harris	7	Center	6'3"	Senior	The Bronx, NY	Graduated
Neveah Brown	8	Guard	5'8"	Graduate student	Charlotte, NC	Graduated
Alarice Gooden	10	Guard	5'7"	Senior	Brampton, Ontario	Graduated
Syniya Barton	11	Guard	5'7"	Freshman	South Hempstead, NY	Transferred to Pace (D-II)
Sandra Magolico	13	Forward	6'1"	Graduate student	Maputo, Mozambique	Graduated
Micaela Carter	25	Guard	5'6"	Junior	Brampton, Ontario	Transferred to Kansas City

=== Incoming transfers ===
Hofstra incoming transfers
Name	Num	Pos.	Height	Year	Hometown	Previous school
Angel Jones	1	Guard	5'5"	Graduate student	Woodbridge, VA	Pittsburgh
Comari Mitchell	2	Guard	5'8"	Junior	Portsmouth, VA	Jacksonville
Kelian Cedano	3	Guard	5'9"	Junior	Putnam, CT	Temple
Paloma Garcia Rosado	8	Guard	5'6"	Senior	Corozal, Puerto Rico	Merrimack
Felicia Jacobs	9	Forward	6'2"	Junior	London, England	Temple
Ceylone Brooks	12	Guard	5'9"	Junior	Upper Arlington, OH	Daytona State (NJCAA)

=== Recruiting class ===
There was no 2026 recruiting class.

== Preseason ==
On October 15, 2026, the CAA released its annual preseason coaches poll and awards. Hofstra was picked to finish ninth in the conference.

=== Preseason rankings ===
CAA Preseason Coaches Poll
Place	Team	Votes
1	Monmouth	144 (12)
2	Elon	116
3	Drexel	109
4	William & Mary	108 (1)
5	Towson	99
6	North Carolina A&T	89
7	Stony Brook	88
8	Charleston	71
9	Hofstra	56
10	Hampton	51
11	Northeastern	35
12	Campbell	30
13	UNC Wilmington	18
(#) first-place votes

=== Preseason All-CAA Teams ===
No players were named to the Preseason All-CAA First or Second Team.

=== CAA Preseason Honorable Mentions ===
No players were named CAA Preseason Honorable Mentions.

== Roster ==
2026–27 Hofstra Pride women's basketball team
Players
Coaches

Pos.	#	Name	Height	Year	Previous school	Hometown
G	1	Angel Jones	5 ft 5 in (1.65 m)	GS	Forest Park High School; Pittsburgh	Woodbridge, VA
G	2	Comari Mitchell	5 ft 8 in (1.73 m)	Jr	Shabach Christian Academy; Jacksonville	Portsmouth, VA
G	3	Kelian Cedano	5 ft 9 in (1.75 m)	Jr	Putnam Science Academy; Temple	Putnam, CT
G/F	5	Ema Karim	5 ft 10 in (1.78 m)	Jr	Amelia Rey Colaço Escola	Paredes, Portugal
G	8	Paloma Garcia Rosado	5 ft 6 in (1.68 m)	Sr	Proctor Academy; Merrimack	Corozal, Puerto Rico
F	9	Felicia Jacobs	6 ft 2 in (1.88 m)	Jr	City of London Academy, Southwark; Temple	London, England
F	10	Audriana Williams	6 ft 0 in (1.83 m)	Fr	Elizabeth Seton High School	Upper Marlboro, MD
F	11	Allie Broadus	6 ft 1 in (1.85 m)	Fr	Thomas Dale High School	Chester, VA
F	12	Adaora Dioramma	6 ft 1 in (1.85 m)	Fr	City of London Academy, Southwark	London, England
G	21	Ceylone Brooks	5 ft 9 in (1.75 m)	Jr	Upper Arlington High School; Daytona State College	Upper Arlington, OH
F	23	Olivia VanPatten	6 ft 1 in (1.85 m)	So	St. George's School	Cranston, RI
G	25	Mone't Edwars	5 ft 7 in (1.7 m)	Fr	Saint Frances Academy	Baltimore, MD
F/C	32	Michaela Hodge	6 ft 3 in (1.91 m)	Jr	Northampton County High School	Jackson, NC
F	35	Kiyanna Blacks-Stewart	6 ft 1 in (1.85 m)	So	Paul VI High School	Sicklerville, NJ

Head coach

- Danielle Santos Atkinson (Florida)

Assistant coach(es)

- Keila Whittington (Dillard)
- Amber Reeves (UNC Wilmington)
- Maniya Custis (Hofstra)
- Christian Mordi (William Patterson)
- Jenna Annecchiarico (College of Charleston)

Legend

- (C) Team captain
- (S) Suspended
- (I) Ineligible
- (W) Walk-on
- Injured
- Current redshirt

Roster
Last update: July 20, 2026

== Schedule and results ==
Date time, TV	Rank^{#}	Opponent^{#}	Result	Record	High points	High rebounds	High assists	Site (attendance) city, state
Non-conference regular season
November 2, 2026*; 10:30 a.m., ACCNX		at Georgia Tech	L 65–80	0–1	15 – Cedano	7 – Cedano	5 – Jones	McCamish Pavilion (6,326); Atlanta, GA
November 7, 2026*; 2:00 p.m., FloCollege		Queens (NY)	W 75–44	1–1	19 – Jones	10 – Tied	7 – Jones	Mack Sports Complex (206); Hempstead, NY
November 11, 2026*; 6:00 p.m., FloCollege		Coppin State	W 58–54	2–1	14 – Karim	11 – Jacobs	7 – Jones	Mack Sports Complex (188); Hempstead, NY
November 15, 2026*; 1:00 p.m., ESPN+		at Iona						Hynes Athletic Center; New Rochelle, NY
November 24, 2026*; 5:00 p.m., ESPN+		at Penn						The Palestra; Philadelphia, PA
November 29, 2026*; 3:00 p.m.		at Fordham						Rose Hill Gymnasium; The Bronx, NY
December 4, 2026*; 7:00 p.m.		at Prairie View A&M						William J. Nicks Building; Prairie View, TX
December 6, 2026*; 12:00 p.m., SECN+		at Texas A&M						Reed Arena; College Station, TX
December 9, 2026*; 6:00 p.m., FloCollege		Wilmington (DE)						Mack Sports Complex; Hempstead, NY
December 12, 2026*; 2:00 p.m., FloCollege		Albany						Mack Sports Complex; Hempstead, NY
December 21, 2026*; 11:00 a.m., FloCollege		Delaware State						Mack Sports Complex; Hempstead, NY
CAA regular season
January 1, 2027; 1:00 p.m., FloCollege		at Northeastern						Cabot Center; Boston, MA
January 3, 2027; 1:00 p.m., FloCollege		at Stony Brook						Stony Brook Arena; Stony Brook, NY
January 8, 2027; 6:00 p.m., FloCollege		UNC Wilmington						Mack Sports Complex; Hempstead, NY
January 10, 2027; 3:00 p.m., FloCollege		Towson						Mack Sports Complex; Hempstead, NY
January 15, 2027; 6:00 p.m., FloCollege		Monmouth						Mack Sports Complex; Hempstead, NY
January 22, 2027; 7:00 p.m., FloCollege		at William & Mary						Kaplan Arena; Williamsburg, VA
January 24, 2027; 2:00 p.m., FloCollege		at Hampton						Hampton Convocation Center; Hampton, VA
January 29, 2027; 11:00 a.m., FloCollege		at Towson						SECU Arena; Towson, MD
January 31, 2027; 2:00 p.m., FloCollege		Northeastern						Mack Sports Complex; Hempstead, NY
February 5, 2027; 6:00 p.m., FloCollege		Drexel						Mack Sports Complex; Hempstead, NY
February 7, 2027; 1:00 p.m., FloCollege		Campbell						Mack Sports Complex; Hempstead, NY
February 12, 2027; 7:00 p.m., FloCollege		at North Carolina A&T						Corbett Sports Center; Greensboro, NC
February 14, 2027; 1:00 p.m., FloCollege		at Elon						Schar Center; Elon, NC
February 21, 2027; 1:00 p.m., FloCollege		Charleston						Mack Sports Complex; Hempstead, NY
February 26, 2027; 6:00 p.m., FloCollege		at Drexel						Daskalakis Athletic Center; Philadelphia, PA
February 28, 2027; 2:00 p.m., FloCollege		at Monmouth						OceanFirst Bank Center; West Long Branch, NJ
March 4, 2027; 6:00 p.m., FloCollege		at Stony Brook						Mack Sports Complex; Hempstead, NY
March 6, 2027; 2:00 p.m., FloCollege		at North Carolina A&T						Mack Sports Complex; Hempstead, NY
CAA tournament
March 10–14, 2027; TBA, FloCollege		vs.						CareFirst Arena; Washington, D.C.
*Non-conference game. ^{#}Rankings from AP Poll. (#) Tournament seedings in parentheses. All times are in Eastern.
