= 2026–27 William & Mary Tribe women's basketball team =

American college basketball season

2026–27 William & Mary Tribe women's basketball
- Conference: Coastal Athletic Association
- Record: 2–1 (0–0 CAA)
- Head coach: Erin Dickerson Davis (5th season)
- Associate head coach: Dane Sparrow
- Assistant coaches: Kenia Cole; Graceann Bennett
- Home arena: Kaplan Arena

2026–27 CAA women's basketball standings
	Conf.				Overall
Team	W		L	PCT	W		L	PCT
Monmouth	0	–	0	–	2	–	0	1.000
Stony Brook	0	–	0	–	2	–	0	1.000
UNC Wilmington	0	–	0	–	2	–	0	1.000
Charleston	0	–	0	–	2	–	1	.667
William & Mary	0	–	0	–	2	–	1	.667
Drexel	0	–	0	–	1	–	1	.500
Elon	0	–	0	–	1	–	1	.500
Hofstra	0	–	0	–	1	–	1	.500
Northeastern	0	–	0	–	1	–	1	.500
Hampton	0	–	0	–	1	–	2	.333
North Carolina A&T	0	–	0	–	1	–	2	.333
Towson	0	–	0	–	1	–	2	.333
Campbell	0	–	0	–	0	–	3	.000
† 2027 CAA tournament winner As of November 12, 2026

The 2026–27 William & Mary Tribe women's basketball team currently represents the College of William & Mary during the 2026–27 NCAA Division I women's basketball season. The Tribe, led by fifth-year head coach Erin Dickerson Davis, play their home games at Kaplan Arena in Williamsburg, Virginia, and compete as a member of the Coastal Athletic Association.

== Previous season ==
The Tribe finished the 2025–26 season 17–14 overall and 9–9 in CAA play, to finish eighth in the conference. As the No. 8 seed in the CAA tournament, they won against No. 9 North Carolina A&T 61–58 in the second round, then fell just short of pulling off the upset on top-seeded Charleston as they lost 55–58 in the quarterfinals to end their season.

== Offseason ==
=== Departures ===
William & Mary departures
Name	Num	Pos.	Height	Year	Hometown	Reason for departure
Alexa Mileska	0	Guard	5'8"	Senior	Carlsbad, CA	Graduated
Kyah Smith	9	Guard	5'9"	Junior	Richmond, VA	Transferred to North Alabama
Aislinn Gibson	11	Guard	6'2"	Junior	Hingham, MA	Medically retired
Jana Sallman	12	Center	6'3"	Junior	Cairo, Egypt	Transferred to Grand Canyon

=== Incoming transfers ===
There were no incoming transfers for the 2026–27 season.

=== Recruiting class ===
There was no recruiting class for 2026.

== Preseason ==
On October 15, 2026, the CAA released its annual preseason coaches poll and awards. William & Mary was picked to finish fourth in the conference, with one first-place vote.

=== Preseason rankings ===
CAA Preseason Coaches Poll
Place	Team	Votes
1	Monmouth	144 (12)
2	Elon	116
3	Drexel	116
4	William & Mary	109 (1)
5	Towson	99
6	North Carolina A&T	89
7	Stony Brook	88
8	Charleston	71
9	Hofstra	56
10	Hampton	51
11	Northeastern	35
12	Campbell	30
13	UNC Wilmington	18
(#) first-place votes

=== Preseason All-CAA Teams ===
Preseason All-CAA Teams
Player	Year	Position	Team
Cassidy Geddes	Senior	Guard	First

=== CAA Preseason Honorable Mentions ===
Preseason CAA Honorable Mentions
Player	Year	Position
Monet Dance	Senior	Guard

== Roster ==
2026–27 William & Mary Tribe women's basketball team
Players
Coaches

Pos.	#	Name	Height	Year	Previous school	Hometown
G	0	Denver Carlton	5 ft 10 in (1.78 m)	Fr	St. James Academy	Ashburn, VA
G	1	Cassidy Geddes	5 ft 7 in (1.7 m)	Sr	Newton-Conover High School	Hickory, NC
G	2	Monet Dance	5 ft 3 in (1.6 m)	Sr	Mount Pisgah Christian School	Roswell, GA
G	3	Jordyn Steindl	5 ft 8 in (1.73 m)	So	Western Reserve Academy	State College, PA
G	4	Ari Mercado	5 ft 5 in (1.65 m)	So	East New York Family Academy	Brooklyn, NY
G	5	Skyla Mastronardi	5 ft 10 in (1.78 m)	Fr	Smithsburg High School	Hagerstown, MD
G	7	Dynasti Pierce	6 ft 0 in (1.83 m)	So	Lafayette High School	Smithfield, VA
F	10	Marley Long	6 ft 2 in (1.88 m)	Jr	Sidwell Friends School	Washington, D.C.
G	13	Sophia LeGoullon	6 ft 1 in (1.85 m)	Jr	Tilton School	Bedford, NH
F	15	Amelia Basit	6 ft 1 in (1.85 m)	So	St. Francis School	Suwanee, GA
F	21	Natalie Fox	6 ft 4 in (1.93 m)	Jr	Millbrook High School	LaGrangeville, NY
F	23	Aisha Dos Santos	6 ft 1 in (1.85 m)	Sr	Parkview Christian Academy; Odessa College	São Bernardo, Brazil
G	24	Emma West	5 ft 10 in (1.78 m)	Jr	Georgetown Visitation Prep	Great Falls, VA

Head coach

- Erin Dickerson Davis (Northwestern)

Assistant coach(es)

- Dane Sparrow (UNC Greensboro)
- Kenia Cole (Hampton)
- Graceann Bennett (Georgetown)

Legend

- (C) Team captain
- (S) Suspended
- (I) Ineligible
- (W) Walk-on
- Injured
- Current redshirt

Roster
Last update: July 20, 2026

== Schedule and results ==
Date time, TV	Rank^{#}	Opponent^{#}	Result	Record	High points	High rebounds	High assists	Site (attendance) city, state
Exhibition
October 30, 2026*; 7:00 p.m.		Christopher Newport	W 81–37		11 – Mastronardi	6 – Tied	5 – Carlton	Kaplan Arena; Williamsburg, VA
Non-conference regular season
November 2, 2026*; 4:00 p.m., FloCollege		Chowan	W 81–37	1–0	18 – Geddes	11 – Fox	7 – Mastronardi	Kaplan Arena (951); Williamsburg, VA
November 5, 2026*; 7:00 p.m., FloCollege		Tennessee State	W 78–54	2–0	20 – Geddes	17 – Fox	3 – Geddes	Kaplan Arena (781); Williamsburg, VA
November 8, 2026*; 2:00 p.m., ACCNX		at Virginia	L 58–99	2–1	15 – Carlton	7 – Fox	6 – Dance	John Paul Jones Arena (4,008); Charlottesville, VA
November 15, 2026*; 2:00 p.m., ESPN+		at Richmond						Robins Center; Richmond, VA
November 19, 2026*; 6:30 p.m., ESPN+		at Old Dominion						Chartway Arena; Norfolk, VA
November 24, 2026*; 11:00 a.m., MEAC Network		at Coppin State						Physical Education Complex; Baltimore, MD
November 28, 2026*; 1:00 p.m., FloCollege/MASN		Longwood						Kaplan Arena; Williamsburg, VA
December 3, 2026*; 7:00 p.m., FloCollege		American						Kaplan Arena; Williamsburg, VA
December 15, 2026*; 7:00 p.m., FloCollege		VUL						Kaplan Arena; Williamsburg, VA
December 18, 2026*; 11:00 a.m., ESPN+		Penn						The Palestra; Philadelphia, PA
December 20, 2026*; 1:00 p.m., ESPN+		Loyola Maryland						Reitz Arena; Baltimore, MD
CAA regular season
January 1, 2027; 1:00 p.m., FloCollege/MASN		Campbell						Kaplan Arena; Williamsburg, VA
January 8, 2027; 7:00 p.m., FloCollege		at Elon						Schar Center; Elon, NC
January 10, 2027; 1:00 p.m., FloCollege/MASN		Charleston						Kaplan Arena; Williamsburg, VA
January 15, 2027; 7:00 p.m., FloCollege/MASN		Hampton						Kaplan Arena; Williamsburg, VA
January 17, 2027; 1:00 p.m., FloCollege		at UNC Wilmington						Trask Coliseum; Wilmington, NC
January 22, 2027; 7:00 p.m., FloCollege/MASN		Hofstra						Kaplan Arena; Williamsburg, VA
January 24, 2027; 1:00 p.m., FloCollege/MASN		Elon						Kaplan Arena; Williamsburg, VA
January 29, 2027; 6:00 p.m., FloCollege		at Campbell						Gore Arena; Buies Creek, NC
January 31, 2027; 2:00 p.m., FloCollege		at Hampton						Hampton Convocation Center; Hampton, VA
February 7, 2027; 1:00 p.m., FloCollege/MASN		North Carolina A&T						Kaplan Arena; Williamsburg, VA
February 12, 2027; 6:30 p.m., FloCollege		at Towson						SECU Arena; Towson, MD
February 14, 2027; 1:00 p.m., FloCollege		at Drexel						Daskalakis Athletic Center; Philadelphia, PA
February 19, 2027; 7:00 p.m., FloCollege/MASN		Northeastern						Kaplan Arena; Williamsburg, VA
February 21, 2027; 2:00 p.m., FloCollege		at North Carolina A&T						Corbett Sports Center; Greensboro, NC
February 26, 2027; 7:00 p.m., FloCollege/MASN		UNC Wilmington						Kaplan Arena; Williamsburg, VA
February 28, 2027; 1:00 p.m., FloCollege/MASN		Towson						Kaplan Arena; Williamsburg, VA
March 4, 2027; 6:00 p.m., FloCollege		at Monmouth						OceanFirst Bank Center; West Long Branch, NJ
March 6, 2027; 1:00 p.m., FloCollege		at Stony Brook						Stony Brook Arena; Stony Brook, NY
CAA tournament
March 10–14, 2027; TBA, FloCollege		vs.						CareFirst Arena; Washington, D.C.
*Non-conference game. ^{#}Rankings from AP Poll. (#) Tournament seedings in parentheses. All times are in Eastern.
