= 2026–27 North Carolina A&T Aggies women's basketball team =

American college basketball season

2026–27 North Carolina A&T Aggies women's basketball
- Conference: Coastal Athletic Association
- Record: 2–3 (0–0 CAA)
- Head coach: Tarrell Robinson (15th season)
- Associate head coach: Shavon Earp
- Assistant coaches: Kelly Mathis; Chris Dunn
- Home arena: Corbett Sports Center

2026–27 CAA women's basketball standings
	Conf.				Overall
Team	W		L	PCT	W		L	PCT
Stony Brook	0	–	0	–	4	–	0	1.000
Monmouth	0	–	0	–	3	–	1	.750
UNC Wilmington	0	–	0	–	3	–	1	.750
Northeastern	0	–	0	–	2	–	1	.667
Towson	0	–	0	–	3	–	2	.600
Charleston	0	–	0	–	2	–	2	.500
Elon	0	–	0	–	2	–	2	.500
Hofstra	0	–	0	–	2	–	2	.500
North Carolina A&T	0	–	0	–	2	–	2	.500
William & Mary	0	–	0	–	2	–	2	.500
Drexel	0	–	0	–	1	–	3	.250
Campbell	0	–	0	–	1	–	4	.200
Hampton	0	–	0	–	1	–	4	.200
† 2027 CAA tournament winner As of November 18, 2026

The 2026–27 North Carolina A&T Aggies women's basketball team currently represents North Carolina A&T State University during the 2026–27 NCAA Division I women's basketball season. The Aggies, led by fifteenth-year head coach Tarrell Robinson, play their home games at the Corbett Sports Center in Greensboro, North Carolina, and compete as a member of the Coastal Athletic Association.

== Previous season ==
The Aggies finished the 2025–26 season 12–18 overall and 7–11 in CAA play, finishing ninth in the conference. As the No. 9 seed in the CAA tournament, they lost 58–61 to No. 8 William & Mary in the second round to end their season.

== Offseason ==
=== Departures ===
North Carolina A&T departures
Name	Number	Pos.	Height	Year	Hometown	Reason for departure
Londyn Walker	2	Guard	5'8"	Freshman	Atlanta, GA	Transferred to Alabama State
Rachel Griffin	5	Forward	6'3"	Sophomore	Oakland, TN	Transferred to Alabama State
D'Mya Tucker	10	Guard	5'11"	Graduate Student	Orangeburg, SC	Graduated
Eva Andrews	11	Guard	5'8"	Sophomore	Barrington, NJ	Transferred to Mount St. Mary's
Ja'naya Meyers	12	Guard	5'9"	Freshman	Jersey City, NJ	Entered transfer portal
Elliot Jessup	15	Forward	6'0"	Sophomore	Winston-Salem, NC	Transferred to Alabama State
Shimei Muhammad	21	Forward	6'0"	Graduate Student	Brooklyn, NY	Graduated
Chaniya Clark	33	Center	6'4"	(redshirt) Senior	Fort Myers, FL	Graduated

=== Incoming transfers ===
North Carolina A&T incoming transfers
Name	Number	Pos.	Height	Year	Hometown	Previous school
Maraja Pass	2	Guard	5'4"	Senior	Shelby, NC	Elon
Jada Bates	5	Forward	6'3"	Junior	Powder Springs, GA	Arkansas
Yves Cox	6	Center	6'3"	Junior	Savannah, TX	Arkansas State
Drew Alexander	12	Guard	5'10"	Senior	Durham, NC	Temple
Rania Curry	30	Guard	5'9"	Sophomore	Augusta, GA	Mercer
Icyss Storm	33	Forward	6'1"	Sophomore	Durham, NC	UNC Wilmington

=== Recruiting class ===
There was no 2026 recruiting class.

== Preseason ==
On October 15, 2026, the CAA released its annual preseason coaches poll and awards. North Carolina A&T was picked to finish sixth in the conference.

=== Preseason rankings ===
CAA Preseason Coaches Poll
Place	Team	Votes
1	Monmouth	144 (12)
2	Elon	116
3	Drexel	109
4	William & Mary	108 (1)
5	Towson	99
6	North Carolina A&T	89
7	Stony Brook	88
8	Charleston	71
9	Hofstra	56
10	Hampton	51
11	Northeastern	35
12	Campbell	30
13	UNC Wilmington	18
(#) first-place votes

=== Preseason All-CAA Teams ===
Preseason All-CAA Teams
Player	Year	Position	Team
Paris Locke	Senior	Forward	First

=== CAA Preseason Honorable Mentions ===
No players were named CAA Preseason Honorable Mentions.

== Roster ==
Years are listed according to the new NCAA age-based eligibility model.

2026–27 North Carolina A&T Aggies women's basketball team
Players
Coaches

Pos.	#	Name	Height	Year	Previous school	Hometown
F	0	Darrionna Howard	5 ft 11 in (1.8 m)	Jr	Clayton High School; Delaware	Smithfield, NC
G	1	Honor Hall	5 ft 9 in (1.75 m)	Fr	Richmond Heights High School	Richmond Heights, OH
G	2	Maraja Pass	5 ft 4 in (1.63 m)	Sr	Shelby High School; Elon	Shelby, NC
G	3	Crystal Hardy	5 ft 8 in (1.73 m)	So	Emmanuel Christian Academy	Cheltenham, MD
F	4	Anaya Karriem	6 ft 2 in (1.88 m)	So	West Orange High School	West Orange, NJ
F	5	Jada Bates	6 ft 3 in (1.91 m)	Jr	McEachern High School; Arkansas	Powder Springs, GA
C	6	Yves Cox	6 ft 3 in (1.91 m)	Jr	Braswell High School; Arkansas State	Savannah, TX
C	9	Kaylin Pernell	6 ft 3 in (1.91 m)	Fr	Oak City Prep	Raleigh, NC
G	12	Drew Alexander	5 ft 10 in (1.78 m)	Sr	Greensboro Day School; Temple	Durham, NC
G	13	Brook Evans	5 ft 9 in (1.75 m)	Fr	South Central High School	Greenville, NC
G	20	Whitley Davis	5 ft 11 in (1.8 m)	Fr	Winton Woods High School	Fairfield, OH
G	23	Jamyia Lindsey	5 ft 6 in (1.68 m)	So	Richmond Senior High School	Rockingham, NC
F	25	Paris Locke	6 ft 0 in (1.83 m)	Sr	McDonogh School	Baltimore, MD
G	30	Rania Curry	5 ft 9 in (1.75 m)	So	Butler High School; Mercer	Augusta, GA
F	33	Icyss Storm (injured)	6 ft 1 in (1.85 m)	So	Grace Christian School; UNC Wilmington	Durham, NC

Head coach

- Tarrell Robinson (North Carolina A&T)

Assistant coach(es)

- Shavon Earp (Radford)
- Kelly Mathis (Pfeiffer)
- Chris Dunn (West Virginia State)

Legend

- (C) Team captain
- (S) Suspended
- (I) Ineligible
- (W) Walk-on
- Injured
- Current redshirt

Roster
Last update: September 7, 2026

== Schedule and results ==
Date time, TV	Rank^{#}	Opponent^{#}	Result	Record	High points	High rebounds	High assists	Site (attendance) city, state
Exhibition
October 18, 2026*; 2:00 p.m.		Wake Forest	L 43–68		12 – Bates	6 – Bates	2 – Tied	Corbett Sports Center (647); Greensboro, NC
Non-conference regular season
November 2, 2026*; 7:00 p.m., FloCollege		Wingate	W 70–59	1–0	17 – Alexander	11 – Locke	3 – Locke	Corbett Sports Center (855); Greensboro, NC
November 6, 2026*; 6:00 p.m., ESPN+		at Marshall	L 45–62	1–1	10 – Bates	10 – Karriem	3 – Tied	Cam Henderson Center (1,545); Huntington, WV
November 10, 2026*; 8:00 p.m., B1G+		at No. 25 Nebraska	L 35–76	1–2	10 – Howard	6 – Locke	3 – Pass	Pinnacle Bank Arena (4,117); Lincoln, NE
November 13, 2026*; 6:00 p.m., FloCollege		Guilford	W 80-32	2-2	–	–	–	Corbett Sports Center (524); Greensboro, NC
November 17, 2026*; 7:00 p.m., FloCollege		Liberty	L 50–53	2–3	14 – Bates	6 – Bates	4 – Howard	Corbett Sports Center; Greensboro, NC
November 20, 2026*; 6:00 p.m., ESPN+		at Navy						Alumni Hall; Annapolis, MD
November 27, 2026*; 11:00 a.m., ESPN+		vs. Abilene Christian; North Florida Invitational						UNF Arena; Jacksonville, FL
November 28, 2026*; 1:30 p.m., ESPN+		at North Florida; North Florida Invitational						UNF Arena; Jacksonville, FL
December 1, 2026*; 7:00 p.m., FloCollege		Bowling Green						Corbett Sports Center; Greensboro, NC
December 12, 2026*; 2:00 p.m., FloCollege		Kennesaw State						Corbett Sports Center; Greensboro, NC
December 16, 2026*; 6:00 p.m., MEAC Network		at North Carolina Central						Corbett Sports Center; Greensboro, NC
December 19, 2026*; 2:00 p.m., FloCollege		Saint Francis (PA)						Corbett Sports Center; Greensboro, NC
December 29, 2026*; 2:00 p.m., FloCollege		Lander						Corbett Sports Center; Greensboro, NC
CAA regular season
January 1, 2027; 2:00 p.m., FloCollege		Hampton						Corbett Sports Center; Greensboro, NC
January 3, 2027; 1:00 p.m., FloCollege		at UNC Wilmington						Trask Coliseum; Wilmington, NC
January 8, 2027; 7:00 p.m., FloCollege		Stony Brook						Corbett Sports Center; Greensboro, NC
January 10, 2027; 1:00 p.m., FloCollege		Drexel						Corbett Sports Center; Greensboro, NC
January 15, 2027; 6:00 p.m., FloCollege		at Charleston						TD Arena; Charleston, SC
January 17, 2027; 1:00 p.m., FloCollege		at Elon						Schar Center; Elon, NC
January 24, 2027; 1:00 p.m., FloCollege		at Northeastern						Cabot Center; Boston, MA
January 29, 2027; 7:00 p.m., FloCollege		Monmouth						Corbett Sports Center; Greensboro, NC
January 31, 2027; 2:00 p.m., FloCollege		UNC Wilmington						Corbett Sports Center; Greensboro, NC
February 5, 2027; 7:00 p.m., FloCollege		at Hampton						Hampton Convocation Center; Hampton, VA
February 7, 2027; 1:00 p.m., FloCollege		at William & Mary						Kaplan Arena; Williamsburg, VA
February 12, 2027; 7:00 p.m., FloCollege		Hofstra						Corbett Sports Center; Greensboro, NC
February 14, 2027; 2:00 p.m., FloCollege		at Campbell						Gore Arena; Buies Creek, NC
February 21, 2027; 2:00 p.m., FloCollege		William & Mary						Corbett Sports Center; Greensboro, NC
February 26, 2027; 7:00 p.m., FloCollege		Elon						Corbett Sports Center; Greensboro, NC
February 28, 2027; 2:00 p.m., FloCollege		Campbell						Corbett Sports Center; Greensboro, NC
March 4, 2027; 6:30 p.m., FloCollege		at Towson						SECU Arena; Towson, MD
March 6, 2027; 2:00 p.m., FloCollege		at Hofstra						Mack Sports Complex; Hempstead, NY
CAA tournament
March 10–14, 2027; TBA, FloCollege		vs.						CareFirst Arena; Washington, D.C.
*Non-conference game. ^{#}Rankings from AP Poll. (#) Tournament seedings in parentheses. All times are in Eastern.
