= 2026–27 Monmouth Hawks women's basketball team =

American college basketball season

2026–27 Monmouth Hawks women's basketball
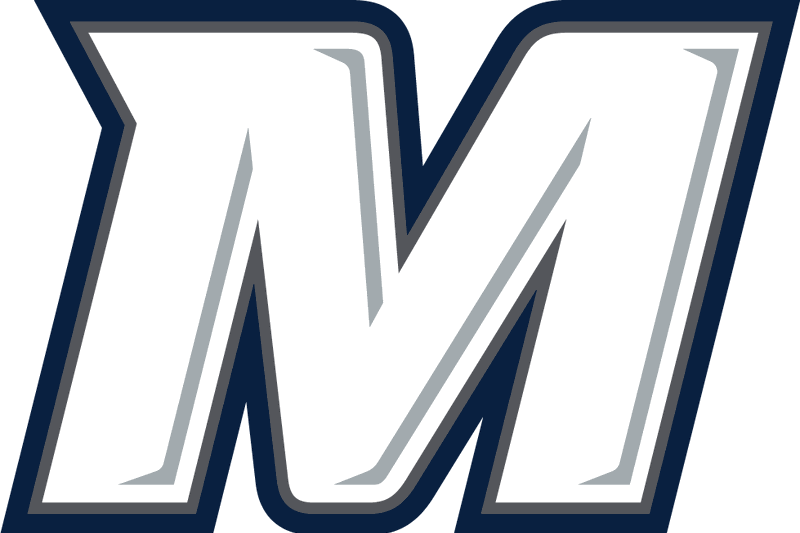
- Conference: Coastal Athletic Association
- Record: 5–1 (0–0 CAA)
- Head coach: Cait Wetmore (3rd season)
- Assistant coaches: Cristina Centeno; Anna Newman; John Azzinaro; Myisha Hines-Allen
- Home arena: OceanFirst Bank Center

2026–27 CAA women's basketball standings
	Conf.				Overall
Team	W		L	PCT	W		L	PCT
Monmouth	0	–	0	–	5	–	1	.833
Stony Brook	0	–	0	–	4	–	1	.800
UNC Wilmington	0	–	0	–	3	–	1	.750
Charleston	0	–	0	–	3	–	2	.600
Elon	0	–	0	–	3	–	2	.600
William & Mary	0	–	0	–	3	–	2	.600
Hofstra	0	–	0	–	2	–	2	.500
Towson	0	–	0	–	3	–	4	.429
Drexel	0	–	0	–	2	–	3	.400
Northeastern	0	–	0	–	2	–	3	.400
North Carolina A&T	0	–	0	–	2	–	4	.333
Hampton	0	–	0	–	1	–	4	.200
Campbell	0	–	0	–	1	–	6	.143
† 2027 CAA tournament winner As of November 22, 2026

The 2026–27 Monmouth Hawks women's basketball team currently represents Monmouth University during the 2026–27 NCAA Division I women's basketball season. The Hawks, led by third-year head coach Cait Wetmore, play their home games at OceanFirst Bank Center in West Long Branch, New Jersey, and compete as a member of the Coastal Athletic Association.

== Previous season ==
The Hawks finished the 2025–26 season 21–12 overall and 12–6 in CAA play, to finish in a tie for fourth in the conference with Stony Brook. As the No. 5 seed in the CAA tournament, they earned a bye to the second round, where they defeated No. 13 UNC Wilmington 72–61 before falling 45–51 in the quarterfinals to No. 4 Stony Brook.

Following their tournament elimination, the Hawks accepted an at-large bid to the WNIT, their 3rd overall appearance and their first since 2024. They defeated Lehigh in the first round, then were eliminated in the second round to Cleveland State to end their season.

== Offseason ==
=== Departures ===
Monmouth departures
Name	Number	Pos.	Height	Year	Hometown	Reason for Departure
Adena Webster	0	Guard	5'8"	Sophomore	Nassau, Bahamas	Entered transfer portal
Alexis Andrews	4	Guard	5'8"	Senior	Montgomery, AL	Graduated
Isabella Murray	7	Guard	5'9"	Junior	Green Brook, NJ	TBD; not listed on roster
Fatumata Djaló	8	Guard	5'7"	Sophomore	Aveiro, Portugal	Transferred to Idaho
Rebecca Milon	11	Forward	5'9"	Sophomore	Nepean, ON	Transferred to Northwestern State
Ella Farrelly	23	Forward	6'3"	Senior	Guelph, ON	Graduated
Alexis Davis	40	Forward	5'10"	Junior	Glassboro, NJ	Transferred to Norfolk State

=== Incoming transfers ===
Monmouth incoming transfers
Name	Number	Pos.	Height	Year	Hometown	Previous School
Vanessa McManus	0	Guard	5'8"	Junior	Staten Island, NY	Cal Poly
Kailah Correa	1	Guard	5'4"	Sophomore	Lebanon, PA	Delaware
Sanai Tyler	21	Forward	6'0"	Senior	Chicago, IL	Bethune–Cookman

=== Recruiting class ===
There was no 2026 recruiting class.

== Preseason ==
On October 15, 2026, the CAA released its annual preseason coaches poll and awards. Monmouth was unanimously picked to finish first in the conference, earning all twelve first place votes. Senior guard Gigi Gamble was also named the CAA Preseason Player of the Year.

=== Preseason rankings ===
CAA Preseason Coaches Poll
Place	Team	Votes
1	Monmouth	144 (12)
2	Elon	116
3	Drexel	109
4	William & Mary	108 (1)
5	Towson	99
6	North Carolina A&T	89
7	Stony Brook	88
8	Charleston	71
9	Hofstra	56
10	Hampton	51
11	Northeastern	35
12	Campbell	30
13	UNC Wilmington	18
(#) first-place votes

=== Preseason All-CAA Teams ===
Preseason All-CAA Teams
Player	Year	Position	Team
Divine Dibula	Graduate Student	Forward	First
Gigi Gamble	Senior	Guard	First

=== CAA Preseason Honorable Mentions ===
No players were named CAA Preseason Honorable Mentions.

== Roster ==
2026–27 Monmouth Hawks women's basketball team
Players
Coaches

Pos.	#	Name	Height	Year	Previous school	Hometown
G	0	Vanessa McManus	5 ft 8 in (1.73 m)	Jr	Nazareth Regional High School; Cal Poly	Staten Island, NY
G	1	Kailah Correa	5 ft 4 in (1.63 m)	So	Lebanon High School; Delaware	Lebanon, PA
G	2	Gigi Gamble	5 ft 5 in (1.65 m)	Sr	Life Center Academy; CCBC Essex	Somerset, NJ
F	3	Tessa Carman	5 ft 11 in (1.8 m)	So	Red Bank Catholic High School	Barnegat, NJ
F	4	Kalina Krupinikovic	6 ft 3 in (1.91 m)	Fr	Luleå gymnasieskola	Solna, Sweden
F	5	Sydney Hendrix	5 ft 9 in (1.75 m)	RS Jr	West Bloomfield High School; Florida A&M	Farmington Hills, MI
G	7	Kathy Kersaint	5 ft 9 in (1.75 m)	So	Dawson College	Repentigny, QC
G	9	Claudia Xaudaro	5 ft 7 in (1.7 m)	RS Fr	Escola Pia Santa Anna	Mataró, Spain
F	13	Divine Dibula	6 ft 0 in (1.83 m)	GS	École secondaire Gisèle Lalonde; Champlain College Saint-Lambert	Ottawa, ON
G	14	Kellyn Preira	5 ft 10 in (1.78 m)	RS Jr	St. Mary's High School	Peabody, MA
F	21	Sanai Tyler	6 ft 0 in (1.83 m)	Sr	Kenwood Academy; Bethune–Cookman	Chicago, IL
G	23	Lexi Carnegie	5 ft 9 in (1.75 m)	Fr	Teaneck High School	Teaneck, NJ
G	24	Madalena Amaro	5 ft 7 in (1.7 m)	So	Escola Secundária Rainha Dona Leonor	Faro, Portugal

Head coach

- Cait Wetmore (Adelphi)

Assistant coach(es)

- Cristina Centeno (Siena)
- Anna Newman (Evansville)
- John Azzinaro (Bucknell)
- Myisha Hines-Allen (Louisville)

Legend

- (C) Team captain
- (S) Suspended
- (I) Ineligible
- (W) Walk-on
- Injured
- Current redshirt

Roster
Last update: October 29, 2026

== Schedule and results ==
Date time, TV	Rank^{#}	Opponent^{#}	Result	Record	High points	High rebounds	High assists	Site (attendance) city, state
Exhibition
October 21, 2026*; 5:30 p.m.		Rider	W 78–49		24 – Gamble	9 – Dibula	5 – McManus	OceanFirst Bank Center (346); West Long Beach, NJ
Non-conference regular season
November 2, 2026*; 6:00 p.m., FloCollege/NBCSN		Binghamton	W 63–40	1–0	19 – Gamble	10 – Dibula	4 – Amaro	OceanFirst Bank Center (428); West Long Beach, NJ
November 6, 2026*; 6:00 p.m., FloCollege/NBCSN		Lehigh	W 75–67	2–0	28 – Gamble	9 – Dibula	4 – Amaro	OceanFirst Bank Center (511); West Long Beach, NJ
November 11, 2026*; 7:00 p.m., B1G+		at Rutgers	L 62–64	2–1	30 – Gamble	7 – Amaro	6 – Amaro	Jersey Mike's Arena (1,606); Piscataway, NJ
November 13, 2026*; 6:00 p.m., FloCollege		Bryant & Stratton	W 125–31	3–1	24 – Correa	14 – Carman	8 – Tied	OceanFirst Bank Center (212); West Long Beach, NJ
November 17, 2026*; 7:00 p.m., FloCollege		Marist	W 91–71	4–1	24 – Gamble	6 – Tyler	8 – Amaro	OceanFirst Bank Center (433); West Long Beach, NJ
November 21, 2026*; 2:00 p.m., FloCollege		Maryland Eastern Shore	W 108–60	5–1	31 – Gamble	9 – Tied	8 – Amaro	OceanFirst Bank Center (384); West Long Beach, NJ
November 24, 2026*; 7:00 p.m., B1G+		at Maryland						Xfinity Center; College Park, MD
November 28, 2026*; 1:00 p.m., FloCollege		Fairleigh Dickinson						OceanFirst Bank Center; West Long Beach, NJ
December 2, 2026*; 4:30 p.m., ESPN+		at NJIT						Wellness and Events Center; Newark, NJ
December 6, 2026*; 2:00 p.m., MEAC Network		at Howard						Burr Gymnasium; Washington, D.C.
December 11, 2026*; 6:00 p.m., MEAC Network		at Coppin State						Physical Education Complex; Baltimore, MD
December 15, 2026*; 11:30 a.m., FloCollege		Georgian Court						OceanFirst Bank Center; West Long Beach, NJ
December 20, 2026*; 1:00 p.m., FloCollege		Cornell						OceanFirst Bank Center; West Long Beach, NJ
December 28, 2026*; 5:00 p.m., FloCollege		Cheyney						OceanFirst Bank Center; West Long Beach, NJ
CAA regular season
January 1, 2027; 6:00 p.m., FloCollege		at UNC Wilmington						Trask Coliseum; Wilmington, NC
January 3, 2027; 1:00 p.m., FloCollege		at Charleston						TD Arena; Charleston, SC
January 8, 2027; 6:00 p.m., FloCollege		Towson						OceanFirst Bank Center; West Long Beach, NJ
January 15, 2027; 6:00 p.m., FloCollege		at Hofstra						Mack Sports Complex; Hempstead, NY
January 17, 2027; 2:00 p.m., FloCollege		Drexel						OceanFirst Bank Center; West Long Beach, NJ
January 22, 2027; 6:00 p.m., FloCollege		Stony Brook						OceanFirst Bank Center; West Long Beach, NJ
January 24, 2027; 2:00 p.m., FloCollege		Charleston						OceanFirst Bank Center; West Long Beach, NJ
January 29, 2027; 7:00 p.m., FloCollege		at North Carolina A&T						Corbett Sports Center; Greensboro, NC
January 31, 2027; 2:00 p.m., FloCollege		at Campbell						Gore Arena; Buies Creek, NC
February 5, 2027; 6:00 p.m., FloCollege		Elon						OceanFirst Bank Center; West Long Beach, NJ
February 7, 2027; 2:00 p.m., FloCollege		at Drexel						Daskalakis Athletic Center; Philadelphia, PA
February 12, 2027; 6:00 p.m., FloCollege		Northeastern						OceanFirst Bank Center; West Long Beach, NJ
February 14, 2027; 2:00 p.m., FloCollege		Hampton						OceanFirst Bank Center; West Long Beach, NJ
February 19, 2027; 6:30 p.m., FloCollege		at Towson						SECU Arena; Towson, MD
February 21, 2027; 1:00 p.m., FloCollege		at Stony Brook						Stony Brook Arena; Stony Brook, NY
February 28, 2027; 2:00 p.m., FloCollege		Hofstra						OceanFirst Bank Center; West Long Beach, NJ
March 4, 2027; 6:00 p.m., FloCollege		William & Mary						OceanFirst Bank Center; West Long Beach, NJ
March 6, 2027; 1:00 p.m., FloCollege		at Northeastern						Cabot Center; Boston, MA
CAA tournament
March 10–14, 2027; TBA, FloCollege		vs.						CareFirst Arena; Washington, D.C.
*Non-conference game. ^{#}Rankings from AP Poll. (#) Tournament seedings in parentheses. All times are in Eastern.
