= 2026–27 Wake Forest Demon Deacons women's basketball team =

Intercollegiate basketball season

2026–27 Wake Forest Demon Deacons women's basketball
- Conference: Atlantic Coast Conference
- Record: 2–0 (0–0 ACC)
- Head coach: Megan Gebbia (5th season)
- Assistant coaches: Nikki Flores; Emily Stallings; Jimmy Colloton; Joey White; Teren Hart
- Home arena: LJVM Coliseum

2026–27 ACC women's basketball standings
	Conf.				Overall
Team	W		L	PCT	W		L	PCT
No. 3 Louisville	0	–	0	–	7	–	0	1.000
California	0	–	0	–	5	–	0	1.000
Florida State	0	–	0	–	5	–	0	1.000
Miami (FL)	0	–	0	–	5	–	0	1.000
Virginia	0	–	0	–	5	–	0	1.000
Virginia Tech	0	–	0	–	5	–	0	1.000
No. 5 Duke	0	–	0	–	4	–	0	1.000
No. 13 Notre Dame	0	–	0	–	4	–	0	1.000
Pittsburgh	0	–	0	–	4	–	0	1.000
Syracuse	0	–	0	–	4	–	0	1.000
SMU	0	–	0	–	5	–	1	.833
Clemson	0	–	0	–	4	–	1	.800
Georgia Tech	0	–	0	–	4	–	1	.800
NC State	0	–	0	–	4	–	1	.800
Stanford	0	–	0	–	4	–	1	.800
Wake Forest	0	–	0	–	4	–	1	.800
Boston College	0	–	0	–	3	–	2	.600
No. 24 North Carolina	0	–	0	–	2	–	2	.500
† 2027 ACC tournament winner As of November 19, 2026; Rankings from AP Poll

The 2026–27 Wake Forest Demon Deacons women's basketball team will represent Wake Forest University during the 2026–27 NCAA Division I women's basketball season. The Demon Deacons will be led by fifth-year head coach Megan Gebbia, and will play their games at LJVM Coliseum in Winston-Salem, North Carolina as a member of the Atlantic Coast Conference.

== Previous season ==
The Demon Deacons finished the 2025–26 season 14–18 overall and 4–14 in ACC play, to finish in fifteenth in the conference. As the No. 15 seed in the ACC tournament, they lost in the first round to No. 10 California.

Following their tournament elimination, the Demon Deacons entered into the WNIT, making their first appearance in the tournament, as well as the postseason, since 2023. They lost in the first round to Maryland Eastern Shore 48–59 to end their season.

== Offseason ==
=== Departures ===
Wake Forest departures
Name	Number	Pos.	Height	Year	Hometown	Reason for departure
Milan Brown	0	Guard	5'8"	Freshman	Baltimore, MD	Transferred to Georgia
Raven Preston	1	Guard	5'11"	(redshirt) Junior	Greensboro, NC	Transferred to Appalachian State
Caitlyn Jones	5	Guard	5'8"	Freshman	Rolesville, NC	Transferred to UCF
Grace Oliver	13	Forward	6'1"	Sophomore	Norwell, MA	Transferred to Boston College
Kennedy Moore	15	Forward	6'2"	Sophomore	Kalispell, MT	Transferred to Montana
Emily Johns	44	Forward	6'1"	Graduate student	Washington Township, NJ	Graduated

=== Incoming transfers ===
Wake Forest incoming transfers
Name	Number	Pos.	Height	Year	Hometown	Previous school
Ramiyah Byrd	4	Guard/Forward	5'11"	(redshirt) Junior	Colorado Springs, CO	Cincinnati
Breauna Ware	8	Guard	5'7"	Graduate student	Queens, NY	Wisconsin
Mckenzie Swanson	24	Forward	6'3"	(redshirt) Sophomore	Rochester, MI	Butler

=== Recruiting class ===
There was no 2026 recruiting class.

== Roster ==
2026–27 Wake Forest Demon Deacons women's basketball team
Players
Coaches

Pos.	#	Name	Height	Year	Previous school	Hometown
G	1	Adora Nwude	5 ft 8 in (1.73 m)	Fr	Bullis School	Vienna, VA
G	3	Alexis Cashdollar	5 ft 9 in (1.75 m)	Fr	Mars Area High School	Mars, PA
G/F	4	Ramiyah Byrd	5 ft 11 in (1.8 m)	RS Jr	SPIRE Academy; Cincinnati	Colorado Springs, CO
G	5	Aurora Sørbye	5 ft 9 in (1.75 m)	Jr	Metis Sports Athlete High School	Bergen, Norway
F	7	Savannah Metcalfe	6 ft 5 in (1.96 m)	So	Penrhos College	Perth, Australia
G	8	Breauna Ware	5 ft 7 in (1.7 m)	GS	Mary Louis Academy; Wisconsin	Queens, NY
F	9	Opal Bird	6 ft 3 in (1.91 m)	So	Australian Institute of Sport	Sydney, Australia
F	10	Helena Danielwicz	6 ft 2 in (1.88 m)	Fr	Pawel Adamowicz Secondary School	Kościerzyna, Poland
G/F	14	Mary Carter	6 ft 3 in (1.91 m)	Sr	Antelope High School; Cal Poly	Rocklin, CA
G	22	Madisyn Jordan	6 ft 1 in (1.85 m)	Sr	Panther Creek High School	Morrisville, NC
G	23	Oshauna Holland	5 ft 8 in (1.73 m)	Fr	Stuart W. Cramer High School	Belmont, NC
F	26	Mckenzie Swanson	6 ft 3 in (1.91 m)	RS So	Seaholm High School; Butler	Rochester, MI
G	35	Grace Galbavy	6 ft 0 in (1.83 m)	So	Perkiomen Valley High School	Pennsburg, PA

Head coach

- Megan Gebbia (Towson)

Assistant coach(es)

- Nikki Flores (Marist)
- Emily Stallings (East Stroudsburg)
- Jimmy Colloton (Wittenburg)
- Joey White (West Virginia)
- Teren Hart (Miami (FL))

Legend

- (C) Team captain
- (S) Suspended
- (I) Ineligible
- (W) Walk-on
- Injured
- Current redshirt

Roster
Last update: August 18, 2026

== Schedule and results ==
Date time, TV	Rank^{#}	Opponent^{#}	Result	Record	High points	High rebounds	High assists	Site (attendance) city, state
Exhibition
October 18, 2026*; 2:00 p.m.		at North Carolina A&T	W 68–43		11 – Nwude	4 – Tied	3 – Tied	Corbett Sports Center (647); Greensboro, NC
October 25, 2026*; 5:00 p.m.		UNC Greensboro	W 78–50		16 – Galbavy	9 – Carter	5 – Holland	LJVM Coliseum; Winston-Salem, NC
Regular season
November 2, 2026*; 5:00 p.m., ACCNX		USC Upstate	W 65–58	1–0	19 – Holland	6 – Carter	3 – Tied	LJVM Coliseum (1,061); Winston-Salem, NC
November 5, 2026*; 6:00 p.m., ACCNX		Presbyterian	W 85–53	2–0	14 – Carter	9 – Holland	4 – Nwude	LJVM Coliseum (875); Winston-Salem, NC
November 8, 2026*; 12:30 p.m., ACCNX		Mercer	W 77–51	3–0	21 – Nwude	5 – Carter, Byrd	3 – Ware	LJVM Coliseum (945); Winston-Salem, NC
November 12, 2026*; 11:30 a.m., ACCNX		UNC Wilmington	W 65–48	4–0	17 – Carter	8 – Carter	4 – Sorbye	LJVM Coliseum; Winston-Salem, NC
November 15, 2026*; 3:00 p.m., ACCNX		Elon	L 58–67	4–1	16 – Holland	6 – Holland	4 – Nwude	LJVM Coliseum (1,037); Winston-Salem, NC
November 19, 2026*; 6:00 p.m., ACCNX		Appalachian State						LJVM Coliseum; Winston-Salem, NC
November 23, 2026*; 6:00 p.m., ACC Network		Wofford						LJVM Coliseum; Winston-Salem, NC
November 28, 2026*; 3:00 p.m.		vs. Quinnipiac; Arizona State Invitational						Desert Financial Arena; Tempe, AZ
November 29, 2026*; 3:30 p.m.		at Arizona State; Arizona State Invitational						Desert Financial Arena; Tempe, AZ
December 3, 2026*; 9:00 p.m., SEC Network		at Arkansas; ACC–SEC Challenge						Bud Walton Arena; Fayetteville, AR
December 6, 2026*; TBA		at Auburn						Neville Arena; Auburn, AL
December 13, 2026; 2:00 p.m., ACC Network		Clemson						LJVM Coliseum; Winston-Salem, NC
December 16, 2026*; 6:00 p.m., ACCNX		UNC Asheville						LJVM Coliseum; Winston-Salem, NC
December 19, 2026; 2:00 p.m., ACCNX		at Virginia Tech						Cassell Coliseum; Blacksburg, VA
December 22, 2026*; 1:00 p.m., ACCNX		Furman						LJVM Coliseum; Winston-Salem, NC
December 31, 2026; 1:00 p.m., ACCNX		SMU						LJVM Coliseum; Winston-Salem, NC
January 3, 2027; 2:00 p.m., ACCNX		Pittsburgh						LJVM Coliseum; Winston-Salem, NC
January 7, 2027; 8:00 p.m., ACC Network		at North Carolina						Carmichael Arena; Chapel Hill, NC
January 10, 2027; 4:00 p.m., ACC Network		at Georgia Tech						McCamish Pavilion; Atlanta, GA
January 14, 2027; 6:00 p.m., ACCNX		Stanford						LJVM Coliseum; Winston-Salem, NC
January 17, 2027; 2:00 p.m., ACCNX		California						LJVM Coliseum; Winston-Salem, NC
January 21, 2027; 6:00 p.m., ACCNX		at Virginia						John Paul Jones Arena; Charlottesville, VA
January 24, 2027; 12:00 p.m., ACC Network		at NC State						Reynolds Coliseum; Raleigh, NC
January 31, 2027; 2:00 p.m., ACCNX		at Florida State						Donald L. Tucker Civic Center; Tallahassee, FL
February 4, 2027; 6:00 p.m., ACCNX		Louisville						LJVM Coliseum; Winston-Salem, NC
February 7, 2027; 2:00 p.m., ACCNX		Boston College						LJVM Coliseum; Winston-Salem, NC
February 11, 2027; 7:00 p.m., ACCNX		at Miami (FL)						Watsco Center; Coral Gables, FL
February 14, 2027; 2:00 p.m., ACCNX		at Notre Dame						Purcell Pavilion; South Bend, IN
February 21, 2027; 6:00 p.m., ACC Network		Duke						LJVM Coliseum; Winston-Salem, NC
February 25, 2027; 6:00 p.m., ACCNX		NC State						LJVM Coliseum; Winston-Salem, NC
February 28, 2027; 12:00 p.m., ACC Network		at Syracuse						JMA Wireless Dome; Syracuse, NY
*Non-conference game. ^{#}Rankings from AP Poll. (#) Tournament seedings in parentheses. All times are in Eastern.
