= 2026–27 Stony Brook Seawolves women's basketball team =

American college basketball season

2026–27 Stony Brook Seawolves women's basketball
- Conference: Coastal Athletic Association
- Record: 2–0 (0–0 CAA)
- Head coach: Joy McCorvey (3rd season)
- Assistant coaches: Anjalé Barrett; Kiah Gillespie; Evan Turkish; Bernadette Devaney
- Home arena: Stony Brook Arena

2026–27 CAA women's basketball standings
	Conf.				Overall
Team	W		L	PCT	W		L	PCT
Stony Brook	0	–	0	–	4	–	0	1.000
Monmouth	0	–	0	–	3	–	1	.750
Northeastern	0	–	0	–	2	–	1	.667
UNC Wilmington	0	–	0	–	2	–	1	.667
Towson	0	–	0	–	3	–	2	.600
Charleston	0	–	0	–	2	–	2	.500
Elon	0	–	0	–	2	–	2	.500
Hofstra	0	–	0	–	2	–	2	.500
North Carolina A&T	0	–	0	–	2	–	2	.500
William & Mary	0	–	0	–	2	–	2	.500
Drexel	0	–	0	–	1	–	3	.250
Hampton	0	–	0	–	1	–	3	.250
Campbell	0	–	0	–	1	–	4	.200
† 2027 CAA tournament winner As of November 16, 2026

The 2026–27 Stony Brook Seawolves women's basketball team currently represents Stony Brook University during the 2026–27 NCAA Division I women's basketball season. The Seawolves, led by third-year head coach Joy McCorvey, play their home games at Stony Brook Arena in Stony Brook, New York, and compete as a member of the Coastal Athletic Association.

== Previous season ==
The Seawolves finished the 2025–26 season 18–15 overall and 12–6 in CAA play, finishing in a tie for fourth place in the conference with Monmouth. As the No. 4 seed in the CAA tournament, they earned a double-bye to the quarterfinals, defeating the No. 5 seeded Hawks 51–45 and advancing to the semifinals where they were eliminated by top-seeded Charleston in a 49–79 loss to end their season.

== Offseason ==
=== Departures ===
Stony Brook departures
Name	Num.	Pos.	Height	Year	Hometown	Reason for departure
Nal'La Bennett	2	Guard	5'6"	Freshman	Sicklerville, NJ	Transferred to Longwood
Janay Brantley	3	Guard	6'0"	Junior	Catskill, NY	Transferred to Loyola Marymount
Ioanna Giannopoulou	4	Guard	5'2"	Sophomore	Queens, NY	TBD; not listed on roster
Ebere Egbirika	5	Guard	5'8"	Junior	London, England	Transferred to Saint Peter's
Chloe Oliver	9	Guard	5'8"	Junior	Montreal, Canada	Transferred to Cleveland State
Diaka Berete	10	Guard	5'9"	Graduate student	Toronto, Canada	Graduated
Alona Sellers	12	Forward	6'1"	Graduate student	Hampton, VA	Graduated
Sandra Frau Garcia	20	Guard	5'7"	Graduate student	Faro, Spain	Graduated
Delaney Cooper	22	Guard	5'9"	Freshman	Atlanta, GA	Transferred to Coppin State
Lauren Filien	23	Forward	6'1"	Senior	Cohoes, NY	Transferred to Mercyhurst
Khalis Whiting	30	Guard	5'6"	Senior	Philadelphia, PA	Graduated

=== Incoming transfers ===
Stony Brook incoming transfers
Name	Num.	Pos.	Height	Year	Hometown	Previous school
Jada Cook	0	Guard	5'8"	Junior	Roanoke, VA	Murray State
Leah Philpotts	1	Guard	5'8"	Junior	New Haven, CT	Charleston
Alana Philpotts	2	Guard	5'8"	(redshirt) Sophomore	New Haven, CT	Charleston
Ariel Little	3	Guard	5'4"	Junior	Brooklyn, NY	St. John's
Raiane Dias Dos Santos	4	Guard	5'9"	(redshirt) Senior	São Paulo, Brazil	Virginia
Awa Fane	5	Guard	5'8"	Senior	Thies, Senegal	Mississippi State
Irene Rey Pineda	7	Guard	5'10"	Junior	Madrid, Spain	Canisius
Deb Okechukwu	10	Guard	5'9"	(redshirt) Senior	Washington, D.C.	Rider
Trinity Davis	11	Guard	5'8"	Sophomore	Kankakee, IL	Tyler JC (NJCAA)

=== Recruiting class ===
There was no 2026 recruiting class.

== Preseason ==
On October 15, 2026, the CAA released its annual preseason coaches poll and awards. Stony Brook was picked to finish seventh in the conference.

=== Preseason rankings ===
CAA Preseason Coaches Poll
Place	Team	Votes
1	Monmouth	144 (12)
2	Elon	116
3	Drexel	109
4	William & Mary	108 (1)
5	Towson	99
6	North Carolina A&T	89
7	Stony Brook	88
8	Charleston	71
9	Hofstra	56
10	Hampton	51
11	Northeastern	35
12	Campbell	30
13	UNC Wilmington	18
(#) first-place votes

=== Preseason All-CAA Teams ===
No players were named to the Preseason All-CAA First or Second Team.

=== CAA Preseason Honorable Mentions ===
CAA Preseason Honorable Mentions
Player	Year	Position
Caitlin Frost	Junior	Forward

== Roster ==
2026–27 Stony Brook Seawolves women's basketball team
Players
Coaches

Pos.	#	Name	Height	Year	Previous school	Hometown
G	0	Jada Cook	5 ft 8 in (1.73 m)	Jr	Patrick Henry High School; Murray State	Roanoke, VA
G	1	Leah Philpotts	5 ft 8 in (1.73 m)	Jr	Hamden High School; Charleston	New Haven, CT
G	2	Alana Philpotts	5 ft 8 in (1.73 m)	RS So	Hamden High School; Charleston	New Haven, CT
G	3	Ariel Little	5 ft 4 in (1.63 m)	Jr	South Shore High School; St. John's	Brooklyn, NY
G	4	Raiane Dias Dos Santos	5 ft 9 in (1.75 m)	RS Sr	Virginia	São Paulo, Brazil
G	5	Awa Fane	5 ft 8 in (1.73 m)	Sr	Life Preparatory Academy; Mississippi State	Thies, Senegal
G	7	Irene Rey Pineda	5 ft 10 in (1.78 m)	Jr	CB Estudiantes; Canisius	Madrid, Spain
F	8	Johanna Potter	6 ft 0 in (1.83 m)	So	Wesleyan School	Stockbridge, GA
G	10	Deb Okechukwu	5 ft 9 in (1.75 m)	RS Sr	Archbishop Carroll High School; Rider	Washington, D.C.
G	11	Trinity Davis	5 ft 8 in (1.73 m)	So	Bishop McNamara High School; Tyler Junior College	Kankakee, IL
F	13	Alex Brown	6 ft 1 in (1.85 m)	So	Osbourn Park High School	Manassas, VA
F	15	Melissa Mwanza	6 ft 2 in (1.88 m)	Sr	Life Christian Academy; Louisiana Tech	Harare, Zimbabwe
F	21	Caitlin Frost	6 ft 1 in (1.85 m)	Jr	St. Bonaventure	Les Coteaux, Quebec

Head coach

- Joy McCorvey (St. John's)

Assistant coach(es)

- Anjalé Barrett (Maryland)
- Kiah Gillespie (Florida State)
- Evan Turkish (American)

Legend

- (C) Team captain
- (S) Suspended
- (I) Ineligible
- (W) Walk-on
- Injured
- Current redshirt

Roster
Last update: August 21, 2026

== Schedule and results ==
Date time, TV	Rank^{#}	Opponent^{#}	Result	Record	High points	High rebounds	High assists	Site (attendance) city, state
Exhibition
October 29, 2026*; 6:31 p.m.		Queens (NY)	W 61–56		14 – L. Philpotts	10 – L. Philpotts	3 – Tied	Stony Brook Arena (261); Stony Brook, NY
Non-conference regular season
November 2, 2026*; 4:30 p.m., FloCollege		Molloy	W 73–39	1–0	16 – Little	11 – L. Philpotts	5 – L. Philpotts	Stony Brook Arena; Stony Brook, NY
November 5, 2026*; 1:00 p.m., ESPN+		at Iona	W 77–63	2–0	23 – Little	8 – Frost	4 – Cook	Hynes Athletics Center (234); New Rochelle, NY
November 11, 2026*; 6:00 p.m., ESPN+		at Niagara	W 71-40	3-0	–	–	–	Gallagher Center (215); Lewiston, NY
November 15, 2026*; 1:00 p.m., SNY/FloCollege		Sacred Heart	W 44-33	4-0	–	–	–	Stony Brook Arena (327); Stony Brook, NY
November 21, 2026*; 1:00 p.m., ESPN+		at Duquesne						UPMC Cooper Fieldhouse; Pittsburgh, PA
November 24, 2026*; 6:31 p.m., FloCollege		Lehigh						Stony Brook Arena; Stony Brook, NY
December 2, 2026*; 6:00 p.m., ESPN+		at Vermont						Patrick Gym; Burlington, VT
December 6, 2026*; 2:00 p.m., ACCNX		at Miami (FL)						Watsco Center; Coral Gables, FL
December 8, 2026*; 11:00 a.m., ESPN+		at Florida Atlantic						Eleanor R. Baldwin Arena; Boca Raton, FL
December 14, 2026*; 6:31 p.m., SNY/FloCollege		Georgian Court						Stony Brook Arena; Stony Brook, NY
December 17, 2026*; 11:00 a.m., SNY/FloCollege		Delaware						Stony Brook Arena; Stony Brook, NY
December 22, 2026*; 1:00 p.m., ACCNX		at Virginia						John Paul Jones Arena; Charlottesville, VA
CAA regular season
January 1, 2027; 2:00 p.m., SNY/FloCollege		Towson						Stony Brook Arena; Stony Brook, NY
January 3, 2027; 1:00 p.m., SNY/FloCollege		Hofstra						Stony Brook Arena; Stony Brook, NY
January 8, 2027; 7:00 p.m., FloCollege		at North Carolina A&T						Corbett Sports Center; Greensboro, NC
January 10, 2027; 1:00 p.m., FloCollege		at Elon						Schar Center; Elon, NC
January 15, 2027; 6:00 p.m., FloCollege		at Drexel						Daskalakis Athletic Center; Philadelphia, PA
January 17, 2027; 1:00 p.m., SNY/FloCollege		Campbell						Stony Brook Arena; Stony Brook, NY
January 22, 2027; 6:00 p.m., FloCollege		at Monmouth						OceanFirst Bank Center; West Long Branch, NJ
January 29, 2027; 6:31 p.m., FloCollege		Northeastern						Stony Brook Arena; Stony Brook, NY
January 31, 2027; 1:00 p.m., SNY/FloCollege		Drexel						Stony Brook Arena; Stony Brook, NY
February 5, 2027; 6:00 p.m., FloCollege		at Charleston						TD Arena; Charleston, SC
February 7, 2027; 1:00 p.m., FloCollege		at UNC Wilmington						Trask Coliseum; Wilmington, NC
February 12, 2027; 1:00 p.m., SNY/FloCollege		Hampton						Stony Brook Arena; Stony Brook, NY
February 14, 2027; 1:00 p.m., FloCollege		at Towson						SECU Arena; Towson, MD
February 19, 2027; 6:31 p.m., FloCollege		Charleston						Stony Brook Arena; Stony Brook, NY
February 21, 2027; 1:00 p.m., SNY/FloCollege		Monmouth						Stony Brook Arena; Stony Brook, NY
February 26, 2027; 7:00 p.m., FloCollege		at Northeastern						Cabot Center; Boston, MA
March 4, 2027; 6:00 p.m., FloCollege		at Hofstra						Mack Sports Complex; Hempstead, NY
March 6, 2027; 1:00 p.m., FloCollege		William & Mary						Stony Brook Arena; Stony Brook, NY
CAA tournament
March 10–14, 2027; TBA, FloCollege		vs.						CareFirst Arena; Washington, D.C.
*Non-conference game. ^{#}Rankings from AP Poll. (#) Tournament seedings in parentheses. All times are in Eastern.
