= 2026–27 SMU Mustangs women's basketball team =

American college basketball season

2026–27 SMU Mustangs women's basketball
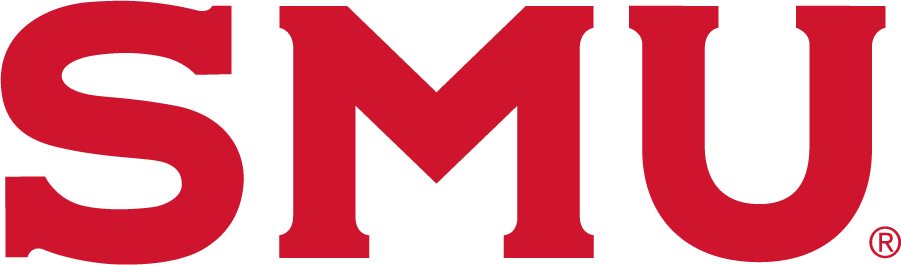
- Conference: Atlantic Coast Conference
- Record: 4–0 (0–0 ACC)
- Head coach: Adia Barnes (2nd season)
- Assistant coaches: Salvo Coppa; Coquese Washington; Anthony Turner; Amy Pryor
- Home arena: Moody Coliseum

2026–27 ACC women's basketball standings
	Conf.				Overall
Team	W		L	PCT	W		L	PCT
Florida State	0	–	0	–	4	–	0	1.000
No. 7 Louisville	0	–	0	–	4	–	0	1.000
SMU	0	–	0	–	4	–	0	1.000
Virginia	0	–	0	–	4	–	0	1.000
California	0	–	0	–	3	–	0	1.000
Clemson	0	–	0	–	3	–	0	1.000
Miami (FL)	0	–	0	–	3	–	0	1.000
No. 13 Notre Dame	0	–	0	–	3	–	0	1.000
Pittsburgh	0	–	0	–	3	–	0	1.000
Syracuse	0	–	0	–	3	–	0	1.000
Virginia Tech	0	–	0	–	3	–	0	1.000
Wake Forest	0	–	0	–	3	–	0	1.000
No. 5 Duke	0	–	0	–	2	–	0	1.000
NC State	0	–	0	–	3	–	1	.750
Georgia Tech	0	–	0	–	2	–	1	.667
Stanford	0	–	0	–	2	–	1	.667
Boston College	0	–	0	–	1	–	2	.333
No. 23 North Carolina	0	–	0	–	1	–	2	.333
† 2027 ACC tournament winner As of November 13, 2026; Rankings from AP Poll

The 2026–27 SMU Mustangs women's basketball team currently represents Southern Methodist University during the 2026–27 NCAA Division I women's basketball season. The Mustangs, led by second-year head coach Adia Barnes and play their home games at Moody Coliseum in University Park, Texas, (Note: University Park and its neighbor of Highland Park form an enclave within Dallas known as the Park Cities. All locations within the Park Cities have a Dallas mailing address.) and compete as a member of the Atlantic Coast Conference.

== Previous season ==
The Mustangs finished the 2025–26 season 9–21 overall and 2–16 in ACC play, to finish sixteenth in the conference. They failed to qualify for the ACC tournament for the second straight year since joining the conference in 2024.

== Offseason ==
=== Departures ===
SMU departures
Name	Num.	Pos.	Height	Year	Hometown	Reason for departure
Ayanna Thompson	1	Guard	6'1"	Senior	DeSoto, TX	Graduated
Tyi Skinner	3	Guard	5'5"	Graduate student	Washington, D.C.	Transferred to Syracuse
Anaya Brown	4	Forward	6'1"	Senior	Lexington, KY	Graduated
Jazzy Gipson	6	Forward	6'0"	Freshman	Albuquerque, NM	Transferred to Florida Atlantic
Grace Hall	7	Forward	6'2"	(redshirt) Senior	Homewood, IL	Graduated
Sahnya Jah	11	Forward	6'0"	Junior	Alexandria, VA	Transferred to Cincinnati
Kyla Deck	12	Guard	5'9"	Senior	Frisco, TX	Graduated
Jzaniya Harriel	21	Guard	5'10"	(redshirt) Senior	Sacramento, CA	Graduated
Elizaveta Filchagina	22	Forward	6'2"	Freshman	Moscow, Russia	Transferred to Washington State
Paulina Paris	23	Guard	5'9"	Senior	Congers, NY	Graduated
Miriam Ibezim	33	Forward	6'2"	Senior	Rochester, NY	Graduated

=== Incoming transfers ===
SMU incoming transfers
Name	Num.	Pos.	Height	Year	Hometown	Previous school
Izela Arenas	0	Guard	5'8"	Junior	Los Angeles, CA	Kansas State
Theresa Hagans Jr.	1	Guard	5'9"	Sophomore	Utica, NY	Pittsburgh
Kinsea Grimes	12	Forward	6'0"	Sophomore	Mansfield, TX	Coastal Carolina
Grace Ezebilo	22	Forward	6'1"	Senior	Anambra, Nigeria	Charleston

=== Recruiting class ===
College recruiting
Name	Hometown	School	Height	Weight	Commit date
Shania James; PG	North Chicago, IL	Example Academy	5 ft 6 in (1.68 m)	N/A	
Shania James; PG	Recruit ratings: Rivals: ESPN: (93)				
Zoe Osby; W	Bladensburg, MD	Elizabeth Seton High School	6 ft 0 in (1.83 m)	N/A	
Zoe Osby; W	Recruit ratings: ESPN: (91)				
Overall recruit ranking:
Note: In many cases, Scout, Rivals, 247Sports, On3, and ESPN may conflict in their listings of height and weight.; In these cases, the average was taken. ESPN grades are on a 100-point scale.; Sources: "2026 Player Commits". ESPN. Archived from the original on August 13, 2026.

== Roster ==
Years are listed according to the new NCAA age-based eligibility model.

2026–27 SMU Mustangs women's basketball team
Players
Coaches

Pos.	#	Name	Height	Year	Previous school	Hometown
G	0	Izela Arenas	5 ft 8 in (1.73 m)	Jr	Sierra Canyon School; Kansas State	Los Angeles, CA
G	1	Theresa Hagans Jr.	5 ft 9 in (1.75 m)	So	Bishop Ireton High School; Pittsburgh	Utica, NY
G	2	Zahra King	5 ft 10 in (1.78 m)	Jr	Westtown School; California	Brooklyn, NY
G	4	Shania James	5 ft 6 in (1.68 m)	Fr	Example Academy	North Chicago, IL
F	5	Zoe Osby	6 ft 1 in (1.85 m)	Fr	Elizabeth Seton High School	Bladensburg, MD
F	12	Kinsea Grimes	6 ft 0 in (1.83 m)	So	Lake Ridge High School; Coastal Carolina	Mansfield, TX
G	13	Mailien Rolf	5 ft 10 in (1.78 m)	Jr	Bertolt-Brecht-Schule; Arizona	Roßdorf, Germany
F	17	Adja Kane	6 ft 3 in (1.91 m)	Fr	Landerneau Bretagne Basket	Olivet, France
C	19	Camille Nesmith	6 ft 3 in (1.91 m)	Fr	St. John's College High School	Washington, D.C.
G	20	Elise Hill	5 ft 7 in (1.7 m)	Sr	Holland Hall; Tulsa	Tulsa, OK
F	21	Kaylin Jackson	6 ft 2 in (1.88 m)	Fr	Denton Ryan High School	Denton, TX
F	22	Grace Ezebilo	6 ft 1 in (1.85 m)	Sr	Charleston	Anambra, Nigeria
F	42	Roxy White	5 ft 11 in (1.8 m)	So	Example Academy	Frankfort, IL

Head coach

- Adia Barnes (Arizona)

Assistant coach(es)

- Salvo Coppa (IULM University of Milan)
- Coquese Washington (Notre Dame)
- Anthony Turner (Colorado)
- Amy Pryor (Oklahoma Bapist)

Legend

- (C) Team captain
- (S) Suspended
- (I) Ineligible
- (W) Walk-on
- Injured
- Current redshirt

Roster
Last update: August 13, 2026

== Schedule and results ==
Date time, TV	Rank^{#}	Opponent^{#}	Result	Record	High points	High rebounds	High assists	Site (attendance) city, state
Exhibition
October 21, 2026*; 6:00 p.m.		West Texas A&M	W 83–60		17 – King	12 – Jackson	6 – Hagans Jr.	Moody Coliseum (840); University Park, TX
October 27, 2026*; 6:30 p.m.		UNT Dallas	W 143–41		20 – Tied	13 – Ezebilo	7 – James	Moody Coliseum (864); University Park, TX
Regular season
November 3, 2026*; 6:30 p.m., ACCNX		Le Moyne	W 72–36	1–0	16 – Hagans Jr.	9 – Ezebilo	2 – Tied	Moody Coliseum (943); University Park, TX
November 5, 2026*; 11:00 a.m., ACCNX		Hampton	W 66–54	2–0	18 – Ezebilo	19 – Ezebilo	7 – Hagans Jr.	Moody Coliseum (3,356); University Park, TX
November 8, 2026*; 6:00 p.m., ACCNX		East Texas A&M	W 78–65	3–0	30 – Hagans Jr.	10 – Ezebilo	7 – James	Moody Coliseum (1,012); University Park, TX
November 11, 2026*; 6:00 p.m., ACCNX		LIU	W 69–50	4–0	20 – Hagans Jr.	8 – Kane	6 – Hagans Jr.	Moody Coliseum (847); University Park, TX
November 15, 2026*; 6:00 p.m., ACCNX		Nicholls						Moody Coliseum; University Park, TX
November 17, 2026*; 6:30 p.m., ESPN+		at Kansas State						Bramlage Coliseum; Manhattan, KS
November 21, 2026*; 5:00 p.m., ACCNX		Grand Canyon						Moody Coliseum; University Park, TX
November 23, 2026*; 6:00 p.m.		vs. Saint Mary's; Hoopfest Basketball Women's Challenge						Comerica Center; Frisco, TX
November 25, 2026*; 3:00 p.m.		vs. Memphis; Hoopfest Basketball Women's Challenge						Comerica Center; Frisco, TX
November 29, 2026; 5:00 p.m., ACC Network		Virginia						Moody Coliseum; University Park, TX
December 2, 2026*; 8:15 p.m., ACC Network		Georgia; ACC–SEC Challenge						Moody Coliseum; Dallas, TX
December 6, 2026; 1:00 p.m., ACCNX		at Syracuse						JMA Wireless Dome; Syracuse, NY
December 9, 2026*; 6:30 p.m., ESPN+		at Tulsa						Reynolds Center; Tulsa, OK
December 18, 2026*; 6:30 p.m., ACCNX		Coppin State						Moody Coliseum; University Park, TX
December 20, 2026*; 3:00 p.m., ACC Network		UTSA						Moody Coliseum; University Park, TX
December 23, 2026*; 12:00 p.m., ACCNX		Incarnate Word						Moody Coliseum; University Park, TX
December 31, 2027; 12:00 p.m., ACCNX		at Wake Forest						LJVM Coliseum; Winston-Salem, NC
January 3, 2027; 2:00 p.m., ACCNX		Stanford						Moody Coliseum; University Park, TX
January 7, 2027; 5:00 p.m., ACCNX		at Boston College						Conte Forum; Chestnut Hill, MA
January 10, 2027; 1:00 p.m., ACCNX		at Pittsburgh						Petersen Events Center; Pittsburgh, PA
January 14, 2027; 6:00 p.m., ACCNX		Clemson						Moody Coliseum; University Park, TX
January 21, 2027; 6:00 p.m., ACCNX		at Georgia Tech						McCamish Pavilion; Atlanta, GA
January 24, 2027; 1:00 p.m., The CW		Louisville						Moody Coliseum; University Park, TX
January 28, 2027; 6:30 p.m., ACCNX		NC State						Moody Coliseum; University Park, TX
January 31, 2027; 11:00 a.m., ACC Network		at Miami (FL)						Watsco Center; Coral Gables, FL
February 4, 2027; 7:00 p.m., ACC Network		Notre Dame						Purcell Pavilion; South Bend, IN
February 7, 2027; 2:00 p.m., ACCNX		Pittsburgh						Moody Coliseum; University Park, TX
February 11, 2027; 5:00 p.m., ACCNX		at Virginia Tech						Cassell Coliseum; Blacksburg, VA
February 14, 2027; 1:00 p.m., ACCNX		North Carolina						Moody Coliseum; University Park, TX
February 21, 2027; 2:00 p.m., ACCNX		California						Moody Coliseum; University Park, TX
February 25, 2027; 5:00 p.m., ACC Network		Duke						Moody Coliseum; University Park, TX
February 28, 2027; 1:00 p.m., ACCNX		at Florida State						Donald L. Tucker Civic Center; Tallahassee, FL
*Non-conference game. ^{#}Rankings from AP Poll. (#) Tournament seedings in parentheses. All times are in Central.
