= 2026–27 Pittsburgh Panthers women's basketball team =

Intercollegiate basketball season

2026–27 Pittsburgh Panthers women's basketball
- Conference: Atlantic Coast Conference
- Record: 6–0 (0–0 ACC)
- Head coach: Robin Harmony (1st season)
- Associate head coach: Randy Javier Schneider
- Assistant coaches: Greg Long; Madison Taylor
- Home arena: Petersen Events Center

2026–27 ACC women's basketball standings
	Conf.				Overall
Team	W		L	PCT	W		L	PCT
No. 3 Louisville	0	–	0	–	7	–	0	1.000
California	0	–	0	–	6	–	0	1.000
Florida State	0	–	0	–	6	–	0	1.000
Miami (FL)	0	–	0	–	6	–	0	1.000
Virginia	0	–	0	–	6	–	0	1.000
No. 5 Duke	0	–	0	–	5	–	0	1.000
No. 13 Notre Dame	0	–	0	–	5	–	0	1.000
Pittsburgh	0	–	0	–	5	–	0	1.000
Virginia Tech	0	–	0	–	5	–	0	1.000
Clemson	0	–	0	–	6	–	1	.857
Georgia Tech	0	–	0	–	5	–	1	.833
NC State	0	–	0	–	5	–	1	.833
SMU	0	–	0	–	5	–	1	.833
Syracuse	0	–	0	–	4	–	1	.800
Boston College	0	–	0	–	4	–	2	.667
Stanford	0	–	0	–	4	–	2	.667
Wake Forest	0	–	0	–	4	–	2	.667
No. 24 North Carolina	0	–	0	–	3	–	2	.600
† 2027 ACC tournament winner As of November 22, 2026; Rankings from AP Poll

The 2026–27 Pittsburgh Panthers women's basketball team currently represents the University of Pittsburgh during the 2025–26 NCAA Division I women's basketball season. The Panthers, led by first-year head coach Robin Harmony, play their home games at the Petersen Events Center in Pittsburgh, Pennsylvania and compete as a member of the Atlantic Coast Conference (ACC).

== Previous season ==
The Panthers finished the 2025–26 season 8–23 overall and 1–17 in ACC play, to finish in a tie for last in the conference with Boston College. They failed to qualify for the ACC tournament.

On March 3, 2026, head coach Tory Verdi was fired after three seasons, in which he posted a 29–66 record. The decision came weeks after six former players came forward and filed a Title IX violation lawsuit against Verdi and the university in February over allegations of abusive coaching methods, as well as a failure to investigate reports of abuse after they were reported to university administrators.

Charleston head coach Robin Harmony was announced as the program's new head coach on March 23. In the previous season, she led the Cougars to their best record in program history (27–6), as well as their first ever CAA title and NCAA tournament bid.

== Offseason ==
=== Departures ===
Pittsburgh departures
Name	Number	Pos.	Height	Year	Hometown	Reason for departure
Divine Tumba Tshibuabua	0	Forward	6'2"	Freshman	Longueil, QC	Transferred to West Virginia
Theresa Hagans Jr.	1	Guard	5'9"	Freshman	Utica, NY	Transferred to SMU
Amiya Jenkins	2	Guard	5'10"	(redshirt) Junior	Lexington, KY	Graduated
Nylah Wilson	3	Guard	5'9"	Freshman	Chester, VA	Transferred to West Virginia
Jada Queeley	5	Guard	5'10"	Freshman	Edmonton, AB	Transferred to San Francisco
Carla Viegas	8	Guard	5'9"	Junior	Malaga, Spain	Transferred to Duquesne
Angela Le Faou	10	Forward	6'5"	Freshman	Bordeaux, France	Transferred to Loyola Chicago
Angel Jones	11	Guard	5'4"	Senior	Woodbridge, VA	Transferred to Hofstra
Lauren Rust	13	Forward	6'0"	(redshirt) Sophomore	Victoria, British Columbia	Transferred to Belmont
Raeven Boswell	14	Guard	5'11"	Junior	Austin, TX	Transferred to Southern Illinois (Note: Did not play in the 2025–26 season; not listed on roster.)
Megan Hollingsworth	15	Guard	6'0"	Freshman	Ottawa, ON	Transferred to Boston College
Fatima Diakhate	21	Forward	6'5"	(redshirt) Junior	Dakar, Senegal	Transferred to Rutgers
Audrey Biggs	22	Guard	6'0"	Sophomore	Catlettsburg, KY	Transferred to Miami (OH)
Mikayla Johnson	23	Guard	6'1"	(redshirt) Junior	Anchorage, AK	Transferred to UCF

=== Incoming transfers ===
Pittsburgh incoming transfers
Name	Number	Pos.	Height	Year	Hometown	Previous school
Taylor Barbot	0	Guard	5'9"	Senior	Floral Park, NY	Charleston
Maysen Hill	1	Guard	5'11"	Sophomore	South Kingstown, RI	Fordham
Jazmyne Bynum	2	Guard	5'7"	Sophomore	Chicago, IL	Miami Dade (NJCAA)
Taryn Barbot	5	Guard	5'10"	Senior	Floral Park, NY	Charleston
Jamisen Hill	7	Guard	5'11"	Senior	South Kingstown, RI	Charleston
Avery Watkins	11	Forward	6'2"	Graduate student	Seattle, WA	Fresno State
CeCe Legaspi	17	Guard	5'10"	Junior	Meridian, ID	California Baptist
Ande'a Cherisier	21	Center	6'1"	Senior	Baltimore, MD	Delaware
Alancia Ramsey	32	Forward	6'1"	Senior	Delray Beach, FL	Alabama
Meredith Venner	35	Center	6'3"	Sophomore	San Andrés, Colombia	Miami Dade (NJCAA)

=== Recruiting class ===
There was no 2026 recruiting class.

== Roster ==
2026–27 Pittsburgh Panthers women's basketball team
Players
Coaches

Pos.	#	Name	Height	Year	Previous school	Hometown
G	0	Taylor Barbot	5 ft 9 in (1.75 m)	Sr	St. Mary's High School; Charleston	Floral Park, NY
G	1	Maysen Hill	5 ft 11 in (1.8 m)	So	St. Andrews High School; Fordham	South Kingstown, RI
G	2	Jazmyne Bynum	5 ft 7 in (1.7 m)	So	Hyde Park Academy High School; Miami Dade College	hicago, IL
G	3	Madison Crawford	5 ft 6 in (1.68 m)	Fr	Mansfield Legacy High School	Mansfield, TX
G	5	Taryn Barbot	5 ft 10 in (1.78 m)	Sr	St. Mary's High School; Charleston	Floral Park, NY
G	7	Jamisen Hill	5 ft 11 in (1.8 m)	Sr	St. Andrews High School; Charleston	South Kingstown, RI
F	11	Avery Watkins	6 ft 2 in (1.88 m)	GS	Kennedy Catholic High School; Fresno State	Seattle, WA
G	17	CeCe Legaspi	5 ft 10 in (1.78 m)	Jr	Rocky Mountain High School; California Baptist	Meridian, ID
C	21	Ande'a Cherisier	6 ft 1 in (1.85 m)	Sr	Saint Frances Academy; Delaware	Baltimore, MD
G	25	Macie Arzner	5 ft 11 in (1.8 m)	So	McMinnville High School	McMinnville, OR
F	32	Alancia Ramsey	6 ft 1 in (1.85 m)	Sr	St. Thomas Aquinas High School; Alabama	Delray Beach, FL
C	35	Meredith Venner	6 ft 3 in (1.91 m)	So	Academy of Central Florida; Miami Dade College	San Andrés, Colombia

Head coach

- Robin Harmony (Miami (FL))

Assistant coach(es)

- Randy Javier Schneider (FIU)
- Greg Long (Delta State)
- Madison Taylor (College of Charleston)

Legend

- (C) Team captain
- (S) Suspended
- (I) Ineligible
- (W) Walk-on
- Injured
- Current redshirt

Roster
Last update: August 11, 2026

== Schedule and results ==
Date time, TV	Rank^{#}	Opponent^{#}	Result	Record	High points	High rebounds	High assists	Site (attendance) city, state
Regular season
November 3, 2026*; 7:00 p.m., ACCNX		Saint Peter's	W 81–52	1–0	25 – Tar. Barbot	9 – Venner	7 – Tay. Barbot	Petersen Events Center (615); Pittsburgh, PA
November 7, 2026*; 2:00 p.m., ACCNX		LIU	W 92–42	2–0	29 – Tar. Barbot	11 – Venner	8 – Tay. Barbot	Petersen Events Center (695); Pittsburgh, PA
November 10, 2026*; 7:00 p.m., ACCNX		Delaware State	W 129–51	3–0	23 – Arzner	8 – Ramsey	11 – Tay. Barbot	Petersen Events Center (589); Pittsburgh, PA
November 14, 2026*; 12:00 p.m., ACCNX		Charleston Southern						Petersen Events Center; Pittsburgh, PA
November 18, 2026*; 11:00 a.m., ACCNX		UMBC						Petersen Events Center; Pittsburgh, PA
November 21, 2026*; 2:00 p.m., ACCNX		Canisius						Petersen Events Center; Pittsburgh, PA
November 28, 2026*; TBA, ACCNX		vs. Harvard; Christmas City Classic opening round						Stabler Arena; Bethlehem, PA
November 29, 2026*; 12:00 p.m. or 2:30 p.m., ACCNX		vs. Liberty or Lehigh; Christmas City Classic						Stabler Arena; Bethlehem, PA
December 6, 2026*; 2:00 p.m., ACCNX		Sacred Heart						Petersen Events Center; Pittsburgh, PA
December 13, 2026; 2:00 p.m., ACCNX		at Georgia Tech						McCamish Pavilion; Atlanta, GA
December 17, 2026*; 7:00 p.m., ACCNX		Mercyhurst						Petersen Events Center; Pittsburgh, PA
December 20, 2026*; 12:00 p.m., ACCNX		Duquesne; City Game						Petersen Events Center; Pittsburgh, PA
December 28, 2026; 7:00 p.m., ACCNX		Notre Dame						Petersen Events Center; Pittsburgh, PA
December 31, 2026; 2:00 p.m., ACCNX		Virginia Tech						Petersen Events Center; Pittsburgh, PA
January 3, 2027; 2:00 p.m., ACCNX		at Wake Forest						LJVM Coliseum; Winston-Salem, NC
January 7, 2027; 6:00 p.m., ACCNX		at Syracuse						JMA Wireless Dome; Syracuse, NY
January 10, 2027; 2:00 p.m., ACCNX		SMU						Petersen Events Center; Pittsburgh, PA
January 14, 2027; 7:00 p.m., ACCNX		Louisville						Petersen Events Center; Pittsburgh, PA
January 21, 2027; 6:00 p.m., ACCNX		at Florida State						Donald L. Tucker Civic Center; Tallahassee, FL
January 24, 2027; 2:00 p.m., ACCNX		Virginia						Petersen Events Center; Pittsburgh, PA
January 28, 2027; 6:00 p.m., ACCN		Clemson						Petersen Events Center; Pittsburgh, PA
January 31, 2027; 2:00 p.m., ACCNX		Boston College						Petersen Events Center; Pittsburgh, PA
February 4, 2027; 7:00 p.m., ACCNX		at NC State						Reynolds Coliseum; Raleigh, NC
February 7, 2027; 3:00 p.m., ACCNX		at SMU						Moody Coliseum; University Park, TX
February 14, 2027; 12:00 p.m., ACCNX		at Duke						Cameron Indoor Stadium; Durham, NC
February 18, 2027; 6:00 p.m., ACCN		North Carolina						Petersen Events Center; Pittsburgh, PA
February 21, 2027; 2:00 p.m., ACCNX		Miami (FL)						Petersen Events Center; Pittsburgh, PA
February 25, 2027; 10:00 p.m., ACCNX		at Stanford						Maples Pavilion; Stanford, CA
February 28, 2027; 2:00 p.m., ACCN		at California						Haas Pavilion; Berkeley, CA
*Non-conference game. ^{#}Rankings from AP Poll. (#) Tournament seedings in parentheses. All times are in Eastern.
