= 2026–27 Charleston Cougars women's basketball team =

American college basketball season

2026–27 Charleston Cougars women's basketball
- Conference: Coastal Athletic Association
- Record: 2–2 (0–0 CAA)
- Head coach: Amanda Butler (1st season)
- Associate head coach: Darrick Gibbs
- Assistant coaches: Chelsey Rhodes; James Spinelli
- Home arena: TD Arena

2026–27 CAA women's basketball standings
	Conf.				Overall
Team	W		L	PCT	W		L	PCT
Stony Brook	0	–	0	–	3	–	0	1.000
Hofstra	0	–	0	–	2	–	1	.667
Monmouth	0	–	0	–	2	–	1	.667
Northeastern	0	–	0	–	2	–	1	.667
UNC Wilmington	0	–	0	–	2	–	1	.667
William & Mary	0	–	0	–	2	–	1	.667
Charleston	0	–	0	–	2	–	2	.500
Drexel	0	–	0	–	1	–	2	.333
Elon	0	–	0	–	1	–	2	.333
Hampton	0	–	0	–	1	–	2	.333
North Carolina A&T	0	–	0	–	1	–	2	.333
Towson	0	–	0	–	1	–	2	.333
Campbell	0	–	0	–	0	–	4	.000
† 2027 CAA tournament winner As of November 14, 2026

The 2026–27 Charleston Cougars women's basketball team currently represents the College of Charleston during the 2025–26 NCAA Division I women's basketball season. The Cougars, led by first-year head coach Amanda Butler, play their home games at TD Arena in Charleston, South Carolina and compete as a member of the Coastal Athletic Association.

== Previous season ==
The Cougars finished the 2025–26 season a program-best 27–6 overall and 16–2 in CAA play, finishing as conference regular season champions for the first time in program history.

As the top seed in the CAA tournament, they narrowly avoided an upset to No. 8 William & Mary as they won 58–55 in the quarterfinals. They routed No. 4 Stony Brook in the semifinals 79–49 and advanced to the championship game, where they defeated No. 10 Hofstra 68–56 to claim their first ever conference title and NCAA tournament bid.

In the NCAA tournament, the Cougars were seeded No. 14 in the Sacramento #2 Regional. They lost in the first round to No. 3 seeded Duke 64–81 to end their season.

On March 23, 2026, three days after their NCAA tournament elimination, it was announced that head coach Robin Harmony would be stepping down from the program after seven seasons to accept a head coaching job at Pittsburgh. On April 1, Louisville assistant coach Amanda Butler was announced as the program's ninth head coach.

== Offseason ==
=== Departures ===
Charleston departures
Name	Num	Pos.	Height	Year	Hometown	Reason for departure
Taylor Barbot	0	Guard	5'9"	Junior	Floral Park, NY	Transferred to Pittsburgh
Leah Philpotts	1	Guard	5'8"	Sophomore	New Haven, CT	Transferred to Stony Brook
Marissa Brown	3	Guard	6'0"	Senior	Fort Walton Beach, FL	Graduated
Taryn Barbot	5	Guard	5'10"	Junior	Floral Park, NY	Transferred to Pittsburgh
Sophia Tougas	6	Guard	6'1"	(redshirt) Senior	Glens Falls, NY	Graduated
Jami Hill	7	Guard	5'11"	Junior	Kingston, RI	Transferred to Pittsburgh
Naylee Cortes	9	Wing	5'10"	Senior	Bogotá, Colombia	Transferred to UNC Wilmington
Alana Philpotts	10	Guard	5'8"	(redshirt) Freshman	New Haven, CT	Transferred to Stony Brook
Danielle McTeer	11	Forward	6'0"	(redshirt) Senior	Hampton, VA	Graduated
Chynell Mitchell	21	Forward	6'1"	Graduate student	Austin, TX	Entered transfer portal
Grace Ezebilo	22	Forward	6'1"	Junior	Nando, Nigeria	Transferred to SMU

=== Incoming transfers ===
Charleston incoming transfers
Name	Num	Pos.	Height	Year	Hometown	Previous school
Abby Jegede	2	Guard	5'10"	(redshirt) Senior	Toronto, Ontario	Tulsa
Mia James	3	Guard	5'4"	Sophomore	Dacula, GA	George Washington
Isla Juffermans	13	Forward	6'4"	(redshirt) Sophomore	Coffs Harbour, Australia	Louisville

=== Recruiting class ===
There was no 2026 recruiting class.

== Preseason ==
On October 15, 2026, the CAA released its annual preseason coaches poll and awards. Charleston was picked to finish eighth in the conference.

=== Preseason rankings ===
CAA Preseason Coaches Poll
Place	Team	Votes
1	Monmouth	144 (12)
2	Elon	116
3	Drexel	109
4	William & Mary	108 (1)
5	Towson	99
6	North Carolina A&T	89
7	Stony Brook	88
8	Charleston	71
9	Hofstra	56
10	Hampton	51
11	Northeastern	35
12	Campbell	30
13	UNC Wilmington	18
(#) first-place votes

=== Preseason All-CAA Teams ===
Preseason All-CAA Teams
Player	Year	Position	Team
Tyja Beans	Senior	Guard	First

=== CAA Preseason Honorable Mentions ===
CAA Preseason Honorable Mentions
Player	Year	Position
Abby Jegede	(redshirt) Senior	Guard

== Roster ==
2026–27 Charleston Cougars women's basketball team
Players
Coaches

Pos.	#	Name	Height	Year	Previous school	Hometown
G	0	Aubrey Stevenson	5 ft 7 in (1.7 m)	So	Rock Hill High School	Rock Hill, SC
G	1	Camila De Pool	5 ft 7 in (1.7 m)	So	Lake Highland Prep; Fordham	Carolina, PR
G	2	Abby Jegede	5 ft 10 in (1.78 m)	RS Sr	King's Christian Collegiate; Tulsa	Toronto, Ontario
G	3	Mia James	5 ft 4 in (1.63 m)	So	Hebron Christian Academy; George Washington	Dacula, GA
G	5	Janna Vogelaar	6 ft 0 in (1.83 m)	Fr		Bronckhorst, Netherlands
G	11	Dakara Merthie	5 ft 9 in (1.75 m)	Fr	Ocoee High School	Deltona, FL
F	12	Chanel Ndi	6 ft 0 in (1.83 m)	Fr	Deutschhaus-Gymnasium	Würzburg, Germany
F	13	Isla Juffermans	6 ft 4 in (1.93 m)	RS So	Centre of Excellence Australia; Louisville	Coffs Harbour, Australia
G	15	Tyja Beans	5 ft 11 in (1.8 m)	Sr	Spruce Creek High School; Western Carolina	Daytona Beach, FL
G	20	Anilys Rolon	5 ft 9 in (1.75 m)	So	Dr. Phillips High School	Orlando, FL
G	22	Maggie Spell	5 ft 9 in (1.75 m)	Fr	Thomas Jefferson High School	Pittsburgh, PA

Head coach

- Amanda Butler (Florida)

Assistant coach(es)

- Darrick Gibbs (Wofford)
- Chelsey Rhodes (Delta State)
- James Spinelli (Temple)

Legend

- (C) Team captain
- (S) Suspended
- (I) Ineligible
- (W) Walk-on
- Injured
- Current redshirt

Roster
Last update: July 24, 2026

== Schedule and results ==
Date time, TV	Rank^{#}	Opponent^{#}	Result	Record	High points	High rebounds	High assists	Site (attendance) city, state
Exhibition
September 27, 2026*; 4:00 p.m., ESPN+		South Carolina; TheLinkU Invitational	L 60–91		11 – Beans	5 – Tied	3 – Vogelaar	Credit One Stadium; Charleston, SC
Non-conference regular season
November 2, 2026*; 5:00 p.m., FloCollege		Berry	W 92–43	1–0	20 – Merthie	16 – Juffermans	4 – Tied	TD Arena (443); Charleston, SC
November 7, 2026*; 1:00 p.m., FloCollege		Charleston Southern	W 71–54	2–0	19 – Rolon	9 – Vogelaar	4 – Rolon	TD Arena (439); Charleston, SC
November 10, 2026*; 10:30 p.m., BTN		at No. 3 USC	L 44–105	2–1	12 – Juffermans	6 – Juffermans	4 – Tied	Galen Center (3,870); Los Angeles, CA
November 12, 2026*; 2:00 p.m.		at California	L 64–78	2–2	22 – Juffermans	8 – Juffermans	4 – Vogelaar	Haas Pavilion (4,915); Berkeley, CA
November 18, 2026*; 7:00 p.m.		at Queens						Curry Arena; Charlotte, NC
November 26, 2026*; 1:00 p.m.		vs. McNeese; St. Pete Showcase						McArthur Center; St. Petersburg, FL
November 27, 2026*; 12:00 p.m.		vs. Boston College; St. Pete Showcase						McArthur Center; St. Petersburg, FL
December 2, 2026*; TBA, FloCollege		LaGrange						TD Arena; Charleston, SC
December 12, 2026*; TBA, FloCollege		Coastal Carolina						TD Arena; Charleston, SC
December 15, 2026*; TBA		at Georgia Southern						Hill Convocation Center; Statesboro, GA
December 20, 2026*; TBA		Richmond						TD Arena; Charleston, SC
December 28, 2026*; TBA		at Virginia Tech						Cassell Coliseum; Blacksburg, VA
CAA regular season
January 3, 2027; TBA, FloCollege		Monmouth						TD Garden; Charleston, SC
January 8, 2027; TBA, FloCollege		at Hampton						Hampton Convocation Center; Hampton, VA
January 10, 2027; TBA, FloCollege		at William & Mary						Kaplan Arena; Williamsburg, VA
January 15, 2027; TBA, FloCollege		North Carolina A&T						TD Arena; Charleston, SC
January 17, 2027; TBA, FloCollege		Northeastern						TD Arena; Charleston, SC
January 22, 2027; TBA, FloCollege		at Drexel						Daskalakis Athletic Center; Philadelphia, PA
January 24, 2027; TBA, FloCollege		at Monmouth						OceanFirst Bank Center; Philadelphia, PA
January 24, 2027; TBA, FloCollege		UNC Wilmington						TD Arena; Charleston, SC
January 31, 2027; TBA, FloCollege		at Elon						Schar Center; Elon, NC
February 5, 2027; TBA, FloCollege		Stony Brook						TD Arena; Charleston, SC
February 7, 2027; TBA, FloCollege		Towson						TD Arena; Charleston, SC
February 12, 2027; TBA, FloCollege		at Campbell						Gore Arena; Buies Creek, NC
February 19, 2027; TBA, FloCollege		at Stony Brook						Stony Brook Arena; Stony Brook, NY
February 21, 2027; TBA, FloCollege		at Hofstra						Mack Sports Complex; Hempstead, NY
February 26, 2027; TBA, FloCollege		Campbell						TD Arena; Charleston, SC
February 28, 2027; TBA, FloCollege		at UNC Wilmington						Trask Coliseum; Wilmington, NC
March 4, 2027; TBA, FloCollege		Hampton						TD Arena; Charleston, SC
March 6, 2027; TBA, FloCollege		Elon						TD Arena; Charleston, SC
CAA tournament
March 10–14, 2027; TBA, FloCollege		vs.						CareFirst Arena; Washington, D.C.
*Non-conference game. ^{#}Rankings from AP Poll. (#) Tournament seedings in parentheses. All times are in Eastern.
