= 2026–27 Campbell Fighting Camels women's basketball team =

American college basketball season

2026–27 Campbell Fighting Camels women's basketball
- Conference: Coastal Athletic Association
- Record: 1–6 (0–0 CAA)
- Head coach: Ali Jaques (1st season)
- Assistant coaches: Moriah Crisp; Danielle Ball
- Home arena: Gore Arena

2026–27 CAA women's basketball standings
	Conf.				Overall
Team	W		L	PCT	W		L	PCT
Stony Brook	0	–	0	–	4	–	0	1.000
Monmouth	0	–	0	–	4	–	1	.800
UNC Wilmington	0	–	0	–	3	–	1	.750
Charleston	0	–	0	–	3	–	2	.600
Elon	0	–	0	–	3	–	2	.600
William & Mary	0	–	0	–	3	–	2	.600
Towson	0	–	0	–	3	–	3	.500
Hofstra	0	–	0	–	2	–	2	.500
Northeastern	0	–	0	–	2	–	2	.500
Drexel	0	–	0	–	2	–	3	.400
North Carolina A&T	0	–	0	–	2	–	3	.400
Hampton	0	–	0	–	1	–	4	.200
Campbell	0	–	0	–	1	–	5	.167
† 2027 CAA tournament winner As of November 21, 2026

The 2026–27 Campbell Fighting Camels women's basketball team currently represents Campbell University during the 2026–27 NCAA Division I women's basketball season. The Fighting Camels, led by first-year head coach Ali Jaques, play their home games at Gore Arena in Buies Creek, North Carolina and compete as a member of the Coastal Athletic Association.

== Previous season ==
The Fighting Camels finished the 2025–26 season 20–12 overall and 13–5 in CAA play, to finish in a tie for second in the conference with Drexel. As the No. 2 seed in the CAA tournament, they earned a double-bye to the quarterfinals, where they lost 50–55 in a surprise upset by eventual tournament runners-up No. 10 Hofstra.

On April 27, 2026, it was announced by university athletic director Hannah Bazemore that head coach Ronny Fisher had resigned after ten seasons with the program to pursue other opportunities. On May 15, Rhode Island associate head coach Ali Jaques was named as the team's new head coach. Jaques helped lead the Rams to a 28–5 record, as well as their first A-10 title in program history and their first NCAA tournament appearance since 1996.

== Offseason ==
=== Departures ===
Campbell departures
Name	Num.	Pos.	Height	Year	Hometown	Reason for departure
Ashleigh Battle	1	Guard	5'2"	Junior	Fort Lauderdale, FL	Transferred to Charleston Southern
Keaton Rikard	2	Guard	5'7"	Freshman	Raleigh, NC	Entered transfer portal (Note: Did not play in the 2025–26 season.)
N'na Konate	10	Forward	6'3"	Freshman	Lausanne, Switzerland	Transferred to George Washington
Olivia Tucker	11	Guard	5'7"	Sophomore	Durham, NC	Transferred to St. John's
Hadleigh Dill	12	Guard	6'0"	Junior	Candler, NC	Graduated
Jasmine Nivar	20	Guard	5'10"	Freshman	Apex, NC	Transferred to Florida State
Logan Nuckols	21	Guard	5'6"	Senior	Rockville, VA	Graduated
Gianni Boone	22	Guard	5'11"	Senior	Washington, D.C.	Graduated
Ciara Alexander	32	Guard	6'0"	Sophomore	Atlanta, GA	Transferred to Furman

=== Incoming transfers ===
Campbell incoming transfers
Name	Num.	Pos.	Height	Year	Hometown	Previous school
Kiaya Davis	7	Guard	5'9"	Junior	Little Rock, AR	Connors State College (NJCAA)

=== Recruiting class ===
There was no 2026 recruiting class.

== Preseason ==
On October 15, 2026, the CAA released its annual preseason coaches poll and awards. Campbell was picked to finish twelfth in the conference.

=== Preseason rankings ===
CAA Preseason Coaches Poll
Place	Team	Votes
1	Monmouth	144 (12)
2	Elon	116
3	Drexel	109
4	William & Mary	108 (1)
5	Towson	99
6	North Carolina A&T	89
7	Stony Brook	88
8	Charleston	71
9	Hofstra	56
10	Hampton	51
11	Northeastern	35
12	Campbell	30
13	UNC Wilmington	18
(#) first-place votes

=== Preseason All-CAA Teams ===
Preseason All-CAA Teams
Player	Year	Position	Team
Jasmine Felton	Junior	Guard	Second

=== CAA Preseason Honorable Mentions ===
No players were named CAA Preseason Honorable Mentions.

== Roster ==
2026–27 Campbell Fighting Camels women's basketball team
Players
Coaches

Pos.	#	Name	Height	Year	Previous school	Hometown
G	0	Jessica Woods	5 ft 7 in (1.7 m)	Sr	Westwood High School	Columbia, SC
F	1	Genesis Schneeberg	5 ft 10 in (1.78 m)	Fr	Sidwell Friends School	Lorton, VA
G	3	Durusah Bilen	5 ft 9 in (1.75 m)	Fr	Istanbul Anakent High School	İzmir, Turkey
G/F	4	Clara Comas	5 ft 11 in (1.8 m)	Fr	IES CTEIB	Ciutadella de Menorca, Spain
F	5	Mikayla Taborn	6 ft 3 in (1.91 m)	Jr	Franklinton High School	Youngsville, NC
G/F	6	Amit Arieli	5 ft 11 in (1.8 m)	Fr	Dror High School	Tsur Moshe, Israel
G	7	Kiaya Davis	5 ft 9 in (1.75 m)	Jr	Little Rock Central High School; Connors State College	Little Rock, AK
G	9	Emerson Thompson	5 ft 10 in (1.78 m)	Jr	Falls Lake Academy	Butner, North Carolina
F	11	Hana Predojevic	6 ft 1 in (1.85 m)	Fr	Nikola Tesla Banja Luka	Laktasi, Bosnia and Herzegovina
G	17	Laura Martín	5 ft 9 in (1.75 m)	Fr	Colegio San Antonio de Padua	Cáceres, Spain
F	20	Mariam Traore	6 ft 1 in (1.85 m)	Fr	Samuel de Champlain	Bondy, France
G	23	Jasmine Felton	5 ft 11 in (1.8 m)	Jr	Northeastern High School	Elizabeth City, NC
F	24	Peris Smith	6 ft 2 in (1.88 m)	Sr	North Augusta High School	Graniteville, SC
F	32	Emma Carter	6 ft 4 in (1.93 m)	Fr	Oak City Prep	Apex, NC

Head coach

- Ali Jaques (NYU)

Assistant coach(es)

- Moriah Crisp (UNC Wilmington)
- Danielle Ball (Richmond)

Legend

- (C) Team captain
- (S) Suspended
- (I) Ineligible
- (W) Walk-on
- Injured
- Current redshirt

Roster
Last update: August 19, 2026

== Schedule and results ==
Date time, TV	Rank^{#}	Opponent^{#}	Result	Record	High points	High rebounds	High assists	Site (attendance) city, state
Non-conference regular season
November 2, 2026*; 6:00 p.m., FloCollege		Austin Peay	L 47–62	0–1	20 – Felton	11 – Felton	3 – Felton	Gore Arena (780); Buies Creek, NC
November 4, 2026*; 6:00 p.m., ACCN		at No. 25 NC State	L 45–80	0–2	11 – Predojovic	7 – Predojovic	2 – Tied	Reynolds Coliseum (4,912); Raleigh, NC
November 8, 2026*; 1:00 p.m., ESPN+		at Davidson	L 43–80	0–3	15 – Felton	10 – Schneeberg	2 – Tied	John M. Belk Arena (859); Davidson, NC
November 11, 2026*; 6:00 p.m., FloCollege		Radford	L 56–83	0–4	19 – Felton	9 – Schneeberg	2 – Tied	Gore Arena (822); Buies Creek, NC
November 14, 2026*; 2:00 p.m., FloCollege		Furman	W 64–58	1–4	25 – Felton	9 – Felton	3 – Felton	Gore Arena (973); Buies Creek, NC
November 17, 2026*; 6:00 p.m., FloCollege		Fordham	L 70−72	1−5	21 – Felton	7 – Felton	2 – Tied	Gore Arena (873); Buies Creek, NC
November 20, 2026*; 6:00 p.m., MEAC Network		at Norfolk State	L 53–59	1–6	12 – Predojevic	8 – Schneeberg	4 – Woods	Echols Hall (257); Norfolk, VA
November 25, 2026*; 6:00 p.m., ESPN+		at Mercer						Hawkins Arena; Macon, GA
November 29, 2026*; 2:00 p.m., FloCollege		Coastal Carolina						Gore Arena; Buies Creek, NC
December 2, 2026*; TBA, FloCollege		Western Kentucky						Gore Arena; Buies Creek, NC
December 13, 2026*; 5:00 p.m., ACCNX		at Virginia Tech						Cassell Coliseum; Blacksburg, VA
December 17, 2026*; 11:00 a.m., ESPN+		at East Carolina						Williams Arena at Minges Coliseum; Greenville, NC
December 19, 2026*; 12:00 p.m., FloCollege		USC Upstate						Gore Arena; Buies Creek, NC
December 22, 2026*; 11:00 a.m., ESPN+		at Richmond						Robins Center; Richmond, VA
CAA regular season
January 1, 2027; 1:00 p.m., FloCollege		at William & Mary						Kaplan Arena; Williamsburg, VA
January 3, 2027; 2:00 p.m., FloCollege		Hampton						Gore Arena; Buies Creek, NC
January 8, 2027; 6:00 p.m., FloCollege		Drexel						Gore Arena; Buies Creek, NC
January 15, 2027; 6:30 p.m., FloCollege		at Towson						SECU Arena; Towson, MD
January 17, 2027; 1:00 p.m., FloCollege		at Stony Brook						Stony Brook Arena; Stony Brook, NY
January 22, 2027; 6:00 p.m., FloCollege		Elon						Gore Arena; Buies Creek, NC
January 24, 2027; 1:00 p.m., FloCollege		at UNC Wilmington						Trask Coliseum; Wilmington, NC
January 29, 2027; 6:00 p.m., FloCollege		William & Mary						Gore Arena; Buies Creek, NC
January 31, 2027; 2:00 p.m., FloCollege		Monmouth						Gore Arena; Buies Creek, NC
February 5, 2027; 7:00 p.m., FloCollege		at Northeastern						Cabot Center; Boston, MA
February 7, 2027; 1:00 p.m., FloCollege		at Hofstra						Mack Sports Complex; Hempstead, NY
February 12, 2027; 6:00 p.m., FloCollege		Charleston						Gore Arena; Buies Creek, NC
February 14, 2027; 2:00 p.m., FloCollege		North Carolina A&T						Gore Arena; Buies Creek, NC
February 21, 2027; 2:00 p.m., FloCollege		Northeastern						Gore Arena; Buies Creek, NC
February 26, 2027; 6:00 p.m., FloCollege		at Charleston						TD Arena; Charleston, SC
February 28, 2027; 2:00 p.m., FloCollege		at North Carolina A&T						Corbett Sports Center; Greensboro, NC
March 4, 2027; 7:00 p.m., FloCollege		at Elon						Schar Center; Elon, NC
March 6, 2027; 2:00 p.m., FloCollege		UNC Wilmington						Gore Arena; Buies Creek, NC
CAA tournament
March 10–14, 2027; TBA, FloCollege		vs.						CareFirst Arena; Washington, D.C.
*Non-conference game. ^{#}Rankings from AP Poll. (#) Tournament seedings in parentheses. All times are in Eastern.
