= North Carolina A&T Aggies women's basketball =

2026–27 North Carolina A&T Aggies women's basketball team
- University: North Carolina A&T State University
- Head coach: Tarrell Robinson (15th season)
- Location: Greensboro, North Carolina
- Arena: Corbett Sports Center (capacity: 5,700)
- Conference: Coastal Athletic Association
- Nickname: Aggies
- Colors: Blue and gold

NCAA Division I tournament appearances
- 1994, 2009, 2016, 2018, 2021

Conference tournament champions
- 1994, 2009, 2016, 2018, 2021

Conference regular-season champions
- 1988, 1989, 1990, 2008, 2009, 2010, 2016, 2018, 2019, 2025

The North Carolina A&T Aggies women's basketball team represents North Carolina A&T State University in Greensboro, North Carolina, United States. The team currently competes in the Coastal Athletic Association.

== Postseason results ==
=== NCAA appearances ===
North Carolina A&T has appeared in the NCAA Division I women's basketball tournament five times. The Aggies have a record of 0–5.

Year	Seed	Round	Opponent	Result
1994	#16	First round	#1 Tennessee	L 37–111
2009	#14	First round	#3 Florida State	L 71–83
2016	#16	First round	#1 Notre Dame	L 61–95
2018	#15	First round	#2 South Carolina	L 52–63
2021	#16	First round	#1 NC State	L 58–71

=== WBIT appearances ===
The Lady Aggies have appeared in the Women's Basketball Invitation Tournament one time. The Lady Aggies have a 0-1 record in the tournament.

Year	Seed	Round	Opponent	Result
2025	-	First round	#1 Virginia Tech	L 48-61

=== WNIT appearances ===
The Lady Aggies have appeared in the Women's National Invitation Tournament 5 times. The team has a 4-5 record in the tournament

Year	Round	Opponent	Result
2008	First Round	South Carolina	L 74–102
2010	First Round; Second Round; Regional Semifinals	Wake Forest; Charlotte; Miami	W 73–49; W 79–70; L 77–84
2013	First Round	James Madison	L 64-77
2014	First Round	South Carolina	L 50–56
2024	First Round; Second Round; Super 16	UNCG; Old Dominion; Troy	W 56-51; W 48-45; L 75-89
