= 2026–27 North Florida Ospreys women's basketball team =

American college basketball season

2026–27 North Florida Ospreys women's basketball
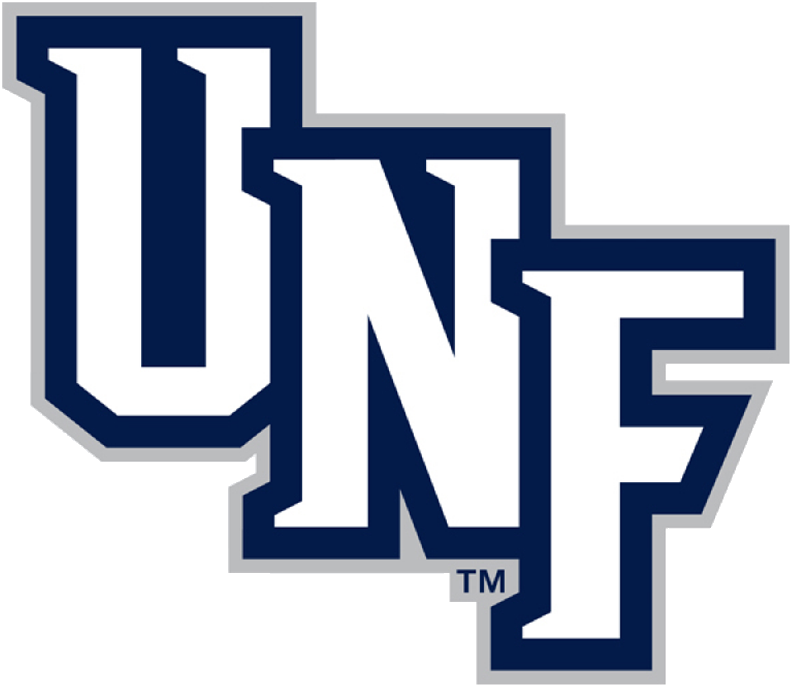
- Conference: Atlantic Sun Conference
- Record: 5–2 (0–0 ASUN)
- Head coach: Erika Lambert (4th season)
- Associate head coach: Stacey Ungashick Lobdell
- Assistant coaches: Chris Dixon; Gadiva Hubbard; Jayla Adams
- Home arena: UNF Arena

2026–27 ASUN women's basketball standings
| | Conf. | | | | Overall |
| Team | W | | L | PCT | W | | L | PCT |
|---|---|---|---|---|---|---|---|---|
| North Florida | 0 | – | 0 | – | 5 | – | 2 | .714 |
| Florida Gulf Coast | 0 | – | 0 | – | 4 | – | 2 | .667 |
| Jacksonville | 0 | – | 0 | – | 3 | – | 2 | .600 |
| West Florida* | 0 | – | 0 | – | 3 | – | 3 | .500 |
| Lipscomb | 0 | – | 0 | – | 2 | – | 3 | .400 |
| Queens | 0 | – | 0 | – | 2 | – | 3 | .400 |
| Bellarmine | 0 | – | 0 | – | 2 | – | 5 | .286 |
| Stetson | 0 | – | 0 | – | 1 | – | 5 | .167 |
† 2027 ASUN tournament winner * ineligible for the 2027 NCAA tournament due to transition from Division II; As of November 21, 2026

The 2026–27 North Florida Ospreys women's basketball team will represent the University of North Florida during the 2026–27 NCAA Division I women's basketball season. The Ospreys, led by fourth-year head coach Erika Lambert, will play their home games at UNF Arena in Jacksonville, Florida, and compete as a member of the Atlantic Sun Conference.

== Previous season ==
The Ospreys finished the 2025–26 season 9–21 overall and 4–14 in ASUN play, finishing in a tie for tenth in the conference with Queens. As the No. 10 seed in the ASUN tournament, they lost 71–76 in overtime in the first round to No. 7 seed West Georgia to end their season.

== Offseason ==
=== Departures ===
North Florida departures
| Name | Num | Pos. | Height | Year | Hometown | Reason for departure |
|---|---|---|---|---|---|---|
| Claire Davis | 2 | Forward | 6'1" | Senior | Atlanta, GA | Graduated |
| Soraya Ogaldez | 3 | Guard | 5'8" | Freshman | Lacey, WA | Transferred to Howard CC (NJCAA) |
| Sarah Taub | 4 | Guard | 5'9" | Senior | Marietta, GA | Transferred to McNeese (Note: Did not play in the 2025–26 season.) |
| Megan Verbeeten | 8 | Guard | 5'8" | Freshman | Crawley, England | TBD; not listed on roster |
| Jadah Toombs | 12 | Guard | 5'6" | Sophomore | Immokalee, FL | TBD; not listed on roster |
| Jordan Brooks | 34 | Center | 6'3" | Graduate student | Victorville, CA | Graduated |
| Nicole Carreno | 35 | Forward | 5'10" | Sophomore | Riverview, FL | Transferred to Flagler (D-II) |

=== Incoming transfers ===
North Florida incoming transfers
| Name | Num | Pos. | Height | Year | Hometown | Previous school |
|---|---|---|---|---|---|---|
| Brianna Mead | 2 | Guard | 5'7" | Junior | Thompson, CT | Temple |
| Mya Mayberry | 5 | Guard | 5'7" | Junior | Wichita, KS | Butler CC (NJCAA) |
| Brooke Winchester | 12 | Forward | 6'0" | Sophomore | Warsaw, IN | Ball State |

=== Recruiting class ===
There was no 2026 recruiting class.

== Preseason ==
On October 27, 2026, the ASUN released its annual preseason poll and honor awards. North Florida was picked to finish fifth in the conference.

=== Preseason rankings ===
ASUN Preseason Poll
| Place | Team | Votes |
|---|---|---|
| T-1 | Jacksonville | 58 (4) |
| T-1 | Florida Gulf Coast | 58 (3) |
| 3 | Lipscomb | N/A |
| 4 | Stetson | N/A |
| 5 | North Florida | N/A |
| 6 | Queens | N/A (1) |
| 7 | West Florida | N/A |
| 8 | Bellarmine | N/A |
(#) first-place votes

=== Preseason All-ASUN Team ===
Preseason All-ASUN Team
| Player | Year | Position |
|---|---|---|
| Alonya Waldon | Senior | Guard |

== Roster ==
Years are listed according to the new NCAA age-based eligibility model.

2026–27 North Florida Ospreys women's basketball team
Players
Coaches

| Pos. | # | Name | Height | Year | Previous school | Hometown |
|---|---|---|---|---|---|---|
| G | 0 | Jamison Cardwell | 5 ft 9 in (1.75 m) | So | Gainesville High School | Gainesville, FL |
| G | 1 | Jamisyn Stinson | 5 ft 11 in (1.8 m) | Jr | Sheridan High School | Thornville, OH |
| G | 2 | Brianna Mead | 5 ft 7 in (1.7 m) | Jr | Putnam Science Academy; Temple | Thompson, CT |
| G | 4 | Alonya Waldon | 5 ft 5 in (1.65 m) | Sr | Palm Bay Magnet High School; Samford | Melbourne, FL |
| G | 5 | Mya Mayberry | 5 ft 7 in (1.7 m) | Jr | Wichita Heights High School; Butler CC | Wichita, KS |
| F | 9 | Belle Ratliff | 6 ft 2 in (1.88 m) | Fr | Byron Nelson High School | Roanoke, TX |
| F | 12 | Brooke Winchester | 6 ft 0 in (1.83 m) | So | Warsaw Community High School; Ball State | Warsaw, IN |
| G | 14 | Abby Knauff | 5 ft 9 in (1.75 m) | So | The Bolles School | Jacksonville, FL |
| F | 20 | Georgi Buzzetti (5th) | 6 ft 2 in (1.88 m) | Sr | Colegio Ausonia; Florida SouthWestern State College | Buenos Aires, Argentina |
| G | 22 | Alexa Washington | 5 ft 6 in (1.68 m) | Sr | Oakland Catholic High School | Monroeville, FL |
| G | 23 | Elle Blatchford | 5 ft 9 in (1.75 m) | Sr | Sequoyah High School; Gardner–Webb | Canton, GA |
| G/F | 24 | Karyzma Pierre | 6 ft 0 in (1.83 m) | Sr | Oak Ridge High School; Palm Beach Atlantic | Orlando, FL |
| F | 30 | Dezuray McGill | 6 ft 1 in (1.85 m) | So | American Heritage Schools | Miami, FL |

Head coach

- Erika Lambert (College of Charleston)

Assistant coach(es)

- Stacey Ungashick Lobdell (Florida Southern)
- Chris Dixon (Armstrong State)
- Gadiva Hubbard (Minnesota)
- Jayla Adams (North Florida)

Legend

- (C) Team captain
- (S) Suspended
- (I) Ineligible
- (W) Walk-on
- (5th) Fifth-year senior
- Injured
- Current redshirt

Roster
Last update: July 19, 2026

== Schedule and results ==
| Date time, TV | Rank^{#} | Opponent^{#} | Result | Record | High points | High rebounds | High assists | Site (attendance) city, state |
Exhibition
| October 27, 2026*; TBA | | Florida Southern | | | | | | UNF Arena; Jacksonville, FL |
Non-conference regular season
| November 2, 2026* | | Florida Tech | Cancelled | | | | | UNF Arena; Jacksonville, FL |
| November 5, 2026*; 11:00 a.m., ACCNX | | at Florida State | L 63–74 | 0–1 | 16 – McGill | 7 – Stinson | 5 – Mead | Donald L. Tucker Civic Center; Tallahassee, FL |
| November 7, 2026*; 12:30 p.m., ESPN+ | | Palm Beach Atlantic | W 93–76 | 1–1 | 19 – Waldon | 8 – Ratliff | 4 – Waldon | UNF Arena (447); Jacksonville, FL |
| November 10, 2026*; 11:00 a.m., ESPN+ | | Edward Waters | W 70–43 | 2–1 | 13 – Winchester | 10 – Buzzetti | 4 – Mead | UNF Arena (3,135); Jacksonville, FL |
| November 12, 2026*; 8:00 p.m., ESPN+ | | at Little Rock | W 71–64 | 3–1 | 16 – Ratliff | 8 – Ratliff | 4 – Waldon | Jack Stephens Center (424); Little Rock, AR |
| November 14, 2026*; 2:00 p.m., ESPN+ | | at Central Arkansas | W 71–70 ^{OT} | 4–1 | 17 – Waldon | 10 – Ratliff | 2 – Tied | Farris Center (732); Conway, AR |
| November 17, 2026*; 11:00 a.m., ESPN+ | | at UCF | L 64–82 | 4–2 | 15 – Mead | 5 – Tied | 4 – Washington | Addition Financial Arena (1,141); Orlando, FL |
| November 19, 2026*; 6:00 p.m., SWAC TV | | at Bethune–Cookman | W 57–47 | 5–2 | 14 – Waldon | 7 – McGill | 3 – Mayberry | Moore Gymnasium (479); Daytona Beach, FL |
| November 27, 2026*; 1:30 p.m. | | South Dakota; North Florida Invitational | | | | | | UNF Arena; Jacksonville, FL |
| November 28, 2026*; 1:30 p.m. | | North Carolina A&T; North Florida Invitational | | | | | | UNF Arena; Jacksonville, FL |
| December 4, 2026*; 7:00 p.m. | | South Alabama | | | | | | UNF Arena; Jacksonville, FL |
| December 6, 2026*; 2:45 p.m. | | at Florida | | | | | | O'Connell Center; Gainesville, FL |
| December 12, 2026*; 4:00 p.m. | | Coastal Georgia | | | | | | UNF Arena; Jacksonville, FL |
| December 16, 2026*; 12:30 p.m. | | at Texas Tech | | | | | | United Supermarkets Arena; Lubbock, TX |
| December 19, 2026*; 2:00 p.m. | | at Florida Atlantic; FIU Holiday Classic | | | | | | Eleanor R. Baldwin Arena; Boca Raton, FL |
| December 20, 2026*; 12:00 p.m. | | vs. SIU Edwardsville; FIU Holiday Classic | | | | | | Eleanor R. Baldwin Arena; Boca Raton, FL |
| December 29, 2026*; 2:00 p.m. | | Tarleton State | | | | | | UNF Arena; Jacksonville, FL |
| December 31, 2026*; 2:00 p.m. | | Abilene Christian | | | | | | UNF Arena; Jacksonville, FL |
| January 2, 2027*; 2:00 p.m. | | UT Arlington | | | | | | UNF Arena; Jacksonville, FL |
ASUN regular season
| January 9, 2027; 2:00 p.m., ESPN+ | | at Jacksonville | | | | | | Swisher Gymnasium; Jacksonville, FL |
| January 14, 2027; 7:00 p.m., ESPN+ | | Bellarmine | | | | | | UNF Arena; Jacksonville, FL |
| January 16, 2027; 2:00 p.m., ESPN+ | | Lipscomb | | | | | | UNF Arena; Jacksonville, FL |
| January 21, 2027; 7:00 p.m., ESPN+ | | at West Florida | | | | | | PenAir Field House; Pensacola, FL |
| January 23, 2027; 2:00 p.m., ESPN+ | | at Queens | | | | | | Curry Arena; Charlotte, NC |
| January 28, 2027; 5:00 p.m., ESPN+ | | Stetson | | | | | | UNF Arena; Jacksonville, FL |
| January 30, 2027; 2:00 p.m., ESPN+ | | Florida Gulf Coast | | | | | | UNF Arena; Jacksonville, FL |
| February 6, 2027; 2:00 p.m., ESPN+ | | Jacksonville | | | | | | UNF Arena; Jacksonville, FL |
| February 11, 2027; 7:00 p.m., ESPN+ | | at Lipscomb | | | | | | Allen Arena; Nashville, TN |
| February 13, 2027; 2:00 p.m., ESPN+ | | at Bellarmine | | | | | | Knights Hall; Louisville, KY |
| February 18, 2027; 7:00 p.m., ESPN+ | | Queens | | | | | | UNF Arena; Jacksonville, FL |
| February 20, 2027; 2:00 p.m., ESPN+ | | West Florida | | | | | | UNF Arena; Jacksonville, FL |
| February 25, 2027; 5:00 p.m., ESPN+ | | at Florida Gulf Coast | | | | | | Alico Arena; Fort Myers, FL |
| February 27, 2027; 1:00 p.m., ESPN+ | | at Stetson | | | | | | Insight Credit Union Arena; DeLand, FL |
ASUN tournament
| March 4–8, 2027; TBA | | vs. | | | | | | VyStar Veterans Memorial Arena; Jacksonville, FL |
*Non-conference game. ^{#}Rankings from AP Poll. (#) Tournament seedings in parentheses. All times are in Eastern.
