= 2026–27 West Florida Argonauts women's basketball team =

American college basketball season

2026–27 West Florida Argonauts women's basketball
- Conference: Atlantic Sun Conference
- Record: 3–3 (0–0 ASUN)
- Head coach: Stephanie Lawrence Yelton (15th season)
- Assistant coaches: Ashley Brown; Moriah Taylor; John Motherwell
- Home arena: PenAir Field House

2026–27 ASUN women's basketball standings
| | Conf. | | | | Overall |
| Team | W | | L | PCT | W | | L | PCT |
|---|---|---|---|---|---|---|---|---|
| North Florida | 0 | – | 0 | – | 5 | – | 2 | .714 |
| Florida Gulf Coast | 0 | – | 0 | – | 4 | – | 2 | .667 |
| Jacksonville | 0 | – | 0 | – | 3 | – | 2 | .600 |
| West Florida* | 0 | – | 0 | – | 3 | – | 3 | .500 |
| Lipscomb | 0 | – | 0 | – | 2 | – | 3 | .400 |
| Queens | 0 | – | 0 | – | 2 | – | 3 | .400 |
| Bellarmine | 0 | – | 0 | – | 2 | – | 5 | .286 |
| Stetson | 0 | – | 0 | – | 1 | – | 5 | .167 |
† 2027 ASUN tournament winner * ineligible for the 2027 NCAA tournament due to transition from Division II; As of November 21, 2026

The 2026–27 West Florida Argonats women's basketball team currently represents the University of West Florida during the 2026–27 NCAA Division I women's basketball season. The Argonauts, led by fifteenth-year head coach Stephanie Lawrence Yelton, play their home games at the PenAir Field House in Pensacola, Florida and compete as a first-year member of the Atlantic Sun Conference (ASUN).

This season marks the first year of West Florida's three-year transition period from Division II to Division I, which they officially became a member of on July 1, 2026. As a result, they will not be eligible to participate in the NCAA tournament until the 2029–30 season.

== Previous season ==
The Argonauts finished the 2025–26 season 18–12 overall and 13–9 in GSC play, finishing in a tie for sixth in the conference with Valdosta State. As the No. 7 seed in the GSC tournament, were eliminated in the quarterfinals 61–69 by eventual winners No. 2 seeded Union to end their season.

This was their final season as a Division II member, as the university announced the transition to Division I on April 1, effective July 1, and joined the Atlantic Sun Conference.

== Offseason ==
=== Departures ===
West Florida departures
| Name | Num | Pos. | Height | Year | Hometown | Reason for departure |
|---|---|---|---|---|---|---|
| Amelia Bell | 0 | Forward | 6'2" | Graduate student | O'Fallon, IL | Graduated, returned as director of basketball operations |
| Chloe Galombeck | 3 | Guard | 5'6" | Freshman | Charlotte, NC | Transferred to Palm Beach Atlantic (D-II) |
| Carmen Jones | 5 | Guard | 5'10" | Junior | Leonia, FL | TBD |
| Avery O'Connor | 11 | Forward | 6'0" | Senior | Dedham, MA | Graduated |
| Isabel Grimes | 12 | Guard | 5'5" | Senior | Harned, KY | Graduated |
| Jakeria Hawkins | 13 | Guard | 5'9" | Junior | Walls, MS | Transferred to Mississippi Christian (D-II) |
| Kathryn Ford | 35 | Forward | 6'1" | Freshman | Austin, TX | TBD; not listed on roster |

=== Incoming transfers ===
West Florida incoming transfers
| Name | Num | Pos. | Height | Year | Hometown | Previous school |
|---|---|---|---|---|---|---|
| Nia Coleman | 0 | Guard | 5'8" | Senior | San Ramon, CA | Mississippi Christian (D-II) |
| Kenzie Wyman | 5 | Guard | 5'7" | Sophomore | Marietta, GA | Columbus State (D-II) |
| Zaiha Minnis | 11 | Guard-forward | 5'10" | Graduate student | Clinton, MD | Saint Francis (PA) |
| Sinaya Gibson | 12 | Forward | 6'0" | Junior | Tuscaloosa, AL | Wallace State CC (NJCAA) |
| Kendall Lacoste | 13 | Guard | 5'8" | Graduate student | Livingston, AL | West Alabama (D-II) |
| Kayla Williams | 24 | Forward | 6'0" | Junior | The Bronx, NY | Northwest Florida State (NJCAA) |
| Giselle Eke | 33 | Center | 6'3" | Junior | Fort Wayne, IN | Saint Francis (PA) |

=== Recruiting class ===
There was no 2026 recruiting class.

== Preseason ==
On October 27, 2026, the ASUN released its annual preseason poll and honor awards. West Florida was picked to finish seventh in the conference.

=== Preseason rankings ===
ASUN Preseason Poll
| Place | Team | Votes |
|---|---|---|
| T-1 | Jacksonville | 58 (4) |
| T-1 | Florida Gulf Coast | 58 (3) |
| 3 | Lipscomb | N/A |
| 4 | Stetson | N/A |
| 5 | North Florida | N/A |
| 6 | Queens | N/A (1) |
| 7 | West Florida | N/A |
| 8 | Bellarmine | N/A |
(#) first-place votes

=== Preseason All-ASUN Team ===
No players were named to the Preseason All-ASUN Team.

== Roster ==
2026–27 West Florida Argonauts women's basketball team
Players
Coaches

| Pos. | # | Name | Height | Year | Previous school | Hometown |
|---|---|---|---|---|---|---|
| G | 0 | Nia Coleman | 5 ft 9 in (1.75 m) | Sr | Monte Vista High School; Mississippi Christian | San Ramon, CA |
| G | 1 | Janai Jordan | 5 ft 9 in (1.75 m) | So | Providence School | Jacksonville, FL |
| G | 2 | Annarose Tyre | 5 ft 8 in (1.73 m) | So | Lambert High School | Suwanee, GA |
| G | 4 | Kamryn Barnitz | 5 ft 6 in (1.68 m) | So | Fairland High School | Proctorville, OH |
| G | 5 | Kenzie Wyman | 5 ft 7 in (1.7 m) | So | Lassiter High School; Columbus State | Marietta, GA |
| F | 10 | Maddy Rendall | 6 ft 0 in (1.83 m) | Sr | Kamiakin High School; Oakland | Kennewick, WA |
| G/F | 11 | Zaiha Minnis | 5 ft 10 in (1.78 m) | GS | Maret School; Saint Francis (PA) | Clinton, MD |
| F | 12 | Sinaya Gibson | 6 ft 0 in (1.83 m) | Jr | Hillcrest High School; Wallace State Community College | Tuscaloosa, AL |
| G | 13 | Kendall Lacoste | 5 ft 8 in (1.73 m) | GS | University Charter School; West Alabama | Livingston, AL |
| G | 14 | Ella Mae Schepp | 5 ft 9 in (1.75 m) | So | Oceanside Collegiate Academy | Mount Pleasant, SC |
| F | 15 | Ebba Zalamans | 6 ft 0 in (1.83 m) | Sr | Bromma Gymnasium; Texas State | Stockholm, Sweden |
| F | 20 | Presley Hughes | 6 ft 0 in (1.83 m) | Fr | Madison-Ridgeland Academy | Madison, MI |
| F | 24 | Kayla Williams | 6 ft 0 in (1.83 m) | Jr | Luella High School; Northwest Florida State College | The Bronx, NY |
| F | 32 | Finley Kennedy | 5 ft 10 in (1.78 m) | So | Archbishop Hoban High School | Akron, OH |
| C | 33 | Giselle Eke | 6 ft 3 in (1.91 m) | Jr | Bishop Dwenger High School; Saint Francis (PA) | Fort Wayne, IN |

Head coach

- Stephanie Lawrence Yelton (North Carolina)

Assistant coach(es)

- Ashley Brown (West Virginia)
- Moriah Taylor (Georgia State)
- John Motherwell (Michigan)

Legend

- (C) Team captain
- (S) Suspended
- (I) Ineligible
- (W) Walk-on
- Injured
- Current redshirt

Roster
Last update: July 24, 2026

== Schedule and results ==
| Date time, TV | Rank^{#} | Opponent^{#} | Result | Record | High points | High rebounds | High assists | Site (attendance) city, state |
Non-conference regular season
| November 3, 2026*; 6:00 p.m., ESPN+ | | at East Tennessee State | L 51–73 | 0–1 | 15 – Jordan | 6 – Tyre | 4 – Kennedy | J. Madison Brooks Gymnasium (685); Johnson City, TN |
| November 5, 2026*; 5:00 p.m., ESPN+ | | at Western Carolina | L 58–72 | 0–2 | 16 – Kennedy | 5 – Tied | 4 – Tyre | Ramsey Center (481); Cullowhee, NC |
| November 9, 2026*; 10:30 a.m., ESPN+ | | Pensacola Christian | W 85–58 | 1–2 | 20 – Jordan | 8 – Tyre | 5 – Coleman | PenAir Field House (734); Pensacola, FL |
| November 11, 2026*; 5:00 p.m., ESPN+ | | at Florida State | L 58–86 | 1–3 | 19 – Tyre | 6 – Kennedy | 5 – Tyre | Donald L. Tucker Civic Center (1,012); Tallahassee, FL |
| November 15, 2026*; 1:00 p.m., ESPN+ | | Florida A&M | W 70–66 | 2–3 | 15 – Kennedy | 9 – Zalamans | 4 – Tyre | PenAir Field House (409); Pensacola, FL |
| November 18, 2026*; 6:00 p.m., ESPN+ | | Spring Hill | W 71–58 | 3–3 | 34 – Jordan | 8 – Coleman | 7 – Kennedy | PenAir Field House (216); Pensacola, FL |
| November 22, 2026*; 6:00 p.m., ESPN+ | | at Texas A&M–Corpus Christi | | | | | | Dugan Wellness Center; Corpus Christi, TX |
| November 27, 2026*; 12:00 p.m. | | vs. UT Arlington; Big Easy Classic | | | | | | Alario Center; New Orleans, LA |
| November 28, 2026*; 12:00 p.m. | | vs. Southern Illinois; Big Easy Classic | | | | | | Alario Center; New Orleans, LA |
| December 2, 2026*; 10:00 a.m., ESPN+ | | at West Georgia | | | | | | The Coliseum; Carrollton, GA |
| December 6, 2026*; 1:00 p.m., ESPN+ | | Southeastern Baptist | | | | | | PenAir Field House; Pensacola, FL |
| December 13, 2026*; 2:30 p.m., ESPN+ | | LSU New Orleans | | | | | | PenAir Field House; Pensacola, FL |
| December 19, 2026*; 1:00 p.m., ESPN+ | | West Georgia | | | | | | PenAir Field House; Pensacola, FL |
| December 21, 2026*; 6:00 p.m., ESPN+ | | North Alabama | | | | | | PenAir Field House; Pensacola, FL |
| December 28, 2026*; 6:00 p.m., ESPN+ | | UT Arlington | | | | | | PenAir Field House; Pensacola, FL |
| December 31, 2026*; 5:00 p.m., ESPN+ | | at Eastern Kentucky | | | | | | Baptist Health Arena; Richmond, KY |
| January 2, 2027*; 2:00 p.m., ESPN+ | | at Austin Peay | | | | | | F&M Bank Arena; Clarksville, TN |
ASUN regular season
| January 9, 2027; 12:00 p.m., ESPN+ | | Queens | | | | | | PenAir Field House; Pensacola, FL |
| January 14, 2027; 6:00 p.m., ESPN+ | | at Stetson | | | | | | Insight Credit Union Arena; DeLand, FL |
| January 16, 2027; 11:00 a.m., ESPN+ | | at Florida Gulf Coast | | | | | | Alico Arena; Fort Myers, FL |
| January 21, 2027; 6:00 p.m., ESPN+ | | North Florida | | | | | | PenAir Field House; Pensacola, FL |
| January 23, 2027; 1:00 p.m., ESPN+ | | Jacksonville | | | | | | PenAir Field House; Pensacola, FL |
| January 28, 2027; 6:00 p.m., ESPN+ | | at Lipscomb | | | | | | Allen Arena; Nashville, TN |
| January 30, 2027; 11:00 a.m., ESPN+ | | at Bellarmine | | | | | | Knights Hall; Louisville, KY |
| February 6, 2027; 12:00 p.m., ESPN+ | | at Queens | | | | | | Curry Arena; Charlotte, NC |
| February 11, 2027; 6:00 p.m., ESPN+ | | Florida Gulf Coast | | | | | | PenAir Field House; Pensacola, FL |
| February 13, 2027; 1:00 p.m., ESPN+ | | Stetson | | | | | | PenAir Field House; Pensacola, FL |
| February 18, 2027; 5:30 p.m., ESPN+ | | at Jacksonville | | | | | | Swisher Gymnasium; Jacksonville, FL |
| February 20, 2027; 1:00 p.m., ESPN+ | | at North Florida | | | | | | UNF Arena; Jacksonville, FL |
| February 25, 2027; 6:00 p.m., ESPN+ | | Bellarmine | | | | | | PenAir Field House; Pensacola, FL |
| February 27, 2027; 1:00 p.m., ESPN+ | | Lipscomb | | | | | | PenAir Field House; Pensacola, FL |
ASUN tournament
| March 4–8, 2027; TBA | | vs. | | | | | | VyStar Veterans Memorial Arena; Jacksonville, FL |
*Non-conference game. ^{#}Rankings from AP Poll. (#) Tournament seedings in parentheses. All times are in Central.
