= 2026–27 Florida Gulf Coast Eagles women's basketball team =

American college basketball season

2026–27 Florida Gulf Coast Eagles women's basketball
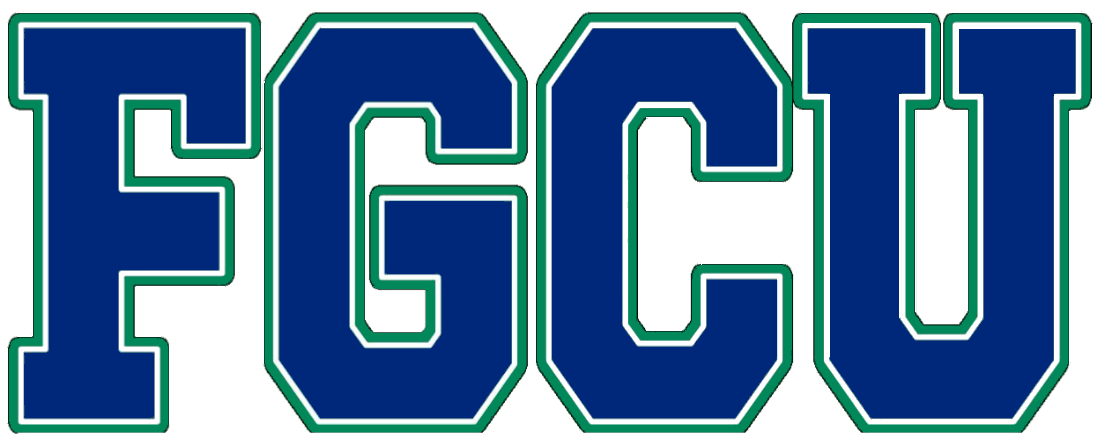
- Conference: Atlantic Sun Conference
- Record: 3–2 (0–0 ASUN)
- Head coach: Raina Harmon (2nd season)
- Assistant coaches: Janelle Silver-Martin; Will McIntire; Amber Moore; Tyler Johnson
- Home arena: Alico Arena

2026–27 ASUN women's basketball standings
	Conf.				Overall
Team	W		L	PCT	W		L	PCT
North Florida	0	–	0	–	4	–	1	.800
Florida Gulf Coast	0	–	0	–	3	–	1	.750
Jacksonville	0	–	0	–	2	–	2	.500
Queens	0	–	0	–	2	–	2	.500
Lipscomb	0	–	0	–	2	–	3	.400
West Florida*	0	–	0	–	2	–	3	.400
Bellarmine	0	–	0	–	1	–	4	.200
Stetson	0	–	0	–	1	–	4	.200
† 2027 ASUN tournament winner * ineligible for the 2027 NCAA tournament due to transition from Division II; As of November 18, 2026

The 2026–27 Florida Gulf Coast Eagles women's basketball team represents Florida Gulf Coast University during the 2026–27 NCAA Division I women's basketball season. The Eagles, led by second-year head coach Raina Harmon, plays their home games at Alico Arena in Fort Myers, Florida, as members of the Atlantic Sun Conference.

== Previous season ==
The Eagles finished the 2025–26 season 16–16 overall and 11–7 in ASUN play, finishing in a tie for fifth in the conference with North Alabama. As the No. 5 seed in the ASUN tournament, they defeated No. 12 Bellarmine in the first round 94–28, setting a record for the largest margin of victory in tournament history at 66 points. They then lost in the quarterfinals 63–70 to No. 4 Stetson, snapping an eight-season streak of conference titles for the Eagles and the first time since 2013 that they did not make the championship game.

Following the ASUN tournament, the Eagles earned and accepted an at-large bid to the WNIT, their 7th overall and first since 2016. They earned a bye to the second round, but lost 56–62 to Loyola Chicago, ending their season.

The 2025–26 season also marked the first since 2016–17 that the Eagles did not win the ASUN regular season, as well as their worst overall and conference record in program history, at .500 and .611 respectively, as a Division I school.

== Offseason ==
=== Departures ===
Florida Gulf Coast departures
Name	Num	Pos.	Height	Year	Hometown	Reason for departure
Nay Staton	0	Forward	6'0"	5th year	Jersey City, NJ	Exhausted eligibility
Mikayla Paschal	5	Forward	5'11"	Freshman	Largo, FL	Transferred to Miami Dade (NJCAA)
Maca Retamales	7	Forward	6'1"	Graduate Student	Santiago, Chile	Graduated
Jordan Campbell	23	Guard	5'9"	Senior	Purcellville, VA	Graduated
Anna Mortag	34	Forward	6'1"	Graduate Student	Milwaukee, WI	Graduated

=== Incoming transfers ===
Florida Gulf Coast incoming transfers
Name	Num	Pos.	Height	Year	Hometown	Previous school
Denika Lightbourne	0	Guard	5'9"	Senior	Nassau, Bahamas	FIU
Graca Barbosa	5	Guard	5'6"	Junior	São Paulo, Brazil	Gulf Coast State (NJCAA)
Amelia Hobson	8	Guard-Forward	6'1"	Junior	Melbourne, Australia	North Dakota State
Lily Zeinstra	10	Guard	5'11"	Junior	Byron Center, MI	Butler

=== Recruiting class ===
There was no recruiting class for 2026.

== Preseason ==
On October 27, 2026, the ASUN released its annual preseason poll and honor awards. Florida Gulf Coast was picked to finish first in the conference in a tie with Jacksonville, along with three out of eight first place votes.

=== Preseason rankings ===
ASUN Preseason Poll
Place	Team	Votes
T-1	Jacksonville	58 (4)
T-1	Florida Gulf Coast	58 (3)
3	Lipscomb	N/A
4	Stetson	N/A
5	North Florida	N/A
6	Queens	N/A (1)
7	West Florida	N/A
8	Bellarmine	N/A
(#) first-place votes

=== Preseason All-ASUN Team ===
Preseason All-ASUN Team
Player	Year	Position
Eve Alexander	Junior	Forward
Sinai Douglas	Junior	Guard
Denika Lightbourne	Senior	Guard

== Roster ==
Years are listed according to the new NCAA age-based eligibility model.

2026–27 Florida Gulf Coast Eagles women's basketball team
Players
Coaches

Pos.	#	Name	Height	Year	Previous school	Hometown
G	0	Denika Lightbourne	5 ft 9 in (1.75 m)	Sr	Tallulah Falls School; FIU	Nassau, Bahamas
G	1	Elle McCulloch	6 ft 0 in (1.83 m)	Fr	Brownsburg High School	Brownsburg, IN
G	3	Cerina Rolle (5th)	5 ft 9 in (1.75 m)	Sr	Eustis High School	Eustis, FL
G	4	Karina Gordon	5 ft 9 in (1.75 m)	Sr	St. Thomas Aquinas High School; East Carolina	Hallandale Beach, FL
G	5	Graca Barbosa	5 ft 6 in (1.68 m)	Jr	Colégio Campos Salles; Gulf Coast State College	São Paulo, Brazil
G/F	7	Ari Turla	6 ft 0 in (1.83 m)	Fr	Saint Paul Catholic High School	Scarborough, Ontario
G/F	8	Amelia Hobson	6 ft 1 in (1.85 m)	Jr	Parkdale Secondary College; North Dakota State	Melbourne, Australia
G	10	Lily Zeinstra	5 ft 11 in (1.8 m)	Jr	Byron Center High School; Buttler	Byron Center, MI
G	11	Sinai Douglas	5 ft 4 in (1.63 m)	Jr	Start High School; Michigan State	Toledo, OH
F	13	Jalei Pillow	5 ft 11 in (1.8 m)	Jr	Colonial High School; Eastern Florida State College	Columbia, TN
G	15	Shameir Quimby	5 ft 8 in (1.73 m)	Sr	Fort Walton Beach High School; Miami Dade College	Fort Walton Beach, FL
G	20	Airah Lavy	5 ft 10 in (1.78 m)	Jr	Nelsonville-York High School; Saint Francis (PA)	Nelsonville, OH
F	21	Eve Alexander	6 ft 0 in (1.83 m)	Jr	Lafayette Christian Academy; Florida A&M	Opelousas, LA

Head coach

- Raina Harmon (Central Michigan)

Assistant coach(es)

- Janelle Silver-Martin (Morgan State)
- Will McIntire (Iowa)
- Amber Moore (Saint Leo)
- Tyler Johnson (Ohio)

Legend

- (C) Team captain
- (S) Suspended
- (I) Ineligible
- (W) Walk-on
- (5th) Fifth year senior
- Injured
- Current redshirt

Roster
Last update: July 18, 2026

== Schedule and results ==
Date time, TV	Rank^{#}	Opponent^{#}	Result	Record	High points	High rebounds	High assists	Site (attendance) city, state
Non-conference regular season
November 3, 2026*; 7:00 p.m., B1G+		at Indiana	L 50–79	0–1	13 – Douglas	5 – Zeinstra	3 – Zeinstra	Simon Skjodt Assembly Hall (5,921); Bloomington, IN
November 7, 2026*; 2:00 p.m., ESPN+		Arkansas State	W 89–59	1–1	16 – Rolle	10 – Douglas	7 – Lightbourne	Alico Arena (1,110); Fort Myers, FL
November 11, 2026*; 7:00 p.m., ESPN+		Ave Maria	W 99–31	2–1	18 – Hobson	14 – Hobson	5 – Tied	Alico Arena (1,051); Fort Myers, FL
November 14, 2026*; 2:00 p.m., ESPN+		Florida Atlantic	W 86–51	3–1	21 – Zeinstra	7 – Hobson	4 – Tied	Alico Arena (1,148); Fort Myers, FL
November 17, 2026*; 7:00 p.m., SECN+		at No. 1 South Carolina	L 58–116	3–2	17 – Douglas	8 – Douglas	2 – Tied	Colonial Life Arena (16,077); Columbia, SC
November 20, 2026*; 6:00 p.m.		at Georgia Southern						Hill Convocation Center; Statesboro, GA
November 24, 2026*; 2:00 p.m., ESPN+		Fresno State						Alico Arena; Fort Myers, FL
November 27, 2026*; 6:30 p.m.		Tennessee; Coconut Hoops semifinal						Alico Arena; Fort Myers, FL
November 29, 2026*; TBD		Creighton/Houston; Coconut Hoops						Alico Arena; Fort Myers, FL
December 6, 2026*; 2:00 p.m.		at Florida A&M						Al Lawson Center; Tallahassee, FL
December 12, 2026*; 2:00 p.m.		at Appalachian State						Holmes Center; Boone, NC
December 16, 2026*; 7:00 p.m., ESPN+		George Mason						Alico Arena; Fort Myers, FL
December 19, 2026*; 3:00 p.m.		at UT Arlington						College Park Center; Arlington, TX
December 21, 2026*; 2:00 p.m.		at Abilene Christian						Moody Coliseum; Abilene, TX
December 28, 2026*; 5:00 p.m., ESPN+		New College of Florida						Alico Arena; Fort Myers, FL
December 31, 2026*; 2:00 p.m., ESPN+		Central Arkansas						Alico Arena; Fort Myers, FL
January 2, 2027*; 2:00 p.m., ESPN+		Little Rock						Alico Arena; Fort Myers, FL
January 5, 2027*; 8:00 p.m.		at Tarleton State						EECU Center; Stephenville, TX
ASUN regular season
January 9, 2027; 2:00 p.m., ESPN+		Stetson						Alico Arena; Fort Myers, FL
January 14, 2027; 7:00 p.m., ESPN+		Queens						Alico Arena; Fort Myers, FL
January 16, 2027; 12:00 p.m., ESPN+		West Florida						Alico Arena; Fort Myers, FL
January 21, 2027; 6:30 p.m.		at Bellarmine						Knights Hall; Louisville, KY
January 23, 2027; 2:00 p.m.		at Lipscomb						Allen Arena; Nashville, TN
January 28, 2027; TBA		at Jacksonville						Swisher Gymnasium; Jacksonville, FL
January 30, 2027; 2:00 p.m.		at North Florida						UNF Arena; Jacksonville, FL
February 4, 2027; 7:00 p.m., ESPN+		Lipscomb						Alico Arena; Fort Myers, FL
February 6, 2027; 4:00 p.m., ESPN+		Bellarmine						Alico Arena; Fort Myers, FL
February 11, 2027; 7:00 p.m.		at West Florida						PenAir Field House; Pensacola, FL
February 13, 2027; 2:00 p.m.		at Queens						Curry Arena; Charlotte, NC
February 20, 2027; 2:00 p.m.		at Stetson						Insight Credit Union Arena; DeLand, FL
February 25, 2027; 5:00 p.m., ESPN+		North Florida						Alico Arena; Fort Myers, FL
February 27, 2027; 1:00 p.m., ESPN+		Jacksonville						Alico Arena; Fort Myers, FL
ASUN tournament
March 4–8, 2027; TBA		vs.						VyStar Veterans Memorial Arena; Jacksonville, FL
*Non-conference game. ^{#}Rankings from AP Poll. (#) Tournament seedings in parentheses. All times are in Eastern.
