= 2026–27 Florida State Seminoles women's basketball team =

Intercollegiate basketball season

2026–27 Florida State Seminoles women's basketball
- Conference: Atlantic Coast Conference
- Record: 7–0 (0–0 ACC)
- Head coach: Brooke Wyckoff (6th season)
- Assistant coaches: Morgan Toles (7th season); Desma Thomas Bateast (4th season); Adam Surguine (7th season); Ronald Hughey (1st season); Kami Walk
- Home arena: Donald L. Tucker Civic Center

2026–27 ACC women's basketball standings
	Conf.				Overall
Team	W		L	PCT	W		L	PCT
No. 3 Louisville	0	–	0	–	7	–	0	1.000
California	0	–	0	–	6	–	0	1.000
Florida State	0	–	0	–	6	–	0	1.000
Miami (FL)	0	–	0	–	6	–	0	1.000
Virginia	0	–	0	–	6	–	0	1.000
No. 5 Duke	0	–	0	–	5	–	0	1.000
No. 13 Notre Dame	0	–	0	–	5	–	0	1.000
Pittsburgh	0	–	0	–	5	–	0	1.000
Virginia Tech	0	–	0	–	5	–	0	1.000
Clemson	0	–	0	–	6	–	1	.857
Georgia Tech	0	–	0	–	5	–	1	.833
NC State	0	–	0	–	5	–	1	.833
SMU	0	–	0	–	5	–	1	.833
Syracuse	0	–	0	–	4	–	1	.800
Boston College	0	–	0	–	4	–	2	.667
Stanford	0	–	0	–	4	–	2	.667
Wake Forest	0	–	0	–	4	–	2	.667
No. 24 North Carolina	0	–	0	–	3	–	2	.600
† 2027 ACC tournament winner As of November 22, 2026; Rankings from AP Poll

The 2026–27 Florida State Seminoles women's basketball team currently represents Florida State University during the 2026–27 NCAA Division I women's basketball season. The Seminoles, led by sixth-year head coach Brooke Wyckoff, play their home games at the Donald L. Tucker Civic Center in Tallahassee, Florida and compete as a member of the Atlantic Coast Conference (ACC).

On April 28, 2026, UConn forward Ice Brady was announced to have transferred to Florida State. However, it was also said that Brady would miss the entire 2026–27 season due to continued rehabilitation for a season-ending knee injury she suffered in November 2025, causing her to miss the rest of the Huskies' season after two games.

== Previous season ==
The Seminoles finished the 2025–26 season 10–21 overall and 5–13 in ACC play, to finish fourteenth in the conference. As the No. 14 seed in the ACC tournament, they lost in the first round to No. 11 Georgia Tech.

== Offseason ==
=== Departures ===
Florida State departures
Name	Num.	Pos.	Height	Year	Hometown	Reason for departure
Allie Kubek	0	Forward	6'2"	Graduate student	Elkton, MD	Graduated
Amaya Bonner	2	Guard	6'0"	Senior	Fremont, CA	Graduated
Jasmine Shavers	3	Guard	5'8"	Senior	Mesquite, TX	Graduated
Sydney Bowles	11	Guard	6'0"	Senior	Lithonia, GA	Graduated
Pania Davis	24	Center	6'6"	Junior	Perth, Australia	Transferred to USC

=== Incoming transfers ===
Florida State incoming transfers
Name	Num.	Pos.	Height	Year	Hometown	Previous school
Timaya Lewis-Eutsey	3	Guard	5'8"	5th year	Trenton, NJ	Marshall
Savannah Henderson	4	Forward	6'3"	5th year	Orlando, FL	Georgia
Jasmine Nivar	5	Guard	5'10"	Sophomore	Apex, NC	Campbell
Joy Egbuna	7	Forward	6'3"	Sophomore	Dallas, TX	Alabama
Aga Makurat	10	Forward	6'3"	Senior	Sierakowice, Poland	Vanderbilt
Ice Brady	25	Forward	6'3"	5th year	San Diego, CA	UConn

=== Recruiting class ===
College recruiting
Name	Hometown	School	Height	Weight	Commit date
Melissa Odom; F	Parrish, AL	Montverde Academy	6 ft 2 in (1.88 m)	N/A	
Melissa Odom; F	Recruit ratings: Rivals: 247Sports: ESPN: (96)				
Morgan Stewart; G	Columbia, MD	St. John's College High School	5 ft 11 in (1.80 m)	N/A	
Morgan Stewart; G	Recruit ratings: Rivals: 247Sports: ESPN: (95)				
Chamiah Francis; F	Pensacola, FL	Booker T. Washington High School	6 ft 2 in (1.88 m)	N/A	
Chamiah Francis; F	Recruit ratings: Rivals: 247Sports: ESPN: (93)				
Asia Lee; G	Lenexa, KS	Olathe North High School	5 ft 10 in (1.78 m)	N/A	
Asia Lee; G	Recruit ratings: Rivals: 247Sports:				
Overall recruit ranking: ESPN: 12
Note: In many cases, Scout, Rivals, 247Sports, On3, and ESPN may conflict in their listings of height and weight.; In these cases, the average was taken. ESPN grades are on a 100-point scale.; Sources: "2026 Player Commits". ESPN. Archived from the original on August 9, 2026.

== Roster ==
Years are listed according to the new NCAA age-based eligibility model.

2026–27 Florida State Seminoles women's basketball team
Players
Coaches

Pos.	#	Name	Height	Year	Previous school	Hometown
G	1	Mari Gerton	5 ft 8 in (1.73 m)	So	Princeton High School	Cincinnati, OH
G	3	Timaya Lewis-Eutsey (5th)	5 ft 8 in (1.73 m)	Sr	Life Center Academy; Marshall	Trenton, NJ
G	4	Savannah Henderson (5th)	5 ft 8 in (1.73 m)	Sr	Timber Creek High School; Georgia	Orlando, FL
G	5	Jasmine Nivar	5 ft 10 in (1.78 m)	So	Apex Friendship High School; Campbell	Apex, NC
F	7	Joy Egbuna	6 ft 3 in (1.91 m)	So	Faith Family Academy; Alabama	Dallas, TX
G	8	Asia Lee	5 ft 10 in (1.78 m)	Fr	Olathe North High School	Lenexa, KS
F	10	Aga Makurat	6 ft 3 in (1.91 m)	So	Sopocka Akademia Tenisowa; Vanderbilt	Sierakowice, Poland
F	11	Missy Odom	6 ft 2 in (1.88 m)	Fr	Montverde Academy	Parrish, AL
G	12	Emma Risch	6 ft 1 in (1.85 m)	Sr	Palm Bay Magnet High School; Notre Dame	Melbourne, FL
G	13	Tatum Greene	6 ft 3 in (1.91 m)	Jr	Saint John's Catholic Prep; Boston College	Baltimore, MD
G	15	Solé Williams	5 ft 9 in (1.75 m)	Sr	Princeton High School; Texas A&M	Cincinnati, OH
G	17	Kennedy Loux	5 ft 10 in (1.78 m)	Fr	Providence School	Jacksonville, FL
F	20	Chamiah Francis	6 ft 2 in (1.88 m)	Fr	Booker T. Washington High School	Pensacola, FL
G	24	Morgan Stewart	5 ft 11 in (1.8 m)	Fr	St. John's College High School	Columbia, MD
F	25	Ice Brady (injured) (5th)	6 ft 3 in (1.91 m)	Sr	Cathedral Catholic High School; UConn	San Diego, CA
F	32	Avery Treadwell	6 ft 3 in (1.91 m)	Sr	Bearden High School	Knoxville, TN

Head coach

- Brooke Wyckoff (Florida State)

Assistant coach(es)

- Morgan Toles (Florida State)
- Desma Thomas Bateast (Miami (FL))
- Adam Surguine (Lancaster Bible College)
- Ronald Hughey (Limestone)
- Kami Walk (Oregon)

Legend

- (C) Team captain
- (S) Suspended
- (I) Ineligible
- (W) Walk-on
- (5th) Fifth-year
- Injured
- Current redshirt

Roster
Last update: August 9, 2026

== Schedule and results ==
Date time, TV	Rank^{#}	Opponent^{#}	Result	Record	High points	High rebounds	High assists	Site (attendance) city, state
Exhibition
October 18, 2026*; 2:00 p.m.		Tampa	W 72–44		14 – Nivar	9 – Odom	4 – Stewart	Donald L. Tucker Civic Center; Tallahassee, FL
October 22, 2026*; 6:00 p.m.		Palm Beach Atlantic	W 106–40		19 – Odom	10 – Egbuna	2 – Tied	Donald L. Tucker Civic Center; Tallahassee, FL
Regular season
November 2, 2026*; 6:00 p.m., ACCNX		Merrimack	W 81–51	1–0	13 – Stewart	5 – Tied	3 – Stewart	Donald L. Tucker Civic Center (850); Tallahassee, FL
November 5, 2026*; 11:00 a.m., ACCNX		North Florida	W 74–63	2–0	21 – Stewart	9 – Tied	6 – Williams	Donald L. Tucker Civic Center; Tallahassee, FL
November 8, 2026*; 2:00 p.m., ACCNX		Florida A&M	W 101–42	3–0	17 – Greene	9 – Greene	6 – Williams	Donald L. Tucker Civic Center; Tallahassee, FL
November 11, 2026*; 6:00 p.m., ACCNX		West Florida	W 86–58	4–0	15 – Tied	7 – Greene	6 – Tied	Donald L. Tucker Civic Center (1,012); Tallahassee, FL
November 15, 2026*; 2:00 p.m., ACCNX		Florida	W 71–63	5–0	22 – Stewart	6 – Tied	5 – Williams	Donald L. Tucker Civic Center (1,777); Tallahassee, FL
November 19, 2026*; 11:00 a.m., ESPNU		vs. Purdue; WBCA Showcase	W 63–50	6–0	18 – Makurat	7 – Makurat	9 – Stewart	State Farm Field House; Orlando, FL
November 21, 2026*; 12:00 p.m., ESPN+		vs. UCF; WBCA Showcase	W 81–54	7–0	25 – Williams	8 – Makurat	5 – Williams	State Farm Field House; Orlando, FL
November 27, 2026*; 5:00 p.m., ESPN+		vs. Dayton; 4Tha Culture Holiday Hoops						Henrico Sports & Events Center; Richmond, VA
November 29, 2026*; 12:00 p.m., ESPN+		vs. VCU; 4Tha Culture Holiday Hoops						Henrico Sports & Events Center; Richmond, VA
December 3, 2026*; 7:00 p.m., ACCN		Missouri; ACC–SEC Challenge						Donald L. Tucker Civic Center; Tallahassee, FL
December 6, 2026; 12:00 p.m., ACCN		at Notre Dame						Donald L. Tucker Civic Center; Tallahassee, FL
December 13, 2026*; 2:00 p.m., ACCNX		South Alabama						Donald L. Tucker Civic Center; Tallahassee, FL
December 17, 2026; 6:00 p.m.		NC State						Donald L. Tucker Civic Center; Tallahassee, FL
December 20, 2026*; 1:00 p.m., B1G+		at Indiana						Simon Skjodt Assembly Hall; Bloomington, IN
December 31, 2026; 2:00 p.m., ACCNX		at Georgia Tech						McCamish Pavilion; Atlanta, GA
January 3, 2027; 2:00 p.m., ACCNX		at Boston College						Conte Forum; Chestnut Hill, MA
January 7, 2027; 6:00 p.m.		Louisville						Donald L. Tucker Civic Center; Tallahassee, FL
January 10, 2027; 12:00 p.m., ACCN		Syracuse						Donald L. Tucker Civic Center; Tallahassee, FL
January 17, 2027; 2:00 p.m., ACCNX		Miami						Watsco Center; Coral Gables, FL
January 21, 2027; 6:00 p.m.		Pittsburgh						Donald L. Tucker Civic Center; Tallahassee, FL
January 24, 2027; 2:00 p.m., ACCN		at Virginia Tech						Cassell Coliseum; Blacksburg, VA
January 28, 2027; 8:00 p.m., ACCN		Duke						Donald L. Tucker Civic Center; Tallahassee, FL
January 31, 2027; 2:00 p.m.		Wake Forest						Donald L. Tucker Civic Center; Tallahassee, FL
February 4, 2027; 9:00 p.m., ACCNX		at California						Haas Pavilion; Berkeley, CA
February 7, 2027; 4:00 p.m., ACCN		at Stanford						Maples Pavilion; Stanford, CA
February 11, 2027; 6:00 p.m.		Clemson						Donald L. Tucker Civic Center; Tallahassee, FL
February 14, 2027; 2:00 p.m.		Miami (FL)						Donald L. Tucker Civic Center; Tallahassee, FL
February 18, 2027; 6:30 p.m., ACCNX		at Virginia						John Paul Jones Arena; Charlottesville, VA
February 21, 2027; 12:00 p.m., The CW		at North Carolina						Carmichael Arena; Chapel Hill, NC
February 28, 2027; 2:00 p.m.		SMU						Donald L. Tucker Civic Center; Tallahassee, FL
*Non-conference game. ^{#}Rankings from AP Poll. (#) Tournament seedings in parentheses. All times are in Eastern.

== Honors ==
Player	Award	Ref.
Missy Odom	ACC Preseason All-Freshman Team	
