= 2026–27 Stetson Hatters women's basketball team =

American college basketball season

2026–27 Stetson Hatters women's basketball
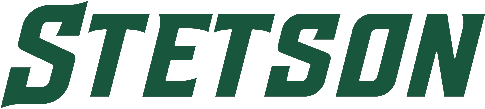
- Conference: Atlantic Sun Conference
- Record: 1–1 (0–0 ASUN)
- Head coach: Melissa DeVore (1st season)
- Assistant coaches: Reggie Mosley; Ryan McGee; Brittany Drew; Kristynn Knight
- Home arena: Insight Credit Union Arena

2026–27 ASUN women's basketball standings
	Conf.				Overall
Team	W		L	PCT	W		L	PCT
Bellarmine	0	–	0	–	1	–	1	.500
Jacksonville	0	–	0	–	1	–	1	.500
Stetson	0	–	0	–	1	–	1	.500
Florida Gulf Coast	0	–	0	–	0	–	1	.000
North Florida	0	–	0	–	0	–	1	.000
Lipscomb	0	–	0	–	0	–	2	.000
Queens	0	–	0	–	0	–	2	.000
West Florida*	0	–	0	–	0	–	2	.000
† 2027 ASUN tournament winner * ineligible for the 2027 NCAA tournament due to transition from Division II; As of November 7, 2026

The 2026–27 Stetson Hatters women's basketball team currently represents Stetson University during the 2025–26 NCAA Division I women's basketball season. The Hatters, led by first-year head coach Melissa DeVore, play their home games at the Insight Credit Union Arena in DeLand, Florida, and compete as a member of the Atlantic Sun Conference.

== Previous season ==
The Hatters finished the 2025–26 season 20–12 overall and 12–6 in ASUN play, finishing fourth in the conference. As the No. 4 seed in the ASUN tournament, they pulled off a major upset by defeating No. 5 seed Florida Gulf Coast by 70–63 in the quarterfinals, ending an eight-season streak of conference titles and a 13-year streak of championship game appearances for the Eagles. They then advanced to the semifinals, where they fell to No. 8 Austin Peay 52–68 in the semifinals.

Following the loss, the Hatters earned an at-large bid to the WNIT, their sixth appearance in the tournament. They lost in overtime in the first round 73–76 to FIU to end their season.

On March 16, 2026, it was announced that long-time head coach Lynn Bria would be stepping down at the end of the season after eighteen seasons with the program. On April 2, Melissa DeVore was announced as the team's new head coach, who was previously serving as the women's basketball head coach at Division II Coker.

== Offseason ==
=== Departures ===
Stetson departures
Name	Num	Pos.	Height	Year	Hometown	Reason for departure
Mary McMillan	3	Guard	5'6"	Graduate student	Apopka, FL	Graduated
Aleah Sorrentino	5	Forward	6'2"	Graduate student	Palm Bay, FL	Graduated
Cameron Thomas	21	Guard	5'9"	Senior	Hazel Crest, IL	Graduated
Promise Keshi	27	Guard	5'10"	Senior	Rubano, Italy	Graduated
Rose Caso	40	Guard-Forward	5'10"	Graduate student	Ellington, CT	Graduated

=== Incoming transfers ===
Stetson incoming transfers
Name	Num	Pos.	Height	Year	Hometown	Previous school
Sofia Moschen	20	Forward	6'2"	Sophomore	São Paulo, Brazil	Bowling Green

=== Recruiting class ===
There was no recruiting class for 2026.

== Preseason ==
On October 27, 2026, the ASUN released its annual preseason poll and honor awards. Stetson was picked to finish fourth in the conference.

=== Preseason rankings ===
ASUN Preseason Poll
Place	Team	Votes
T-1	Jacksonville	58 (4)
T-1	Florida Gulf Coast	58 (3)
3	Lipscomb	N/A
4	Stetson	N/A
5	North Florida	N/A
6	Queens	N/A (1)
7	West Florida	N/A
8	Bellarmine	N/A
(#) first-place votes

=== Preseason All-ASUN Team ===
No players were named to the Preseason All-ASUN Team.

== Roster ==
Years are listed according to the new NCAA age-based eligibility model.

2026–27 Stetson Hatters women's basketball team
Players
Coaches

Pos.	#	Name	Height	Year	Previous school	Hometown
G	1	Desireck Nieves	5 ft 7 in (1.7 m)	Fr	Central Pointe Christian Academy	San Juan, PR
F	3	Addison Godby	6 ft 0 in (1.83 m)	Fr	Fairland High School	Proctorville, OH
G	4	Eva Bradshaw	5 ft 5 in (1.65 m)	Sr	The Master's Academy; Daytona State College	Oviedo, FL
G	5	Sophie Locatelli	5 ft 7 in (1.7 m)	So	Pallacanestro Bellinzona	Sorengo, Switzerland
G	10	Jorah Eppley	5 ft 9 in (1.75 m)	Sr	Catholic High School	Virginia Beach, VA
G	11	Candela Garcia-Escribano Pozo	5 ft 11 in (1.8 m)	Jr	IES Eijo y Garay; LIU	Madrid, Spain
G	12	Zoie Lofton	5 ft 6 in (1.68 m)	Fr	Grayson High School	Snellville, GA
F	13	Raven LeXander	5 ft 10 in (1.78 m)	Jr	Myers Park High School	Charlotte, NC
F	14	Favour Nmecha Anyaele	6 ft 3 in (1.91 m)	Sr	Day Secondary School; Ellsworth Community College	Minna, Nigeria
F	20	Sofia Moschen	6 ft 2 in (1.88 m)	So	Centro Educational Leonardo Da Vinci; Bowling Green	São Paulo, Brazil
F	21	Heidi Rathmann	6 ft 1 in (1.85 m)	Fr	Antioch Community High School	Antioch, IL
F	24	Kieren Smith	6 ft 1 in (1.85 m)	Fr	Bartlett High School	Memphis, TN
G	30	Cici Driessen	5 ft 5 in (1.65 m)	Sr	Garden City Community College	Snellville, GA

Head coach

- Melissa DeVore (Charleston Southern)

Assistant coach(es)

- Reggie Mosley (Indiana State)
- Ryan McGee (Middle Georgia State)
- Brittany Drew (Guilford)
- Kristynn Knight (Coker)

Legend

- (C) Team captain
- (S) Suspended
- (I) Ineligible
- (W) Walk-on
- (5th) Fifth-year senior
- Injured
- Current redshirt

Roster
Last update: July 17, 2026

== Schedule and results ==
Date time, TV	Rank^{#}	Opponent^{#}	Result	Record	High points	High rebounds	High assists	Site (attendance) city, state
Non-conference regular season
November 2, 2026*; 7:00 p.m., ESPN+		Flagler	W 75–52	1–0	21 – Garcia-Escribano Pozo	8 – Anyaele	4 – Garcia-Escribano Pozo	Edmunds Center (347); DeLand, FL
November 4, 2026*; 8:00 p.m., ACCNX		at No. 7 Louisville	L 35–87	1–1	10 – Driessen	7 – Nieves	2 – Locatelli	KFC Yum! Center (6,696); Louisville, KY
November 8, 2026*; 2:00 p.m., ACCNX		at Miami (FL)						Watsco Center; Coral Gables, FL
November 10, 2026*; 7:00 p.m., ESPN+		at FIU						Ocean Bank Convocation Center; Miami, FL
November 15, 2026*; 5:00 p.m., ACCNX		at Clemson						Littlejohn Coliseum; Clemson, SC
November 19, 2026*; 6:30 p.m.		at UCF						Addition Financial Arena; Orlando, FL
November 22, 2026*; 2:00 p.m., ESPN+		Wright State						Edmunds Center; DeLand, FL
November 25, 2026*; 1:15 p.m., BallerTV		vs. Robert Morris; Daytona Beach Classic						Ocean Center; Dayton Beach, FL
November 27, 2026*; 10:00 a.m., BallerTV		vs. Boise State; Daytona Beach Classic						Ocean Center; Dayton Beach, FL
December 1, 2026*; 7:00 p.m., ESPN+		Florida A&M						Edmunds Center; DeLand, FL
December 7, 2026*; 7:00 p.m., ESPN+		Fort Lauderdale						Edmunds Center; DeLand, FL
December 12, 2026*; 3:00 p.m., ESPN+		at UT Arlington						College Park Center; Arlington, TX
December 14, 2026*; 7:00 p.m., ESPN+		at Abilene Christian						Moody Coliseum; Abilene, TX
December 20, 2026*; 2:00 p.m., ESPN+		Longwood; Holiday Hoops						Edmunds Center; DeLand, FL
December 21, 2026*; 11:30 a.m., ESPN+		Towson; Holiday Hoops						Edmunds Center; DeLand, FL
December 29, 2026*; 7:00 p.m., ESPN+		Central Arkansas						Edmunds Center; DeLand, FL
December 31, 2026*; 2:00 p.m., ESPN+		Little Rock						Edmunds Center; DeLand, FL
January 3, 2027*; 1:00 p.m., ESPN+		at Tarleton State						EECU Center; Stephenville, TX
ASUN regular season
January 9, 2027; 2:00 p.m., ESPN+		at Florida Gulf Coast						Alico Arena; Fort Myers, FL
January 14, 2027; 7:00 p.m., ESPN+		West Florida						Edmunds Center; DeLand, FL
January 16, 2027; 2:00 p.m., ESPN+		Queens						Edmunds Center; DeLand, FL
January 21, 2027; 7:00 p.m., ESPN+		at Lipscomb						Allen Arena; Nashville, TN
January 23, 2027; 2:00 p.m., ESPN+		at Bellarmine						Knights Hall; Louisville, KY
January 28, 2027; 5:00 p.m., ESPN+		at North Florida						UNF Arena; Jacksonville, FL
January 30, 2027; 2:00 p.m., ESPN+		at Jacksonville						Swisher Gymnasium; Jacksonville, FL
February 4, 2027; 11:00 a.m., ESPN+		Bellarmine						Edmunds Center; DeLand, FL
February 6, 2027; 2:00 p.m., ESPN+		Lipscomb						Edmunds Center; DeLand, FL
February 11, 2027; 7:00 p.m., ESPN+		at Queens						Curry Arena; Charlotte, NC
February 13, 2027; 2:00 p.m., ESPN+		at West Florida						PenAir Field House; Pensacola, FL
February 20, 2027; 2:00 p.m., ESPN+		Florida Gulf Coast						Edmunds Center; DeLand, FL
February 25, 2027; 5:00 p.m., ESPN+		Jacksonville						Edmunds Center; DeLand, FL
February 27, 2027; 1:00 p.m., ESPN+		North Florida						Edmunds Center; DeLand, FL
ASUN tournament
March 4–8, 2027; TBA		vs.						VyStar Veterans Memorial Arena; Jacksonville, FL
*Non-conference game. ^{#}Rankings from AP Poll. (#) Tournament seedings in parentheses. All times are in Eastern.
