= 2026–27 Queens Royals women's basketball team =

American college basketball season

2026–27 Queens Royals women's basketball
- Conference: Atlantic Sun Conference
- Record: 0–2 (0–0 ASUN)
- Head coach: Jen Brown (6th season)
- Assistant coaches: Kenneth Blake; Toia Giggetts; Taylor Todd-Williams; Aylesha Wade
- Home arena: Curry Arena

2026–27 ASUN women's basketball standings
	Conf.				Overall
Team	W		L	PCT	W		L	PCT
Bellarmine	0	–	0	–	1	–	1	.500
Jacksonville	0	–	0	–	1	–	1	.500
Stetson	0	–	0	–	1	–	1	.500
Florida Gulf Coast	0	–	0	–	0	–	1	.000
North Florida	0	–	0	–	0	–	1	.000
Lipscomb	0	–	0	–	0	–	2	.000
Queens	0	–	0	–	0	–	2	.000
West Florida*	0	–	0	–	0	–	2	.000
† 2027 ASUN tournament winner * ineligible for the 2027 NCAA tournament due to transition from Division II; As of November 7, 2026

The 2026–27 Queens Royals women's basketball team currently represent the Queens University of Charlotte during the 2026–27 NCAA Division I women's basketball season. The Royals, led by seventh-year head coach Jen Brown, play their home games at Curry Arena in Charlotte, North Carolina, and compete as a member of the Atlantic Sun Conference.

== Previous season ==
The Royals finished the 2025–26 season 10–20 overall and 4–14 in ASUN play, finishing in a tie for tenth in the conference with North Florida. As the No. 11 seed in the ASUN tournament, they lost in the first round 55–57 to No. 6 North Alabama to end their season.

== Offseason ==
=== Departures ===
Queens departures
Name	Num.	Pos.	Height	Year	Hometown	Reason for departure
Alyssa Lewis	1	Guard	5'7"	Junior	Harrisburg, NC	Entered transfer portal
Jermany Mapp	3	Guard	6'0"	Graduate student	Chester, SC	Graduated
Magda Friere	6	Sophomore	5'8"	Sophomore	Linda a Velha, Portugal	Transferred to Dartmouth
Shanelle Smith	7	Guard	5'7"	Senior	Staten Island, NY	Entered transfer portal
Tamar Kopilevich	8	Forward	6'3"	Senior	Ashdod, Israel	Graduated
Ana Barreto	10	Guard	6'1"	Senior	Lisbon, Portugal	Graduated
Imani Morris	11	Forward-Center	6'3"	Junior	Oakland, CA	Entered transfer portal
Hannah Hicks	21	Forward	6'1"	Graduate student	Cleveland, OH	Graduated
Dayuna Colvin	22	Guard	5'9"	Senior	Kennesaw, GA	Graduated

=== Incoming transfers ===
Queens incoming transfers
Name	Num.	Pos.	Height	Year	Hometown	Previous school
Anisa Akinola	0	Guard-Forward	5'10"	Sophomore	Livingston, NJ	Pace (D-II)
Ahmani Klabunde	3	Guard	5'7"	Junior	Omaha, NE	Labette (NJCAA)
Cianna Papineau	4	Guard	5'8"	Junior	Onondaga County, NY	Union (NJ) (NJCAA)
Paulina Reichenauer	8	Guard	5'10"	Sophomore	Waiblingen, Germany	LSU Eunice (NJCAA)
Makayla Minshall	11	Guard	5'9"	Junior	Sydney, Australia	UC Riverside
Ryan Davis	14	Forward	6'0"	Sophomore	Cincinnati, OH	Fairmont State (D-II)
Ashantay Noble	21	Guard-Forward	5'10"	Junior	Statesboro, GA	Tallahassee State (NJCAA)

=== Recruiting class ===
There was no 2026 recruiting class.

== Preseason ==
On October 27, 2026, the ASUN released its annual preseason poll and honor awards. Queens was picked to finish sixth in the conference, along with one out of eight first place votes.

=== Preseason rankings ===
ASUN Preseason Poll
Place	Team	Votes
T-1	Jacksonville	58 (4)
T-1	Florida Gulf Coast	58 (3)
3	Lipscomb	N/A
4	Stetson	N/A
5	North Florida	N/A
6	Queens	N/A (1)
7	West Florida	N/A
8	Bellarmine	N/A
(#) first-place votes

=== Preseason All-ASUN Team ===
Preseason All-ASUN Team
Player	Year	Position
Brenae Jones-Grant	Junior	Forward

== Roster ==
2026–27 Queens Royals women's basketball team
Players
Coaches

Pos.	#	Name	Height	Year	Previous school	Hometown
G/F	0	Anisa Akinola	5 ft 10 in (1.78 m)	So	Choate Rosemary Hall; Pace	Livingston, NJ
G/F	2	Janiya Milligan	6 ft 2 in (1.88 m)	Fr	T. Wingate Andrews High School	Mount Vernon, NY
G	3	Ahmani Klabunde	5 ft 7 in (1.7 m)	Jr	Omaha Benson High School; Labette CC	Omaha, NE
G	4	Cianna Papineau	5 ft 8 in (1.73 m)	Jr	Lafayette Junior-Senior High School; Union College (NJ)	Onondaga County, NY
F	5	Brenae Jones-Grant	6 ft 1 in (1.85 m)	Jr	Immaculate Conception High School; Cleveland State	Plainfield, NJ
G	8	Paulina Reichenauer	5 ft 10 in (1.78 m)	So	Salier Gymnasium; LSU Eunice	Waiblingen, Germany
G	9	Kelley Hutcherson	5 ft 9 in (1.75 m)	So	Culpeper County High School	Culpeper, VA
F	10	Nykira Arrington	6 ft 0 in (1.83 m)	Fr	South Mecklenburg High School	Rocky Mount, NC
G	11	Makayla Minshall	5 ft 9 in (1.75 m)	Jr	Westfields Sports High School; UC Riverside	Sydney, Australia
F	14	Ryan Davis	6 ft 0 in (1.83 m)	So	Winton Woods High School; Fairmont State	Cincinnati, OH
G/F	21	Ashantay Noble	5 ft 10 in (1.78 m)	Jr	Bulloch Academy; Tallahassee State College	Statesboro, GA
G	23	Mia Moore	5 ft 9 in (1.75 m)	Sr	East Aurora High School; Rock Valley College	Aurora, IL
C	31	Breah Franks	6 ft 3 in (1.91 m)	So	J. L. Mann High School	Greenville, SC
F	32	Shadeh Preston	6 ft 1 in (1.85 m)	Fr	IGS Franzsches Feld	Denstrof, Germany
G	35	Shira Shani	5 ft 6 in (1.68 m)	Fr	Ort Giv'atayim	Giv'atayim, Israel

Head coach

- Jen Brown (James Madison)

Assistant coach(es)

- Kenneth Blake (Liberty)
- Toia Giggetts (James Madison)
- Taylor Todd-Williams (East Carolina)
- Aylesha Wade (Queens (NC))

Legend

- (C) Team captain
- (S) Suspended
- (I) Ineligible
- (W) Walk-on
- Injured
- Current redshirt

Roster
Last update: July 22, 2026

== Schedule and results ==
Date time, TV	Rank^{#}	Opponent^{#}	Result	Record	High points	High rebounds	High assists	Site (attendance) city, state
Regular season
November 2, 2026*; 7:00 p.m., SECN+		at Alabama	L 56–92	0–1	18 – Minshall	7 – Jones-Grant	3 – Tied	Coleman Coliseum (2,376); Tuscaloosa, AL
November 4, 2026*; 7:30 p.m., SECN+		at No. 8 Vanderbilt	L 42–100	0–2	8 – Noble	5 – Tied	2 – Akinola	Memorial Gymnasium (2,806); Nashville, TN
November 9, 2026*; 7:00 p.m.		Carolina						Curry Arena; Charlotte, NC
November 14, 2026*; 2:00 p.m.		at Gardner–Webb						Paul Porter Arena; Boiling Springs, NC
November 18, 2026*; TBA		Charleston						Curry Arena; Charlotte, NC
November 21, 2026*; TBA		Coker						Curry Arena; Charlotte, NC
November 27, 2026*; TBA		at UNC Asheville						Kimmel Arena; Asheville, NC
November 28, 2026*; TBA		at Western Carolina						Ramsey Center; Cullowhee, NC
December 2, 2026*; TBA		at USC Upstate						G.B. Hodge Center; Spartanburg, SC
December 6, 2026*; TBA		West Georgia						Curry Arena; Charlotte, NC
December 13, 2026*; TBA		UNC Wilmington						Curry Arena; Charlotte, NC
December 19, 2026*; TBA		North Alabama						Curry Arena; Charlotte, NC
December 22, 2026*; TBA		at North Carolina Central						McDougald–McLendon Arena; Durham, NC
December 31, 2026*; TBA		at Austin Peay						F&M Bank Arena; Clarksville, TN
January 2, 2027*; TBA		at Eastern Kentucky						Baptist Health Arena; Richmond, KY
January 9, 2027; TBA		at West Florida						UWF Field House; Pensacola, FL
January 11, 2027*; TBA		South Carolina State						Curry Arena; Charlotte, NC
January 14, 2027; TBA		at Florida Gulf Coast						Alico Arena; Fort Myers, FL
January 16, 2027; TBA		at Stetson						Edmunds Center; DeLand, FL
January 21, 2027; TBA		Jacksonville						Curry Arena; Charlotte, NC
January 23, 2027; TBA		North Florida						Curry Arena; Charlotte, NC
January 28, 2027; TBA		at Bellarmine						Knights Hall; Louisville, KY
January 30, 2027; TBA		at Lipscomb						Allen Arena; Nashville, TN
February 6, 2027; TBA		West Florida						Curry Arena; Charlotte, NC
February 11, 2027; TBA		Stetson						Curry Arena; Charlotte, NC
February 13, 2027; TBA		Florida Gulf Coast						Curry Arena; Charlotte, NC
February 18, 2027; TBA		at North Florida						UNF Arena; Jacksonville, FL
February 20, 2027; TBA		at Jacksonville						Swisher Gymnasium; Jacksonville, FL
February 25, 2027; TBA		Florida Gulf Coast						Curry Arena; Charlotte, NC
February 27, 2027; TBA		Bellarmine						Curry Arena; Charlotte, NC
ASUN tournament
March 4–8, 2027; TBA		vs.						VyStar Veterans Memorial Arena; Jacksonville, FL
*Non-conference game. ^{#}Rankings from AP Poll. (#) Tournament seedings in parentheses. All times are in Eastern.
