= 2026–27 Bellarmine Knights women's basketball team =

American college basketball season

2026–27 Bellarmine Knights women's basketball
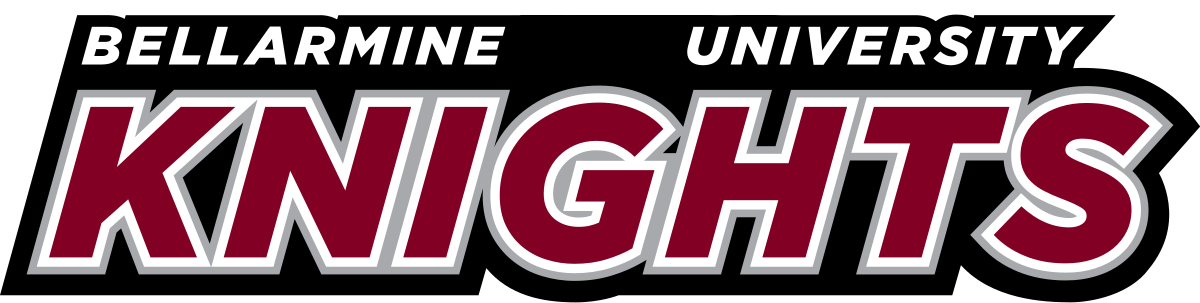
- Conference: Atlantic Sun Conference
- Record: 2–5 (0–0 ASUN)
- Head coach: Monique Reid (2nd season)
- Assistant coaches: Devrinn Paul; Camille McLellan; Shaqwedia Wallace
- Home arena: Knights Hall

2026–27 ASUN women's basketball standings
| | Conf. | | | | Overall |
| Team | W | | L | PCT | W | | L | PCT |
|---|---|---|---|---|---|---|---|---|
| North Florida | 0 | – | 0 | – | 5 | – | 2 | .714 |
| Florida Gulf Coast | 0 | – | 0 | – | 4 | – | 2 | .667 |
| Jacksonville | 0 | – | 0 | – | 3 | – | 2 | .600 |
| West Florida* | 0 | – | 0 | – | 3 | – | 3 | .500 |
| Lipscomb | 0 | – | 0 | – | 2 | – | 3 | .400 |
| Queens | 0 | – | 0 | – | 2 | – | 3 | .400 |
| Bellarmine | 0 | – | 0 | – | 2 | – | 5 | .286 |
| Stetson | 0 | – | 0 | – | 1 | – | 5 | .167 |
† 2027 ASUN tournament winner * ineligible for the 2027 NCAA tournament due to transition from Division II; As of November 21, 2026

The 2026–27 Bellarmine Knights women's basketball team currently represents Bellarmine University during the 2026–27 NCAA Division I women's basketball season. The Knights, led by second-year head coach Monique Reid, play their home games at Knights Hall in Louisville, Kentucky, and compete as a member of the Atlantic Sun Conference.

== Previous season ==
The Knights finished the 2025–26 season 2–30 overall and 0–18 in ASUN play, to finish last in the conference. The former was their worst record in program history, and the latter marked the first time in ASUN history that a team had gone winless. As the No. 12 seed in the ASUN tournament, they suffered a 66-point blowout to No. 5 Florida Gulf Coast as they lost 28–94 in the first round to end the season.

The Knights were plagued with injuries, with multiple players suffering season-ending injuries and leaving the team with only three scholarship players available by the end of the season. They later added six walk-on players to the roster, and ultimately finished the season with twenty listed players. Walk-on Olivia Pifer was later promoted to a scholarship player in May following the season after joining the program in January.

== Offseason ==
=== Departures ===
Bellarmine departures
| Name | Num | Pos. | Height | Year | Hometown | Reason for departure |
|---|---|---|---|---|---|---|
| Miyah Brown | 0 | Guard | 5'10" | Senior | Rockford, IL | Transferred to UIC (Note: Did not play during the 2025–26 season due to injury.) |
| Mariah Daniels | 00 | Guard | 5'6" | Freshman | Louisville, KY | Walk-on |
| Seairra Hughes | 1 | Forward | 6'0" | Graduate Student | Denver, CO | TBD; entered transfer portal 3/18/2026 |
| Rachel Shropshire | 2 | Forward | 6'3" | Sophomore | Frankfort, KY | Transferred to Mercer |
| Ava Smith | 3 | Guard | 5'8" | Sophomore | Camas, WA | Transferred to Utah Tech |
| Megan Wearsch | 4 | Guard | 5'6" | Freshman | Louisville, KY | Walk-on |
| Carly Bryant | 5 | Guard | 5'5" | Freshman | Mount Washington, KY | Walk-on |
| Ashlee Harris | 5 | Guard | 5'6" | Graduate Student | Louisville, KY | Graduated |
| Rose Jamison | 7 | Guard-Forward | 6'0" | (redshirt) Junior | Fairfield, CA | Transferred to Florida A&M |
| Maddie Janszen | 10 | Guard | 5'9" | Freshman | Covington, KY | Walk-on |
| Claire Slocum | 11 | Forward | 5'7" | Freshman | Hebron, KY | Walk-on |
| Andrea Chiquemba | 14 | Forward | 6'1" | RS Junior | Vila Nova de Gaia, Portugal | Transferred to Texas A&M–Corpus Christi |
| Erin Toller | 20 | Guard | 5'7" | Graduate Student | Louisville, KY | Graduated |
| Patricia Sherrill | 34 | Center | 6'1" | Graduate Student | Alexandria, VA | Graduated |
| Kendall Wingler | 55 | Guard | 5'9" | Graduate Student | Ekron, KY | Graduated |
| Asiah Harris | — | Forward | 5'11" | Senior | Los Angeles, CA | TBD (Note: Was an incoming transfer from Benedict College, presumably left Bellarmine prior to start of season as she is no longer listed on the roster.) |

=== Incoming transfers ===
Bellarmine incoming transfers
| Name | Num | Pos. | Height | Year | Hometown | Previous school |
|---|---|---|---|---|---|---|
| Tacko Sy | 0 | Center | 6'5" | Sophomore | Pikine, Senegal | Chipola (NJCAA) |
| Savannah Rowland | 1 | Guard | 5'7" | Junior | Ridgecrest, CA | Lemoore College (NJCAA) |
| Coumba Keïta | 2 | Guard | 6'1" | Sophomore | Paris, France | Arkansas–Pine Bluff |
| Kellyn Hunter | 5 | Guard | 5'4" | Senior | Mobile, AL | Washburn (D-II) |
| Kaylyn Lelie | 20 | Guard | 5'9" | Junior | Queens, NY | Monroe (NJCAA) |

=== Recruiting class ===
There was no 2026 recruiting class.

== Preseason ==
On October 27, 2026, the ASUN released its annual preseason poll and honor awards. Bellarmine was picked to finish last in the conference.

=== Preseason rankings ===
ASUN Preseason Poll
| Place | Team | Votes |
|---|---|---|
| T-1 | Jacksonville | 58 (4) |
| T-1 | Florida Gulf Coast | 58 (3) |
| 3 | Lipscomb | N/A |
| 4 | Stetson | N/A |
| 5 | North Florida | N/A |
| 6 | Queens | N/A (1) |
| 7 | West Florida | N/A |
| 8 | Bellarmine | N/A |
(#) first-place votes

=== Preseason All-ASUN Team ===
Preseason All-ASUN Team
| Player | Year | Position |
|---|---|---|
| Triniti Ralston | Senior | Guard |

== Roster ==
2026–27 Bellarmine Knights women's basketball team
Players
Coaches

| Pos. | # | Name | Height | Year | Previous school | Hometown |
|---|---|---|---|---|---|---|
| C | 0 | Tacko Sy | 6 ft 5 in (1.96 m) | So | Putnam Science Academy; Chipola College | Pikine, Senegal |
| G | 1 | Savannah Rowland | 5 ft 7 in (1.7 m) | Jr | Sherman E. Burroughs High School; Lemoore College | Ridgecrest, CA |
| G | 2 | Coumba Keïta | 6 ft 1 in (1.85 m) | So | Ontario Virtual School; Arkansas–Pine Bluff | Paris, France |
| G | 4 | Triniti Ralston | 5 ft 5 in (1.65 m) | Sr | Sacred Heart Academy; Southern Indiana | Louisville, KY |
| G | 5 | Kellyn Hunter | 5 ft 4 in (1.63 m) | Sr | Faith Academy; Washburn | Mobile, AL |
| G | 8 | Emma Holtzapfel | 5 ft 11 in (1.8 m) | Fr | Notre Dame Academy | Edgewood, KY |
| G | 10 | Leigha Acoff | 5 ft 10 in (1.78 m) | Fr | Woodward Career Technical High School | Cincinnati, OH |
| G/F | 11 | Anna Rodgers | 5 ft 11 in (1.8 m) | RS So | Bullitt East High School | Mount Washington, KY |
| F | 12 | Kayce Hyman | 5 ft 10 in (1.78 m) | Jr | Hammond School | Irmo, SC |
| C | 13 | Haya Abdel Aal | 6 ft 4 in (1.93 m) | So | Alexandria House of English | Alexandria, Egypt |
| G | 14 | Tristan Shivers | 5 ft 4 in (1.63 m) | Fr | John T. Hoggard High School | Wilmington, NC |
| G | 20 | Kaylyn Lelie | 5 ft 9 in (1.75 m) | Jr | St. Francis Preparatory School; Monroe | Queens, NY |
| G | 21 | Olivia Pifer | 5 ft 4 in (1.63 m) | So | Mercy Academy | Louisville, KY |
| C | 35 | Hana Abdel Aal | 6 ft 2 in (1.88 m) | RS So | Alexandria House of English | Alexandria, Egypt |

Head coach

- Monique Reid (Louisville)

Assistant coach(es)

- Devrinn Paul (Kentucky State)
- Camille McLellan (Ohio State)
- Shaqwedia Wallace (Temple)

Legend

- (C) Team captain
- (S) Suspended
- (I) Ineligible
- (W) Walk-on
- Injured
- Current redshirt

Roster
Last update: October 29, 2026

== Schedule and results ==
| Date time, TV | Rank^{#} | Opponent^{#} | Result | Record | High points | High rebounds | High assists | Site (attendance) city, state |
Exhibition
| October 29, 2026; 6:30 p.m. | | Spalding | W 110–49 | | – | – | – | Knights Hall; Louisville, KY |
Non-conference regular season
| November 2, 2026*; 5:00 p.m., ACCNX | | at No. 7 Louisville | L 47–119 | 0–1 | 9 – Tied | 9 – Keïta | 2 – Acoff | KFC Yum! Center (7,075); Louisville, KY |
| November 5, 2026*; 6:30 p.m., ESPN+ | | Simmons | W 113–47 | 1–1 | 22 – Sy | 15 – Hana Abdel Aal | 7 – Rowland | Knights Hall (350); Louisville, KY |
| November 8, 2026*; 1:00 p.m., ESPN+ | | at Miami (OH) | L 37–92 | 1–2 | 11 – Hana Abdel Aal | 6 – Hyman | 3 – Ralston | Millett Hall (379); Oxford, OH |
| November 10, 2026*; 11:00 a.m., ESPN+ | | at Bowling Green | L 66–91 | 1–3 | 20 – Ralston | 7 – Haya Abdel Aal | 4 – Tied | Stroh Center (1,893); Bowling Green, KY |
| November 14, 2026*; 5:00 p.m., ESPN+ | | Bradley | L 55–66 | 1–4 | 13 – Acoff | 8 – Sy | 5 – Ralston | Knights Hall (257); Louisville, KY |
| November 17, 2026*; 7:00 p.m., ESPN+ | | at Indiana State | L 45–76 | 1–5 | 13 – Sy | 9 – Sy | 7 – Hunter | Hulman Center (1,247); Terre Haute, IN |
| November 20, 2026*; 6:30 p.m., ESPN+ | | Alice Lloyd | W 78–50 | 2–5 | 14 – Holtzapfel | 9 – Hana Abdel Aal | 3 – Tied | Knights Hall (232); Louisville, KY |
| November 29, 2026*; 2:00 p.m., ESPN+ | | Brescia | | | | | | Knights Hall; Louisville, KY |
| December 2, 2026*; 11:00 a.m., ESPN+ | | at Cincinnati | | | | | | Fifth Third Arena; Cincinnati, OH |
| December 6, 2026*; 2:00 p.m., ESPN+/SECN+ | | at Kentucky | | | | | | Memorial Coliseum; Lexington, KY |
| December 9, 2026*; 6:30 p.m., ESPN+ | | Austin Peay | | | | | | Knights Hall; Louisville, KY |
| December 13, 2026*; 1:00 p.m., ESPN+ | | Mercer | | | | | | Knights Hall; Louisville, KY |
| December 15, 2026*; 6:30 p.m., ESPN+ | | Murray State | | | | | | Knights Hall; Louisville, KY |
| December 21, 2026*; 6:30 p.m., ESPN+ | | Eastern Kentucky | | | | | | Knights Hall; Louisville, KY |
| December 31, 2026*; 2:00 p.m., ESPN+ | | at North Alabama | | | | | | CB&S Bank Arena; Florence, AL |
| January 2, 2027*; 2:00 p.m., ESPN+ | | at West Georgia | | | | | | The Coliseum; Carrollton, GA |
ASUN regular season
| January 9, 2027; 1:00 p.m., ESPN+ | | Lipscomb | | | | | | Knights Hall; Louisville, KY |
| January 14, 2027; 7:00 p.m., ESPN+ | | at North Florida | | | | | | UNF Arena; Jacksonville, FL |
| January 16, 2027; 1:00 p.m., ESPN+ | | at Jacksonville | | | | | | Swisher Gymnasium; Jacksonville, FL |
| January 21, 2027; 6:30 p.m., ESPN+ | | Florida Gulf Coast | | | | | | Knights Hall; Louisville, KY |
| January 23, 2027; 2:00 p.m., ESPN+ | | Stetson | | | | | | Knights Hall; Louisville, KY |
| January 28, 2027; 7:00 p.m., ESPN+ | | Queens | | | | | | Knights Hall; Louisville, KY |
| January 30, 2027; 12:00 p.m., ESPN+ | | West Florida | | | | | | Knights Hall; Louisville, KY |
| February 4, 2027; 11:00 a.m., ESPN+ | | at Stetson | | | | | | Insight Credit Union Arena; DeLand, FL |
| February 6, 2027; 4:00 p.m., ESPN+ | | at Florida Gulf Coast | | | | | | Alico Arena; Fort Myers, FL |
| February 11, 2027; 6:30 p.m., ESPN+ | | Jacksonville | | | | | | Knights Hall; Louisville, KY |
| February 13, 2027; 2:00 p.m., ESPN+ | | North Florida | | | | | | Knights Hall; Louisville, KY |
| February 20, 2027; 3:00 p.m., ESPN+ | | at Lipscomb | | | | | | Allen Arena; Nashville, TN |
| February 25, 2027; 7:00 p.m., ESPN+ | | at West Florida | | | | | | PenAir Field House; Pensacola, FL |
| February 27, 2027; 2:00 p.m., ESPN+ | | at Queens | | | | | | Curry Arena; Charlotte, NC |
ASUN tournament
| March 4–8, 2027; TBA | | vs. | | | | | | VyStar Veterans Memorial Arena; FJacksonville, FL |
*Non-conference game. ^{#}Rankings from AP Poll. (#) Tournament seedings in parentheses. All times are in Eastern.
