= 2026–27 Jacksonville Dolphins women's basketball team =

American college basketball season

2026–27 Jacksonville Dolphins women's basketball
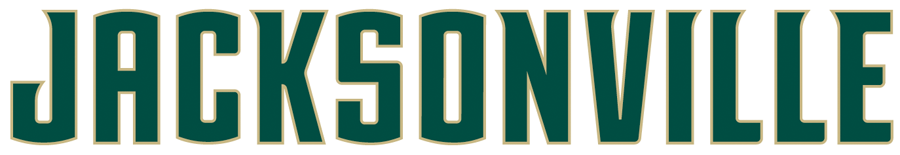
- Conference: Atlantic Sun Conference
- Record: 1–2 (0–0 ASUN)
- Head coach: Special Jennings (4th season)
- Assistant coaches: Shenneika Smith; Monterika Warren; Diego Torres
- Home arena: Swisher Gymnasium

2026–27 ASUN women's basketball standings
	Conf.				Overall
Team	W		L	PCT	W		L	PCT
Florida Gulf Coast	0	–	0	–	2	–	1	.667
North Florida	0	–	0	–	2	–	1	.667
Jacksonville	0	–	0	–	1	–	2	.333
Lipscomb	0	–	0	–	1	–	2	.333
Queens	0	–	0	–	1	–	2	.333
Bellarmine	0	–	0	–	1	–	3	.250
Stetson	0	–	0	–	1	–	3	.250
West Florida*	0	–	0	–	1	–	3	.250
† 2027 ASUN tournament winner * ineligible for the 2027 NCAA tournament due to transition from Division II; As of November 13, 2026

The 2026–27 Jacksonville Dolphins women's basketball team currently represents Jacksonville University during the 2026–27 NCAA Division I women's basketball season. The Dolphins, led by fourth-year head coach Special Jennings, play their home games at Swisher Gymnasium in Jacksonville, Florida, and compete as a member of the Atlantic Sun Conference.

== Previous season ==
The Dolphins finished the 2025–26 season 24–9 overall, tying a program-best record, and 13–5 in ASUN play, finishing in a tie for second in the conference with Central Arkansas. As the No. 2 seed in the ASUN tournament, they earned a bye to the quarterfinals, defeating No. 7 West Georgia 86–77. They then advanced to the semifinals where they beat No. 3 Central Arkansas 67–58. Finally, they defeated No. 8 Austin Peay 66–63 in overtime in the championship game, claiming their second conference title in program history and earning an automatic bid to the NCAA tournament, both for the first time since 2016.

In the NCAA tournament, the Dolphins were seeded No. 15 in the Sacramento #2 Regional. They lost in the first round to No. 3 seed LSU 58–116 to end their season.

== Offseason ==
=== Departures ===
Jacksonville departures
Name	Num.	Pos.	Height	Year	Hometown	Reason for departure
Comari Mitchell	5	Guard	5'8"	Sophomore	Richmond, VA	Transferred to Hofstra
Carmaya Bowman	10	Forward	5'10"	Junior	Hampstead, MD	Transferred to Mercyhurst
Bailey Burns	11	Guard	5'10"	Junior	Lee's Summit, MO	Transferred to Texas Southern
Kali Howard	12	Forward	5'11"	Senior	Zachary, LA	Graduated
Mariah Knight	22	Forward	6'1"	Sophomore	Louisville, KY	Transferred to Georgia State
Priscilla Williams	23	Guard	6'2"	Graduate Student	Houston, TX	Graduated
Makiya Miller	24	Guard	5'7"	Senior	Reynoldsburg, OH	Graduated

=== Incoming transfers ===
Jacksonville incoming transfers
Name	Num.	Pos.	Height	Year	Hometown	Previous school
Kelis Grant	5	Guard	5'7"	Senior	Dallas, TX	Sam Houston
Taylor Blunt	12	Guard	5'8"	Graduate Student	Aston, PA	Edinboro (D-II)
A'Yiana Flemings	24	Forward	6'4"	Junior	New Orleans, LA	McNeese

=== Recruiting class ===
There was no 2026 recruiting class.

== Preseason ==
On October 27, 2026, the ASUN released its annual preseason poll and honor awards. Jacksonville was picked to finish first in the conference in a tie with Florida Gulf Coast, receiving four out of eight first place votes.

=== Preseason rankings ===
ASUN Preseason Poll
Place	Team	Votes
T-1	Jacksonville	58 (4)
T-1	Florida Gulf Coast	58 (3)
3	Lipscomb	N/A
4	Stetson	N/A
5	North Florida	N/A
6	Queens	N/A (1)
7	West Florida	N/A
8	Bellarmine	N/A
(#) first-place votes

=== Preseason All-ASUN Team ===
Preseason All-ASUN Team
Player	Year	Position
Tatum Brown	Sophomore	Guard
Aniah Smith	Sophomore	Guard

== Roster ==
2026–27 Jacksonville Dolphins women's basketball team
Players
Coaches

Pos.	#	Name	Height	Year	Previous school	Hometown
G	0	Aniah Smith	5 ft 4 in (1.63 m)	So	Avon High School	Avon, IN
G	1	Mychal White	5 ft 6 in (1.68 m)	Jr	Summer Creek High School; Temple College	Harker Heights, TX
G	2	Tatum Brown	5 ft 6 in (1.68 m)	So	Grayson High School	Loganville, GA
G	3	Coco Rudolph	5 ft 7 in (1.7 m)	Fr	Grayson High School	Loganville, GA
G	4	Kimora Hester	5 ft 9 in (1.75 m)	So	Andrew Jackson High School	Jacksonville, FL
G	5	Kelis Grant	5 ft 7 in (1.7 m)	Sr	Cedar Hill High School; Sam Houston	Dallas, TX
G	10	J'Niya Weaver	5 ft 8 in (1.73 m)	Fr	Winston-Salem Christian School	PG County, MD
F	11	Samirah Mamoudou	6 ft 0 in (1.83 m)	Fr	Central Dauphin East High School	Harrisburg, PA
G	12	Taylor Blunt	5 ft 8 in (1.73 m)	GS	Peddie School; Edinboro	Aston, PA
F	15	Geren Hawthorne	6 ft 2 in (1.88 m)	Fr	Imhotep Institute Charter High School	Philadelphia, PA
F	20	Mariyah Brown	5 ft 10 in (1.78 m)	So	Summer Creek High School; Houston Christian	Houston, TX
F	21	Sharmela Reid	6 ft 1 in (1.85 m)	Sr	Dawson College; New Hampshire	Montreal, Quebec
G	23	McKenzie Lewis	5 ft 5 in (1.65 m)	Fr	Grand Street Campus	Brooklyn, NY
F	24	A'Yiana Flemings	6 ft 4 in (1.93 m)	Jr	Ursuline Academy; McNeese	New Orleans, LA
G	32	Giana Provenzano	5 ft 11 in (1.8 m)	Jr	Montverde Academy	Syracuse, NY

Head coach

- Special Jennings (Xavier)

Assistant coach(es)

- Shenneika Smith (St. John's)
- Monterika Warren (Bethune–Cookman)
- Diego Torres (Oregon)

Legend

- (C) Team captain
- (S) Suspended
- (I) Ineligible
- (W) Walk-on
- Injured
- Current redshirt

Roster
Last update: November 2, 2026

== Schedule and results ==
Date time, TV	Rank^{#}	Opponent^{#}	Result	Record	High points	High rebounds	High assists	Site (attendance) city, state
Non-conference regular season
November 3, 2026*; 7:00 p.m., ESPN+		at FIU	W 75–64	1–0	21 – Mamadou	11 – Mamadou	2 – Tied	Ocean Bank Convocation Center (156); Miami, FL
November 5, 2026*; 7:00 p.m., ACCNX		at Miami (FL)	L 63–79	1–1	15 – Mamadou	6 – Tied	3 – Hawthorne	Watsco Center (1,172); Coral Gables, FL
November 11, 2026*; 6:00 p.m., ESPN+		at Coastal Carolina	L 78–89	1–2	24 – Rudolph	7 – Weaver	4 – Smith	HTC Center (862); Conway, SC
November 14, 2026*; 2:00 p.m.		Warner						Swisher Gymnasium; Jacksonville, FL
November 20, 2026*; 6:30 p.m.		Trinity College of Jacksonville						Swisher Gymnasium; Jacksonville, FL
November 24, 2026*; 6:30 p.m.		at UCF						Addition Financial Arena; Orlando, FL
November 28, 2026*; 2:00 p.m.		Florida Tech						Swisher Gymnasium; Jacksonville, FL
December 5, 2026*; 2:00 p.m.		at Little Rock						Jack Stephens Center; Little Rock, AR
December 9, 2026*; 7:00 p.m.		at NC State						Reynolds Coliseum; Raleigh, NC
December 17, 2026*; 4:00 p.m.		at Georgia						Stegeman Coliseum; Athens, GA
December 28, 2026*; 6:00 p.m.		Fort Lauderdale						Swisher Gymnasium; Jacksonville, FL
December 31, 2026*; 2:00 p.m.		Tarleton State						Swisher Gymnasium; Jacksonville, FL
January 2, 2027*; 2:00 p.m.		Abilene Christian						Swisher Gymnasium; Jacksonville, FL
ASUN regular season
January 9, 2027; 2:00 p.m.		North Florida						Swisher Gymnasium; Jacksonville, FL
January 14, 2027; 11:00 a.m.		Lipscomb						Swisher Gymnasium; Jacksonville, FL
January 16, 2027; 1:00 p.m.		Bellarmine						Swisher Gymnasium; Jacksonville, FL
January 21, 2027; 6:00 p.m.		at Queens						Curry Arena; Charlotte, NC
January 23, 2027; 2:00 p.m.		at West Florida						PenAir Field House; Pensacola, FL
January 28, 2027; 6:00 p.m.		Florida Gulf Coast						Swisher Gymnasium; Jacksonville, FL
January 30, 2027; 2:00 p.m.		Stetson						Swisher Gymnasium; Jacksonville, FL
February 6, 2027; 2:00 p.m.		at North Florida						UNF Arena; Jacksonville, FL
February 11, 2027; 6:30 p.m.		at Bellarmine						Knights Hall; Louisville, KY
February 13, 2027; 1:00 p.m.		at Lipscomb						Allen Arena; Nashville, TN
February 18, 2027; 6:30 p.m.		West Florida						Swisher Gymnasium; Jacksonville, FL
February 20, 2027; 2:00 p.m.		Queens						Swisher Gymnasium; Jacksonville, FL
February 25, 2027; 5:00 p.m.		at Stetson						Insight Credit Union Arena; DeLand, FL
February 27, 2027; 1:00 p.m.		at Florida Gulf Coast						Alico Arena; Fort Myers, FL
ASUN tournament
March 4–8, 2027; TBA		vs.						VyStar Veterans Memorial Arena; Jacksonville, FL
*Non-conference game. ^{#}Rankings from AP Poll. (#) Tournament seedings in parentheses. All times are in Eastern.
