= 2026–27 Lipscomb Bisons women's basketball team =

American college basketball season

2026–27 Lipscomb Bisons women's basketball
- Conference: Atlantic Sun Conference
- Record: 0–1 (0–0 ASUN)
- Head coach: Lauren Sumski (8th season)
- Associate head coach: Chris Sumski
- Assistant coaches: Sydney Shelton; Bailey Pedigo; Makenna Reed
- Home arena: Allen Arena

2026–27 ASUN women's basketball standings
	Conf.				Overall
Team	W		L	PCT	W		L	PCT
Bellarmine	0	–	0	–	0	–	0	–
Florida Gulf Coast	0	–	0	–	0	–	0	–
Jacksonville	0	–	0	–	0	–	0	–
Lipscomb	0	–	0	–	0	–	0	–
North Florida	0	–	0	–	0	–	0	–
Queens	0	–	0	–	0	–	0	–
Stetson	0	–	0	–	0	–	0	–
West Florida*	0	–	0	–	0	–	0	–
† 2027 ASUN tournament winner * ineligible for the 2027 NCAA tournament due to transition from Division II

The 2026–27 Lipscomb Bisons women's basketball team currently represents Lipscomb University during the 2026–27 NCAA Division I women's basketball season. The Bisons, led by eighth-year head coach Lauren Sumski, play their home games at Allen Arena in Nashville, Tennessee, and compete as a member of the Atlantic Sun Conference.

== Previous season ==
The Bisons finished the 2025–26 season 10–20 overall and 7–11 in ASUN play, finishing ninth in the conference. As the No. 9 seed in the ASUN tournament, they lost in the first round by No. 8 seed Austin Peay 56–63 to end their season.

== Offseason ==
=== Departures ===
Lipscomb departures
Name	Num	Pos.	Height	Year	Hometown	Reason for departure
Olivia Vandergriff	0	Guard	5'7"	(redshirt) Sophomore	Guntersville, AL	Transferred to Young Harris (D-II) (Note: Did not play in the 2025–26 season.)
Molly Heard	3	Guard	6'0"	Senior	Pisgah, AL	Graduated
Addison Melton	22	Guard	5'11"	Sophomore	Murfreesboro, TN	Transferred to Tennessee Tech
Taylor Bowen	32	Guard	6'0"	Senior	Carmel, IN	Graduated

=== Incoming transfers ===
Lipscomb incoming transfers
Name	Num	Pos.	Height	Year	Hometown	Previous school
Kennedy Sproule	0	Guard	6'1"	Senior	Niverville, Manitoba	Valparaiso
Taliah Lee	3	Guard	5'11"	Senior	Spokane, WA	Mid-America Christian (NAIA)
Mia Smith	12	Guard	5'9"	Senior	Hensley, AR	Mid-America Christian (NAIA)

=== Recruiting class ===
There was no 2026 recruiting class.

== Preseason ==
On October 27, 2026, the ASUN released its annual preseason poll and honor awards. Lipscomb was picked to finish third in the conference.

=== Preseason rankings ===
ASUN Preseason Poll
Place	Team	Votes
T-1	Jacksonville	58 (4)
T-1	Florida Gulf Coast	58 (3)
3	Lipscomb	N/A
4	Stetson	N/A
5	North Florida	N/A
6	Queens	N/A (1)
7	West Florida	N/A
8	Bellarmine	N/A
(#) first-place votes

=== Preseason All-ASUN Team ===
Preseason All-ASUN Team
Player	Year	Position
Hope Counts	Sophomore	Guard
McKayla Miller	Senior	Guard

== Roster ==
2026–27 Lipscomb Bisons women's basketball team
Players
Coaches

Pos.	#	Name	Height	Year	Previous school	Hometown
G	0	Kennedy Sproule	6 ft 1 in (1.85 m)	Sr	Collège Churchill High School; Valparaiso	Niverville, Manitoba
G	1	Lexie Primus	5 ft 7 in (1.7 m)	Fr	North Knox High School	Bicknell, IN
G	2	Elena Bertrand	5 ft 5 in (1.65 m)	Sr	Virginia Academy	Bristow, VA
G	3	Taliah Lee	5 ft 11 in (1.8 m)	Sr	Gonzaga Prep; Mid-America Christian	Spokane, WA
G	5	Presly Samz	5 ft 7 in (1.7 m)	Fr	Arrowhead High School	Hartland, WI
G	11	McKayla Miller	6 ft 1 in (1.85 m)	Sr	Cimarron High School; Tulsa	Cimarron, KS
G	12	Mia Smith	5 ft 6 in (1.68 m)	Sr	Little Rock Christian Academy; Mid-America Christian	Hensley, AR
G	13	Maris Zurliene	6 ft 1 in (1.85 m)	So	Mater Dei Catholic High School	Aviston, Illinois
G	14	Tess Wiczek	5 ft 7 in (1.7 m)	RS Fr	Pius XI High School	Greenfield, WI
G	15	Taylor Holt	6 ft 2 in (1.88 m)	RS So	East Hickman High School	Lyles, TN
G	20	Hannah Richardson	6 ft 1 in (1.85 m)	Jr	Hoosac School; St. Bonaventure	Auckland, New Zealand
G	21	Olivia Vinson	5 ft 10 in (1.78 m)	So	Coffee County Central High School	Manchester, TN
G	22	CC Quigley	6 ft 3 in (1.91 m)	Fr	Noblesville High School	Noblesville, IN
G	24	Hope Counts	6 ft 2 in (1.88 m)	So	Providence Academy	Crystal, MN

Head coach

- Lauren Sumski (Rhodes)

Assistant coach(es)

- Chris Sumski (St. Andrews)
- Sydney Shelton (Lipscomb)
- Bailey Pedigo (Campbellsville)
- Makenna Reed (Elizabethtown)

Legend

- (C) Team captain
- (S) Suspended
- (I) Ineligible
- (W) Walk-on
- Injured
- Current redshirt

Roster
Last update: July 20, 2026

== Schedule and results ==
Date time, TV	Rank^{#}	Opponent^{#}	Result	Record	High points	High rebounds	High assists	Site (attendance) city, state
Non-conference regular season
November 2, 2026*; 11:00 a.m., SECN+		at No. 8 Vanderbilt	L 53–112	0–1	16 – Miller	7 – Wiczek	4 – Bertrand	Memorial Gymnasium (7,023); Nashville, TN
November 5, 2026*; TBA		at Butler						Hinkle Fieldhouse; Indianapolis, IN
November 7, 2026*; TBA		Carolina						Allen Arena; Nashville, TN
November 12, 2026*; TBA		Mississippi Valley State						Allen Arena; Nashville, TN
November 15, 2026*; TBA		at Chattanooga						McKenzie Arena; Chattanooga, TN
November 23, 2026*; TBA		Tennessee Tech						Allen Arena; Nashville, TN
November 30, 2026*; TBA		at Middle Tennessee						Murphy Center; Murfreesboro, TN
December 3, 2026*; TBA		Belmont						Allen Arena; Nashville, TN
December 6, 2026*; TBA		at Georgia Tech						McCamish Pavilion; Atlanta, GA
December 14, 2026*; TBA		Samford						Allen Arena; Nashville, TN
December 16, 2026*; TBA		Austin Peay; ASUN/UAC Crossover						Allen Arena; Nashville, TN
December 19, 2026*; TBA		Eastern Kentucky; ASUN/UAC Crossover						Allen Arena; Nashville, TN
December 31, 2026*; TBA		at West Georgia; ASUN/UAC Crossover						The Coliseum; Carrollton, GA
January 2, 2027*; TBA		at North Alabama; ASUN/UAC Crossover						Flowers Hall; Florence, AL
ASUN regular season
January 9, 2027; TBA		at Bellarmine						Knights Hall; Louisville, KY
January 14, 2027; TBA		at Jacksonville						Swisher Gymnasium; Jacksonville, FL
January 16, 2027; TBA		at North Florida						UNF Arena; Jacksonville, FL
January 21, 2027; TBA		Stetson						Allen Arena; Nashville, TN
January 23, 2027; TBA		Florida Gulf Coast						Allen Arena; Nashville, TN
January 28, 2027; TBA		West Florida						Allen Arena; Nashville, TN
January 30, 2027; TBA		Queens						Allen Arena; Nashville, TN
February 4, 2027; TBA		at Florida Gulf Coast						Alico Arena; Fort Myers, FL
February 6, 2027; TBA		at Stetson						Insight Credit Union Arena; DeLand, FL
February 11, 2027; TBA		North Florida						Allen Arena; Nashville, TN
February 13, 2027; TBA		Jacksonville						Allen Arena; Nashville, TN
February 20, 2027; TBA		Bellarmine						Allen Arena; Nashville, TN
February 25, 2027; TBA		at Queens						Curry Arena; Charlotte, NC
February 27, 2027; TBA		at West Florida						PenAir Field House; Pensacola, FL
ASUN tournament
March 4–8, 2027; TBA		vs.						VyStar Veterans Memorial Arena; FJacksonville, FL
*Non-conference game. ^{#}Rankings from AP Poll. (#) Tournament seedings in parentheses. All times are in Central.
