= Queens Royals women's basketball =

2026–27 Queens Royals women's basketball team
- University: Queens University of Charlotte
- Head coach: Jen Brown (6th season)
- Location: Charlotte, North Carolina
- Arena: Curry Arena (capacity: 2,500)
- Conference: ASUN Conference
- Nickname: Royals
- Colors: Navy blue and vegas gold

Conference regular-season champions
- Conference Carolinas: 2001

The Queens Royals women's basketball team represents the Queens University of Charlotte in Charlotte, North Carolina, United States. The Royals joined the NCAA Division I ASUN Conference on July 1, 2022, after nine seasons in the Division II South Atlantic Conference. After completing the NCAA's reclassifying process, the Royals are eligible to compete in the NCAA tournament and the WNIT from the 2025–26 season.

The team is currently led by fifth-year head coach Jen Brown and play their home games at Curry Arena.

== History ==
Queens fielded its first women's basketball team in the 1989–90 season; Cheryl Fielitz was the team's first head coach. They formerely played in the Conference Carolinas.

== Postseason results ==
=== NCAA Division II Tournament results ===
Queens never appeared in the NCAA Division II Tournament during their tenure in Division II.

== See also ==
- Queens Royals men's basketball
