= 2026–27 NC State Wolfpack women's basketball team =

Intercollegiate basketball season

2026–27 NC State Wolfpack women's basketball
- Conference: Atlantic Coast Conference
- Record: 5–1 (0–0 ACC)
- Head coach: Wes Moore (14th season)
- Associate head coach: Nikki West (7th season)
- Assistant coaches: Ashley Williams (5th season); Brittany Morris (5th season); Kevin Leatherwood (4th season); Kayla Jones (2nd season)
- Home arena: Reynolds Coliseum

2026–27 ACC women's basketball standings
	Conf.				Overall
Team	W		L	PCT	W		L	PCT
No. 3 Louisville	0	–	0	–	7	–	0	1.000
California	0	–	0	–	6	–	0	1.000
Florida State	0	–	0	–	6	–	0	1.000
Miami (FL)	0	–	0	–	6	–	0	1.000
Virginia	0	–	0	–	6	–	0	1.000
No. 5 Duke	0	–	0	–	5	–	0	1.000
No. 13 Notre Dame	0	–	0	–	5	–	0	1.000
Pittsburgh	0	–	0	–	5	–	0	1.000
Virginia Tech	0	–	0	–	5	–	0	1.000
Clemson	0	–	0	–	6	–	1	.857
Georgia Tech	0	–	0	–	5	–	1	.833
NC State	0	–	0	–	5	–	1	.833
SMU	0	–	0	–	5	–	1	.833
Syracuse	0	–	0	–	4	–	1	.800
Boston College	0	–	0	–	4	–	2	.667
Stanford	0	–	0	–	4	–	2	.667
Wake Forest	0	–	0	–	4	–	2	.667
No. 24 North Carolina	0	–	0	–	3	–	2	.600
† 2027 ACC tournament winner As of November 21, 2026; Rankings from AP Poll

The 2026–27 NC State Wolfpack women's basketball team will represent North Carolina State University (NC State) during the 2026–27 NCAA Division I women's basketball season. The Wolfpack, led by fourteenth-year head coach Wes Moore, will play their home games at Reynolds Coliseum in Raleigh, North Carolina and compete as a member of the Atlantic Coast Conference (ACC).

== Previous season ==
The Wolfpack finished the 2025–26 season 21–11 overall and 13–5 in ACC play, to finish in fourth place in the conference. As the No. 4 seed in the ACC tournament, they earned a bye to the quarterfinals, where they lost to No. 5 Notre Dame.

Following the loss, the Wolfpack received an at-large bid to the NCAA tournament, where they were seeded No. 7 in the Fort Worth #3 Regional. In the first round, they defeated No. 10 seed Tennessee, before losing to No. 2 seed and No. 9 nationally ranked Michigan to end their season.

== Offseason ==
=== Departures ===
NC State departures
Name	Number	Pos.	Height	Year	Hometown	Reason for departure
Devyn Quigley	0	Guard	5'11"	Sophomore	Manchester, NJ	Transferred to Penn State
Lorena Awou	1	Center	6'5"	Sophomore	East Moline, IL	Transferred to Baylor
Zamareya Jones	3	Guard	5'7"	Sophomore	Bethel, NC	Transferred to Louisville
Tilda Trygger	18	Forward	6'6"	Sophomore	Stockholm, Sweden	Transferred to Washington
Mallory Collier	42	Center	6'3"	Junior	Millington, TN	Transferred to South Florida

=== Incoming transfers ===
NC State incoming transfers
Name	Number	Pos.	Height	Year	Hometown	Previous school
Desiree Wooten	3	Guard	5'8"	Senior	Dallas, TX	Colorado
Khady Leye	6	Forward	6'2"	Junior	Louga, Senegal	Auburn
Audrey Ericksen	21	Guard	6'0"	Senior	Cary, NC	Boston University

=== Recruiting class ===
College recruiting
Name	Hometown	School	Height	Weight	Commit date
Kamora Pruitt; F	DeSoto, TX	Legion Prep Academy	6 ft 2 in (1.88 m)	N/A	Nov 14, 2025
Kamora Pruitt; F	Recruit ratings: Rivals: 247Sports: ESPN: (94)				
Annsley Trivette; F	Abingdon, VA	Abingdon High School	6 ft 3 in (1.91 m)	N/A	Nov 12, 2025
Annsley Trivette; F	Recruit ratings: Rivals: 247Sports: ESPN: (92)				
Overall recruit ranking:
Note: In many cases, Scout, Rivals, 247Sports, On3, and ESPN may conflict in their listings of height and weight.; In these cases, the average was taken. ESPN grades are on a 100-point scale.; Sources:

== Roster ==
Years are listed according to the new NCAA age-based eligibility model.

2026–27 NC State Wolfpack women's basketball team
Players
Coaches

Pos.	#	Name	Height	Year	Previous school	Hometown
G	2	Qadence Samuels	6 ft 0 in (1.83 m)	Sr	Bishop McNamara High School; UConn	Forestville, MD
G	3	Desiree Wooten (5th)	5 ft 8 in (1.73 m)	GS	Mansfield Timberview High School; Colorado	Dallas, TX
F	5	Annsley Trivette	6 ft 3 in (1.91 m)	Fr	Abingdon High School	Abingdon, VA
F	6	Khady Leye	6 ft 2 in (1.88 m)	Jr	SPIRE Academy; Auburn	Louga, Senegal
G	7	Ky'She Lunan	5 ft 10 in (1.78 m)	So	Millennium High School	Goodyear, AZ
G	10	Adelaide Jernigan	5 ft 7 in (1.7 m)	So	Bishop McGuinness Catholic High School	Winston-Salem, NC
F	11	Maddie Cox	6 ft 2 in (1.88 m)	Sr	Flower Mound High School	Flower Mound, TX
F	12	Khamil Pierre	6 ft 2 in (1.88 m)	Sr	Perry High School; Vanderbilt	Phoenix, AZ
G	21	Audrey Ericksen	6 ft 0 in (1.83 m)	Sr	Green Level High School; Boston University	Cary, NC
G	24	Kamora Pruitt	6 ft 2 in (1.88 m)	Fr	Legion Prep Academy (TX)	St. Louis, MO
G	35	Zoe Brooks	5 ft 10 in (1.78 m)	Sr	St. John Vianney	Plainfield, NJ
F	77	Favour Ossai	6 ft 2 in (1.88 m)	Fr	Fukushima Toryo (Japan)	Delta State, Nigeria

Head coach

- Wes Moore (Johnson)

Assistant coach(es)

- Kikki West (Clemson)
- Ashley Williams (NC State)
- Brittany Morris (Seton Hall)
- Kevin Leatherwood (Carson–Newman)
- Kayla Jones (NC State)

Legend

- (C) Team captain
- (S) Suspended
- (I) Ineligible
- (W) Walk-on
- Injured
- Current redshirt

Roster

== Schedule and results ==
Date time, TV	Rank^{#}	Opponent^{#}	Result	Record	High points	High rebounds	High assists	Site (attendance) city, state
Exhibition
October 8, 2026*; 6:00 p.m.		High Point	W 72–53		19 – Pierre	12 – Pierre	3 – Tied	Reynolds Coliseum (1,200); Raleigh, NC
October 24, 2026*; 3:00 p.m.	No. 25	UNC Wilmington	W 75–40		27 – Pierre	10 – Samuels	6 – Trivette	Reynolds Coliseum (1,200); Raleigh, NC
Regular season
November 2, 2026*; 5:00 p.m., ACCNX	No. 25	Wofford	W 80–50	1–0	23 – Brooks	11 – Pierre	6 – Brooks	Reynolds Coliseum (4,743); Raleigh, NC
November 4, 2026*; 6:00 p.m., ACCN	No. 25	Campbell	W 80–45	2–0	21 – Pierre	11 – Pierre	5 – Tied	Reynolds Coliseum (4,912); Raleigh, NC
November 8, 2026*; 3:00 p.m., ESPN2	No. 25	vs. No. 14 Kentucky; Ally Tipoff	L 78–93	2–1	34 – Pierre	6 – Samuels	5 – Wooten	Spectrum Center; Charlotte, NC
November 11, 2026*; 7:00 p.m., ACCNX		Liberty	W 71–47	3–1	19 – Pierre	11 – Samuels	3 – Wooten	Reynolds Coliseum (4,729); Raleigh, NC
November 15, 2026*; 1:00 p.m., ESPN+		at Seton Hall	W 75–54	4–1	–	–	–	Walsh Gymnasium; South Orange, NJ
November 19, 2026*; 7:00 p.m., ACCNX		Georgetown	W 74–43	5–1	–	–	–	Reynolds Coliseum; Raleigh, NC
November 22, 2026*; 3:00 p.m., ACCN		Coastal Carolina						Reynolds Coliseum; Raleigh, NC
November 27, 2026*; 7:00 p.m., ION		vs. Kansas State; Fort Myers Tip-Off Island Division						Suncoast Credit Union Arena; Fort Myers, FL
November 28, 2026*; 4:30 p.m., ION		vs. LSU; Fort Myers Tip-Off Island Division						Suncoast Credit Union Arena; Fort Myers, FL
December 2, 2026*; 7:15 p.m., ESPNU		at Ole Miss; ACC–SEC Challenge						SJB Pavilion; Oxford, MS
December 6, 2026*; 6:00 p.m., ACCN		Davidson						Reynolds Coliseum; Raleigh, NC
December 9, 2026*; 7:00 p.m., ACCNX		Jacksonville						Reynolds Coliseum; Raleigh, NC
December 13, 2026; 6:00 p.m., ESPN		at North Carolina; Rivalry						Carmichael Arena; Chapel Hill, NC
December 17, 2026; 6:00 p.m., ACCNX		at Florida State						Donald L. Tucker Civic Center; Tallahassee, FL
December 20, 2026*; 12:00 p.m., ACCN		Navy						Reynolds Coliseum; Raleigh, NC
December 31, 2026; 2:00 p.m., ACCNX		Miami (FL)						Reynolds Coliseum; Raleigh, NC
January 3, 2027; 3:00 p.m., ESPN		Duke						Reynolds Coliseum; Raleigh, NC
January 7, 2027; 9:00 p.m., ACCNX		at California						Haas Pavilion; Berkeley, CA
January 10, 2027; 2:00 p.m., ACCN		at Stanford						Maples Pavilion; Stanford, CA
January 14, 2027; 7:00 p.m., ACCNX		Virgnia Tech						Reynolds Coliseum; Raleigh, NC
January 18, 2027; 4:00 p.m., ESPN2		at Georgia Tech						McCamish Pavilion; Atlanta, GA
January 24, 2027; 12:00 p.m., ACCN		Wake Forest						Reynolds Coliseum; Raleigh, NC
January 28, 2027; 7:30 p.m., ACCNX		at SMU						Moody Coliseum; University Park, TX
February 1, 2027; 6:00 p.m., ESPN2		Virginia; Play4Kay						Reynolds Coliseum; Raleigh, NC
February 4, 2027; 7:00 p.m., ACCNX		Pittsburgh						Reynolds Coliseum; Raleigh, NC
February 7, 2027; 12:00 p.m., ACCN		at Syracuse						JMA Wireless Dome; Syracuse, NY
February 11, 2027; 7:00 p.m., ACCNX		Boston College						Reynolds Coliseum; Raleigh, NC
February 18, 2027; 8:00 p.m., ESPN2		Notre Dame						Reynolds Coliseum; Raleigh, NC
February 21, 2027; 2:00 p.m., ESPN		at Louisville						KFC Yum! Center; Louisville, KY
February 25, 2027; 6:00 p.m., ACCNX		at Wake Forest						LJVM Coliseum; Winston-Salem, NC
February 28, 2027; 12:00 p.m., The CW		Clemson						Reynolds Coliseum; Raleigh, NC
*Non-conference game. ^{#}Rankings from AP Poll. (#) Tournament seedings in parentheses. All times are in Eastern.

== Rankings ==
Ranking movements Legend: ██ Increase in ranking ██ Decrease in ranking RV = Received votes
	Week																				
Poll	Pre	1	2	3	4	5	6	7	8	9	10	11	12	13	14	15	16	17	18	19	Final
AP	25	RV																			
Coaches	25	RV																			
