= 2026–27 Miami Hurricanes women's basketball team =

Intercollegiate basketball season

2026–27 Miami Hurricanes women's basketball
- Conference: Atlantic Coast Conference
- Record: 6–0 (0–0 ACC)
- Head coach: Tricia Cullop (3rd season)
- Associate head coach: Jessie Ivey; Gene Hill
- Assistant coaches: Danielle Page; Barbara Ferris
- Home arena: Watsco Center

2026–27 ACC women's basketball standings
	Conf.				Overall
Team	W		L	PCT	W		L	PCT
No. 3 Louisville	0	–	0	–	7	–	0	1.000
California	0	–	0	–	6	–	0	1.000
Florida State	0	–	0	–	6	–	0	1.000
Miami (FL)	0	–	0	–	6	–	0	1.000
Virginia	0	–	0	–	6	–	0	1.000
No. 5 Duke	0	–	0	–	5	–	0	1.000
No. 13 Notre Dame	0	–	0	–	5	–	0	1.000
Pittsburgh	0	–	0	–	5	–	0	1.000
Virginia Tech	0	–	0	–	5	–	0	1.000
Clemson	0	–	0	–	6	–	1	.857
Georgia Tech	0	–	0	–	5	–	1	.833
NC State	0	–	0	–	5	–	1	.833
SMU	0	–	0	–	5	–	1	.833
Syracuse	0	–	0	–	4	–	1	.800
Boston College	0	–	0	–	4	–	2	.667
Stanford	0	–	0	–	4	–	2	.667
Wake Forest	0	–	0	–	4	–	2	.667
No. 24 North Carolina	0	–	0	–	3	–	2	.600
† 2027 ACC tournament winner As of November 21, 2026; Rankings from AP Poll

The 2026–27 Miami Hurricanes women's basketball team currently represent the University of Miami during the 2026–27 NCAA Division I women's basketball season. The Hurricanes, led by third-year head coach Tricia Cullop, play their home games at the Watsco Center in Coral Gables, Florida and compete as a member of the Atlantic Coast Conference (ACC).

== Previous season ==
The Hurricanes finished the 2025–26 season 18–15 overall and 8–10 in ACC play, to finish in a tie for eleventh place in the conference with Georgia Tech and Stanford. As the No. 12 seed in the ACC tournament, they beat No. 13 Stanford in overtime 83–76 in the first round, but fell to No. 5 Notre Dame in the second round.

Following their tournament elimination, the Hurricanes earned an at-large bid to the WBIT for the first time, making their first postseason appearance since 2023 when the team went on an unprecedented run to the Elite Eight as a No. 9 seed in the NCAA tournament. They were seeded No. 2 in the Utah Bracket. They defeated unseeded Georgia Southern in the first round before falling to eventual semifinalists No. 3 Wisconsin in the second round.

== Offseason ==
=== Departures ===
Miami departures
Name	Num.	Pos.	Height	Year	Hometown	Reason for departure
Ra Shaya Kyle	0	Center	6'6"	Graduate student	Marion, IN	Graduated; went undrafted in the 2026 WNBA draft, signed a training camp contract with the Minnesota Lynx
Camille Williams	1	Guard	5'11"	Freshman	Fort Worth, TX	Transferred to TCU
Candace Kpetikou	4	Center	6'3"	(redshirt) Sophomore	Niamey, Niger	Transferred to UCF
Danielle Osho	7	Forward	6'1"	Freshman	Dacula, GA	Transferred to Auburn
Mya Kone	8	Forward	6'2"	Junior	Pompano Beach, FL	Transferred to Middle Tennessee
Vittoria Blasigh	15	Guard	5'9"	Junior	Udine, Italy	Transferred to UCF
Simone Pelish	22	Guard	6'0"	(redshirt) Freshman	Poughkeepsie, NY	Transferred to Villanova
Meredith Tippner	23	Guard	5'10"	Freshman	Noblesville, IN	Transferred to High Point
Jessica Peterson	35	Forward	6'2"	Graduate student	Rancho Cucamonga, CA	Left team in December 2025, transferred to Auburn

=== Incoming transfers ===
Miami incoming transfers
Name	Num.	Pos.	Height	Year	Hometown	Previous school
Mya Herman	4	Guard	5'7"	Senior	Canandaigua, NY	Southeastern (NAIA)
Gianna Corbitt	22	Forward	6'1"	Junior	Oakland Park, FL	Chattanooga
Dayana Mendes	26	Guard/forward	6'3"	Junior	Paris, France	USC

=== Recruiting class ===
There was no 2026 recruiting class.

== Roster ==
2026–27 Miami Hurricanes women's basketball team
Players
Coaches

Pos.	#	Name	Height	Year	Previous school	Hometown
F	3	Soma Okolo	6 ft 1 in (1.85 m)	So	Glenn High School	Leander, TX
G	4	Mya Herman	5 ft 7 in (1.7 m)	Sr	Canandaigua Academy; Southeastern	Canandaigua, NY
G	5	Ahnay Adams	5 ft 6 in (1.68 m)	Jr	Tilton School	New Bedford, MA
F	12	Natalie Wetzel	6 ft 3 in (1.91 m)	So	Peters Township High School	McMurray, PA
C	13	Jess-Mine Zodia	6 ft 3 in (1.91 m)	Fr		Moissy-Cramayel, France
G	14	Gal Raviv	5 ft 9 in (1.75 m)	Jr	Bella Vista Prep; Quinnipiac	Netanya, Israel
F	17	Anna Liepina	6 ft 3 in (1.91 m)	Fr		Daugavpils, Latvia
G	18	Maja Uranker	6 ft 0 in (1.83 m)	Fr		Celje, Slovenia
F	22	Gianna Corbitt	6 ft 1 in (1.85 m)	Jr	Blanche Ely High School; Chattanooga	Oakland Park, FL
G/F	26	Dayana Mendes	6 ft 3 in (1.91 m)	Jr	INSEP; USC	Paris, France
G	33	Amarachi Kimpson	5 ft 8 in (1.73 m)	Sr	Little Elm High School; UNLV	Little Elm, TX

Head coach

- Tricia Cullop (Purdue)

Assistant coach(es)

- Jessie Ivey (West Florida)
- Gene Hill (Coker)
- Danielle Page (Nebraska)
- Barbara Ferris (Tulane)

Legend

- (C) Team captain
- (S) Suspended
- (I) Ineligible
- (W) Walk-on
- Injured
- Current redshirt

Roster
Last update: August 10, 2026

== Schedule and results ==
Date time, TV	Rank^{#}	Opponent^{#}	Result	Record	High points	High rebounds	High assists	Site (attendance) city, state
Exhibition
October 18, 2026*; 2:00 p.m.		Lynn	W 93–41		23 – Zodia	10 – Zodia	5 – Tied	Watsco Center; Coral Gables, FL
Regular season
November 2, 2026*; 7:00 p.m., ACCNX		Florida Atlantic	W 75–48	1–0	21 – Adams	10 – Corbitt	4 – Tied	Watsco Center (1,286); Coral Gables, FL
November 5, 2026*; 7:00 p.m., ACCNX		Jacksonville	W 79–63	2–0	17 – Raviv	7 – Wetzel	9 – Raviv	Watsco Center (1,172); Coral Gables, FL
November 8, 2026*; 2:00 p.m., ACCNX		Stetson	W 79–39	3–0	17 – Raviv	10 – Wetzel	4 – Adams	Watsco Center (1,266); Coral Gables, FL
November 12, 2026*; 7:00 p.m., ACCNX		Saint Peter's	W 78–46	4–0	14 – Adams	10 – Adams	6 – Raviv	Watsco Center; Coral Gables, FL
November 16, 2026*; 11:00 a.m., ACCNX		Le Moyne	W 87–40	5–0	16 – Mendes	7 – Raviv	10 – Raviv	Watsco Center (4,627); Coral Gables, FL
November 19, 2026*; 7:00 p.m., ACCNX		FIU	W 67–41	6–0	18 – Raviv	5 – Tied	6 – Raviv	Watsco Center (1,537); Coral Gables, FL
November 23, 2026*; 4:00 p.m., BDG Live		vs. Michigan; Baha Mar Pink Flamingo Championship						Baha Mar Convention Center; Nassau, Bahamas
November 25, 2026*; 4:00 p.m., BDG Live		vs. Utah; Baha Mar Pink Flamingo Championship						Baha Mar Convention Center; Nassau, Bahamas
November 29, 2026*; 2:00 p.m., ACCNX		Arkansas–Pine Bluff						Watsco Center; Coral Gables, FL
December 2, 2026*; 5:00 p.m., ESPNU		at Florida; ACC–SEC Challenge						O'Connell Center; Gainesville, FL
December 6, 2026*; 2:00 p.m., ACCNX		Stony Brook						Watsco Center; Coral Gables, FL
December 13, 2026; 2:00 p.m., The CW		at Louisville						KFC Yum! Center; Louisville, KY
December 16, 2026*; 9:30 p.m., ION		vs. USC; Scripps Sports Women's Basketball Showcase						Mortgage Matchup Center; Phoenix, AZ
December 20, 2026*; 2:00 p.m., ACCNX		Morgan State						Watsco Center; Coral Gables, FL
December 22, 2026; 12:00 p.m., ACCNX		Boston College						Watsco Center; Coral Gables, FL
December 28, 2026*; 7:00 p.m., ACCNX		Bethune–Cookman						Watsco Center; Coral Gables, FL
December 31, 2026; 2:00 p.m., ACCNX		at NC State						Reynolds Coliseum; Raleigh, NC
January 3, 2027; 6:00 p.m., ACC Network		Notre Dame						Watsco Center; Coral Gables, FL
January 7, 2027; 10:00 p.m., ACCNX		at Stanford						Maples Pavilion; Stanford, CA
January 10, 2027; 6:00 p.m., ACC Network		at California						Haas Pavilion; Berkeley, CA
January 14, 2027; 7:00 p.m., ACCNX		Virginia						Watsco Center; Coral Gables, FL
January 17, 2027; 2:00 p.m., ACCNX		Florida State						Watsco Center; Coral Gables, FL
January 21, 2027; 7:00 p.m., ACCNX		at Clemson						Littlejohn Coliseum; Clemson, SC
January 28, 2027; 6:00 p.m., ACCNX		at Syracuse						JMA Wireless Dome; Syracuse, NY
January 31, 2027; 12:00 p.m., ACC Network		SMU						Watsco Center; Coral Gables, FL
February 4, 2027; 7:00 p.m., ACCNX		North Carolina						Watsco Center; Coral Gables, FL
February 7, 2027; 2:00 p.m., The CW		at Duke						Cameron Indoor Stadium; Durham, NC
February 11, 2027; 7:00 p.m., ACCNX		Wake Forest						Watsco Center; Coral Gables, FL
February 14, 2027; 2:00 p.m., ACCNX		at Florida State						Donald L. Tucker Civic Center; Tallahassee, FL
February 21, 2027; 2:00 p.m., ACCNX		at Pittsburgh						Petersen Events Center; Pittsburgh, PA
February 25, 2027; 7:00 p.m., ACCNX		Virginia Tech						Watsco Center; Coral Gables, FL
February 28, 2027; 2:00 p.m., ACCNX		Georgia Tech						Watsco Center; Coral Gables, FL
*Non-conference game. ^{#}Rankings from AP Poll. (#) Tournament seedings in parentheses. All times are in Eastern.
