= 2026–27 Louisville Cardinals women's basketball team =

Intercollegiate basketball season

2026–27 Louisville Cardinals women's basketball
- Conference: Atlantic Coast Conference

Ranking
- Coaches: No. 3
- AP: No. 3
- Record: 8–0 (0–0 ACC)
- Head coach: Jeff Walz (20th season)
- Associate head coach: Jonneshia Pineda
- Assistant coaches: Joanna Bernabei-McNamee; Mike Bradbury; Selim Aldag
- Home arena: KFC Yum! Center

2026–27 ACC women's basketball standings
	Conf.				Overall
Team	W		L	PCT	W		L	PCT
No. 3 Louisville	0	–	0	–	7	–	0	1.000
California	0	–	0	–	6	–	0	1.000
Florida State	0	–	0	–	6	–	0	1.000
Miami (FL)	0	–	0	–	6	–	0	1.000
Virginia	0	–	0	–	6	–	0	1.000
No. 5 Duke	0	–	0	–	5	–	0	1.000
No. 13 Notre Dame	0	–	0	–	5	–	0	1.000
Pittsburgh	0	–	0	–	5	–	0	1.000
Virginia Tech	0	–	0	–	5	–	0	1.000
Clemson	0	–	0	–	6	–	1	.857
Georgia Tech	0	–	0	–	5	–	1	.833
NC State	0	–	0	–	5	–	1	.833
SMU	0	–	0	–	5	–	1	.833
Syracuse	0	–	0	–	4	–	1	.800
Boston College	0	–	0	–	4	–	2	.667
Stanford	0	–	0	–	4	–	2	.667
Wake Forest	0	–	0	–	4	–	2	.667
No. 24 North Carolina	0	–	0	–	3	–	2	.600
† 2027 ACC tournament winner As of November 22, 2026; Rankings from AP Poll

The 2026–27 Louisville Cardinals women's basketball team currently represents the University of Louisville during the 2026–27 NCAA Division I women's basketball season. The Cardinals, led by twentieth-year head coach Jeff Walz, play their home games at the KFC Yum! Center in Louisville, Kentucky, and compete as a member of the Atlantic Coast Conference (ACC).

== Previous season ==
The Cardinals finished the 2025–26 season 29–8 overall and 15–3 in ACC play, to finish second in the conference. As the No. 2 seed in the ACC tournament, they earned a double-bye to the quarterfinals, where they routed No. 7 Syracuse 87–61. They then moved on to the semifinals, where they defeated No. 3. North Carolina to advance to the championship game. They were unable to capture the ACC title, as they ultimately fell to top-seeded and reigning tournament champions Duke 70–65 in overtime.

Following the ACC tournament, the Cardinals earned an at-large bid to the NCAA tournament, where they were seeded No. 3 in the Fort Worth #3 Regional. They defeated No. 14 Vermont 72–52 in the first round and pulled off a 69–68 win over Alabama to advance to the Sweet Sixteen. They could not move on to the Elite Eight, as they would fall to No. 2 Michigan by a score of 52–71 to end their season.

== Offseason ==
=== Departures ===
Louisville departures
Name	Number	Pos.	Height	Year	Hometown	Reason for departure
Laura Ziegler	0	Forward	6'2"	Senior	Herlev, Denmark	Graduated; went undrafted in the 2026 WNBA draft, signed a player development contract with the Los Angeles Sparks
Reyna Scott	1	Guard	5'10"	Senior	New York, NY	Graduated
Anaya Hardy	9	Forward	6'3"	Sophomore	Detroit, MI	Transferred to Notre Dame
Yevheniia Putra	12	Forward	6'3"	Freshman	Kyiv, Ukraine	TBD; not listed on roster
Isla Juffermans	13	Forward	6'4"	Sophomore	Coffs Harbour, Australia	Transferred to Charleston (Note: Did not play in the 2025–26 season.)
Peyton Bradley	20	Guard	5'9"	Freshman	Brandenburg, KY	Transferred to UAB
Skylar Jones	23	Guard	6'0"	Junior	Chicago, IL	Left team, transferred to Baylor

=== Incoming transfers ===
Louisville incoming transfers
Name	Number	Pos.	Height	Year	Hometown	Previous school
Zamareya Jones	3	Guard	5'7"	Junior	Greenville, NC	NC State
Carys Baker	10	Forward	6'2"	Senior	West Hartford, CT	Virginia
Amiya Joyner	12	Forward	6'2"	5th Year (Note: Joyner is currently eligible, pending litigation, to play a final year in the 2026–27 season following a preliminary injunction granted in a Louisiana lawsuit challenging the NCAA’s new age-based eligibility model, which excluded the class of 2022. Joyner also previously signed with and competed in the UpShot League in April, playing for the Greensboro Groove before departing the team mid-season to return to the NCAA.)	Farmville, NC	LSU
Deniya Prawl	25	Guard	6'2"	Sophomore	Toronto, Ontario	Tennessee

=== Recruiting class ===
College recruiting
Name	Hometown	School	Height	Weight	Commit date
Ariyana Cradle; PG	Westerville, OH	SPIRE Academy	5 ft 8 in (1.73 m)	N/A	
Ariyana Cradle; PG	Recruit ratings: Rivals: 247Sports: ESPN: (95)				
Myah Epps; G	Fort Wayne, IN	Homestead Senior High School	5 ft 10 in (1.78 m)	N/A	
Myah Epps; G	Recruit ratings: Rivals: 247Sports: ESPN: (93)				
Overall recruit ranking: ESPN: 19
Note: In many cases, Scout, Rivals, 247Sports, On3, and ESPN may conflict in their listings of height and weight.; In these cases, the average was taken. ESPN grades are on a 100-point scale.; Sources: "2026 Player Commits". ESPN. Archived from the original on August 10, 2026.

== Roster ==
Years are listed according to the new NCAA age-based eligibility model.

2026–27 Louisville Cardinals women's basketball team
Players
Coaches

Pos.	#	Name	Height	Year	Previous school	Hometown
G	1	Myah Epps	5 ft 10 in (1.78 m)	Fr	Homestead Senior High School	Fort Wayne, IN
G	2	Imari Berry	5 ft 10 in (1.78 m)	Jr	Clarksville High School	Clarksville, TN
G	3	Zamareya Jones	5 ft 7 in (1.7 m)	Jr	North Pitt High School; NC State	Greenville, NC
F	4	Mackenly Randolph	6 ft 0 in (1.83 m)	Jr	Sierra Canyon School	Los Angeles, CA
G	5	Ariyana Cradle	5 ft 10 in (1.78 m)	Fr	SPIRE Academy	Westerville, OH
F	10	Carys Baker	6 ft 2 in (1.88 m)	Sr	Loomis Chaffee School; Virginia Tech	West Hartford, CT
F	11	Elif İstanbulluoğlu	6 ft 3 in (1.91 m)	Jr	Fenerbahçe S.K.	Istanbul, Turkey
F	12	Amiya Joyner (5th)	6 ft 2 in (1.88 m)	Sr	Farmville Central High School; LSU	Farmville, NC
G	15	Rebekah Graves	5 ft 6 in (1.68 m)	Jr	Keller High School	Keller, TX
G	21	Reagan Bender	5 ft 10 in (1.78 m)	Jr	Sacred Heart Academy	Louisville, KY
G	22	Tajianna Roberts	5 ft 10 in (1.78 m)	Jr	IMG Academy	San Diego, CA
F	23	Ayse Melek Dermier	6 ft 4 in (1.93 m)	Fr	Ocean College	Istanbul, Turkey
F	24	Grace Mbugua	6 ft 4 in (1.93 m)	So	Danville Christian Academy	Danville, KY
G	25	Deniya Prawl	6 ft 2 in (1.88 m)	So	IMG Academy; Tennessee	Toronto, ON

Head coach

- Jeff Walz (Northern Kentucky)

Assistant coach(es)

- Jonneshia Pineda (Georgia Southwestern State)
- Joanna Bernabei-McNamee (West Liberty)
- Mike Bradbury (Chattanooga)
- Selim Aldag

Legend

- (C) Team captain
- (S) Suspended
- (I) Ineligible
- (W) Walk-on
- (5th) Fifth-year senior
- Injured
- Current redshirt

Roster
Last update: November 13, 2026

== Schedule and results ==
Date time, TV	Rank^{#}	Opponent^{#}	Result	Record	High points	High rebounds	High assists	Site (attendance) city, state
Regular season
November 2, 2026*; 5:00 p.m., ACCNX	No. 7	Bellarmine	W 119–47	1–0	15 – Roberts	6 – Cradle	9 – Jones	KFC Yum! Center (7,075); Louisville, KY
November 4, 2026*; 8:00 p.m., ACCN	No. 7	Stetson	W 87–35	2–0	16 – Berry	14 – Joyner	4 – Tied	KFC Yum! Center (6,696); Louisville, KY
November 8, 2026*; 4:00 p.m., ESPN+	No. 7	at Southern Indiana	W 80–57	3–0	20 – Roberts	9 – Joyner	6 – Jones	Liberty Arena (1,332); Evansville, IN
November 10, 2026*; 7:00 p.m., ACCNX	No. 7	Lindenwood	W 71–35	4–0	15 – Roberts	10 – Joyner	7 – Berry	KFC Yum! Center (6,731); Louisville, KY
November 12, 2026*; 8:00 p.m., CBSSN	No. 7	at Ball State	W 94–73	5–0	22 – Berry	6 – Berry	9 – Jones	Worthen Arena (2,651); Muncie, IN
November 15, 2026*; 5:30 p.m., ESPN	No. 7	No. 4 UConn	W 69–51	6–0	21 – Berry	9 – Tied	5 – Jones	KFC Yum! Center (12,692); Louisville, KY
November 17, 2026*; 6:00 p.m., ACCNX	No. 3	Tennessee State	W 88–39	7–0	20 – Berry	10 – Mbugua	5 – Jones	KFC Yum! Center (6,925); Louisville, KY
November 21, 2026*; 11:30 p.m., GNAC Network	No. 3	vs. Alaska Anchorage; Great Alaska Shootout semifinals	W 113–40	8–0	19 – Istanbulluoglu	10 – Randolph	12 – Jones	Alaska Airlines Center (2,342); Anchorage, AK
November 22, 2026*; 6:00 p.m., GNAC Network	No. 3	vs. Seattle; Great Alaska Shootout championship game						Alaska Airlines Center; Anchorage, AK
November 27, 2026*; 12:00 p.m., ACCNX		Akron						KFC Yum! Center; Louisville, KY
November 29, 2026*; 12:00 p.m., ACCNX		East Tennessee State						KFC Yum! Center; Louisville, KY
December 2, 2026*; 9:15 p.m., ESPN2		at Texas; ACC–SEC Challenge						Moody Center; Austin, TX
December 6, 2026*; 4:00 p.m., ACCNX		Eastern Kentucky						KFC Yum! Center; Louisville, KY
December 9, 2026*; 9:00 p.m., ESPN		at Kentucky; Rivalry						Rupp Arena; Lexington, KY
December 13, 2026; 2:00 p.m., CW		Miami (FL)						KFC Yum! Center; Louisville, KY
December 17, 2026*; 7:00 p.m., ACCNX		Northern Kentucky						KFC Yum! Center; Louisville, KY
December 20, 2026; 5:30 p.m., ESPN2		Clemson						KFC Yum! Center; Louisville, KY
December 31, 2026; 12:00 p.m., ACCNX		at Boston College						Conte Forum; Chestnut Hill, MA
January 3, 2027; 2:00 p.m., ACCN		California						KFC Yum! Center; Louisville, KY
January 7, 2027; 6:00 p.m., ACCN		at Florida State						Donald L. Tucker Civic Center; Tallahassee, FL
January 10, 2027; 3:00 p.m., ESPN/2		North Carolina						KFC Yum! Center; Louisville, KY
January 14, 2027; 7:00 p.m., ACCNX		at Pittsburgh						Petersen Events Center; Pittsburgh, PA
January 17, 2027; 2:00 p.m., CW		at Virginia Tech						Cassell Coliseum; Blacksburg, VA
January 21, 2027; 7:00 p.m., ESPN		Notre Dame						KFC Yum! Center; Louisville, KY
January 24, 2027; 2:00 p.m., CW		at SMU						Moody Coliseum; University Park, TX
January 28, 2027; 7:00 p.m., ACCNX		Stanford						KFC Yum! Center; Louisville, KY
February 4, 2027; 6:00 p.m., ACCNX		at Wake Forest						LJVM Coliseum; Winston-Salem, NC
February 7, 2027; 2:00 p.m., ESPN/2		at Virginia						John Paul Jones Arena; Charlottesville, VA
February 11, 2027; 6:00 p.m., ACCN		Syracuse						KFC Yum! Center; Louisville, KY
February 14, 2027; 2:00 p.m., ACCNX		Georgia Tech						KFC Yum! Center; Louisville, KY
February 18, 2027; 7:00 p.m., ESPN		at Duke						Cameron Indoor Stadium; Durham, NC
February 21, 2027; 2:00 p.m., ESPN		NC State						KFC Yum! Center; Louisville, KY
February 28, 2027; 12:00 p.m., ESPN		at Notre Dame						Joyce Center; South Bend, IN
*Non-conference game. ^{#}Rankings from AP Poll. (#) Tournament seedings in parentheses. All times are in Eastern.

== Rankings ==
Ranking movements Legend: ██ Increase in ranking ██ Decrease in ranking
	Week																				
Poll	Pre	1	2	3	4	5	6	7	8	9	10	11	12	13	14	15	16	17	18	19	Final
AP	7	7	3																		
Coaches	7	7	3																		
