= Palm Beach Atlantic Sailfish =

Intercollegiate sports teams of Palm Beach Atlantic University

Coordinates: 26.7036016°N 80.0513967°W

- University: Palm Beach Atlantic University
- Conference: Sunshine State (primary)
- NCAA: Division II
- Athletic director: Courtney Lovely Evans
- Location: West Palm Beach, Florida
- Varsity teams: 20 (8 men's, 10 women's, 2 co-ed)
- Basketball arena: Rubin Arena
- Baseball stadium: J. M. "Jake" Rubin Park
- Softball stadium: Simpson Field
- Soccer stadium: PBA Soccer/Lacrosse Field
- Lacrosse stadium: PBA Soccer/Lacrosse Field
- Tennis venue: Mitch Gornto Tennis Center
- Mascot: Sailfish Jack
- Nickname: Sailfish
- Colors: Navy Blue and White
- Website: pbasailfish.com

The Palm Beach Atlantic Sailfish are the athletic teams that represent Palm Beach Atlantic University, located in West Palm Beach, Florida, in intercollegiate sports as a member of the NCAA Division II ranks, primarily competing in the Sunshine State Conference (SSC) since the 2015–16 academic year for most their sports (achieving D-II full member status in 2016–17); while its men's and women's track & field teams compete as NCAA D-II Independents as the conference does not sponsor these sports. The Sailfish previously competed as an NCAA D-II Independent from 2003–04 to 2014–15; and in the Florida Sun Conference (FSC; now currently known as the Sun Conference since the 2008–09 school year) of the National Association of Intercollegiate Athletics (NAIA) from 1990–91 to 2002–03. The school's colors are navy blue and white.

== Varsity teams ==
Men's sports	Women's sports
Baseball	Basketball
Basketball	Beach Volleyball
Cross Country	Cross Country
Golf	Golf
Lacrosse	Lacrosse
Soccer	Soccer
Tennis	Softball
Track	Tennis
	Track
	Volleyball

Palm Beach Atlantic competes in 18 intercollegiate varsity sports: Men's sports include baseball, basketball, cross country, golf, lacrosse, soccer, tennis and track & field; while women's sports include basketball, beach volleyball, cross country, golf, lacrosse, soccer, softball, tennis, track & field and volleyball.

== Facilities ==
The new Marshall and Vera Lea Rinker Athletic Campus has facilities for beach volleyball, soccer, lacrosse, baseball, softball, tennis, and running trails as well as a new state of the art weight and training rooms. The new 34,000 sq ft (3,200 m^{2}) building houses locker rooms, meeting rooms as well as athletic offices.

=== Greene Complex for Sports and Recreation ===
The Greene is home to the Sailfish men's and women's basketball teams and the volleyball team. It's also the training and treatment center for other PBA athletic teams. There are four locker rooms located in the building, along with a unique team room just off the Rubin Arena floor. Staff members for the athletic department and campus recreation department call this building home.

=== Rubin Arena ===
This 2,000-seat arena is the home of the Sailfish men's and women's basketball teams, as well as the women's volleyball team. The Rubin Arena has two levels of seating that surround the main floor that feature a full-length basketball court for varsity contests, the ability to occupy two volleyball courts, as well as auxiliary basketball goals that lower from the ceiling. This multi-use facility also is equipped with an electrically lowered batting cage in the west mezzanine that can be used for off-season training for the Sailfish baseball and softball teams. The arena also features a unique side room known as "The Team Room" where various athletic teams gather either during games (pregame, halftime, etc.) or for film-review or devotional times as a part of their practice sessions.

=== Mitch Gornto Tennis Center ===
The Palm Beach Atlantic men's and women's tennis teams play in the Mitch Gornto Tennis Center. The center has 13 fully lighted courts with shaded seating available in multiple sections of the facility.
