= 2027 NCAA Division I women's basketball tournament =

American collegiate basketball tournament

- Season: 2026–27
- Teams: 76
- Finals site: Nationwide Arena, Columbus, Ohio

The 2027 NCAA Division I women's basketball tournament will involve a total of 76 teams in a single-elimination tournament to determine the National Collegiate Athletic Association (NCAA) Division I college basketball national champion for the 2026–27 NCAA Division I women's basketball season. The 45th edition of the tournament is scheduled to begin on March 17, 2027, and will conclude with the championship game on April 4, at the Nationwide Arena in Columbus, Ohio. This tournament will mark the introduction of the Opening Round and an expansion of the field of participants from 68 teams to 76.

== Tournament procedure ==
A total of 76 teams will enter the 2027 tournament, a change from 68 in previous years. 32 automatic bids are awarded to each program that won its conference's tournament. The remaining 44 teams will receive at-large bids, with selections extended by the NCAA selection committee on Selection Sunday scheduled for March 14. The selection committee will also seed the entire field from 1 to 76.

In a change from past practice, the top 16 teams in the committee's ranking will be bracketed solely by their ranking, without regard to conference affiliation. This change affects only the women's tournament.

In all, 24 teams (the 12 lowest-seeded automatic qualifiers and the 12 lowest-seeded at-large teams) play in the March Madness Opening Round. The winners of these games will advance to the main tournament bracket.

== Schedule and venues ==
Opening Round

- March 17 and 18

Subregionals (First and Second Rounds)

- March 19 and 20 (Fri/Sat)
- March 21 and 22 (Sun/Mon)

Regional semifinals and finals (Sweet Sixteen and Elite Eight)

- March 26–29
  - Xfinity Mobile Arena, Philadelphia, Pennsylvania (Host: Saint Joseph's University)
  - T-Mobile Arena, Las Vegas, Nevada (Note: The arena is located outside the Las Vegas city limits in the community of Paradise. All locations in Paradise have a Las Vegas mailing address.) (Host: University of Nevada, Las Vegas)

National semifinals and finals (Final Four and National Championship)

- April 2 and 4
  - Nationwide Arena, Columbus, Ohio (Host: Ohio State University)

Columbus will host the final four for the second time, having previously hosted in 2018.

== Media coverage ==
=== Television ===
ESPN broadcast each game of the tournament across either ESPN, ESPN2, ESPNU, ESPNEWS, or ABC. For the 5th consecutive season, the national championship game will air on ABC.

=== Radio ===
Westwood One will serve as radio broadcaster of the tournament.

== See also ==
- 2027 NCAA Division I men's basketball tournament
