= 2026–27 North Carolina Tar Heels women's basketball team =

Intercollegiate basketball season

2026–27 North Carolina Tar Heels women's basketball
- Conference: Atlantic Coast Conference

Ranking
- Coaches: No. 24
- AP: No. 24
- Record: 4–2 (0–0 ACC)
- Head coach: Courtney Banghart (8th season)
- Associate head coach: Joanne Aluka-White
- Assistant coaches: Cory McNeill; Katherine Bixby; Daniel Metzelfeld; Lexi Weger
- Home arena: Carmichael Arena

2026–27 ACC women's basketball standings
	Conf.				Overall
Team	W		L	PCT	W		L	PCT
No. 3 Louisville	0	–	0	–	7	–	0	1.000
California	0	–	0	–	6	–	0	1.000
Florida State	0	–	0	–	6	–	0	1.000
Miami (FL)	0	–	0	–	6	–	0	1.000
Virginia	0	–	0	–	6	–	0	1.000
No. 5 Duke	0	–	0	–	5	–	0	1.000
No. 13 Notre Dame	0	–	0	–	5	–	0	1.000
Pittsburgh	0	–	0	–	5	–	0	1.000
Virginia Tech	0	–	0	–	5	–	0	1.000
Clemson	0	–	0	–	6	–	1	.857
Georgia Tech	0	–	0	–	5	–	1	.833
NC State	0	–	0	–	5	–	1	.833
SMU	0	–	0	–	5	–	1	.833
Syracuse	0	–	0	–	4	–	1	.800
Boston College	0	–	0	–	4	–	2	.667
Stanford	0	–	0	–	4	–	2	.667
Wake Forest	0	–	0	–	4	–	2	.667
No. 24 North Carolina	0	–	0	–	3	–	2	.600
† 2027 ACC tournament winner As of November 21, 2026; Rankings from AP Poll

The 2026–27 North Carolina Tar Heels women's basketball team currently represents the University of North Carolina at Chapel Hill during the 2026–27 NCAA Division I women's basketball season. The Tar Heels, led by eighth-year head coach Courtney Banghart, play their home games at Carmichael Arena in Chapel Hill, North Carolina, and compete as a member of the Atlantic Coast Conference (ACC).

== Previous season ==
The Tar Heels finished the 2025–26 season 28–8 overall and 14–4 in ACC play, to finish in third place in the conference. As the No. 3 seed in the ACC tournament, they earned a double-bye to the quarterfinals, where they routed No. 6 Virginia Tech 85–68 to advance to the semifinals. They could not advance to the finals, as they lost to top-seeded Duke. Earlier in March, the Tar Heels had handed the Blue Devils their second conference loss by defeating them 74–69 at home on Senior Day.

Following the ACC tournament elimination, the Tar Heels earned an at-large bid to the NCAA tournament, seeded No. 4 in the Fort Worth #1 Regional. In the first and second rounds respectively, they defeated No. 13 Western Illinois and No. 6 Maryland to advance to the Sweet Sixteen, where they ended their season in a 42–63 loss to undefeated and top-seeded UConn.

== Offseason ==
=== Departures ===
North Carolina departures
Name	Number	Pos.	Height	Year	Hometown	Reason for departure
Lanie Grant	0	Guard	5'9"	Sophomore	Midlothian, VA	Transferred to TCU
Nyla Harris	2	Forward	6'2"	Senior	Orlando, FL	Graduated; went undrafted in the 2026 WNBA draft, signed a training camp contract with the Washington Mystics
Taliyah Henderson	3	Guard	6'1"	Freshman	Vail, AZ	Transferred to Clemson
Liza Astakhova	5	Forward	6'2"	Freshman	Moscow, Russia	Transferred to BYU
Elina Aarnisalo	17	Guard	5'10"	Sophomore	Helsinki, Finland	Transferred to UCLA
Indya Nivar	24	Guard	5'10"	Senior	Apex, NC	Graduated, selected 28th overall by the Atlanta Dream in the 2026 WNBA draft

=== Incoming transfers ===
North Carolina incoming transfers
Name	Number	Pos.	Height	Year	Hometown	Previous school
Gabby White	3	Guard	5'10"	Sophomore	Chapel Hill, NC	Virginia
Sophie Burrows	5	Guard	6'2"	Senior	Lower Plenty, Australia	Syracuse
Achol Akot	8	Forward	6'1"	Senior	Ottawa, Ontario	Oklahoma State
Chloe Clardy	13	Guard	5'9"	Senior	Conway, AR	Stanford

=== Recruiting class ===
College recruiting
Name	Hometown	School	Height	Weight	Commit date
Kate Harpring; PG	Atlanta, GA	Marist School	5 ft 10 in (1.78 m)	N/A	
Kate Harpring; PG	Recruit ratings: Rivals: 247Sports: ESPN: (98)				
Noelle Bofia; F	Phoenix, AZ	Xavier Prep	6 ft 4 in (1.93 m)	N/A	
Noelle Bofia; F	Recruit ratings: Rivals: 247Sports: ESPN: (94)				
Overall recruit ranking: ESPN: 10
Note: In many cases, Scout, Rivals, 247Sports, On3, and ESPN may conflict in their listings of height and weight.; In these cases, the average was taken. ESPN grades are on a 100-point scale.; Sources: "2026 Player Commits". ESPN. Archived from the original on August 11, 2026.

== Roster ==
Years are listed according to the new NCAA age-based eligibility model.

2026–27 North Carolina Tar Heels women's basketball team
Players
Coaches

Pos.	#	Name	Height	Year	Previous school	Hometown
G	1	Jordan Zubich	5 ft 11 in (1.8 m)	Jr	Mountain Iron-Buhl High School	Mountain Iron, MN
G	3	Gabby White	5 ft 10 in (1.78 m)	So	Seaforth High School; Virginia	Chapel Hill, NC
F	4	Laila Hull	6 ft 1 in (1.85 m)	Sr	Zionsville Community High School	Zionsville, IN
G	5	Sophie Burrows	6 ft 2 in (1.88 m)	Sr	Viewbank College; Syracuse	Lower Plenty, Australia
G	7	Nyla Brooks	6 ft 1 in (1.85 m)	So	Bishop Ireton High School	Waldorf, MD
F	8	Achol Akot	6 ft 1 in (1.85 m)	Sr	Capital Courts Academy; Oklahoma State	Ottawa, Ontario
G	10	Reniya Kelly (C)	5 ft 7 in (1.7 m)	Sr	Hoover High School	Hoover, AL
G	11	Kate Harpring	5 ft 10 in (1.78 m)	Fr	Marist School	Atlanta, GA
G	13	Chloe Clardy	5 ft 9 in (1.75 m)	Sr	Conway High School; Stanford	Conway, AR
G	15	Sydney Barker (C)	5 ft 7 in (1.7 m)	Sr	Charles E. Jordan High School	Durham, NC
F	21	Ciera Toomey	6 ft 4 in (1.93 m)	Sr	Dunmore High School	Dunmore, PA
G	26	Taissa Queiroz	6 ft 1 in (1.85 m)	So	Cardinal Newman High School	Belo Horizonte, Brazil
C	34	Blanca Thomas	6 ft 5 in (1.96 m)	Jr	Charlotte Catholic High School	Charlotte, NC
F	52	Noelle Bofia	6 ft 4 in (1.93 m)	Fr	Xavier Prep	Phoenix, AZ

Head coach

- Courtney Banghart (Dartmouth)

Assistant coach(es)

- Joanne Aluka-White (Middle Tennessee)
- Cory McNeill (Morgan State)
- Katherine Bixby (Ithaca)
- Daniel Metzelfeld (Trinity)
- Lexi Weger (Princeton)

Legend

- (C) Team captain
- (S) Suspended
- (I) Ineligible
- (W) Walk-on
- Injured
- Current redshirt

Roster
Last update: August 11, 2026

== Schedule and results ==
Date time, TV	Rank^{#}	Opponent^{#}	Result	Record	High points	High rebounds	High assists	Site (attendance) city, state
Exhibition
October 18, 2026*; 1:00 p.m.		Davidson	W 76–66		18 – Akot	11 – Akot	2 – Tied	Carmichael Arena (890); Chapel Hill, NC
October 24, 2026*; 1:00 p.m., B1G+	No. 12	at No. 20 Maryland	L 68–72		29 – Harpring	6 – Harpring	4 – Tied	Xfinity Center (5,007); College Park, MD
Regular season
November 2, 2026*; 2:30 p.m., ESPN2	No. 12	vs. No. 21 Oklahoma; Oui-Play	L 79–91	0–1	21 – Harpring	8 – Tied	7 – Kelly	Adidas Arena (5,000); Paris, France
November 8, 2026*; 5:30 p.m., ESPN	No. 12	vs. No. 1 South Carolina; Ally Tipoff	L 39–84	0–2	13 – Brooks	7 – Harpring	3 – Kelly	Spectrum Center (11,530); Charlotte, NC
November 11, 2026*; 7:00 p.m., ACCNX	No. 23	North Carolina Central	W 109–40	1–2	17 – Brooks	7 – Thomas	7 – Akot	Carmichael Arena (1,969); Chapel Hill, NC
November 14, 2026*; 4:00 p.m., ESPN+	No. 23	at Penn	W 71–60	2–2	30 – Harpring	8 – Akot	5 – Kelly	The Palestra (2,714); Philadelphia, PA
November 19, 2026*; 6:00 p.m., ESPN2	No. 24	vs. Texas Tech; WBCA Showcase	W 61–47	3–2	28 – Harpring	7 – Burrows	4 – Tied	State Farm Field House; Orlando, FL
November 21, 2026*; 5:00 p.m., ESPN+	No. 24	vs. Alabama; WBCA Showcase	W 78–64	4–2	20 – Harpring	5 – Tied	7 – Kelly	State Farm Field House; Orlando, FL
November 24, 2026*; 7:00 p.m., ACCNX		Gardner–Webb						Carmichael Arena; Chapel Hill, NC
November 27, 2026*; 7:00 p.m., ACCNX		Army						Carmichael Arena; Chapel Hill, NC
November 29, 2026*; 4:00 p.m., ACCN		Brown						Carmichael Arena; Chapel Hill, NC
December 2, 2026*; 7:15 p.m., ESPN2		LSU; ACC–SEC Challenge						Carmichael Arena; Chapel Hill, NC
December 6, 2026*; 2:00 p.m., ACCN		Elon						Carmichael Arena; Chapel Hill, NC
December 9, 2026*; 11:00 a.m., ACCNX		Winthrop						Carmichael Arena; Chapel Hill, NC
December 13, 2026; 6:00 p.m., ESPN		NC State; Rivalry						Carmichael Arena; Chapel Hill, NC
December 17, 2026; 6:00 p.m., ACCN		Georgia Tech						Carmichael Arena; Chapel Hill, NC
December 21, 2026*; 4:00 p.m., ACCN		Norfolk State						Carmichael Arena; Chapel Hill, NC
December 28, 2026*; 8:00 p.m., ACCN		UNC Wilmington						Carmichael Arena; Chapel Hill, NC
December 31, 2026; 6:00 p.m., ACCN		at Syracuse						JMA Wireless Dome; Syracuse, NY
January 3, 2027; 2:00 p.m., The CW		at Clemson						Littlejohn Coliseum; Clemson, SC
January 7, 2027; 8:00 p.m., ACCN		Wake Forest; Rivalry						Carmichael Arena; Chapel Hill, NC
January 10, 2027; 3:00 p.m., ESPN/ESPN2		at Louisville						KFC Yum! Center; Louisville, KY
January 17, 2027; 6:00 p.m., ACCN		Boston College						Carmichael Arena; Chapel Hill, NC
January 21, 2027; 8:00 p.m., ACCN		at California						Haas Pavilion; Berkeley, CA
January 24, 2027; 2:00 p.m., ESPN/ESPN2/ESPNU		at Stanford						Maples Pavilion; Stanford, CA
January 28, 2027; 6:00 p.m., ESPN		Notre Dame						Carmichael Arena; Chapel Hill, NC
January 31, 2027; 5:00 p.m., ESPN		Duke; Rivalry						Carmichael Arena; Chapel Hill, NC
February 4, 2027; 7:00 p.m., ACCNX		at Miami (FL)						Watsco Center; Coral Gables, FL
February 7, 2027; 2:00 p.m., ACCN		Virginia Tech						Carmichael Arena; Chapel Hill, NC
February 14, 2027; 2:00 p.m., ACCNX		at SMU						Moody Coliseum; University Park, TX
February 18, 2027; 6:00 p.m., ACCN		at Pittsburgh						Peterson Events Center; Pittsburgh, PA
February 21, 2027; 12:00 p.m., The CW		Florida State						Carmichael Arena; Chapel Hill, NC
February 25, 2027; 8:00 p.m., ACCN		Virginia						Carmichael Arena; Chapel Hill, NC
February 28, 2027; 4:00 p.m., ESPN		at Duke; Rivalry						Cameron Indoor Stadium; Durham, NC
*Non-conference game. ^{#}Rankings from AP Poll. (#) Tournament seedings in parentheses. All times are in Eastern.

== Rankings ==
Ranking movements Legend: ██ Increase in ranking ██ Decrease in ranking
	Week																				
Poll	Pre	1	2	3	4	5	6	7	8	9	10	11	12	13	14	15	16	17	18	19	Final
AP	12	23	24																		
Coaches	11	23	24																		
