= ACC–SEC Challenge =

NCAA men's college basketball series

- Conference: Atlantic Coast Conference; Southeastern Conference
- League: NCAA Division I
- Founded: 2023
- Sports fielded: College basketball
- Most titles: Men's: SEC (2); Women's: SEC (1)
- Broadcaster: ESPN

The ACC–SEC Challenge is an in-season NCAA Division I college basketball series that matches men's and women's teams from the Atlantic Coast Conference (ACC) and the Southeastern Conference (SEC). It replaced the ACC–Big Ten Challenge and the Big 12/SEC Challenge which both ended in 2022. ESPN again would play an important role with the creating of the challenge and holds the broadcast rights to all games. The ACC–SEC Challenge will occur every year early in the non-conference portion of the schedule for the teams, typically played in late November/early December. Each game will be hosted by one of the participating schools, with teams typically alternating home and away status in each successive year.

The initial year of the challenge was played in the 2023 College Basketball season ending with both Men's and Women's records tied.

== Format ==
Typically, match-ups are selected for their expected interest in the game. Higher profile teams are chosen to play each other to enhance television ratings for ESPN.

In 2023 the men's and women's teams competed in a series that featured 28 games and expanded to 32 when Texas and Oklahoma joined the SEC before the 2024 season. The ACC added California, SMU and Stanford at the same time, forcing two ACC schools to sit out every year.

== Yearly results ==
=== Men's ===
Year	Winner	ACC Wins	SEC Wins	Series	Total Attendance
2023	Tied	7	7	0–0–1	169,190
2024	SEC	2	14	0–1–1	165,229
2025	SEC	7	9	0–2–1	162,964
2026	TBD	0	0	0–0–0	TBA
Overall		16	30	0–2–1	497,383

=== Women's ===
Year	Winner	ACC Wins	SEC Wins	Series	Total Attendance
2023	Tied	7	7	0–0–1	54,279
2024	SEC	6	10	0–1–1	80,771
2025	SEC	3	13	0–2–1	61,297
2026	TBD	0	0	0–0–0	TBA
Overall		16	30	0–2–1	196,347

== Men's team records ==
=== Atlantic Coast Conference (0–2–1) ===
Institution	Wins	Loss	Win Pct.	Out	Home wins	Home losses	Away wins	Away losses	Neutral wins	Neutral losses	Current streak
Boston College Eagles	1	2	.333	0	0	1	1	1	0	0	L2
California Golden Bears	0	1	.000	0	0	0	0	1	0	0	L1
Clemson Tigers	2	1	.667	0	1	0	1	1	0	0	L1
Duke Blue Devils	2	1	.667	0	2	0	0	1	0	0	W2
Florida State Seminoles	0	3	.000	0	0	1	0	2	0	0	L3
Georgia Tech Yellow Jackets	1	0	1.000	0	1	0	0	0	0	0	W1
Louisville Cardinals	0	1	.000	1	0	0	0	1	0	0	L1
Miami Hurricanes	1	2	.333	0	0	1	1	1	0	0	W1
North Carolina Tar Heels	2	1	.667	0	1	1	1	0	0	0	W1
NC State Wolfpack	0	1	.000	0	0	0	0	1	0	0	L1
Notre Dame Fighting Irish	1	2	.333	0	1	0	0	2	0	0	W1
Pittsburgh Panthers	0	3	.000	0	0	2	0	1	0	0	L3
SMU Mustangs	0	1	.000	1	0	0	1	0	0	0	L1
Stanford Cardinal	0	0	–	1	0	0	0	0	0	0	
Syracuse Orange	2	1	.667	0	2	0	0	1	0	0	L1
Virginia Cavaliers	2	1	.667	0	1	0	1	1	0	0	W1
Virginia Tech Hokies	1	1	.500	0	0	0	0	1	0	0	W1
Wake Forest Demon Deacons	1	2	.333	0	1	1	0	1	0	0	L2

- The column "Out" indicates the number of Challenges from which the team was excluded. This does not include cancellations.

=== Southeastern Conference (2–0–1) ===
Institution	Wins	Loss	Win Pct.	Out	Home wins	Home losses	Away wins	Away losses	Neutral wins	Neutral losses	Current streak
Alabama Crimson Tide	2	1	.667	0	1	1	1	0	0	0	W2
Arkansas Razorbacks	3	0	1.000	0	1	0	2	0	0	0	W3
Auburn Tigers	2	1	.667	0	2	0	0	1	0	0	W1
Florida Gators	1	2	.333	0	1	0	0	2	0	0	L1
Georgia Bulldogs	3	0	1.000	0	1	0	2	0	0	0	W3
Kentucky Wildcats	1	2	.333	0	1	1	0	1	0	0	L2
LSU Tigers	2	1	.667	0	1	0	1	1	0	0	W2
Mississippi State Bulldogs	2	1	.667	0	1	0	1	1	0	0	W2
Missouri Tigers	2	1	.667	0	1	0	1	1	0	0	L1
Oklahoma Sooners	3	0	1.000	0	1	0	2	0	0	0	W3
Ole Miss Rebels	1	2	.333	0	1	2	0	0	0	0	L2
South Carolina Gamecocks	2	1	.667	0	1	1	1	0	0	0	L1
Tennessee Volunteers	1	2	.333	0	1	0	0	2	0	0	L1
Texas Longhorns	1	1	.500	0	0	1	1	0	0	0	L1
Texas A&M Aggies	2	1	.667	0	1	0	1	1	0	0	W2
Vanderbilt Commodores	2	1	.667	0	1	1	1	0	0	0	W2

- The column "Out" indicates the number of Challenges from which the team was excluded. This does not include cancellations.

== Women's team records ==
=== Atlantic Coast Conference (0–2–1) ===
Institution	Wins	Loss	Win Pct.	Out	Home wins	Home losses	Away wins	Away losses	Current streak
Boston College Eagles	0	2	.000	1	0	0	0	2	L2
California Golden Bears	1	1	.500	0	1	0	0	1	L1
Clemson Tigers	0	3	.000	0	0	1	0	2	L3
Duke Blue Devils	1	2	.333	0	0	1	1	1	L2
Florida State Seminoles	0	3	.000	0	0	2	0	1	L3
Georgia Tech Yellow Jackets	1	2	.333	0	1	1	1	0	L1
Louisville Cardinals	1	2	.333	0	0	2	1	0	L2
Miami Hurricanes	1	2	.333	0	0	2	1	0	L2
North Carolina Tar Heels	1	2	.333	0	1	1	0	1	L1
NC State Wolfpack	2	1	.667	0	2	0	0	1	L1
Notre Dame Fighting Irish	2	1	.667	0	1	0	1	1	L1
Pittsburgh Panthers	0	1	.000	2	0	0	0	1	L1
SMU Mustangs	1	1	.500	0	1	0	0	1	W1
Stanford Cardinal	0	2	.000	0	0	1	0	1	L2
Syracuse Orange	2	1	.667	0	1	0	1	1	W1
Virginia Cavaliers	1	2	.333	0	1	1	0	1	L2
Virginia Tech Hokies	2	1	.667	0	1	0	1	1	W2
Wake Forest Demon Deacons	0	1	.000	2	0	1	0	0	L1

- The column "Out" indicates the number of Challenges from which the team was excluded. This does not include cancellations.

=== Southeastern Conference (2–0–1) ===
Institution	Wins	Loss	Win Pct.	Out	Home wins	Home losses	Away wins	Away losses	Current streak
Alabama Crimson Tide	1	2	.333	0	1	0	0	2	W1
Arkansas Razorbacks	2	1	.667	0	1	0	1	1	L1
Auburn Tigers	2	1	.667	0	1	1	1	0	L1
Florida Gators	2	1	.667	0	1	0	1	1	L1
Georgia Lady Bulldogs	1	2	.333	0	0	2	1	0	W1
Kentucky Wildcats	2	1	.667	0	1	0	1	1	W1
LSU Tigers	3	0	1.000	0	2	0	1	0	W3
Mississippi State Bulldogs	1	2	.333	0	1	1	0	1	W1
Missouri Tigers	2	1	.667	0	2	0	0	1	W2
Oklahoma Sooners	2	0	1.000	0	1	0	1	0	W2
Ole Miss Rebels	1	2	.333	0	1	1	0	2	W1
South Carolina Gamecocks	3	0	1.000	0	1	0	2	0	W3
Tennessee Lady Volunteers	2	1	.667	0	1	1	1	0	W2
Texas Longhorns	1	1	.500	0	1	0	0	1	W1
Texas A&M Aggies	3	0	1.000	0	2	0	1	0	W3
Vanderbilt Commodores	2	1	.667	0	1	0	1	1	W2

- The column "Out" indicates the number of Challenges from which the team was excluded. This does not include cancellations.

== Men's results ==
=== 2026 TBD 0–0 ===
Date	Time	ACC team	SEC team	Score	Location	Television	Attendance	Challenge leader
December 1	5:00 p.m.	Boston College	Georgia	–	Stegeman Coliseum • Athens, Georgia	ESPN2		
December 1	7:00 p.m.	Florida State	Tennessee	–	Thompson–Boling Arena • Knoxville, Tennessee	ESPN2		
December 1	7:00 p.m.	Clemson	Auburn	–	Littlejohn Coliseum • Clemson, South Carolina	ESPNU		
December 1	7:00 p.m.	NC State	South Carolina	–	Lenovo Center • Raleigh, North Carolina	ACCN		
December 1	7:00 p.m.	Pittsburgh	Missouri	–	Mizzou Arena • Columbia, Missouri	SECN		
December 1	7:30 p.m.	North Carolina	Arkansas	–	Dean Smith Center • Chapel Hill, North Carolina	ESPN		
December 1	9:00 p.m.	Louisville	Texas	–	Moody Center • Austin, Texas	ESPN2		
December 1	9:00 p.m.	Syracuse	Oklahoma	–	Lloyd Noble Center • Norman, Oklahoma	ESPNU		
December 1	9:00 p.m.	Virginia Tech	Ole Miss	–	Cassell Coliseum • Blacksburg, Virginia	ACCN		
December 1	9:00 p.m.	Wake Forest	LSU	–	Pete Maravich Assembly Center • Baton Rouge, Louisiana	SECN		
December 1	9:30 p.m.	Duke	Florida	–	O'Connell Center • Gainesville, Florida	ESPN		
December 2	7:15 p.m.	Virginia	Kentucky	–	John Paul Jones Arena • Charlottesville, Virginia	ESPN		
December 2	7:15 p.m.	Notre Dame	Vanderbilt	–	Joyce Center • South Bend, Indiana	ACCN		
December 2	9:15 p.m.	Miami (FL)	Alabama	–	Watsco Center • Coral Gables, Florida	ESPN		
December 2	9:15 p.m.	Stanford	Texas A&M	–	Reed Arena • College Station, Texas	ESPNU		
December 2	9:15 p.m.	Georgia Tech	Mississippi State	–	Humphrey Coliseum • Starkville, Mississippi	SECN		
**Winners are in bold** California & SMU did not compete for the ACC. Game times in EST

=== 2025 SEC 9–7 ===
Date	Time	ACC team	SEC team	Score	Location	Television	Attendance	Challenge leader
December 2	7:00 p.m.	Pittsburgh	**Texas A&M**	73–81	Petersen Events Center • Pittsburgh, Pennsylvania	ESPNU	4,945	SEC 1–0
December 2	7:00 p.m.	**Virginia Tech**	South Carolina	86–83^{OT}	Colonial Life Arena • Columbia, South Carolina	SECN	11,420	Tied 1–1
December 2	7:00 p.m.	**Syracuse**	No. 13 Tennessee	62–60	JMA Wireless Dome • Syracuse, New York	ESPN2	19,657	ACC 2–1
December 2	7:00 p.m.	Wake Forest	**Oklahoma**	68–86	LJVM Coliseum • Winston-Salem, North Carolina	ACCN	7,216	Tied 2–2
December 2	7:30 p.m.	**No. 4 Duke**	No. 15 Florida	67–66	Cameron Indoor Stadium • Durham, North Carolina	ESPN	9,314	ACC 3–2
December 2	9:00 p.m.	**Miami (FL)**	Ole Miss	75–66	SJB Pavilion • University, Mississippi	SECN	9,373	ACC 4–2
December 2	9:00 p.m.	Florida State	**Georgia**	107–73	Donald L. Tucker Civic Center • Tallahassee, Florida	ACCN	6,677	ACC 4–3
December 2	9:00 p.m.	**Notre Dame**	Missouri	76–71	Joyce Center • South Bend, Indiana	ESPNU	4,980	ACC 5–3
December 2	9:30 p.m.	**No. 16 North Carolina**	No. 18 Kentucky	67–64	Rupp Arena • Lexington, Kentucky	ESPN	20,029	ACC 6–3
December 3	7:00 p.m.	Boston College	**LSU**	69–78^{OT}	Conte Forum • Chestnut Hill, Massachusetts	ACCN	4,060	ACC 6–4
December 3	7:00 p.m.	No. 6 Louisville	**No. 25 Arkansas**	80–89	Bud Walton Arena • Fayetteville, Arkansas	ESPN	19,600	ACC 6–5
December 3	7:00 p.m.	Clemson	**No. 12 Alabama**	84–90	Coleman Coliseum • Tuscaloosa, Alabama	ESPNU	13,474	Tied 6–6
December 3	9:00 p.m.	SMU	**No. 17 Vanderbilt**	69–88	Memorial Gymnasium • Nashville, Tennessee	SECN	7,437	SEC 7–6
December 3	9:00 p.m.	NC State	**No. 20 Auburn**	73–83	Neville Arena • Auburn, Alabama	ESPN	9,121	SEC 8–6
December 3	9:00 p.m.	Georgia Tech	**Mississippi State**	73–85	McCamish Pavilion • Atlanta, Georgia	ACCN	4,859	SEC 9–6
December 3	9:00 p.m.	**Virginia**	Texas	88–69	Moody Center • Austin, Texas	ESPNU	10,802	SEC 9–7
**Winners are in bold** California & Stanford did not compete for the ACC. Game times in EST

=== 2024 SEC 14–2 ===
Date	Time	ACC team	SEC team	Score	Location	Television	Attendance	Challenge leader
December 3	7:00 p.m.	Notre Dame	**Georgia**	48–69	Stegeman Coliseum • Athens, Georgia	ESPNU	8,045	SEC 1–0
December 3	7:00 p.m.	Boston College	**South Carolina**	51–73	Conte Forum • Chestnut Hill, Massachusetts	ACCN	4,607	SEC 2–0
December 3	7:00 p.m.	Miami (FL)	**Arkansas**	73–76	Watsco Center • Coral Gables, Florida	ESPN2	6,389	SEC 3–0
December 3	7:00 p.m.	California	**Missouri**	93–98	Mizzou Arena • Columbia, Missouri	SECN	9,791	SEC 4–0
December 3	7:30 p.m.	Syracuse	No. 3 **Tennessee**	70–96	Thompson–Boling Arena • Knoxville, Tennessee	ESPN	21,678	SEC 5–0
December 3	9:00 p.m.	Wake Forest	No. 22 **Texas A&M**	44–57	Reed Arena • College Station, Texas	ESPN2	8,833	SEC 6–0
December 3	9:00 p.m.	Florida State	**LSU**	75–85	Pete Maravich Assembly Center • Baton Rouge, Louisiana	SECN	8,323	SEC 7–0
December 3	9:00 p.m.	Georgia Tech	No. 21 **Oklahoma**	61–76	Lloyd Noble Center • Norman, Oklahoma	ESPNU	7,725	SEC 8–0
December 3	9:00 p.m.	Louisville	No. 23 **Ole Miss**	63–86	KFC Yum! Center • Louisville, Kentucky	ACCN	12,729	SEC 9–0
December 3	9:30 p.m.	**Clemson**	No. 4 Kentucky	70–66	Littlejohn Coliseum • Clemson, South Carolina	ESPN	9,000	SEC 9–1
December 4	7:15 p.m.	No. 20 North Carolina	No. 10 **Alabama**	79–92	Dean Smith Center • Chapel Hill, North Carolina	ESPN	21,750	SEC 10–1
December 4	7:15 p.m.	Virginia	No. 13 **Florida**	69–87	O'Connell Center • Gainesville, Florida	ESPN2	9,184	SEC 11–1
December 4	9:15 p.m.	No. 9 **Duke**	No. 2 Auburn	84–78	Cameron Indoor Stadium • Durham, North Carolina	ESPN	9,314	SEC 11–2
December 4	9:15 p.m.	NC State	**Texas**	59–63	Lenovo Center • Raleigh, North Carolina	ESPN2	13,396	SEC 12–2
December 4	9:15 p.m.	No. 18 Pittsburgh	**Mississippi State**	57–90	Humphrey Coliseum • Starkville, Mississippi	SECN	9,492	SEC 13–2
December 4	9:15 p.m.	Virginia Tech	**Vanderbilt**	64–80	Cassell Coliseum • Blacksburg, Virginia	ACCN	4,973	SEC 14–2
**Winners are in bold** SMU and Stanford did not compete for the ACC. Game times in EST

=== 2023 Tied 7–7 ===
Date	Time	ACC team	SEC team	Score	Location	Television	Attendance	Challenge leader
Nov 28	7:00 p.m.	**Syracuse**	LSU	80–57	JMA Wireless Dome • Syracuse, New York	ESPN2	19,602	ACC 1–0
Nov 28	7:00 p.m.	Notre Dame	**South Carolina**	53–65	Colonial Life Arena • Columbia, South Carolina	SECN	15,215	Tied 1–1
Nov 28	7:00 p.m.	**Georgia Tech**	No. 21 Mississippi State	67–59	McCamish Pavilion • Atlanta, Georgia	ACCN	3,913	ACC 2–1
Nov 28	7:00 p.m.	Pittsburgh	**Missouri**	64–71	Petersen Events Center • Pittsburgh, Pennsylvania	ESPNU	7,390	Tied 2–2
Nov 28	7:30 p.m.	No. 8 Miami (FL)	**No. 12 Kentucky**	73–95	Rupp Arena • Lexington, Kentucky	ESPN	20,119	SEC 3–2
Nov 28	9:00 p.m.	NC State	**Ole Miss**	52–72	SJB Pavilion • University, Mississippi	ESPN2	7,565	SEC 4–2
Nov 28	9:30 p.m.	**Clemson**	No. 23 Alabama	85–77	Coleman Coliseum • Tuscaloosa, Alabama	ESPN	10,725	SEC 4–3
Nov 29	7:15 p.m.	**Wake Forest**	Florida	82–71	LJVM Coliseum • Winston-Salem, North Carolina	ESPNU	8,165	Tied 4–4
Nov 29	7:15 p.m.	**Virginia**	No. 14 Texas A&M	59–47	John Paul Jones Arena • Charlottesville, Virginia	ESPN2	14,061	ACC 5–4
Nov 29	7:15 p.m.	**No. 17 North Carolina**	No. 10 Tennessee	100–92	Dean Smith Center • Chapel Hill, North Carolina	ESPN	20,756	ACC 6–4
Nov 29	9:15 p.m.	**Boston College**	Vanderbilt	78–62	Memorial Gymnasium • Nashville, Tennessee	SECN	5,516	ACC 7–4
Nov 29	9:15 p.m.	Virginia Tech	**Auburn**	57–74	Neville Arena • Auburn, Alabama	ESPN2	9,121	ACC 7–5
Nov 29	9:15 p.m.	Florida State	**Georgia**	66–68	Donald L. Tucker Civic Center • Tallahassee, Florida	ACCN	6,688	ACC 7–6
Nov 29	9:15 p.m.	No. 7 Duke	**Arkansas**	75–80	Bud Walton Arena • Fayetteville, Arkansas	ESPN	20,344	Tied 7–7
**Winners are in bold** Louisville did not participate for the ACC. Game times in EST

== Women's results ==
=== 2026 TBD 0–0 ===
Date	Time	ACC team	SEC team	Score	Location	Television	Attendance	Challenge leader
December 2	5:00 p.m.	Miami (FL)	Florida	–	O'Connell Center • Gainesville, Florida	ESPNU		
December 2	7:15 p.m.	North Carolina	LSU	–	Carmichael Arena • Chapel Hill, North Carolina	ESPN2		
December 2	7:15 p.m.	NC State	Ole Miss	–	SJB Pavilion • Oxford, Mississippi	ESPNU		
December 2	7:15 p.m.	Stanford	Auburn	–	Neville Arena • Auburn, Alabama	SECN		
December 2	9:15 p.m.	Louisville	Texas	–	Moody Center • Austin, Texas	ESPN2		
December 2	9:15 p.m.	SMU	Georgia	–	Moody Coliseum • University Park, Texas	ACCN		
December 3	7:00 p.m.	Duke	South Carolina	–	Cameron Indoor Stadium • Durham, North Carolina	ESPN		
December 3	7:00 p.m.	Clemson	Kentucky	–	Rupp Arena • Lexington, Kentucky	ESPN2		
December 3	7:00 p.m.	Syracuse	Oklahoma	–	JMA Wireless Dome • Syracuse, New York	ESPNU		
December 3	7:00 p.m.	Florida State	Missouri	–	Donald L. Tucker Civic Center • Tallahassee, Florida	ACCN		
December 3	7:00 p.m.	Georgia tech	Alabama	–	Coleman Coliseum • Tuscaloosa, Alabama	SECN		
December 3	9:00 p.m.	Notre Dame	Vanderbilt	–	Memorial Gymnasium • Nashville, Tennessee	ESPN		
December 3	9:00 p.m.	Virginia Tech	Tennessee	–	Cassell Coliseum • Blacksburg, Virginia	ESPN2		
December 3	9:00 p.m.	Wake Forest	Arkansas	–	Bud Walton Arena • Fayetteville, Arkansas	SECN		
December 3	9:00 p.m.	California	Texas A&M	–	Haas Pavilion • Berkeley, California	ACCN		
December 3	9:00 p.m.	Virginia	Mississippi State	–	Humphrey Coliseum • Starkville, Mississippi	ESPNU		
**Winners are in bold** Boston College & Pitt did not compete for the ACC. Game times in EST

=== 2025 SEC 13–3 ===
Date	Time	ACC team	SEC team	Score	Location	Television	Attendance	Challenge leader
December 3	5:00 p.m.	Florida State	**Georgia**	60–80	Donald L. Tucker Civic Center • Tallahassee, Florida	ESPNU	1,155	SEC 1–0
December 3	5:00 p.m.	Miami (FL)	**No. 17 Kentucky**	48–64	Watsco Center • Coral Gables, Florida	ESPN2	859	SEC 2–0
December 3	5:00 p.m.	**Syracuse**	Auburn	68–60^{OT}	Neville Arena • Auburn, Alabama	ACCN	2,166	SEC 2–1
December 3	5:00 p.m.	Virginia	**No. 15 Vanderbilt**	68–81	Memorial Gymnasium • Nashville, Tennessee	SECN	2,661	SEC 3–1
December 3	7:00 p.m.	NC State	**No. 9 Oklahoma**	98–103^{OT}	Lloyd Noble Center • Norman, Oklahoma	ESPN2	4,614	SEC 4–1
December 3	7:00 p.m.	Georgia Tech	**Texas A&M**	63–72	Reed Arena • College Station, Texas	SECN	3,626	SEC 5–1
December 3	9:00 p.m.	Stanford	**No. 19 Tennessee**	62–65	Maples Pavilion • Stanford, California	ESPN2	4,499	SEC 6–1
December 4	5:00 p.m.	**Virginia Tech**	Florida	68–64	Cassell Coliseum • Blacksburg, Virginia	ESPN2	4,118	SEC 6–2
December 4	7:00 p.m.	Clemson	**Alabama**	48–72	Coleman Coliseum • Tuscaloosa, Alabama	ESPNU	2,525	SEC 7–2
December 4	7:00 p.m.	No. 22 Louisville	**No. 3 South Carolina**	77–79	KFC Yum! Center • Louisville, Kentucky	ESPN	10,012	SEC 8–2
December 4	7:00 p.m.	No. 11 North Carolina	**No. 2 Texas**	64–79	Moody Center • Austin, Texas	ESPN2	9,020	SEC 9–2
December 4	7:00 p.m.	Pittsburgh	**Mississippi State**	44–79	Humphrey Coliseum • Mississippi State, Mississippi	SECN	3,433	SEC 10–2
December 4	7:00 p.m.	**SMU**	Arkansas	78−63	Moody Coliseum • University Park, Texas	ACCN	1,378	SEC 10–3
December 4	9:00 p.m.	California	**Missouri**	67–68	Mizzou Arena • Columbia, Missouri	SECN	2,892	SEC 11–3
December 4	9:00 p.m.	Duke	**No. 5 LSU**	77–93	Cameron Indoor Stadium • Durham, North Carolina	ESPN	4,871	SEC 12–3
December 4	9:00 p.m.	No. 18 Notre Dame	**No. 13 Ole Miss**	62–69	SJB Pavilion • Oxford, Mississippi	ESPN2	3,468	SEC 13–3
**Winners are in bold** Boston College & Wake Forest did not compete for the ACC. Game times in EST

=== 2024 SEC 10–6 ===
Date	Time	ACC team	SEC team	Score	Location	Television	Attendance	Challenge leader
December 4	5:00 p.m.	**Virginia Tech**	Georgia	70–61	Stegeman Coliseum • Athens, Georgia	SECN	2,162	ACC 1–0
December 4	5:00 p.m.	Miami (FL)	**Vanderbilt**	70–88	Watsco Center • Coral Gables, Florida	ACCN	2,107	Tied 1–1
December 4	5:00 p.m.	No. 22 Louisville	**No. 11 Oklahoma**	72–78	KFC Yum! Center • Louisville, Kentucky	ESPN2	7,446	SEC 2–1
December 4	7:15 p.m.	Syracuse	**Texas A&M**	45–57	Reed Arena • College Station, Texas	ESPNU	3,043	SEC 3–1
December 4	7:15 p.m.	Florida State	**Tennessee**	77–79	Thompson–Boling Arena • Knoxville, Tennessee	SECN	9,529	SEC 4–1
December 4	7:15 p.m.	**Georgia Tech**	Mississippi State	78–75	McCamish Pavilion • Atlanta, Georgia	ACCN	1,514	SEC 4–2
December 5	5:00 p.m.	**No. 16 North Carolina**	No. 14 Kentucky	72–53	Carmichael Arena • Chapel Hill, North Carolina	ESPN2	2,816	SEC 4–3
December 5	6:00 p.m.	Virginia	**Auburn**	57–66	John Paul Jones Arena • Charlottesville, Virginia	ACCN	3,994	SEC 5–3
December 5	7:00 p.m.	**No. 10 Notre Dame**	No. 4 Texas	80–70^{OT}	Joyce Center • South Bend, Indiana	ESPN	9,149	SEC 5–4
December 5	7:00 p.m.	**NC State**	No. 18 Ole Miss	68–61	Reynolds Coliseum • Raleigh, North Carolina	ESPN2	5,500	Tied 5–5
December 5	7:00 p.m.	Boston College	**Arkansas**	64–75	Bud Walton Arena • Fayetteville, Arkansas	SECN	2,252	SEC 6–5
December 5	8:00 p.m.	Clemson	**Florida**	64–77	Littlejohn Coliseum • Clemson, South Carolina	ACCN	1,475	SEC 7–5
December 5	9:00 p.m.	**California**	No. 19 Alabama	69–65	Haas Pavilion • Berkeley, California	ESPNU	1,432	SEC 7–6
December 5	9:00 p.m.	No. 8 Duke	**No. 3 South Carolina**	70–81	Colonial Life Arena • Columbia, South Carolina	ESPN	15,677	SEC 8–6
December 5	9:00 p.m.	SMU	**Missouri**	68–61	Mizzou Arena • Columbia, Missouri	SECN	2,358	SEC 9–6
December 5	9:00 p.m.	Stanford	**No. 5 LSU**	88–94^{OT}	Pete Maravich Assembly Center • Baton Rouge, Louisiana	ESPN2	10,317	SEC 10–6
**Winners are in bold** Pittsburgh and Wake Forest did not compete in the 2024 edition for the ACC. Game times in EST

=== 2023 Tied 7–7 ===
Date	Time	ACC team	SEC team	Score	Location	Television	Attendance	Challenge leader
Nov 29	5:00 p.m.	Georgia Tech	**Florida**	58–68	McCamish Pavilion • Atlanta, Georgia	ACCN	1,387	SEC 1–0
Nov 29	5:00 p.m.	No. 18 **Notre Dame**	No. 20 Tennessee	74–69	Thompson–Boling Arena • Knoxville, Tennessee	ESPN2	8,211	Tied 1–1
Nov 29	7:15 p.m.	**Miami (FL)**	No. 21 Mississippi State	74–68	Humphrey Coliseum • Mississippi State, Mississippi	SECN	5,135	ACC 2–1
Nov 29	7:15 p.m.	No. 5 **NC State**	Vanderbilt	70–62	Reynolds Coliseum • Raleigh, North Carolina	ACCN	5,500	ACC 3–1
Nov 29	9:15 p.m.	No. 22 **Louisville**	No. 19 Ole Miss	64–58	SJB Pavilion • University, Mississippi	ESPNU	2,694	ACC 4–1
Nov 30	5:00 p.m.	**Duke**	Georgia	72–65	Stegeman Coliseum • Athens, Georgia	SECN	2,446	ACC 5–1
Nov 30	5:00 p.m.	**Virginia**	Missouri	87–81	John Paul Jones Arena • Charlottesville, Virginia	ACCN	3,701	ACC 6–1
Nov 30	7:00 p.m.	No. 15 Florida State	**Arkansas**	58–71	Donald L. Tucker Civic Center • Tallahassee, Florida	ESPN2	2,216	ACC 6–2
Nov 30	7:00 p.m.	Boston College	**Kentucky**	81–83	Clive M. Beck Center • Lexington, Kentucky	SECN	910	ACC 6–3
Nov 30	7:00 p.m.	**Syracuse**	Alabama	79–73	JMA Wireless Dome • Syracuse, New York	ACCN	1,819	ACC 7–3
Nov 30	7:00 p.m.	No. 24 North Carolina	No. 1 **South Carolina**	58–65	Carmichael Arena • Chapel Hill, North Carolina	ESPN	6,319	ACC 7–4
Nov 30	9:00 p.m.	No. 9 Virginia Tech	No. 7 **LSU**	64–82	Pete Maravich Assembly Center • Baton Rouge, Louisiana	ESPN	10,790	ACC 7–5
Nov 30	9:00 p.m.	Wake Forest	**Texas A&M**	57–81	LJVM Coliseum • Winston-Salem, North Carolina	ACCN	763	ACC 7–6
Nov 30	9:00 p.m.	Clemson	**Auburn**	53–83	Neville Arena • Auburn, Alabama	SECN	2,388	Tied 7–7
**Winners are in bold** Pittsburgh did not participate for the ACC. Game times in EST
