= 2026–27 Georgia Tech Yellow Jackets women's basketball team =

Intercollegiate basketball season

2026–27 Georgia Tech Yellow Jackets women's basketball
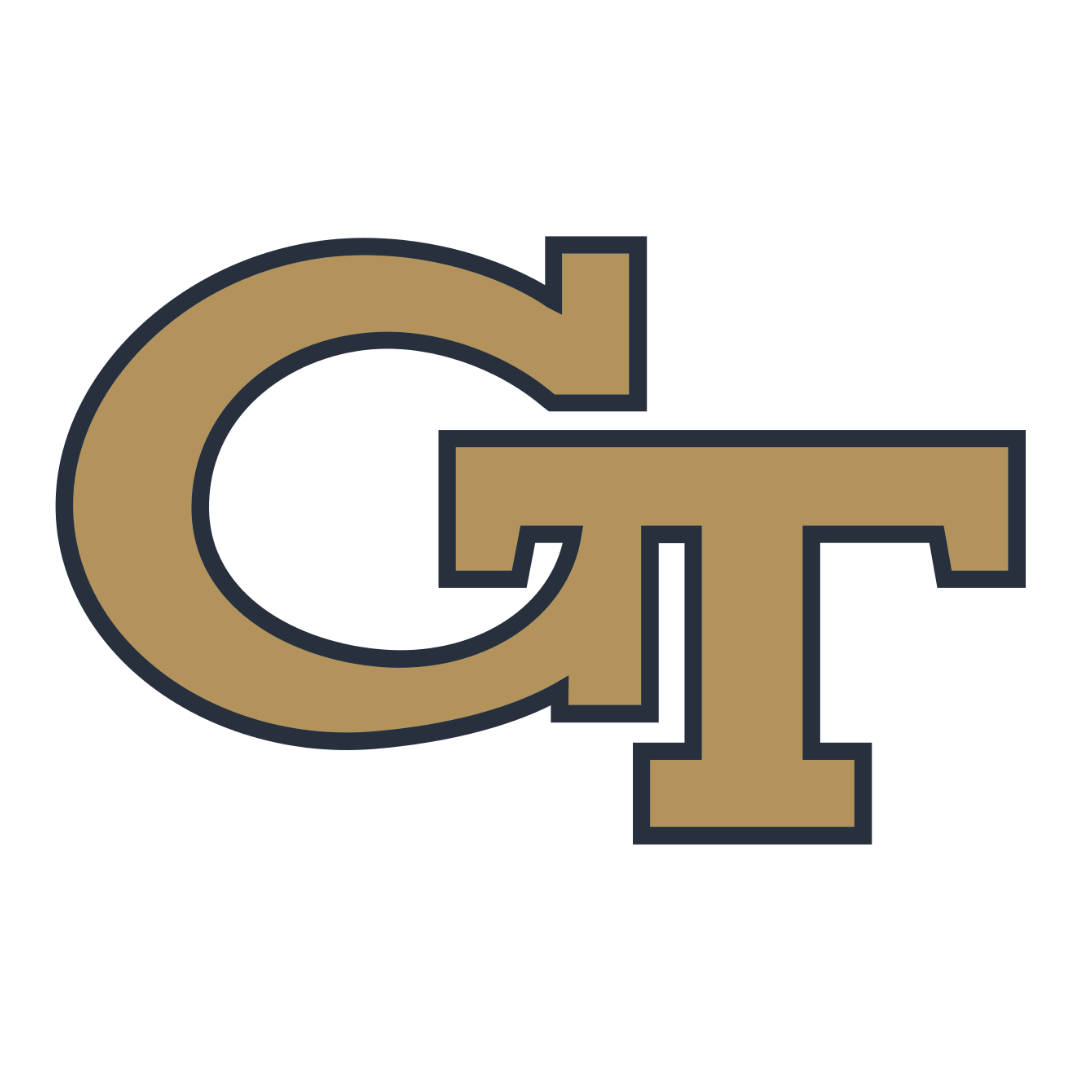
- Conference: Atlantic Coast Conference
- Record: 4–1 (0–0 ACC)
- Head coach: Karen Blair (2nd season)
- Associate head coach: Marsha Frese
- Assistant coaches: Chris Meadows Sr.; Ben Kantor; Morgan Williams; Caleb Currier
- Home arena: McCamish Pavilion

2026–27 ACC women's basketball standings
	Conf.				Overall
Team	W		L	PCT	W		L	PCT
No. 3 Louisville	0	–	0	–	6	–	0	1.000
California	0	–	0	–	5	–	0	1.000
Florida State	0	–	0	–	5	–	0	1.000
SMU	0	–	0	–	5	–	0	1.000
Virginia	0	–	0	–	5	–	0	1.000
Virginia Tech	0	–	0	–	5	–	0	1.000
No. 5 Duke	0	–	0	–	4	–	0	1.000
Miami (FL)	0	–	0	–	4	–	0	1.000
No. 13 Notre Dame	0	–	0	–	4	–	0	1.000
Pittsburgh	0	–	0	–	4	–	0	1.000
Syracuse	0	–	0	–	4	–	0	1.000
Clemson	0	–	0	–	4	–	1	.800
Georgia Tech	0	–	0	–	4	–	1	.800
NC State	0	–	0	–	4	–	1	.800
Stanford	0	–	0	–	4	–	1	.800
Wake Forest	0	–	0	–	4	–	1	.800
Boston College	0	–	0	–	2	–	2	.500
No. 24 North Carolina	0	–	0	–	2	–	2	.500
† 2027 ACC tournament winner As of November 17, 2026; Rankings from AP Poll

The 2026–27 Georgia Tech Yellow Jackets women's basketball team currently represents the Georgia Institute of Technology during the 2026–27 NCAA Division I women's basketball season. The Yellow Jackets, led by second-year head coach Karen Blair, play their home games at McCamish Pavilion in Atlanta, Georgia, and compete as a member of the Atlantic Coast Conference.

== Previous season ==
The Yellow Jackets finished the 2025–26 season 14–19 overall and 8–10 in ACC play, finishing in a tie for eleventh in the conference with Miami and Stanford. As the No. 11 seed in the ACC tournament, they defeated No. 14 Florida State 72–60 in the first round before losing 54–62 in the second round to No. 6 Virginia Tech.

Following their tournament elimination, the Yellow Jackets earned an at-large bid to the WBIT for the second time since its creation in 2024, where they were unseeded in the North Dakota State Bracket. They lost in the first round 65–69 to No. 2 seeded Kansas State to end their season.

== Offseason ==
=== Departures ===
Georgia Tech departures
Name	Number	Pos.	Height	Year	Hometown	Reason for departure
Brianna Turnage	0	Guard	6'1"	Senior	Atlanta, GA	Graduated; signed with the UpShot League's Jacksonville Waves
McKayla Taylor	1	Center	6'1"	Freshman	Atlanta, GA	Transferred to Alabama State (Note: Did not play in the 2025–26 season.)
Catherine Alben	5	Guard	5'7"	Senior	Snellville, GA	Graduated
Jada Crawshaw	12	Forward	6'0"	Junior	Darwin, Australia	Transferred to Seton Hall
D'Asia Thomas-Harris	33	Guard/forward	6'2"	Junior	Katy, TX	Transferred to Arkansas
Savannah Samuel	33	Guard	6'1"	5th year	Woodstock, GA	Exhausted eligibility

=== Incoming transfers ===
Georgia Tech incoming transfers
Name	Number	Pos.	Height	Year	Hometown	Previous school
Kyndal Walker	0	Guard	5'9"	Junior	Beltsville, MD	Maryland
Sofia Muñoz	5	Guard	5'8"	Sophomore	Canóvanas, PR	UAB
Penda Dieng	11	Forward	6'3"	Sophomore	Louga, Senegal	Xavier
Jordan Ode	12	Guard	6'0"	Sophomore	Maple Grove, MN	Michigan State
Anna Conza	24	Guard	5'8"	Junior	Long Island, NY	Oglethorpe (D-III)
Antonia Bates	35	Guard/forward	6'3"	5th year	Easton, PA	Rutgers

=== Recruiting class ===
There was no 2026 recruiting class.

== Roster ==
Years are listed according to the new NCAA age-based eligibility model.

2026–27 Georgia Tech Yellow Jackets women's basketball team
Players
Coaches

Pos.	#	Name	Height	Year	Previous school	Hometown
G	0	Kyndal Walker	5 ft 9 in (1.75 m)	Jr	St. John's College High School; Maryland	Beltsville, MD
G	3	Erica Moon	5 ft 6 in (1.68 m)	Sr	St. Francis School; Texas A&M	Atlanta, GA
G	4	Leyre Urdiain	5 ft 11 in (1.8 m)	So	Colegio Sansueña	Zaragoza, Spain
G	5	Sofia Muñoz	5 ft 8 in (1.73 m)	So	Lake Highland Prep; UAB	Canóvanas, PR
G	10	Autumn Washington	6 ft 0 in (1.83 m)	Fr	Ardrey Kell High School	Charlotte, NC
F	11	Penda Dieng	6 ft 3 in (1.91 m)	So	S3 Academy; Xavier	Louga, Senegal
G	12	Jordan Ode	6 ft 0 in (1.83 m)	So	Maple Grove High School; Michigan	Maple Grove, MN
C	13	Déborah Mukeba	6 ft 5 in (1.96 m)	Jr	Winston-Salem Christian; Boston College	Fleurus, Belgium
C	20	Ariadna Termis	6 ft 6 in (1.98 m)	Sr	IES Joaquín Blume	Zaragoza, Spain
G	21	Talayah Walker	5 ft 10 in (1.78 m)	Jr	Our Lady of Good Counsel High School; Penn State	Odenton, MD
G	22	Inés Noguero Outeiral (5th)	5 ft 9 in (1.75 m)	GS	IES Joaquín Blume	Gijón, Spain
G	23	La'Nya Foster	5 ft 9 in (1.75 m)	Sr	Lovejoy High School; Austin Peay	Riverdale, GA
G	24	Anna Conza	5 ft 8 in (1.73 m)	Jr	Valor Christian Academy; Oglethorpe	Long Island, NY
G/F	35	Antonia Bates (5th)	6 ft 3 in (1.91 m)	GS	Rutgers Prep; Rutgers	Easton, PA

Head coach

- Karen Blair (SMU)

Assistant coach(es)

- Marsha Frese (Rice)
- Chris Meadows (St. Bonaventure)
- Ben Kantor (Illinois)
- Morgan Williams (Georgetown)
- Caleb Currier (Tennessee)

Legend

- (C) Team captain
- (S) Suspended
- (I) Ineligible
- (W) Walk-on
- (5th) Fifth year
- Injured
- Current redshirt

Roster
Last update: August 10, 2026

== Schedule and results ==
Date time, TV	Rank^{#}	Opponent^{#}	Result	Record	High points	High rebounds	High assists	Site (attendance) city, state
Regular season
November 2, 2026*; 10:30 a.m., ACCNX		Hofstra	W 80–65	1–0	40 – T. Walker	9 – Foster	5 – Tied	McCamish Pavilion (6,326); Atlanta, GA
November 5, 2026*; 7:00 p.m, ACCNX		Samford	W 84–58	2–0	18 – Ode	8 – Foster	4 – Tied	McCamish Pavilion (2,131); Atlanta, GA
November 8, 2026*; 2:00 p.m., ACCNX		No. 24 West Virginia	L 63–81	2–1	21 – T. Walker	4 – Tied	8 – Moon	McCamish Pavilion (2,875); Atlanta, GA
November 12, 2026*; 7:00 p.m., ACCNX		Maryland Eastern Shore	W 89–58	3–1	18 – Tied	9 – Walker	5 – Tied	McCamish Pavilion (1,918); Atlanta, GA
November 15, 2026*; 2:00 p.m., ACCNX		Georgia State	W 85–54	4–1	20 – Walker	7 – Walker	8 – Moon	McCamish Pavilion (2,532); Atlanta, GA
November 18, 2026*; 6:00 p.m., ACCNX		Georgia; Rivalry						McCamish Pavilion; Atlanta, GA
November 22, 2026*; 1:00 p.m.		at Princeton						Jadwin Gymnasium; Princeton, NJ
November 27, 2026*; 1:30 p.m., ION		vs. TCU; Fort Myers Tip-Off Shell Division						Suncoast Credit Union Arena; Fort Myers, FL
November 28, 2026*; 1:30 p.m., ION		vs. Indiana; Fort Myers Tip-Off Shell Division						Suncoast Credit Union Arena; Fort Myers, FL
December 3, 2026*; 7:00 p.m., SEC Network		at Alabama; ACC–SEC Challenge						Coleman Coliseum; Tuscaloosa, AL
December 6, 2026*; 2:00 p.m., ACCNX		Lipscomb						McCamish Pavilion; Atlanta, GA
December 13, 2026; 2:00 p.m., ACCNX		Pittsburgh						McCamish Pavilion; Atlanta, GA
December 17, 2026; 7:00 p.m., ACC Network		at North Carolina						Carmichael Arena; Chapel Hill, NC
December 21, 2026*; 1:00 p.m., ACCNX		West Georgia						McCamish Pavilion; Atlanta, GA
December 31, 2026; 2:00 p.m., ACCNX		Florida State						McCamish Pavilion; Atlanta, GA
January 3, 2027; 12:00 p.m., ACC Network		at Virginia						John Paul Jones Arena; Charlottesville, VA
January 7, 2027; 7:00 p.m., ACCNX		Clemson						McCamish Pavilion; Atlanta, GA
January 10, 2027; 4:00 p.m., ACCNX		Wake Forest						McCamish Pavilion; Atlanta, GA
January 14, 2027; 7:00 p.m., ACCNX		at Notre Dame						Joyce Center; South Bend, IN
January 18, 2027; 4:00 p.m., ESPN2		NC State						McCamish Pavilion; Atlanta, GA
January 21, 2027; 7:00 p.m., ACCNX		SMU						McCamish Pavilion; Atlanta, GA
January 24, 2027; 2:00 p.m., ACCNX		at Boston College						Conte Forum; Chestnut Hill, MA
January 31, 2027; 6:00 p.m., ACC Network		Syracuse						McCamish Pavilion; Atlanta, GA
February 4, 2027; 10:00 p.m., ACCNX		at Stanford						Maples Pavilion; Stanford, CA
February 7, 2027; 6:00 p.m., ACC Network		at California						Haas Pavilion; Berkeley, CA
February 11, 2027; 8:00 p.m., ACC Network		Duke						McCamish Pavilion; Atlanta, GA
February 14, 2027; 2:00 p.m., ACCNX		at Louisville						KFC Yum! Center; Louisville, KY
February 21, 2027; 2:00 p.m., ACCNX		Virginia Tech						McCamish Pavilion; Atlanta, GA
February 25, 2027; 7:00 p.m., ACCNX		at Clemson						Littlejohn Coliseum; Clemson, SC
February 28, 2027; 2:00 p.m., ACCNX		at Miami (FL)						Watsco Center; Coral Gables, FL
*Non-conference game. ^{#}Rankings from AP Poll. (#) Tournament seedings in parentheses. All times are in Eastern.
