= Independent School District 2142 =

Public school district in Saint Louis County, Minnesota

Independent School District 2142 Saint Louis County Schools

Location
- Saint Louis County, Minnesota United States

District information
- Type: Public
- Grades: K–12
- Superintendent: Dr. Reggie Engebritson
- Schools: Cherry (1928–present); North Woods (2011–present); Northeast Range (2011–present); South Ridge (2011–present); Tower–Soudan Elementary (2011–present)

Students and staff
- Students: 2250+
- Staff: 390+
- Colors: Black/Orange (Cherry); Blue/White (North Woods); Green/White (Northeast Range); Blue/Black (South Ridge)

Other information
- Website: isd2142.net

Independent School District 2142 (ISD 2142) is a school district consisting of five schools in Saint Louis County, Minnesota. It is geographically the largest school District in Minnesota at just over 4,000 square miles.

The school district is currently under the operation of Superintendent Dr. Reggie Engebritson, and seven board members, one or two each for certain districts.

== Schools ==
Traveling north or south, there are no schools in the Eveleth/Virginia area. Three schools are north of Virginia, and the other two to the south. Virginia is also the site of the District Office. The District Office is also home to art displays annually, and is the base of operations for the school board.

School normally starts the day after Labor Day.

There have also been former schools such as Albrook, Cotton, Shaw, and Forbes. Cotton School was purchased in early 2012 by a group of community members and re-opened in Summer of 2012 as Old School Lives, a community outreach center that also features a gym, children's discovery center, and several different retail and thrift shops alongside a coffee house and restaurant.

=== Current schools ===
- South Ridge (Principal Andrew Bernard)
- Northeast Range (Principal Kelly Engman)
- Cherry School (Principal Michael Johnson)
- North Woods (Principal John Vukmanich)
- Tower–Soudan (Principal Kelly Engman)

=== School board members ===
- Christine Taylor 1 (South Ridge)
- Chet Larson 1 (South Ridge)
- Lynette Zupetz 2 (Cherry)
- Dan Manick 2 (North Woods)
- Pat Christensen 1 (North Woods)
- Chris Koivisto 1 (Northeast Range)
- Troy Swanson 2 (Tower–Soudan)
- 1 = Term expires in January 2021
- 2 = Term expires in January 2023

== Recent redistricting ==
=== 2009 redistricting referendum ===
In 2009, community meetings were held to discuss consolidating schools to prevent the district's dissolution. The result was an option that would close Albrook, Cotton, Cook, and Orr, remodel Cherry and Babbit-Embarrass, and remodel Tower-Soudan and turn it into an elementary school. The referendum passed on December 8, 2009 in a special vote, and the plan was set in motion the following year, with all schools beginning construction.

Cotton, Albrook, and Orr closed in 2011, and South Ridge opened. Cook combined with Orr in the Cook building for one year, and Babbitt-Embarrass turned into Northeast Range. Cherry was completed over the Summer of 2011, and North Woods opened on September 4, 2012. All five schools are now complete.

=== Football fields at North Woods and South Ridge ===
For the 2012 Football Season, both North Woods and South Ridge played their first games on their new home fields. The new fields turned out to be not ready for the game, instead being covered in rocks and torn up sod. Johnson Controls corrected the issue at both fields in 2013 by tearing up and re-sodding the field.

=== 2014 Cherry expansion ===
On September 9, 2013, it was announced that due to growing attendance numbers, Cherry will be undergoing an eight room expansion in the near future. Enrollment has grown for Cherry in the past few years from just over three hundred to approximately four hundred and fifty. The expansion began on June 2, 2014, and was completed in December of the same year.

=== 2019-20 Cherry and South Ridge expansion and renovations ===
In 2018, it was announced that due to the growing student population at both schools, both Cherry and South Ridge will be remodeled and/or expanded in the next few years. South Ridge will be expanding to add classrooms in a manner similar to the 2014 Cherry Expansion, whereas Cherry will be receiving further renovations in areas of the school that weren't renovated in 2011 and being expanded at the same time.

=== Integration of new technology ===
In recent years, the district has gone through some technology changes. DELL Netbooks were introduced in Fall 2010, and Hitachi smart boards began being used in classrooms at all five schools during the 2012-2013 school year.

In March 2012, the school board passed a new curriculum that will see all students with iPads In the near future. The 2012–2013 school year saw students in 7th and 8th grade getting iPads to test out the new curriculum. The 2013–2014 school year saw that year's 7th graders and the 10th graders receiving iPad Minis, and 2014–2015 saw the Juniors and Seniors receiving iPad Minis.

In September 2015, the Junior and Senior classes received HP Stream Laptops instead of iPads or iPad Minis.

=== Shared services with Mountain Iron-Buhl ===
As of 2017, ISD 2142 shares several services with the neighboring Mountain Iron-Buhl School District located in Mountain Iron, Minnesota.
