= 2026–27 Stanford Cardinal women's basketball team =

Intercollegiate basketball season

2026–27 Stanford Cardinal women's basketball
- Conference: Atlantic Coast Conference
- Record: 4–2 (0–0 ACC)
- Head coach: Kate Paye (3rd season)
- Associate head coach: Tempie Brown
- Assistant coaches: Heather Oesterle; Steven Key; Erica McCall; Jeanette Pholen
- Home arena: Maples Pavilion

2026–27 ACC women's basketball standings
	Conf.				Overall
Team	W		L	PCT	W		L	PCT
No. 3 Louisville	0	–	0	–	7	–	0	1.000
California	0	–	0	–	6	–	0	1.000
Florida State	0	–	0	–	6	–	0	1.000
Miami (FL)	0	–	0	–	6	–	0	1.000
Virginia	0	–	0	–	6	–	0	1.000
No. 5 Duke	0	–	0	–	5	–	0	1.000
No. 13 Notre Dame	0	–	0	–	5	–	0	1.000
Pittsburgh	0	–	0	–	5	–	0	1.000
Virginia Tech	0	–	0	–	5	–	0	1.000
Clemson	0	–	0	–	6	–	1	.857
Georgia Tech	0	–	0	–	5	–	1	.833
NC State	0	–	0	–	5	–	1	.833
SMU	0	–	0	–	5	–	1	.833
Syracuse	0	–	0	–	4	–	1	.800
Boston College	0	–	0	–	4	–	2	.667
Stanford	0	–	0	–	4	–	2	.667
Wake Forest	0	–	0	–	4	–	2	.667
No. 24 North Carolina	0	–	0	–	3	–	2	.600
† 2027 ACC tournament winner As of November 21, 2026; Rankings from AP Poll

The 2026–27 Stanford Cardinal women's basketball team currently represents Stanford University during the 2026–27 NCAA Division I women's basketball season. The Cardinal, led by third-year head coach Kate Paye, play their home games at Maples Pavilion in Stanford, California, and compete as a member of the Atlantic Coast Conference.

== Previous season ==
The Cardinal finished the 2025–26 season 21–14 overall and 8–10 in ACC play, to finish in a three-way tie for eleventh place in the conference with Georgia Tech and Miami. As the No. 13 seed in the ACC tournament, they lost 76–83 in overtime to No. 12 Miami.

Following their tournament elimination, the Cardinal earned an at-large bid to the WBIT, where they were seeded No. 2 in the BYU Bracket. They defeated unseeded Loyola Marymount and Quinnipiac in the first and second rounds respectively, before falling to top-seeded and eventual tournament runners-up in a 61–76 loss to BYU in the quarterfinals to end their season.

== Offseason ==
=== Departures ===
Stanford departures
Name	Num.	Pos.	Height	Year	Hometown	Reason for departure
Nunu Agara	3	Forward	6'2"	Junior	Minneapolis, MN	Transferred to Maryland
Talana Lepolo	10	Guard	5'7"	Senior	Alameda, CA	Graduated
Carly Amborn	11	Guard	6'2"	Freshman	Larkspur, CA	Transferred to California
Lara Somfai	12	Forward	6'3"	Freshman	Mór, Hungary	Transferred to TCU
Chloe Clardy	13	Guard	5'9"	Junior	Conway, AR	Transferred to North Carolina
Harper Peterson	15	Forward	6'3"	Sophomore	Rocklin, CA	Transferred to Tennessee
Mary Ashley Stevenson	22	Forward	6'2"	Junior	New York, NY	Transferred to Columbia
Stavi Papadaki	24	Guard	5'11"	Senior	Chania, Greece	Graduated
Lauren Green	31	Guard	5'8"	Senior	Castro Valley, CA	Graduated
Courtney Ogden	40	Forward	6'1"	Junior	Atlanta, GA	Transferred to Michigan

=== Incoming transfers ===
Stanford incoming transfers
Name	Num.	Pos.	Height	Year	Hometown	Previous school
Ilse de Vries	3	Forward	6'3"	Junior	Groningen, Netherlands	Miami (OH)
Inés Sotelo	10	Forward	6'3"	Junior	Ourense, Spain	Michigan State
Charlotte Tuhy	13	Forward	6'1"	Sophomore	Madison, NJ	American

=== Recruiting class ===
College recruiting
Name	Hometown	School	Height	Weight	Commit date
Jordyn Wheeler; G	Thorold, ON	Niagara Academy	5 ft 10 in (1.78 m)	N/A	
Jordyn Wheeler; G	Recruit ratings: Rivals: ESPN: (92)				
Elyse Ngenda; G	New Hampton, NH	New Hampton School	5 ft 8 in (1.73 m)	N/A	
Elyse Ngenda; G	Recruit ratings: 247Sports: ESPN: (92)				
Overall recruit ranking:
Note: In many cases, Scout, Rivals, 247Sports, On3, and ESPN may conflict in their listings of height and weight.; In these cases, the average was taken. ESPN grades are on a 100-point scale.; Sources: "2026 Player Commits". ESPN. Archived from the original on August 13, 2026.

== Roster ==
2026–27 Stanford Cardinal women's basketball team
Players
Coaches

Pos.	#	Name	Height	Year	Previous school	Hometown
G	2	Hailee Swain	5 ft 11 in (1.8 m)	So	Holy Innocents' Episcopal School	Marietta, GA
G	3	Ilse de Vries	6 ft 3 in (1.91 m)	Jr	Calandlyceum; Miami (OH)	Groningen, Netherlands
F	4	Alexandra Eschmeyer	6 ft 5 in (1.96 m)	So	Peak to Peak Charter School	Boulder, CO
G	6	Shay Ijiwoye	5 ft 6 in (1.68 m)	Jr	Desert Vista High School	Phoenix, AZ
F	10	Inés Sotelo	6 ft 3 in (1.91 m)	Jr	Porta XI Ensino; Michigan State	Ourense, Spain
F	13	Charlotte Tuhy	6 ft 1 in (1.85 m)	So	Madison High School; American	Madison, NJ
C	15	Kiara Green	6 ft 5 in (1.96 m)	Fr	Century High School	Hillsboro, OR
G	21	Elyse Ngenda	5 ft 9 in (1.75 m)	Fr	New Hampton School	New Hampton, NH
G/F	22	Gracyn Gillard	5 ft 11 in (1.8 m)	Fr	Center Grove High School	Indianapolis, IN
G	23	Jordyn Wheeler	6 ft 0 in (1.83 m)	Fr	Niagara Prep	Thorold, ON
F	25	Nora Ezike	6 ft 2 in (1.88 m)	So	Lyons Township High School	La Grange, IL
C	45	Kennedy Umeh	6 ft 4 in (1.93 m)	Jr	McDonogh School	Columbia, MD

Head coach

- Kate Paye (Stanford)

Assistant coach(es)

- Tempie Brown (Michigan)
- Heather Oesterle (Michigan)
- Steven Key (Boston University)
- Erica McCall (Stanford)
- Jeanette Pholen (Stanford)

Legend

- (C) Team captain
- (S) Suspended
- (I) Ineligible
- (W) Walk-on
- Injured
- Current redshirt

Roster
Last update: August 13, 2026

== Schedule and references ==
Date time, TV	Rank^{#}	Opponent^{#}	Result	Record	High points	High rebounds	High assists	Site (attendance) city, state
Exhibition
October 24, 2026*; 2:00 p.m.		Pacific	W 72–45		18 – Swain	15 – Tuhy	4 – Swain	Maples Pavilion (1,669); Stanford, CA
October 28, 2026*; 6:00 p.m.		UC Santa Barbara	L 56–65		23 – Swain	13 – Tuhy	3 – Sotelo	Maples Pavilion (1,623); Stanford, CA
Regular season
November 2, 2026*; 10:30 a.m., CBSSN		vs. Arizona; Hall of Fame Series – Las Vegas	L 69–84	0–1	21 – Swain	6 – Tied	2 – Tied	T-Mobile Arena; Paradise, NV
November 4, 2026*; 7:00 p.m., ACCNX		Saint Mary's	W 87–54	1–1	22 – Swain	8 – Sotelo Míguez	6 – Sotelo Míguez	Maples Pavilion (1,900); Stanford, CA
November 8, 2026*; 2:00 p.m., ACCNX		UC Davis	W 67–60	2–1	26 – Swain	7 – Tied	5 – Ijiwoye	Maples Pavilion (2,098); Stanford, CA
November 13, 2026*; 7:00 p.m., ESPN+		at Santa Clara	W 66–55	3–1	22 – Swain	8 – Eschmeyer	6 – Ijiwoye	Leavey Center (1,390); Santa Clara, CA
November 15, 2026*; 2:00 p.m., ACCNX		Gonzaga	W 67–65	4–1	20 – Swain	6 – Tied	4 – Ijiwoye	Maples Pavilion (2,405); Stanford, CA
November 20, 2026*; 7:00 p.m., Peacock/NBCSN		at No. 16 Washington	L 50–105	4–2	12 – Swain	6 – Sotelo Míguez	2 – Ijiwoye	Alaska Airlines Arena (3,785); Seattle, WA
November 22, 2026*; 2:00 p.m., ESPN+		at Portland						Chiles Center; Portland, OR
November 27, 2026*; 6:30 p.m.		vs. Columbia; Rainbow Wahine Showdown						Stan Sheriff Center; Honolulu, HI
November 28, 2026*; 4:30 p.m.		vs. San Diego State; Rainbow Wahine Showdown						Stan Sheriff Center; Honolulu, HI
November 29, 2026*; 1:00 p.m.		at Hawaii; Rainbow Wahine Showdown						Stan Sheriff Center; Honolulu, HI
December 2, 2026*; 4:15 p.m., SECN		at Auburn; ACC–SEC Challenge						Neville Arena; Auburn, AL
December 13, 2026; 1:00 p.m., ACCN		at California						Haas Pavilion; Berkeley, CA
December 17, 2026*; 7:00 p.m., ACCNX		Arizona State						Maples Pavilion; Stanford, CA
December 20, 2026*; 5:30 p.m., BTN		vs. Ohio State; Bay Area Women's Classic						Chase Center; San Francisco, CA
December 28, 2026*; 2:00 p.m., ACCNX		Cal Poly						Maples Pavilion; Stanford, CA
December 31, 2026; 4:00 p.m., ACCNX		at Clemson						Littlejohn Coliseum; Clemson, SC
January 3, 2027; 12:00 p.m., ACCNX		at SMU						Moody Coliseum; University Park, TX
January 7, 2027; 7:00 p.m., ACCNX		Miami (FL)						Maples Pavilion; Stanford, CA
January 10, 2027; 11:00 a.m., ACCN		NC State						Maples Pavilion; Stanford, CA
January 14, 2027; 3:00 p.m., ACCNX		at Wake Forest						LJVM Coliseum; Winston-Salem, NC
January 17, 2027; 9:00 a.m., ACCN		at Duke						Cameron Indoor Stadium; Durham, NC
January 21, 2027; 7:00 p.m., ACCNX		Syracuse						Maples Pavilion; Stanford, CA
January 24, 2027; 11:00 a.m., ESPN/2/U		North Carolina						Maples Pavilion; Stanford, CA
January 28, 2027; 4:00 p.m., ACCNX		at Louisville						KFC Yum! Center; Louisville, KY
January 31, 2027; 10:00 a.m., The CW		at Notre Dame						Joyce Center; South Bend, IN
February 4, 2027; 7:00 p.m., ACCNX		Georgia Tech						Maples Pavilion; Stanford, CA
February 7, 2027; 1:00 p.m., ACCN		Florida State						Maples Pavilion; Stanford, CA
February 11, 2027; 7:00 p.m., ACCNX		California						Maples Pavilion; Stanford, CA
February 18, 2027; 3:00 p.m., ACCNX		at Virginia Tech						Cassell Coliseum; Blacksburg, VA
February 21, 2027; 11:00 a.m., ACCN		at Virginia						John Paul Jones Arena; Charlottesville, VA
February 25, 2027; 7:00 p.m., ACCNX		Pittsburgh						Maples Pavilion; Stanford, CA
February 28, 2027; 2:00 p.m., ACCNX		Boston College						Maples Pavilion; Stanford, CA
*Non-conference game. ^{#}Rankings from AP Poll. (#) Tournament seedings in parentheses. All times are in Pacific.
