= 2026–27 Virginia Tech Hokies women's basketball team =

Intercollegiate basketball season

2026–27 Virginia Tech Hokies women's basketball
- Conference: Atlantic Coast Conference
- Record: 5–0 (0–0 ACC)
- Head coach: Megan Duffy (3rd season)
- Associate head coach: Itoro Coleman (3rd season)
- Assistant coaches: Jen Hoover; Sharnee Zoll; Ke'Sha Blanton; Jerod McCullen
- Home arena: Cassell Coliseum

2026–27 ACC women's basketball standings
| | Conf. | | | | Overall |
| Team | W | | L | PCT | W | | L | PCT |
|---|---|---|---|---|---|---|---|---|
| California | 0 | – | 0 | – | 5 | – | 0 | 1.000 |
| No. 7 Louisville | 0 | – | 0 | – | 5 | – | 0 | 1.000 |
| Florida State | 0 | – | 0 | – | 4 | – | 0 | 1.000 |
| Miami (FL) | 0 | – | 0 | – | 4 | – | 0 | 1.000 |
| No. 13 Notre Dame | 0 | – | 0 | – | 4 | – | 0 | 1.000 |
| Pittsburgh | 0 | – | 0 | – | 4 | – | 0 | 1.000 |
| SMU | 0 | – | 0 | – | 4 | – | 0 | 1.000 |
| Virginia | 0 | – | 0 | – | 4 | – | 0 | 1.000 |
| Virginia Tech | 0 | – | 0 | – | 4 | – | 0 | 1.000 |
| Wake Forest | 0 | – | 0 | – | 4 | – | 0 | 1.000 |
| No. 5 Duke | 0 | – | 0 | – | 3 | – | 0 | 1.000 |
| Syracuse | 0 | – | 0 | – | 3 | – | 0 | 1.000 |
| Clemson | 0 | – | 0 | – | 3 | – | 1 | .750 |
| Georgia Tech | 0 | – | 0 | – | 3 | – | 1 | .750 |
| NC State | 0 | – | 0 | – | 3 | – | 1 | .750 |
| Stanford | 0 | – | 0 | – | 3 | – | 1 | .750 |
| Boston College | 0 | – | 0 | – | 2 | – | 2 | .500 |
| No. 23 North Carolina | 0 | – | 0 | – | 2 | – | 2 | .500 |
† 2027 ACC tournament winner As of November 16, 2026; Rankings from AP Poll

The 2026–27 Virginia Tech Hokies women's basketball team currently represents Virginia Tech during the 2026–27 NCAA Division I women's basketball season. The Hokies, led by third-year head coach Megan Duffy, play their home games at Cassell Coliseum in Blacksburg, Virginia and compete as a member of the Atlantic Coast Conference.

== Previous season ==
The Hokies finished the 2025–26 season 23–10 overall and 12–6 in ACC play, to finish in a tie for fifth in the conference with Notre Dame and Syracuse. As the No. 6 seed in the ACC tournament, they earned a bye to the second round, where they defeated No. 11 Georgia Tech 62–54 before falling to No. 3 North Carolina in the quarterfinals.

Following their tournament elimination, the Hokies earned an at-large bid to the NCAA tournament, where they were seeded No. 9 in the Fort Worth #3 Regional. They lost 60–70 in the first round to No. 8 Oregon to end their season.

== Offseason ==
=== Departures ===
Virginia Tech departures
| Name | Number | Pos. | Height | Year | Hometown | Reason for departure |
|---|---|---|---|---|---|---|
| Kilah Freelon | 0 | Forward | 6'1" | Senior | Denver, CO | Graduated |
| Mackenzie Nelson | 3 | Guard | 5'8" | (redshirt) Sophomore | Greenwich, CT | Transferred to Clemson |
| Carys Baker | 10 | Forward | 6'2" | Junior | West Hartford, CT | Transferred to Louisville |
| Špela Brecelj | 11 | Guard/Forward | 6'2" | Freshman | Ajdovščina, Slovenia | Transferred to California Baptist |
| Mel Daley | 21 | Guard | 5'11" | Graduate student | Hastings, NY | Graduated |
| Sophie Swanson | 31 | Guard | 5'10" | Junior | Barrington, IL | Transferred to Dayton |
| Kayl Peterson | 34 | Forward | 6'0" | Sophomore | Waupun, WI | Transferred to Marquette |

=== Incoming transfers ===
Virginia Tech incoming transfers
| Name | Number | Pos. | Height | Year | Hometown | Previous School |
|---|---|---|---|---|---|---|
| Natalee Goff | 4 | Guard | 5'11" | Junior | Lavonia, GA | Emmanuel (D-II) |
| Lauren Hurst | 11 | Guard/Forward | 6'3" | Sophomore | Cleveland, TN | Tennessee |
| Alyssa Latham | 23 | Forward | 6'2" | Graduate student | Glenwood, IL | Tennessee |

=== Recruiting class ===
College recruiting
| Name | Hometown | School | Height | Weight | Commit date |
|---|---|---|---|---|---|
| Kaleo Anderson; G | Mill Creek, WA | King's High School | 5 ft 11 in (1.80 m) | N/A | |
| Kaleo Anderson; G | Recruit ratings: Rivals: ESPN: (93) | | | | |
Overall recruit ranking:
Note: In many cases, Scout, Rivals, 247Sports, On3, and ESPN may conflict in their listings of height and weight.; In these cases, the average was taken. ESPN grades are on a 100-point scale.; Sources: "2026 Player Commits". ESPN. Archived from the original on August 15, 2026.

== Roster ==
Years are listed according to the new NCAA age-based eligibility model.

2026–27 Virginia Tech Hokies women's basketball team
Players
Coaches

| Pos. | # | Name | Height | Year | Previous school | Hometown |
|---|---|---|---|---|---|---|
| G | 1 | Carleigh Wenzel | 6 ft 0 in (1.83 m) | GS | Antonian College Prep | San Antonio, TX |
| G | 2 | Leila Wells | 5 ft 9 in (1.75 m) | Jr | Chelsea High School | Chelsea, MI |
| G | 4 | Natalee Goff | 5 ft 11 in (1.8 m) | Jr | Athens Christian School; Emmanuel | Lavonia, GA |
| C | 6 | Jessica Dimaro | 6 ft 4 in (1.93 m) | Fr | | Yenagoa, Nigeria |
| G | 8 | Francesca Baldassarre | 5 ft 9 in (1.75 m) | Fr | | Brindisi, Italy |
| G | 10 | Kaleo Anderson | 6 ft 0 in (1.83 m) | Fr | King's High School | Mill Creek, WA |
| G/F | 11 | Lauren Hurst (injured) | 6 ft 3 in (1.91 m) | So | Cleveland High School; Tennessee | Cleveland, TN |
| G | 12 | Samyah Suffren | 5 ft 8 in (1.73 m) | Sr | Cannon School | Charlotte, NC |
| G | 13 | Kate Sears | 5 ft 9 in (1.75 m) | So | Watauga High School | Boone, NC |
| F | 23 | Alyssa Latham | 6 ft 2 in (1.88 m) | GS | Homewood-Flossmoor High School; Tennessee | Glenwood, IL |
| F | 24 | Amani Jenkins | 6 ft 3 in (1.91 m) | So | Johnston High School | Johnston, IA |
| F | 25 | Arianna Harris-Mott | 6 ft 4 in (1.93 m) | Fr | St. Vincent Pallotti High School | Columbia, MD |
| F | 30 | Aniya Trent | 6 ft 3 in (1.91 m) | So | Springboro High School | Springboro, OH |

Head coach

- Megan Duffy (Notre Dame)

Assistant coach(es)

- Itoro Coleman (Clemson)
- Jen Hoover (Wake Forest)
- Sharnee Zoll (Virginia)
- Ke'Sha Blanton (Toledo)
- Jerod McCullen (Central Michigan)

Legend

- (C) Team captain
- (S) Suspended
- (I) Ineligible
- (W) Walk-on
- Injured
- Current redshirt

Roster
Last update: August 17, 2026

== Schedule and results ==
| Date time, TV | Rank^{#} | Opponent^{#} | Result | Record | High points | High rebounds | High assists | Site (attendance) city, state |
Exhibition
| October 19, 2026*; 6:00 p.m., B1G+ | | at Maryland | L 82–93 | | 17 – Suffren | 10 – Dimaro | 5 – Suffren | Xfinity Center (1,551); College Park, MD |
Regular season
| November 2, 2026*; 6:00 p.m., ACCNX | | North Carolina Central | W 85–39 | 1–0 | 17 – Wenzel | 13 – Dimaro | 5 – Tied | Cassell Coliseum (4,757); Blacksburg, VA |
| November 4, 2026*; 6:00 p.m., ACCNX | | Delaware | W 101–53 | 2–0 | 19 – Dimaro | 7 – Tied | 4 – Wenzel | Cassell Coliseum (4,592); Blacksburg, VA |
| November 8, 2026*; 6:00 p.m., ACCNX | | James Madison | W 59–43 | 3–0 | 15 – Wenzel | 14 – Dimaro | 4 – Wenzel | Cassell Coliseum (5,189); Blacksburg, VA |
| November 12, 2026*; 6:00 p.m., ESPN+ | | at VCU | W 77–66 | 4–0 | 23 – Dimaro | 24 – Dimaro | 5 – Tied | Siegel Center (2,411); Richmond, VA |
| November 15, 2026*; 2:00 p.m., ACCNX | | La Salle | W 82–63 | 5–0 | 27 – Wenzel | 16 – Dimaro | 6 – Wells | Cassell Coliseum (4,765); Blacksburg, VA |
| November 23, 2026*; 2:30 p.m. | | vs. UT Martin; Emerald Coast Classic first round | | | | | | Raider Arena; Niceville, FL |
| November 24, 2026*; 12:00 or 2:30 p.m. | | vs. Alcorn State or Michigan State; Emerald Coast Classic second round | | | | | | Raider Arena; Niceville, FL |
| November 29, 2026*; 2:00 p.m., ACCNX | | UNC Greensboro | | | | | | Cassell Coliseum; Blacksburg, VA |
| December 3, 2026*; 9:00 p.m., ESPN2 | | Tennessee; ACC–SEC Challenge | | | | | | Cassell Coliseum; Blacksburg, VA |
| December 6, 2026; 2:00 p.m., The CW | | at Duke | | | | | | Cameron Indoor Stadium; Durham, NC |
| December 9, 2026*; 6:00 p.m., ACCNX | | Appalachian State | | | | | | Cassell Coliseum; Blacksburg, VA |
| December 13, 2026*; 5:00 p.m., ACCNX | | Campbell | | | | | | Cassell Coliseum; Blacksburg, VA |
| December 19, 2026; 2:00 p.m., ACCNX | | Wake Forest | | | | | | Cassell Coliseum; Blacksburg, VA |
| December 21, 2026*; 12:00 p.m., ACCNX | | Radford | | | | | | Cassell Coliseum; Blacksburg, VA |
| December 28, 2026*; 2:00 p.m., ACCNX | | Charleston | | | | | | Cassell Coliseum; Blacksburg, VA |
| December 31, 2026; 2:00 p.m., ACCNX | | at Pittsburgh | | | | | | Petersen Events Center; Pittsburgh, PA |
| January 3, 2027; 1:00 p.m., ACC Network | | Syracuse | | | | | | Cassell Coliseum; Blacksburg, VA |
| January 7, 2027; 6:00 p.m., ACCNX | | Notre Dame | | | | | | Cassell Coliseum; Blacksburg, VA |
| January 10, 2027; 2:00 p.m., The CW | | Virginia; Rivalry | | | | | | Cassell Coliseum; Blacksburg, VA |
| January 14, 2027; 7:00 p.m., ACCNX | | at NC State | | | | | | Reynolds Coliseum; Raleigh, NC |
| January 17, 2027; 2:00 p.m., The CW | | Louisville | | | | | | Cassell Coliseum; Blacksburg, VA |
| January 24, 2027; 2:00 p.m., ACC Network | | Florida State | | | | | | Cassell Coliseum; Blacksburg, VA |
| January 28, 2027; 6:00 p.m., ACCNX | | at Boston College | | | | | | Conte Forum; Chestnut Hill, MA |
| January 31, 2027; 2:00 p.m., ACC Network | | California | | | | | | Cassell Coliseum; Blacksburg, VA |
| February 4, 2027; 6:00 p.m., ACC Network | | at Clemson | | | | | | Littlejohn Coliseum; Clemson, SC |
| February 7, 2027; 2:00 p.m., ACC Network | | at North Carolina | | | | | | Carmichael Arena; Chapel Hill, NC |
| February 11, 2027; 6:00 p.m., ACCNX | | SMU | | | | | | Cassell Coliseum; Blacksburg, VA |
| February 18, 2027; 6:00 p.m., ACCNX | | Stanford | | | | | | Cassell Coliseum; Blacksburg, VA |
| February 21, 2027; 2:00 p.m., ACCNX | | at Georgia Tech | | | | | | McCamish Pavilion; Atlanta, GA |
| February 25, 2027; 7:00 p.m., ACCNX | | at Miami (FL) | | | | | | Watsco Center; Coral Gables, FL |
| February 28, 2027; 6:00 p.m., ACC Network | | at Virginia; Rivalry | | | | | | John Paul Jones Arena; Charlottesville, VA |
*Non-conference game. ^{#}Rankings from AP Poll. (#) Tournament seedings in parentheses. All times are in Eastern.
