= 2026–27 Clemson Tigers women's basketball team =

Women's college basketball season

2026–27 Clemson Tigers women's basketball
- Conference: Atlantic Coast Conference
- Record: 3–1 (0–0 ACC)
- Head coach: Shawn Poppie (3rd season)
- Assistant coaches: Chris Ayers (3rd season); Sydni Means (3rd season); Katelyn Grisillo (3rd season); Jon Goldberg (3rd season); Jayda Worthy (3rd season)
- Home arena: Littlejohn Coliseum

2026–27 ACC women's basketball standings
	Conf.				Overall
Team	W		L	PCT	W		L	PCT
No. 7 Louisville	0	–	0	–	5	–	0	1.000
California	0	–	0	–	4	–	0	1.000
Florida State	0	–	0	–	4	–	0	1.000
Miami (FL)	0	–	0	–	4	–	0	1.000
SMU	0	–	0	–	4	–	0	1.000
Virginia	0	–	0	–	4	–	0	1.000
Virginia Tech	0	–	0	–	4	–	0	1.000
Wake Forest	0	–	0	–	4	–	0	1.000
No. 5 Duke	0	–	0	–	3	–	0	1.000
No. 13 Notre Dame	0	–	0	–	3	–	0	1.000
Pittsburgh	0	–	0	–	3	–	0	1.000
Syracuse	0	–	0	–	3	–	0	1.000
Clemson	0	–	0	–	3	–	1	.750
Georgia Tech	0	–	0	–	3	–	1	.750
NC State	0	–	0	–	3	–	1	.750
Stanford	0	–	0	–	2	–	1	.667
Boston College	0	–	0	–	1	–	2	.333
No. 23 North Carolina	0	–	0	–	1	–	2	.333
† 2027 ACC tournament winner As of November 13, 2026; Rankings from AP Poll

The 2026–27 Clemson Tigers women's basketball team will represent Clemson University during the 2026–27 NCAA Division I women's basketball season. The Tigers will be led by third-year head coach Shawn Poppie, and will play their home games at Littlejohn Coliseum in Clemson, South Carolina as a member of the Atlantic Coast Conference.

On August 14, it was announced that incoming freshman Dyarri Braddick had left the team prior to the start of the season.

== Previous season ==
The Tigers finished the 2025–26 season 21–12 overall and 11–7 in ACC play, to finish in a tie for eighth place in the conference with Virginia. Their 21 wins was the most since 2018–19, when the team finished 20–13. As the No. 9 seed in the ACC tournament, they earned a bye to the second round, where they defeated No. 8 Virginia. They were unable to advance further, as they fell to top-seeded and reigning ACC champions Duke in the quarterfinals. Earlier in the season, the Tigers handed Duke their first ACC loss in February when they won 53–51 at home, ending their 17–game win streak.

Following their tournament elimination, the Tigers earned an at-large bid to the NCAA tournament, earning their first appearance since 2019. They were seeded No. 8 in the Sacramento #4 Regional, where they fell in overtime 67–71 to No. 9 USC. Clemson had nearly won the game off of a game-winning three-pointer from guard Mia Moore, which was later waived off following an official review.

== Offseason ==
=== Departures ===
Clemson departures
Name	Number	Pos.	Height	Year	Hometown	Reason for departure
Hannah Kohn	5	Guard	5'9"	Junior	Oviedo, FL	Transferred to South Florida
Taylor Johnson-Matthews	10	Guard	5'9"	Senior	Cleveland, OH	Graduated
Rachael Rose	14	Guard	5'7"	Senior	Scranton, PA	Graduated
Hadley Periman	21	Guard/forward	6'2"	Senior	Tuttle, OK	Graduated
Demeara Hinds	25	Forward	6'3"	Graduate student	Douglasville, GA	Graduated
Morgan Lee	31	Center	6'5"	Senior	Kent, CT	Graduated
Raven Thompson	32	Forward	5'10"	Senior	Atlanta, GA	Graduated

=== Incoming transfers ===
Clemson incoming transfers
Name	Number	Pos.	Height	Year	Hometown	Previous school
Mackenzie Nelson	3	Guard	5'8"	Senior	Greenwich, CT	Virginia Tech
Edie Clarke	7	Forward	6'4"	Junior	Melbourne, Australia	Saint Mary's
Yakiya Milton	8	Forward	6'5"	Senior	Jacksonville, FL	USC
Taliyah Henderson	23	Guard	6'1"	Sophomore	Vail, AZ	North Carolina
Jenna Lawrence	34	Forward	6'3"	Sophomore	Melbourne, AR	Arkansas

=== Recruiting class ===
College recruiting
Name	Hometown	School	Height	Weight	Commit date
Kimora Fields; W	Cleveland, TN	Bradley Central High School	5 ft 11 in (1.80 m)	N/A	
Kimora Fields; W	Recruit ratings: Rivals: 247Sports: ESPN: (95)				
Julia Scott; F	Nanuet, NY	Albertus Magnus High School	6 ft 3 in (1.91 m)	N/A	
Julia Scott; F	Recruit ratings: Rivals: 247Sports: ESPN: (94)				
Meeyah Green; G	Knoxville, TN	Webb School of Knoxville	5 ft 9 in (1.75 m)	N/A	
Meeyah Green; G	Recruit ratings: Rivals: 247Sports: ESPN: (94)				
Overall recruit ranking: ESPN: 13
Note: In many cases, Scout, Rivals, 247Sports, On3, and ESPN may conflict in their listings of height and weight.; In these cases, the average was taken. ESPN grades are on a 100-point scale.; Sources: "2026 Player Commits". ESPN. Archived from the original on August 9, 2026.

== Roster ==
Years are listed according to the new NCAA age-based eligibility model.

2026–27 Clemson Tigers women's basketball team
Players
Coaches

Pos.	#	Name	Height	Year	Previous school	Hometown
G/F	0	Holland Harris	6 ft 1 in (1.85 m)	So	Montverde Academy	Orlando, FL
G	1	Amaia Jackson	5 ft 8 in (1.73 m)	So	Montverde Academy	Rochester, NY
F	2	Ja'Kerra Butler	6 ft 1 in (1.85 m)	So	Hebron Christian Academy	Lawrenceville, GA
G	3	Mackenzie Nelson	5 ft 8 in (1.73 m)	Sr	St. Luke's School; Virginia Tech	Greenwich, CT
F	7	Edie Clarke	6 ft 4 in (1.93 m)	Jr	Geelong High School; St. Mary's	Melbourne, Australia
F	8	Yakiya Milton	6 ft 5 in (1.96 m)	Sr	Mandarin High School; USC	Jacksonville, FL
G	11	Rusne Augustinaite	6 ft 0 in (1.83 m)	Sr	Montverde Academy; Georgia Tech	Šiauliai, Lithuania
G	12	Mia Moore	5 ft 6 in (1.68 m)	GS	St. Francis School; UAB	Alpharetta, GA
F	20	Kimora Fields	6 ft 1 in (1.85 m)	Fr	Bradley Central High School	Cleveland, TN
F	21	Morgan Miller	6 ft 2 in (1.88 m)	Jr	Andover High School	Andover, MN
F	22	Julia Scott	6 ft 3 in (1.91 m)	Fr	Albertus Magnus High School	Nanuet, NY
G	23	Taliyah Henderson	6 ft 1 in (1.85 m)	So	Salpointe Catholic High School; North Carolina	Vail, AZ
G	24	Meeyah Green	5 ft 8 in (1.73 m)	Fr	Webb School of Knoxville	Knoxville, TN
F	34	Jenna Lawrence	6 ft 3 in (1.91 m)	So	Farmington High School; Arkansas	Melbourne, AR

Head coach

- Shawn Poppie (Limestone)

Assistant coach(es)

- Chris Ayers (Florida A&M)
- Sydni Means (Mercer)
- Katelyn Grisillo (USC Aiken)
- Jon Goldberg (Emerson)
- Jayda Worthy (Radford)

Legend

- (C) Team captain
- (S) Suspended
- (I) Ineligible
- (W) Walk-on
- Injured
- Current redshirt

Roster
Last update: October 23, 2026

== Schedule and results ==
Date time, TV	Rank^{#}	Opponent^{#}	Result	Record	High points	High rebounds	High assists	Site (attendance) city, state
Regular season
November 2, 2026*; 12:00 p.m., ACCNX		Radford	W 68–47	1–0	16 – Nelson	6 – Henderson	3 – Nelson	Littlejohn Coliseum (1,032); Clemson, SC
November 5, 2026*; 7:00 p.m., ACCNX		East Tennessee State	W 76–57	2–0	20 – Moore	6 – Scott	7 – Nelson	Littlejohn Coliseum (1,115); Clemson, SC
November 8, 2026*; 2:00 p.m., ACCNX		UNC Greensboro	W 72–44	3–0	15 – Clarke	11 – Clarke	6 – Moore	Littlejohn Coliseum (1,203); Clemson, SC
November 12, 2026*; 7:00 p.m., ESPN/ESPN2		No. 1 South Carolina; Rivalry	L 44–65	3–1	17 – Nelson	7 – Tied	2 – Moore	Littlejohn Coliseum (5,629); Clemson, SC
November 15, 2026*; 5:00 p.m., ACCN		Stetson						Littlejohn Coliseum; Clemson, SC
November 18, 2026*; 6:00 p.m., ACCN		USC Upstate						Littlejohn Coliseum; Clemson, SC
November 20, 2026*; 5:00 p.m., ACCNX		UNC Asheville						Littlejohn Coliseum; Clemson, SC
November 26, 2026*; 11:00 a.m., BallerTV		vs. Robert Morris; Daytona Beach Classic						Ocean Center; Daytona Beach, FL
November 27, 2026*; 1:15 p.m., BallerTV		vs. Georgetown; Daytona Beach Classic						Ocean Center; Daytona Beach, FL
November 29, 2026*; 2:00 p.m., ACCN		Elon						Littlejohn Coliseum; Clemson, SC
December 3, 2026*; 7:00 p.m., ESPN2		at Kentucky; ACC–SEC Challenge						Rupp Arena; Lexington, KY
December 6, 2026*; 6:00 p.m., ACCNX		Gardner–Webb						Littlejohn Coliseum; Clemson, SC
December 13, 2026; 2:00 p.m., ACCN		at Wake Forest						LJVM Coliseum; Winston-Salem, NC
December 15, 2026*; 11:00 a.m., ACCNX		Western Carolina						Littlejohn Coliseum; Clemson, SC
December 20, 2026; 5:30 p.m., ESPN2		at Louisville						KFC Yum! Center; Louisville, KY
December 28, 2026*; 7:00 p.m., ACCNX		Kennesaw State						Littlejohn Coliseum; Clemson, SC
December 31, 2026; 7:00 p.m., ACCNX		Stanford						Littlejohn Coliseum; Clemson, SC
January 3, 2027; 2:00 p.m., The CW		North Carolina						Littlejohn Coliseum; Clemson, SC
January 7, 2027; 7:00 p.m., ACCNX		at Georgia Tech						McCamish Pavilion; Atlanta, GA
January 14, 2027; 7:00 p.m., ACCNX		at SMU						Moody Coliseum; University Park, TX
January 17, 2027; 2:00 p.m., ACCN		Virginia						Littlejohn Coliseum; Clemson, SC
January 21, 2027; 7:00 p.m., ACCNX		Miami (FL)						Littlejohn Coliseum; Clemson, SC
January 24, 2027; 12:00 p.m., ESPN/ESPN2/ESPNU		at Duke						Cameron Indoor Stadium; Durham, NC
January 28, 2027; 6:00 p.m., ACCN		at Pittsburgh						Petersen Events Center; Pittsburgh, PA
February 4, 2027; 6:00 p.m., ACCN		Virginia Tech						Littlejohn Coliseum; Clemson, SC
February 7, 2027; 12:00 p.m., ESPN/ESPN2		Notre Dame						Littlejohn Coliseum; Clemson, SC
February 11, 2027; 6:00 p.m., ACCNX		at Florida State						Donald L. Tucker Civic Center; Tallahassee, FL
February 14, 2027; 12:00 p.m., ACCNX		at Boston College						Conte Forum; Chestnut Hill, MA
February 18, 2027; 8:00 p.m., ACCN		California						Littlejohn Coliseum; Clemson, SC
February 22, 2027; 6:00 p.m., ESPN2		Syracuse						Littlejohn Coliseum; Clemson, SC
February 25, 2027; 7:00 p.m., ACCNX		Georgia Tech						Littlejohn Coliseum; Clemson, SC
February 28, 2027; 12:00 p.m., The CW		at NC State						Reynolds Coliseum; Raleigh, NC
*Non-conference game. ^{#}Rankings from AP Poll. (#) Tournament seedings in parentheses. All times are in Eastern.
