= Cotton School =

Former school in Minnesota

Coordinates: 47°10′28″N 92°28′46″W

Cotton School was a school of the Independent School District 2142 in Northern Minnesota. It was located in Cotton, Minnesota. The school opened in 1922, and closed in June 2011.

== Building ==
The building opened in 1922. Several expansions have been put on. The school contained 2 gyms, a cafeteria, many classrooms, a music room, a large library and a newly constructed playground.

== Closing ==
In an ISD 2142 referendum in December 2009, voters approved the closing of Cotton due to low attendance. The school closed down before the 2011–2012 school year. It was purchased by a non-profit community group that has converted the building to a local community and arts center.

== Principals ==
- Sidney Simonson (2000–2006)
- John Metsa (2006–2008)
- Jeff Carey (2008–2010)
- Kirsti Berlin (2010–2011)
