= 2026–27 Notre Dame Fighting Irish women's basketball team =

Intercollegiate basketball season

2026–27 Notre Dame Fighting Irish women's basketball
- Conference: Atlantic Coast Conference

Ranking
- Coaches: No. 12
- AP: No. 13
- Record: 5–0 (0–0 ACC)
- Head coach: Niele Ivey (7th season)
- Associate head coach: Carol Owens
- Assistant coaches: Charel Allen; Carlos Knox; Jared Newson
- Home arena: Purcell Pavilion

2026–27 ACC women's basketball standings
	Conf.				Overall
Team	W		L	PCT	W		L	PCT
No. 3 Louisville	0	–	0	–	7	–	0	1.000
California	0	–	0	–	5	–	0	1.000
Florida State	0	–	0	–	5	–	0	1.000
Miami (FL)	0	–	0	–	5	–	0	1.000
Virginia	0	–	0	–	5	–	0	1.000
Virginia Tech	0	–	0	–	5	–	0	1.000
No. 5 Duke	0	–	0	–	4	–	0	1.000
No. 13 Notre Dame	0	–	0	–	4	–	0	1.000
Pittsburgh	0	–	0	–	4	–	0	1.000
Syracuse	0	–	0	–	4	–	0	1.000
SMU	0	–	0	–	5	–	1	.833
Clemson	0	–	0	–	4	–	1	.800
Georgia Tech	0	–	0	–	4	–	1	.800
NC State	0	–	0	–	4	–	1	.800
Stanford	0	–	0	–	4	–	1	.800
Wake Forest	0	–	0	–	4	–	1	.800
Boston College	0	–	0	–	3	–	2	.600
No. 24 North Carolina	0	–	0	–	2	–	2	.500
† 2027 ACC tournament winner As of November 19, 2026; Rankings from AP Poll

The 2026–27 Notre Dame Fighting Irish women's basketball team currently represents the University of Notre Dame during the 2026–27 NCAA Division I women's basketball season. The Fighting Irish, led by seventh-year head coach Niele Ivey, play their home games at Purcell Pavilion in Notre Dame, Indiana, and compete as a member of the Atlantic Coast Conference.

== Previous season ==
The Fighting Irish finished the 2025–26 season 25–11 overall and 12–6 in ACC play, to finish in a tie for sixth in the conference with Virginia Tech. As the No. 6 seed in the ACC tournament, they earned a bye to the second round, where they defeated No. 12 Miami, then routed No. 4 NC State in the quarterfinals, before falling 63–65 in the semifinals to top seed and defending ACC champions in Duke.

Following the tournament elimination, the Fighting Irish earned an at-large bid to the NCAA tournament, seeded No. 6 in the Fort Worth #1 Regional. They had big wins in the first and second rounds to No. 11 Fairfield and No. 3 Ohio State to advance to the Sweet Sixteen. Then the Irish were able to take down No. 2 Vanderbilt 67–64 to make it to the Elite Eight for the first time since 2019, where they finished as the national runners-up. However, they could not advance further, as they lost to top-seeded and undefeated UConn 52–70 to end their season.

== Offseason ==
=== Departures ===
Notre Dame departures
Name	Number	Pos.	Height	Year	Hometown	Reason for departure
Vanessa de Jesus	2	Guard	5'8"	Graduate student	Valencia, CA	Graduated
Malaya Cowles	5	Forward	6'3"	Graduate student	Wilkesboro, NC	Graduated
Cassandre Prosper	8	Guard	6'3"	Senior	Montreal, QC	Graduated; selected 19th overall by the Washington Mystics in the 2026 WNBA draft
Bella Tehrani	10	Forward	6'3"	Senior	Hamilton, ON	Walk-on, graduated
Jordyn Smith	11	Guard	5'6"	Graduate student	Granger, IN	Graduated
KK Bransford	14	Guard	5'11"	Senior	Cincinnati, OH	Graduated, transferred to UCLA
Luci Jensen	15	Guard	5'10"	Sophomore	Brookfield, WI	Walk-on, left team
Iyana Moore	23	Guard	5'8"	Graduate student	Milwaukee, WI	Graduated; signed with the UpShot League's Savannah Steel
Gisela Sanchez	30	Forward	6'4"	Graduate student	Barcelona, Spain	Graduated

=== Incoming transfers ===
Notre Dame incoming transfers
Name	Number	Pos.	Height	Year	Hometown	Previous school
Anaya Hardy	9	Forward	6'3"	Junior	Detroit, MI	Louisville
Madison St. Rose	23	Guard	5'10"	5th Year	Old Bridge, NJ	Princeton

=== Recruiting class ===
College recruiting
Name	Hometown	School	Height	Weight	Commit date
Jacy Abii; W	Dallas, TX	Legion Prep Academy	6 ft 2 in (1.88 m)	N/A	
Jacy Abii; W	Recruit ratings: Rivals: 247Sports: ESPN: (97)				
Jenica Lewis; G	Johnston, IA	Johnston High School	5 ft 10 in (1.78 m)	N/A	
Jenica Lewis; G	Recruit ratings: Rivals: 247Sports: ESPN: (95)				
Isabella Ragone; W	Buford, GA	Mill Creek High School	6 ft 2 in (1.88 m)	N/A	
Isabella Ragone; W	Recruit ratings: Rivals: 247Sports: ESPN: (95)				
Amari Byles; F	DeSoto, TX	Kingdom Collegiate Academy	6 ft 2 in (1.88 m)	N/A	
Amari Byles; F	Recruit ratings: Rivals: 247Sports: ESPN: (94)				
Isabella Sangha; F	Boca Raton, FL	Pine Crest School	6 ft 3 in (1.91 m)	N/A	
Isabella Sangha; F	Recruit ratings: Rivals: ESPN: (93)				
Overall recruit ranking: ESPN: 5
Note: In many cases, Scout, Rivals, 247Sports, On3, and ESPN may conflict in their listings of height and weight.; In these cases, the average was taken. ESPN grades are on a 100-point scale.; Sources: "2026 Player Commits". ESPN. Archived from the original on August 8, 2026.

== Roster ==
Years are listed according to the new NCAA age-based eligibility model.

2026–27 Notre Dame Fighting Irish women's basketball team
Players
Coaches

Pos.	#	Name	Height	Year	Previous school	Hometown
G	1	Kelly Ratigan (5th)	5 ft 8 in (1.73 m)	Sr	St. Joseph's High School; Loyola Maryland	South Bend, IN
G/F	2	Jacy Abii	6 ft 2 in (1.88 m)	Fr	Legion Prep	Dallas, TX
G	3	Hannah Hidalgo	5 ft 7 in (1.7 m)	Sr	Paul VI High School	Merchantville, NJ
G	5	Bella Ragone	6 ft 2 in (1.88 m)	Fr	Mill Creek High School	Buford, GA
F	6	Isabella Sangha	6 ft 3 in (1.91 m)	Fr	St. Thomas Aquinas High School	Fort Lauderdale, FL
G	7	Maya Gin	5 ft 9 in (1.75 m)	So	Hinsdale Central High School	Clarendon Hills, IL
F	9	Anaya Hardy	6 ft 3 in (1.91 m)	Jr	Renaissance High School; Louisville	Detroit, MI
G	10	Jenica Lewis	5 ft 10 in (1.78 m)	Fr	Johnston High School	Johnston, IA
G	23	Madison St. Rose (5th)	5 ft 10 in (1.78 m)	Sr	St. John Vianney High School; Princeton	Old Bridge, NJ
G/F	24	Amari Byles	6 ft 2 in (1.88 m)	Fr	Kingdom Collegiate Academy	DeSoto, TX
G	30	Bella Veith	5 ft 6 in (1.68 m)	Fr	Mount Notre Dame High School	Cincinnati, OH
G	32	Mia Veith	5 ft 6 in (1.68 m)	Fr	Mount Notre Dame High School	Cincinnati, OH
F	44	Leah Macy	6 ft 2 in (1.88 m)	So	Bethlehem High School	Elizabethtown, KY

Head coach

- Niele Ivey (Notre Dame)

Assistant coach(es)

- Carol Owens (Northern Illinois)
- Charel Allen (Notre Dame)
- Carlos Knox (IUPUI)
- Jared Newson (UT Martin)

Legend

- (C) Team captain
- (S) Suspended
- (I) Ineligible
- (W) Walk-on
- (5th) Fifth year senior
- Injured
- Current redshirt

Roster
Last update: August 8, 2026

== Schedule and results ==
Date time, TV	Rank^{#}	Opponent^{#}	Result	Record	High points	High rebounds	High assists	Site (attendance) city, state
Exhibition
October 26, 2026*; 7:00 p.m.	No. 13	Truman State	W 125–59		33 – Hidalgo	12 – Macy	9 – Macy	Purcell Pavilion; South Bend, IN
Regular season
November 1, 2026*; 12:00 p.m., FS1	No. 13	vs. Villanova; Eternal City Tip-Off	W 99–75	1–0	32 – Hidalgo	14 – Macy	8 – Hidalgo	Palazzetto dello Sport; Rome, Italy
November 6, 2026*; 7:00 p.m., ACCNX	No. 13	Stonehill	W 123–40	2–0	27 – Hidalgo	14 – Abii	7 – Abii	Purcell Pavilion (4,274); South Bend, IN
November 10, 2026*; 7:00 p.m., ACCNX	No. 13	Detroit Mercy	W 108–60	3–0	23 – Hidalgo	10 – Hidalgo	7 – Abii	Purcell Pavilion (5,527); South Bend, IN
November 14, 2026*; 1:00 p.m., NBC	No. 13	vs. DePaul; Shamrock Classic	W 108–84	4–0	31 – Hidalgo	16 – Hardy	7 – Tied	Colonial Hall (1,020); White Sulphur Springs, WV
November 18, 2026*; 7:00 p.m., ACCNX	No. 13	Southern	W 95–47	5–0	31 – Hidalgo	9 – Tied	4 – Tied	Purcell Pavilion (5,519); South Bend, IN
November 24, 2026*; 1:00 p.m., ESPN+		vs. Davidson; Battle 4 Atlantis						Imperial Arena; Nassau, Bahamas
November 26, 2026*; 11:30 a.m., ESPN2		vs. West Virginia; Battle 4 Atlantis						Imperial Arena; Nassau, Bahamas
December 3, 2026*; 9:00 p.m., ESPN		at Vanderbilt; ACC–SEC Challenge						Memorial Gymnasium; Nashville, TN
December 6, 2026; 12:00 p.m., ACC Network		Florida State						Purcell Pavilion; South Bend, IN
December 9, 2026*; 7:00 p.m., ESPN		UConn; Rivalry						Purcell Pavilion; South Bend, IN
December 13, 2026*; 12:00 p.m., ACC Network		Bowling Green						Purcell Pavilion; South Bend, IN
December 19, 2026*; 11:00 p.m., ESPN		vs. USC; Players Era Women's Festival						Michelob Ultra Arena; Paradise, NV
December 20, 2026*; 7:30 p.m., ESPN		vs. South Carolina; Players Era Women's Festival						Michelob Ultra Arena; Paradise, NV
December 28, 2026; 7:00 p.m., ACCNX		at Pittsburgh						Petersen Events Center; Pittsburgh, PA
December 31, 2026; 5:00 p.m., ACCNX		California						Purcell Pavilion; South Bend, IN
January 3, 2027; 6:00 p.m., ACC Network		at Miami (FL)						Watsco Center; Coral Gables, FL
January 7, 2027; 6:00 p.m., ACCNX		at Virginia Tech						Cassell Coliseum; Blacksburg, VA
January 10, 2027; 2:00 p.m., ABC		Duke						Purcell Pavilion; South Bend, IN
January 14, 2027; 7:00 p.m., ACCNX		Georgia Tech						Purcell Pavilion; South Bend, IN
January 17, 2027; 3:00 p.m., ESPN/2		at Syracuse						JMA Wireless Dome; Syracuse, NY
January 21, 2027; 7:00 p.m., ESPN		at Louisville						KFC Yum! Center; Louisville, KY
January 28, 2027; 6:00 p.m., ESPN		at North Carolina						Carmichael Arena; Chapel Hill, NC
January 31, 2027; 1:00 p.m., The CW		Stanford						Purcell Pavilion; South Bend, IN
February 4, 2027; 8:00 p.m., ACC Network		SMU						Purcell Pavilion; South Bend, IN
February 7, 2027; 12:00 p.m., ESPN/2		at Clemson						Littlejohn Coliseum; Clemson, SC
February 11, 2027; 6:00 p.m., ESPN2		Virginia						Purcell Pavilion; South Bend, IN
February 14, 2027; 2:00 p.m., ACCNX		Wake Forest						Purcell Pavilion; South Bend, IN
February 18, 2027; 8:00 p.m., ESPN2		at NC State						Reynolds Coliseum; Raleigh, NC
February 21, 2027; 2:00 p.m., ACCNX		at Boston College						Conte Forum; Chestnut Hill, MA
February 28, 2027; 12:00 p.m., ESPN		Louisville						Purcell Pavilion; South Bend, IN
*Non-conference game. ^{#}Rankings from AP Poll. (#) Tournament seedings in parentheses. All times are in Eastern.

== Rankings ==
Ranking movements Legend: ██ Increase in ranking ██ Decrease in ranking
	Week																				
Poll	Pre	1	2	3	4	5	6	7	8	9	10	11	12	13	14	15	16	17	18	19	Final
AP	13	13	13																		
Coaches	13	11	12																		
