= 2026–27 Duke Blue Devils women's basketball team =

Intercollegiate basketball season

2026–27 Duke Blue Devils women's basketball
- Conference: Atlantic Coast Conference

Ranking
- Coaches: No. 4
- AP: No. 5
- Record: 6–0 (0–0 ACC)
- Head coach: Kara Lawson (7th season)
- Associate head coach: Tia Jackson (7th season)
- Assistant coaches: Kyra Elzy (3rd season); Karen Lange (5th season); Karen Middleton (4th season); Pierre Miller (4th season)
- Home arena: Cameron Indoor Stadium

2026–27 ACC women's basketball standings
	Conf.				Overall
Team	W		L	PCT	W		L	PCT
No. 3 Louisville	0	–	0	–	7	–	0	1.000
California	0	–	0	–	6	–	0	1.000
Florida State	0	–	0	–	6	–	0	1.000
Miami (FL)	0	–	0	–	6	–	0	1.000
Virginia	0	–	0	–	6	–	0	1.000
No. 5 Duke	0	–	0	–	5	–	0	1.000
No. 13 Notre Dame	0	–	0	–	5	–	0	1.000
Pittsburgh	0	–	0	–	5	–	0	1.000
Virginia Tech	0	–	0	–	5	–	0	1.000
Clemson	0	–	0	–	6	–	1	.857
Georgia Tech	0	–	0	–	5	–	1	.833
NC State	0	–	0	–	5	–	1	.833
SMU	0	–	0	–	5	–	1	.833
Syracuse	0	–	0	–	4	–	1	.800
Boston College	0	–	0	–	4	–	2	.667
Stanford	0	–	0	–	4	–	2	.667
Wake Forest	0	–	0	–	4	–	2	.667
No. 24 North Carolina	0	–	0	–	3	–	2	.600
† 2027 ACC tournament winner As of November 22, 2026; Rankings from AP Poll

The 2026–27 Duke Blue Devils women's basketball team currently represent Duke University during the 2026–27 NCAA Division I women's basketball season. The Blue Devils, led by seventh-year head coach Kara Lawson, play their home games at Cameron Indoor Stadium in Durham, North Carolina, and compete as a member of the Atlantic Coast Conference.

== Previous season ==
The Blue Devils finished the 2025–26 season 27–9 overall and 16–2 in ACC play, finishing as conference regular season champions, doing so for the first time since the 2012–13 season. Their 16–2 conference record was their best finish, also since the 2012–13 season, when they went 17–1. The team's only two ACC losses came in February and early March, when they were upset 51–53 by unranked Clemson, which ended a 17-game win streak, and a 69–74 defeat on the road by No. 21 nationally ranked North Carolina in the final ACC regular season game of the season.

Entering the ACC tournament as the top seed and defending champions, the Blue Devils earned a double-bye to the quarterfinals, where they defeated No. 9 Clemson in a rematch of February's game. They then defeated No. 5 Notre Dame 65–63 in the semifinals thanks to a game-sealing block by sophomore Toby Fournier. Finally, they were able to defend their title by defeating No. 2 Louisville in overtime 70–65, claiming their third consecutive conference championship and earning an automatic bid to the NCAA tournament.

The Blue Devils were seeded No. 3 in the Sacramento #2 Regional, where they routed No. 14 Charleston and No. 6 Baylor in the first and second rounds, respectively, to advance to the Sweet Sixteen, where they pulled off an 87–85 win over No. 2 LSU with a game-winning three-pointer from senior guard Ashlon Jackson to send them to the Elite Eight. They were unable to advance to the Final Four, as they lost 58–70 to top-seeded and eventual national champions in No. 2 UCLA.

== Offseason ==
=== Departures ===
Duke departures
Name	Number	Pos.	Height	Year	Hometown	Reason for departure
Ashlon Jackson	3	Guard	6'0"	Senior	China, TX	Graduated, selected 23rd overall by the Golden State Valkyries in the 2026 WNBA draft
Taina Mair	22	Guard	5'9"	Senior	Boston, MA	Graduated, selected 14th overall by the Seattle Storm in the 2026 WNBA draft
Anna Wikstrom	25	Guard	6'0"	Freshman	Bergen, Norway	Transferred to Colorado State
Hailey Johnson	42	Guard	5'11"	Graduate student	Coto de Caza, CA	Transferred to Loyola Chicago

=== Incoming transfers ===
Duke incoming transfers
Name	Number	Pos.	Height	Year	Hometown	Previous school
Aaliyah Crump	7	Guard	6'1"	Sophomore	Minnetonka, MN	Texas

=== Recruiting class ===
College recruiting
Name	Hometown	School	Height	Weight	Commit date
Autumn Fleary; PG	Baltimore, MD	Sidwell Friends School	5 ft 7 in (1.70 m)	N/A	
Autumn Fleary; PG	Recruit ratings: Rivals: 247Sports: ESPN: (96)				
Bella Flemings; G	San Antonio, TX	William J. Brennan High School	6 ft 0 in (1.83 m)	N/A	
Bella Flemings; G	Recruit ratings: Rivals: 247Sports: ESPN: (96)				
Sanai Green; G	Richmond, VA	Long Island Lutheran High School	6 ft 0 in (1.83 m)	N/A	
Sanai Green; G	Recruit ratings: Rivals: 247Sports: ESPN: (95)				
Taylor Solfikanich; P	South Amboy, NJ	St. John Vianney High School	6 ft 4 in (1.93 m)	N/A	
Taylor Solfikanich; P	Recruit ratings: Rivals: 247Sports: ESPN: (94)				
Overall recruit ranking: ESPN: 4
Note: In many cases, Scout, Rivals, 247Sports, On3, and ESPN may conflict in their listings of height and weight.; In these cases, the average was taken. ESPN grades are on a 100-point scale.; Sources: "2026 Player Commits". ESPN. Archived from the original on August 9, 2026.

== Roster ==
2026–27 Duke Blue Devils women's basketball team
Players
Coaches

Pos.	#	Name	Height	Year	Previous school	Hometown
G	0	Sanai Green	6 ft 0 in (1.83 m)	Fr	Long Island Lutheran High School	Richmond, VA
G/F	2	Jadyn Donovan	6 ft 0 in (1.83 m)	Sr	Sidwell Friends School	Washington, D.C.
G	4	Riley Nelson	6 ft 2 in (1.88 m)	RS Jr	Bullis School; Maryland	Clarksburg, MD
G	5	Emilee Skinner	6 ft 0 in (1.83 m)	RS Fr	Ridgeline High School	Providence, UT
G	7	Aaliyah Crump	6 ft 1 in (1.85 m)	So	Minnetonka High School; Texas	Minnetonka, MN
G	11	Autumn Fleary	5 ft 7 in (1.7 m)	Fr	Sidwell Friends School	Baltimore, MD
F	12	Delaney Thomas	6 ft 3 in (1.91 m)	Sr	St. John's College High School	Charles Town, WV
F	13	Jordan Wood	6 ft 4 in (1.93 m)	Sr	Carmel Catholic High School	Chicago, IL
G	15	Emma Koabel	5 ft 11 in (1.8 m)	GS	Niagara Prep	Port Colborne, ON
C	21	Arianna Roberson	6 ft 4 in (1.93 m)	RS So	Clark High School	San Antonio, TX
G	22	Bella Flemings	6 ft 0 in (1.83 m)	Fr	William J. Brennan High School	San Antonio, TX
F	33	Taylor Solfikanich	6 ft 4 in (1.93 m)	Fr	St. John Vianney High School	South Amboy, NJ
F	35	Toby Fournier	6 ft 2 in (1.88 m)	Jr	Crestwood Preparatory College	Toronto, ON
G	53	Olivia Martin	5 ft 6 in (1.68 m)	GS	Quince Orchard High School	Gaithersburg, MD

Head coach

- Kara Lawson (Tennessee)

Assistant coach(es)

- Tia Jackson (Iowa)
- Kyra Elzy (Tennessee)
- Karen Lange (Iowa)
- Karen Middleton (South Carolina)
- Pierre Miller (Presbyterian)

Legend

- (C) Team captain
- (S) Suspended
- (I) Ineligible
- (W) Walk-on
- Injured
- Current redshirt

Roster
Last update: August 9, 2026

== Schedule and results ==
Date time, TV	Rank^{#}	Opponent^{#}	Result	Record	High points	High rebounds	High assists	Site (attendance) city, state
Regular season
November 3, 2026*; 7:00 p.m., ACCNX	No. 4	Green Bay	W 76–60	1–0	15 – Tied	7 – Thomas	6 – Crump	Cameron Indoor Stadium (2,838); Durham, NC
November 8, 2026*; 2:00 p.m., ESPN+	No. 4	at Florida Atlantic	W 78–56	2–0	14 – Fleary	8 – Nelson	4 – Fleary	Eleanor R. Baldwin Arena (859); Boca Raton, FL
November 12, 2026; 7:00 p.m., MEAC Network	No. 5	at Norfolk State	W 85–23	3–0	20 – Fournier	7 – Tied	5 – Fleary	Joseph G. Echols Memorial Hall (1,982); Norfolk, VA
November 15, 2026*; 3:00 p.m., ACCN	No. 5	Marshall	W 88–51	4–0	16 – Fournier	10 – Tied	3 – Fleary	Cameron Indoor Stadium (3,617); Durham, NC
November 19, 2026*; 11:00 a.m., ACCNX	No. 5	Fordham	W 111–44	5–0	18 – Tied	6 – Roberson	7 – Skinner	Cameron Indoor Stadium (3,051); Durham, NC
November 21, 2026*; 7:00 p.m., ESPN+	No. 5	at Columbia	W 71–47	6–0	17 – Skinner	6 – Tied	7 – Skinner	Levien Gymnasium (2,557); New York, NY
November 28, 2026*; 7:00 p.m., FOX		vs. UConn; Bad Boy Mower Series – Boston						TD Garden; Boston, MA
December 3, 2026*; 7:00 p.m., ESPN		South Carolina; ACC–SEC Challenge						Cameron Indoor Stadium; Durham, NC
December 6, 2026; 2:00 p.m., The CW		Virginia Tech						Cameron Indoor Stadium; Durham, NC
December 16, 2026*; 7:00 p.m., ION		vs. UCLA; Scripps Sports Women’s Basketball Showcase						Mortgage Matchup Center; Phoenix, AZ
December 19, 2026*; 6:00 p.m., ESPN2		vs. Texas; Players Era Women's Festival						Michelob Ultra Arena; Paradise, NV
December 20, 2026*; 10:00 p.m., ESPN		vs. USC; Players Era Women's Festival						Michelob Ultra Arena; Paradise, NV
December 28, 2026; 6:00 p.m., ACCN		Syracuse						Cameron Indoor Stadium; Durham, NC
December 31, 2026; 8:00 p.m., ACCN		at Virginia						John Paul Jones Arena; Charlottesville, VA
January 3, 2027; 3:00 p.m., ESPN		at NC State						Reynolds Coliseum; Raleigh, NC
January 10, 2027; 12:00 p.m., ABC		at Notre Dame						Joyce Center; South Bend, IN
January 14, 2027; 7:00 p.m., ACCNX		California						Cameron Indoor Stadium; Durham, NC
January 17, 2027; 12:00 p.m., ACCN		Stanford						Cameron Indoor Stadium; Durham, NC
January 21, 2027; 6:00 p.m., ACCN		at Boston College						Conte Forum; Chestnut Hill, MA
January 24, 2027; 12:00 p.m., ESPN/ESPN2/ESPNU		Clemson						Cameron Indoor Stadium; Durham, NC
January 28, 2027; 8:00 p.m., ACCN		at Florida State						Donald L. Tucker Civic Center; Tallahassee, FL
January 31, 2027; 5:00 p.m., ESPN		at North Carolina; Rivalry						Carmichael Arena; Chapel Hill, NC
February 7, 2027; 2:00 p.m., The CW		Miami (FL)						Cameron Indoor Stadium; Durham, NC
February 11, 2027; 8:00 p.m., ACCN		at Georgia Tech						McCamish Pavilion; Atlanta, GA
February 14, 2027; 12:00 p.m., ACCNX		Pittsburgh						Cameron Indoor Stadium; Durham, NC
February 18, 2027; 7:00 p.m., ESPN		Louisville						Cameron Indoor Stadium; Durham, NC
February 21, 2027; 6:00 p.m., ACCN		at Wake Forest						LJVM Coliseum; Winston-Salem, NC
February 25, 2027; 6:00 p.m., ACCN		at SMU						Moody Coliseum; University Park, TX
February 28, 2027; 4:00 p.m., ESPN		North Carolina; Rivalry						Cameron Indoor Stadium; Durham, NC
*Non-conference game. ^{#}Rankings from AP Poll. (#) Tournament seedings in parentheses. All times are in Eastern.

== Rankings ==
Ranking movements Legend: ██ Increase in ranking ██ Decrease in ranking
	Week																				
Poll	Pre	1	2	3	4	5	6	7	8	9	10	11	12	13	14	15	16	17	18	19	Final
AP	4	5	5																		
Coaches	4	5	4																		
