= 2026–27 Virginia Cavaliers women's basketball team =

Intercollegiate basketball season

2026–27 Virginia Cavaliers women's basketball
- Conference: Atlantic Coast Conference
- Record: 6–0 (0–0 ACC)
- Head coach: Aaron Roussell (1st season)
- Associate head coach: Kelly Rae Finley
- Assistant coaches: Darren Guensch; Ariel Stephenson; Kia Damon-Olson; Alex Louin
- Home arena: John Paul Jones Arena

2026–27 ACC women's basketball standings
	Conf.				Overall
Team	W		L	PCT	W		L	PCT
No. 3 Louisville	0	–	0	–	7	–	0	1.000
Florida State	0	–	0	–	6	–	0	1.000
Miami (FL)	0	–	0	–	6	–	0	1.000
Virginia	0	–	0	–	6	–	0	1.000
California	0	–	0	–	5	–	0	1.000
No. 5 Duke	0	–	0	–	5	–	0	1.000
No. 13 Notre Dame	0	–	0	–	5	–	0	1.000
Pittsburgh	0	–	0	–	5	–	0	1.000
Virginia Tech	0	–	0	–	5	–	0	1.000
Clemson	0	–	0	–	5	–	1	.833
Georgia Tech	0	–	0	–	5	–	1	.833
NC State	0	–	0	–	5	–	1	.833
SMU	0	–	0	–	5	–	1	.833
Stanford	0	–	0	–	4	–	1	.800
Syracuse	0	–	0	–	4	–	1	.800
Wake Forest	0	–	0	–	4	–	2	.667
Boston College	0	–	0	–	3	–	2	.600
No. 24 North Carolina	0	–	0	–	3	–	2	.600
† 2027 ACC tournament winner As of November 20, 2026; Rankings from AP Poll

The 2026–27 Virginia Cavaliers women's basketball team currently represents the University of Virginia during the 2026–27 NCAA Division I women's basketball season. The Cavaliers will be led by fourth-year head coach Aaron Roussell, and will play their home games at John Paul Jones Arena in Charlottesville, Virginia as a member of the Atlantic Coast Conference.

== Previous season ==
The Cavaliers finished the 2025–26 season 22–11 overall and 11–7 in ACC play, to finish in a tie for eighth in the conference with Clemson. They lost to the Tigers 50–63 in the second round of the ACC tournament.

Following their tournament elimination, the Cavaliers earned an at-large bid to the NCAA tournament, their first since 2018. They were placed into the First Four as one of the two No. 10 seeds in the Sacramento #4 Regional, where they won against Arizona State 57–55 to advance to the field of 64. In the first round, they defeated No. 7 Georgia 82–73 in overtime, before pulling off the only official upset of the tournament by defeating No. 2 Iowa 83–75 in double overtime to advance to their first Sweet Sixteen since 2000, and becoming the only team in NCAA women's basketball tournament history to do so from the First Four. Their cinderella run came to an end as the Cavaliers lost 69–79 to No. 3 TCU. On April 6, following the exit, the Cavaliers came in at No. 19 on the Associated Press Top 25 poll, their first ranking since 2011.

On April 5, 2026, head coach Amaka Agugua-Hamilton was fired after four seasons with the program. This came after an internal investigation into Agugua-Hamilton, in which she was alleged to have mistreated staff and players and fostered a "nightmarish" culture within the team. The university and Agugua-Hamilton reached a settlement in July.

On April 7, the school announced the hiring of Richmond women's basketball head coach Aaron Roussell to lead the program. Roussell coached the Spiders for seven seasons, leading them to a 148–72 record and three consecutive NCAA tournaments.

== Offseason ==
=== Departures ===
Virginia departures
Name	Number	Pos.	Height	Year	Hometown	Reason for departure
Paris Clark	1	Guard	5'8"	Senior	The Bronx, NY	Graduated
Raiane Dias Dos Santos	2	Guard	5'9"	(redshirt) Junior	São Paulo, Brazil	Transferred to Stony Brook
Gabby White	3	Guard	5'10"	Freshman	Chapel Hill, NC	Transferred to North Carolina
Jillian Brown	4	Guard	5'11"	Graduate student	Grand Rapids, MI	Graduated
Sa'Myah Smith	5	Forward	6'2"	(redshirt) Junior	Texarkana, TX	Transferred to Oklahoma
Caitlin Weimar	12	Forward	6'4"	Graduate student	Cortlandt Manor, NY	Graduated
Romi Levy	23	Guard	6'3"	Graduate student	Herzliya, Israel	Graduated
Danielle Arigbabu	28	Forward	6'4"	Graduate student	Berlin, Germany	Graduated

=== Incoming transfers ===
Virginia incoming transfers
Name	Number	Pos.	Height	Year	Hometown	Previous school
Eris Lester	4	Guard	5'11"	Junior	Jacksonville, FL	Alabama
Mary-Anna Asare	10	Guard	5'8"	Graduate student	Pickering, ON	VCU
Caterina Piatti	12	Forward	6'4"	Sophomore	Scandiano, Italy	Florida
Janaé Walker	44	Forward	6'3"	Senior	Tyrone, GA	Rutgers

=== Recruiting class ===
College recruiting
Name	Hometown	School	Height	Weight	Commit date
Erica Gibble; G	Greensburg, PA	Greensburg Central Catholic High School	5 ft 11 in (1.80 m)	N/A	
Erica Gibble; G	Recruit ratings: Rivals: ESPN: (93)				
Overall recruit ranking:
Note: In many cases, Scout, Rivals, 247Sports, On3, and ESPN may conflict in their listings of height and weight.; In these cases, the average was taken. ESPN grades are on a 100-point scale.; Sources: "2026 Player Commits". ESPN. Archived from the original on August 15, 2026.

== Roster ==
Years are listed according to the new NCAA age-based eligibility model.

2026–27 Virginia Cavaliers women's basketball team
Players
Coaches

Pos.	#	Name	Height	Year	Previous school	Hometown
G	0	Olivia McGhee	6 ft 2 in (1.88 m)	Sr	IMG Academy	Louisa, VA
G	1	Emilie Brzonova	5 ft 11 in (1.8 m)	Fr	Faenza Basket Project	Czech Republic
F	2	Lyla Coogen	6 ft 3 in (1.91 m)	Fr	The St. James Academy	Arlington, VA
G	3	Erica Gibble	5 ft 11 in (1.8 m)	Fr	Greensburg Central Catholic High School	Greensburg, PA
G	4	Eris Lester	5 ft 11 in (1.8 m)	Jr	Montverde Academy; Alabama	Jacksonville, FL
F	7	Tabitha Amanze (5th)	6 ft 4 in (1.93 m)	Sr	Blair Academy; Princeton	Ogun, Nigeria
F	8	Adeang Ring	6 ft 5 in (1.96 m)	Jr	Bella Vista College Prep; UCF	Sydney, Australia
G	9	Sintija Aukštikalnytė	5 ft 10 in (1.78 m)	Fr		Lithuania
G	10	Mary-Anna Asare (5th)	5 ft 8 in (1.73 m)	GS	J. Addison School; VCU	Pickering, Ontario
F	12	Caterina Piatti	6 ft 4 in (1.93 m)	So	Lupe San Marino; Florida	Scandiano, Italy
G	21	Kymora Johnson	5 ft 7 in (1.7 m)	Sr	St. Anne's-Belfield School	Charlottesville, VA
F	32	Breona Hurd	6 ft 2 in (1.88 m)	Jr	Waynesville High School	Waynesville, MO
F	44	Janaé Walker	6 ft 3 in (1.91 m)	Sr	Sandy Creek High School; Rutgers	Tyrone, GA

Head coach

- Aaron Roussell (Iowa)

Assistant coach(es)

- Kelly Rae Finley (Colorado State)
- Darren Guensch (Radford)
- Ariel Stephenson (Wake Forest)
- Kia Damon-Olson (Millersville)
- Alex Louin (Villanova)

Legend

- (C) Team captain
- (S) Suspended
- (I) Ineligible
- (W) Walk-on
- (5th) Fifth year senior
- Injured
- Current redshirt

Roster
Last update: August 15, 2026

== Schedule and results ==
Date time, TV	Rank^{#}	Opponent^{#}	Result	Record	High points	High rebounds	High assists	Site (attendance) city, state
Regular season
November 2, 2026*; 6:00 p.m., ACCNX		Maryland Eastern Shore	W 87–45	1–0	21 – Johnson	12 – Hurd	4 – Johnson	John Paul Jones Arena (3,805); Charlottesville, VA
November 5, 2026*; 7:00 p.m., ESPN+		at Davidson	W 72–57	2–0	25 – Johnson	8 – Hurd	5 – Johnson	John M. Belk Arena (1,086); Davidson, NC
November 8, 2026*; 2:00 p.m., ACCNX		William & Mary	W 99–58	3–0	22 – Johnson	7 – Hurd	4 – Johnson	John Paul Jones Arena (4,008); Charlottesville, VA
November 11, 2026*; 6:00 p.m., ACCNX		Drexel	W 81–39	4–0	18 – Hurd	9 – Lester	5 – Johnson	John Paul Jones Arena (3,724); Charlottesville, VA
November 15, 2026*; 2:00 p.m., ESPN+		at Old Dominion	W 80–61	5–0	24 – Piatti	10 – Johnson	9 – Johnson	Chartway Arena (2,280); Norfolk, VA
November 19, 2026*; 6:00 p.m., ACCN		James Madison	W 60–51	6–0	14 – Tied	11 – Hurd	8 – Johnson	John Paul Jones Arena (4,246); Charlottesville, VA
November 23, 2026*; 2:30 p.m.		vs. Oklahoma; Jacksonville Classic						The Reef; Jacksonville, FL
November 24, 2026*; 9:00 p.m.		vs. UAB; Jacksonville Classic						The Reef; Jacksonville, FL
November 29, 2026; 6:00 p.m., ACCN		at SMU						Moody Coliseum; University Park, TX
December 3, 2026*; 9:00 p.m., ESPNU		at Mississippi State; ACC–SEC Challenge						Humphrey Coliseum; Starkville, MS
December 6, 2026; 2:00 p.m., ACCNX		Boston College						John Paul Jones Arena; Charlottesville, VA
December 9, 2026*; 11:00 a.m., ACCNX		American						John Paul Jones Arena; Charlottesville, VA
December 13, 2026*; 6:00 p.m., ACCN		Navy						John Paul Jones Arena; Charlottesville, VA
December 20, 2026*; 3:30 p.m., ESPN2		vs. Kentucky; Sprouts Farmers Market espnW Invitational						Bridgestone Arena; Nashville, TN
December 22, 2026*; 1:00 p.m., ACCNX		Stony Brook						John Paul Jones Arena; Charlottesville, VA
December 28, 2026*; 6:00 p.m., ACCNX		Norfolk State						John Paul Jones Arena; Charlottesville, VA
December 31, 2026; 8:00 p.m., ACCN		Duke						John Paul Jones Arena; Charlottesville, VA
January 3, 2027; 12:00 p.m., ACCN		Georgia Tech						John Paul Jones Arena; Charlottesville, VA
January 10, 2027; 2:00 p.m., The CW		Virginia Tech; Rivalry						John Paul Jones Arena; Charlottesville, VA
January 14, 2027; 7:00 p.m., ACCNX		at Miami (FL)						Watsco Center; Coral Gables, FL
January 17, 2027; 2:00 p.m., ACCN		at Clemson						Littlejohn Coliseum; Clemson, SC
January 21, 2027; 6:00 p.m., ACCNX		Wake Forest						John Paul Jones Arena; Charlottesville, VA
January 24, 2027; 2:00 p.m., ACCNX		at Pittsburgh						Petersen Events Center; Pittsburgh, PA
January 28, 2027; 6:00 p.m., ACCNX		California						John Paul Jones Arena; Charlottesville, VA
February 1, 2027; 6:00 p.m., ESPN2		at NC State						Reynolds Coliseum; Raleigh, NC
February 7, 2027; 2:00 p.m., ESPN/ESPN2		Louisville						John Paul Jones Arena; Charlottesville, VA
February 11, 2027; 6:00 p.m., ESPN2		at Notre Dame						Joyce Center; South Bend, IN
February 14, 2027; 2:00 p.m., ACCNX		at Syracuse						JMA Wireless Dome; Syracuse, NY
February 18, 2027; 6:00 p.m., ACCNX		Florida State						John Paul Jones Arena; Charlottesville, VA
February 21, 2027; 2:00 p.m., ACCN		Stanford						John Paul Jones Arena; Charlottesville, VA
February 25, 2027; 8:00 p.m., ACCN		at North Carolina						Carmichael Arena; Chapel Hill, NC
February 28, 2027; 6:00 p.m., ACCN		at Virginia Tech; Rivalry						Cassell Coliseum; Blacksburg, VA
*Non-conference game. ^{#}Rankings from AP Poll. (#) Tournament seedings in parentheses. All times are in Eastern.

== Rankings ==
Ranking movements Legend: RV = Received votes
	Week																				
Poll	Pre	1	2	3	4	5	6	7	8	9	10	11	12	13	14	15	16	17	18	19	Final
AP	RV																				
Coaches	RV																				
