= Mountain Iron-Buhl School District =

Public school district in Minnesota, United States

Mountain Iron‑Buhl School District

Location
- Mountain Iron, Minnesota St. Louis County, Minnesota United States

District information
- Type: Public
- Grades: K–12
- Established: 1992
- Superintendent: Dr. Reggie Engebritson
- Schools: 1
- NCES District ID: 2712270

Students and staff
- Students: 525 (2023–24)
- Student–teacher ratio: ≈12:1
- Athletic conference: Polar League Conference

Other information
- Website: www.mib.k12.mn.us

Mountain Iron‑Buhl School District (ISD 712) is a public school district in St. Louis County, Minnesota. It was formed in 1992 through the consolidation of the Mountain Iron and Buhl school districts. The district operates one K–12 campus in Mountain Iron.

== Administration ==
The superintendent is Dr. Reggie Engebritson. In January 2025, the school board voted to implement a four-day instructional week beginning in the 2025–26 school year.

== Academics ==
In 2023, the district reported a four-year graduation rate above 90%. High school students may enroll in college-level courses through a partnership with Mesabi Range College.

== Facilities ==
The district operates a single school building that includes separate elementary, middle, and high school areas. Shared facilities include a gymnasium, media center, and outdoor athletic fields.

== Athletics ==
Mountain Iron‑Buhl High School participates in the Polar League Conference and is a member of the Minnesota State High School League. The following state championships have been won by the district and its predecessor schools:

Year	School	Sport	Classification
1941	Buhl High School	Boys basketball	Single-class
1942	Buhl High School	Boys basketball	Single-class
1972	Mountain Iron High School	Football	Class B
2022	Mountain Iron‑Buhl High School	Football	Class 9‑Man
2023	Mountain Iron‑Buhl High School	Girls basketball	Class 1A

In January 2025, girls' basketball coach Jeff Buffetta reached 600 career wins.

== Notable alumni ==
- Matt Niskanen (Class of 2005) – Hockey player; 13-year NHL career; 2018 Stanley Cup winner with the Washington Capitals.
