= 2026–27 Boston College Eagles women's basketball team =

Intercollegiate basketball season

2026–27 Boston College Eagles women's basketball
- Conference: Atlantic Coast Conference
- Record: 0–1 (0–0 ACC)
- Head coach: Kate Popovec-Goss (1st season)
- Associate head coach: Carrie Banks
- Assistant coaches: Ollie Goss; JerShon Cobb; Stephanie Miller; Jahari Smith
- Home arena: Conte Forum

2026–27 ACC women's basketball standings
	Conf.				Overall
Team	W		L	PCT	W		L	PCT
No. 13 Notre Dame	0	–	0	–	1	–	0	1.000
Boston College	0	–	0	–	0	–	0	–
California	0	–	0	–	0	–	0	–
Clemson	0	–	0	–	0	–	0	–
No. 4 Duke	0	–	0	–	0	–	0	–
Florida State	0	–	0	–	0	–	0	–
Georgia Tech	0	–	0	–	0	–	0	–
No. 7 Louisville	0	–	0	–	0	–	0	–
Miami (FL)	0	–	0	–	0	–	0	–
No. 25 NC State	0	–	0	–	0	–	0	–
No. 12 North Carolina	0	–	0	–	0	–	0	–
Pittsburgh	0	–	0	–	0	–	0	–
SMU	0	–	0	–	0	–	0	–
Stanford	0	–	0	–	0	–	0	–
Syracuse	0	–	0	–	0	–	0	–
Virginia	0	–	0	–	0	–	0	–
Virginia Tech	0	–	0	–	0	–	0	–
Wake Forest	0	–	0	–	0	–	0	–
† 2027 ACC tournament winner As of November 1, 2026; Rankings from AP Poll

The 2026–27 Boston College Eagles women's basketball team currently represents Boston College during the 2026–27 NCAA Division I women's basketball season. The Eagles, led by first-year head coach Katie Popovec-Goss, play their home games at the Conte Forum in Chestnut Hill, Massachusetts and compete as a member of the Atlantic Coast Conference.

== Previous season ==
The Eagles finished the 2025–26 season 5–26 overall and 1–17 in ACC play, to finish in a tie for last in the conference with Pittsburgh. They failed to qualify for the ACC tournament.

On March 1, 2026, it was announced that head coach Joanna Bernabei-McNamee had not had her contract extended, and had been fired after eight seasons with the program. Nearly a month later, on March 27, Bradley women's basketball head coach Kate Popovec-Goss was announced as the team's new head coach.

== Offseason ==
=== Departures ===
Boston College departures
Name	Num.	Pos.	Height	Year	Hometown	Reason for departure
Erin Hopft	1	Guard	5'6"	(redshirt) Senior	Danville, IL	Graduated
Teionni McDaniel	2	Guard	5'9"	Graduate student	Las Vegas, NV	Graduated
Ava McGee	3	Guard	5'10"	Senior	Washington, D.C.	Graduated; entered transfer portal
Lily Carmody	8	Guard	5'11"	Sophomore	Melbourne, Australia	Transferred to Northwestern
Kaia Henderson	11	Guard	5'6"	(redshirt) Junior	Utica, NY	Entered transfer portal
Emma LoPinto	13	Guard	5'4"	Graduate student	Manhasset, NY	Walk-on; graduated
Amirah Anderson	21	Guard	5'11"	Freshman	Stafford, VA	Transferred to Alabama
Kayla Rolph	23	Forward	6'2"	Senior	Great Falls, VA	Graduated
Kiera Edmonds	24	Forward	6'2"	(redshirt) Sophomore	Brooklyn, NY	Transferred to Toledo
Kennedy Hall	31	Forward	6'3"	Freshman	Indian Head, MD	Transferred to Hampton

=== Incoming transfers ===
Boston College incoming transfers
Name	Num.	Pos.	Height	Year	Hometown	Previous school
Natalia Hall-Rosa	3	Guard/Forward	6'0"	Sophomore	Randolph, MA	Seton Hall
Grace Oliver	13	Forward	6'1"	Junior	Norwell, MA	Wake Forest
Megan Hollingsworth	15	Guard	6'0"	Sophomore	Ottawa, ON	Pittsburgh

=== Recruiting class ===
There was no 2026 recruiting class.

== Roster ==
2026–27 Boston College Eagles women's basketball team
Players
Coaches

Pos.	#	Name	Height	Year	Previous school	Hometown
G	0	Athena Tomlinson	5 ft 5 in (1.65 m)	Jr	Clovis West	Fresno, CA
F	1	Samantha Davis	6 ft 0 in (1.83 m)	Fr	Aquinas	La Crosse, WI
G/F	3	Natalia Hall-Rosa	6 ft 0 in (1.83 m)	So	The Rivers School; Seton Hall	Randolph, MA
G	4	Jocelyne Grier	5 ft 8 in (1.73 m)	So	Winston Salem Christian School	Charlotte, NC
F	10	Nora Arozena	6 ft 1 in (1.85 m)	Fr		Azkoitia, Spain
G	11	Daniele Paunksnyte	5 ft 10 in (1.78 m)	Fr	Vilnius Ozo gymnasium	Mazeikiai, Lithuania
F	13	Grace Oliver	6 ft 1 in (1.85 m)	Jr	Noble & Greenough School; Wake Forest	Norwell, MA
F	14	Eunicia Salgado	6 ft 1 in (1.85 m)	Fr	Royal Crown School	Boucherville, QC
G	15	Megan Hollingsworth	6 ft 0 in (1.83 m)	So	Capital Courts Academy; Pittsburgh	Ottawa, ON
C	17	Gabriela Bernal Ortellado	6 ft 3 in (1.91 m)	Fr	Edison Academics	Asunción, Paraguay
F	23	Nuria Ausaverri	6 ft 1 in (1.85 m)	Fr	Colegio San José del Parque	Madrid, Spain
F	33	Eleanor Trout	6 ft 3 in (1.91 m)	RS Fr	Templestowe College	Melbourne, Australia

Head coach

- Kate Popovec-Goss (Northwestern)

Assistant coach(es)

- Carrie Banks (Detroit Mercy)
- Ollie Goss (Bowling Green)
- JerShon Cobb (Northwestern)
- Stephanie Miller (Michigan State)
- Jahari Smith (Central Michigan)

Legend

- (C) Team captain
- (S) Suspended
- (I) Ineligible
- (W) Walk-on
- Injured
- Current redshirt

Roster
Last update: August 8, 2026

== Schedule and results ==
Date time, TV	Rank^{#}	Opponent^{#}	Result	Record	High points	High rebounds	High assists	Site (attendance) city, state
Regular season
November 2, 2026*; 6:00 p.m., ACCNX		Holy Cross	L 54–64	0–1	13 – Tied	14 – Paunksnyte	3 – Tomlinson	Conte Forum (536); Chestnut Hill, MA
November 5, 2026*; 7:00 p.m., ESPN+		at Harvard						Lavietes Pavilion; Cambridge, MA
November 11, 2026*; 6:00 p.m., ACCNX		UMass Lowell						Conte Forum; Chestnut Hill, MA
November 14, 2026*; 12:00 p.m., ACCNX		Providence						Conte Forum; Chestnut Hill, MA
November 17, 2026*; 6:00 p.m., ACCNX		Merrimack						Conte Forum; Chestnut Hill, MA
November 20, 2026*; 6:00 p.m., ACCNX		UMass						Conte Forum; Chestnut Hill, MA
November 24, 2026*; 6:00 p.m., ACCNX		Northeastern						Conte Forum; Chestnut Hill, MA
November 27, 2026*; 12:00 p.m.		vs. Charleston; St. Pete's Showcase						McArthur Center; St. Petersburg, FL
November 28, 2026*; 2:30 p.m.		vs. BYU; St. Pete's Showcase						McArthur Center; St. Petersburg, FL
December 2, 2026*; 7:00 p.m., B1G+		at Indiana						Simon Skjodt Assembly Hall; Bloomington, IN
December 6, 2026; 2:00 p.m., ACCNX		at Virginia						John Paul Jones Arena; Charlottesville, VA
December 10, 2026*; 11:00 a.m., ACCNX		Bryant						Conte Forum; Chestnut Hill, MA
December 13, 2026*; 2:00 p.m., ESPN+		at Quinnipiac						M&T Bank Arena; Hamden, CT
December 22, 2026; 12:00 p.m., ACCNX		at Miami (FL)						Watsco Center; Coral Gables, FL
December 31, 2026; 12:00 p.m., ACCNX		Louisville						Conte Forum; Chestnut Hill, MA
January 3, 2027; 2:00 p.m., ACCNX		Florida State						Conte Forum; Chestnut Hill, MA
January 7, 2027; 6:00 p.m., ACCNX		SMU						Conte Forum; Chestnut Hill, MA
January 14, 2027; 6:00 p.m., ACCNX		at Syracuse						JMA Wireless Dome; Syracuse, NY
January 17, 2027; 6:00 p.m., ACCN		at North Carolina						Carmichael Arena; Chapel Hill, NC
January 21, 2027; 6:00 p.m., ACCN		Duke						Conte Forum; Chestnut Hill, MA
January 24, 2027; 2:00 p.m., ACCNX		Georgia Tech						Conte Forum; Chestnut Hill, MA
January 28, 2027; 6:00 p.m., ACCNX		Virginia Tech						Conte Forum; Chestnut Hill, MA
January 31, 2027; 2:00 p.m., ACCNX		at Pittsburgh						Petersen Events Center; Pittsburgh, PA
February 7, 2027; 2:00 p.m., ACCNX		at Wake Forest						LJVM Coliseum; Winston-Salem, NC
February 11, 2027; 7:00 p.m., ACCNX		at NC State						Reynolds Coliseum; Raleigh, NC
February 14, 2027; 12:00 p.m., ACCNX		Clemson						Conte Forum; Chestnut Hill, MA
February 18, 2027; 6:00 p.m., ACCNX		Syracuse						Conte Forum; Chestnut Hill, MA
February 21, 2027; 2:00 p.m., ACCNX		Notre Dame						Conte Forum; Chestnut Hill, MA
February 25, 2027; 9:00 p.m., ACCNX		at California						Haas Pavilion; Berkeley, CA
February 28, 2027; 5:00 p.m., ACCNX		at Stanford						Maples Pavilion; Stanford, CA
*Non-conference game. ^{#}Rankings from AP Poll. (#) Tournament seedings in parentheses. All times are in Eastern.
