= 2026–27 Vermont Catamounts women's basketball team =

American college basketball season

2026–27 Vermont Catamounts women's basketball
- Conference: America East Conference
- Record: 4–2 (0–0 AmEast)
- Head coach: Maureen Magarity (1st season)
- Assistant coaches: Ryan Weise; Lauren Hammersley; Hayley Moore; Jackie Fetsko
- Home arena: Patrick Gym

2026–27 America East Conference women's basketball standings
	Conf.				Overall
Team	W		L	PCT	W		L	PCT
Bryant	0	–	0	–	5	–	0	1.000
NJIT	0	–	0	–	5	–	1	.833
Maine	0	–	0	–	4	–	1	.800
Albany	0	–	0	–	4	–	2	.667
New Hampshire	0	–	0	–	4	–	2	.667
UMBC	0	–	0	–	4	–	2	.667
Vermont	0	–	0	–	4	–	2	.667
Binghamton	0	–	0	–	3	–	3	.500
UMass Lowell	0	–	0	–	2	–	4	.333
† 2027 America East tournament winner As of November 20, 2026

The 2026–27 Vermont Catamounts women's basketball team will represent the University of Vermont during the 2026–27 NCAA Division I women's basketball season. The Catamounts, led by first-year head coach Maureen Magarity, will play their home games at the Patrick Gym in Burlington, Vermont and compete as a member of the America East Conference.

== Previous season ==
The Catamounts finished the 2025–26 season 27–8 overall and 13–3 in America East play, finishing as regular season champions. As the top seed and defending champions of the America East tournament they defeated No. 8 Albany and No. 4 UMBC in double overtime to advance to the championship game once again, where they defeated No. 2 Maine 61–43 to capture second consecutive and third America East title in four seasons, along with the automatic bid to the NCAA tournament.

In the tournament, the Catamounts were seeded No. 14 in the Fort Worth #3 Regional. They lost in the first round 52–72 to No. 3 Louisville to end their season.

On April 11, 2026, head coach Alisa Kresge left the program after seven seasons in order to take the head coaching job at Richmond. Two days later on April 13, Maureen Magarity, the wife of longtime Vermont men's basketball head coach John Becker, was named as the program's new head coach. Magarity most recently served as the head coach at Holy Cross until 2024, when she stepped down due to family reasons.

== Offseason ==
=== Departures ===
Vermont departures
Name	Number	Pos.	Height	Year	Hometown	Reason for departure
Annemarie Batista	11	Forward	6'1"	(redshirt) Senior	Tucson, AZ	Graduated
Keira Hanson	12	Guard	5'8"	Senior	Issaquah, WA	Graduated, transferred to DePaul
Devon Yarde	23	Guard	5'6"	Sophomore	Bluffton, SC	Transferred to Tampa (D-II)
Jadyn Weltz	24	Guard	5'7"	(redshirt) Senior	Timmins, Ontario	Graduated
Nikola Priede	25	Center	6'2"	Senior	Riga, Latvia	Graduated

=== Incoming transfers ===
Vermont incoming transfers
Name	Number	Pos.	Height	Year	Hometown	Previous school
Meja Jaegerskog	9	Forward	6'2"	Junior	Stockholm, Sweden	Saint Joseph's
Arantxa Portales	16	Forward	6'2"	Senior	Zaragoza, Spain	Delaware

=== Recruiting class ===
There was no 2026 recruiting class.

== Preseason ==
On September 28, 2026, the America East Conference released its preseason poll. Vermont was picked to finish third in the conference.

=== Preseason rankings ===
America East Preseason Poll
Place	Team	Votes
1	Binghamton	60 (6)
2	UMBC	57 (2)
3	Vermont	48 (1)
4	Maine	41
5	Bryant	40
6	NJIT	29
7	Albany	25
8	New Hampshire	16
9	UMass Lowell	8
(#) first-place votes

=== Preseason All-America East Team ===
Preseason All-America East Team
Player	Year	Position
Malia Lenz	Senior	Guard

== Roster ==
2026–27 Vermont Catamounts women's basketball team
Players
Coaches

Pos.	#	Name	Height	Year	Previous school	Hometown
G	0	Malia Lenz	5 ft 10 in (1.78 m)	Sr	Abbotsford Senior Secondary School	Chilliwack, British Columbia
G	2	Maren Maxon	5 ft 8 in (1.73 m)	So	Wells High School	Wells, ME
G	3	Emma Haan	5 ft 7 in (1.7 m)	Jr	Zionsville Community High School	Zionsville, IN
F	4	Madison Hall	6 ft 1 in (1.85 m)	So	Good Counsel High School	Crofton, MD
G	5	Neta Mayshar	5 ft 6 in (1.68 m)	Fr	Hapoel Lev Jerusalem	Jerusalem, Israel
F	9	Meja Jaegerskog	6 ft 2 in (1.88 m)	Jr	Luleå gymnasieskola Saint Joseph's	Stockholm, Sweden
G	10	Lia Hanson	5 ft 10 in (1.78 m)	So	Issaquah High School	Bellevue, WA
G	11	Maisie Keyes	5 ft 10 in (1.78 m)	Fr	Manchester Giants	Manchester, England
G	14	Catherine Gilwee	5 ft 8 in (1.73 m)	GS	Champlain Valley Union High School	Shelburne, VT
F	15	Piper Risdon	6 ft 0 in (1.83 m)	Jr	Lowell High School	Lowell, MI
F	16	Arantxa Portales	6 ft 2 in (1.88 m)	Sr	Colegio Romareda; Delaware	Zaragoza, Spain
G	22	Sienna Papanastasiou-Davis	5 ft 8 in (1.73 m)	Fr	J. Addison School	Richmond Hill, Ontario
G	24	Jacklynn Hosier	5 ft 8 in (1.73 m)	So	Alexandria High School	Alexandria, IN
F	33	Savanna Creal	6 ft 0 in (1.83 m)	RS So	Hamilton Chandler High School	Chandler, AZ

Head coach

- Maureen Magarity (Marist)

Assistant coach(es)

- Ryan Weise (LIU)
- Lauren Hammersley (Assumption)
- Hayley Moore (Binghamton)
- Jackie Fetsko (Lock Haven)

Legend

- (C) Team captain
- (S) Suspended
- (I) Ineligible
- (W) Walk-on
- Injured
- Current redshirt

Roster
Last update: September 15, 2026

== Schedule and results ==
Date time, TV	Rank^{#}	Opponent^{#}	Result	Record	High points	High rebounds	High assists	Site (attendance) city, state
Exhibition
October 28, 2026*; 5:00 p.m.		Saint Michael's						Patrick Gym; Burlington, VT
Non-conference regular season
November 2, 2026*; 6:00 p.m.		Keene State	W 96−37	1−0	20 – Papanastasiou-Thomas	7 – Haan	9 – Hosier	Patrick Gym (880); Burlington, VT
November 5, 2026*; 6:00 p.m.		Quinnipiac; AE–Metro Challenge						Patrick Gym; Burlington, VT
November 8, 2026*; 2:00 p.m.		at Fairfield; AE–Metro Challenge						Leo D. Mahoney Arena; Fairfield, CT
November 11, 2026*; 6:00 p.m.		Oregon						Patrick Gym; Burlington, VT
November 15, 2026*; 2:00 p.m.		Lehigh						Patrick Gym; Burlington, VT
November 19, 2026*; 6:00 p.m.		High Point						Patrick Gym; Burlington, VT
November 22, 2026*; 2:00 p.m.		Central Connecticut						Patrick Gym; Burlington, VT
November 25, 2026*; TBA		vs. Texas Southern; Puerto Rico Clasico						TBA; TBA
November 27, 2026*; TBA		vs. George Mason; Puerto Rico Clasico						TBA; TBA
December 2, 2026*; 6:00 p.m.		Stony Brook						Patrick Gym; Burlington, VT
December 8, 2026*; 6:00 p.m.		Scranton						Patrick Gym; Burlington, VT
December 13, 2026*; 12:00 p.m.		Drexel						Patrick Gym; Burlington, VT
December 19, 2026*; TBA		at Boston University						Case Gym; Boston, MA
December 28, 2026*; TBA		at Dartmouth						Leede Arena; Hanover, NH
America East regular season
December 31, 2026; TBA		at Maine						Memorial Gymnasium; Orono, ME
January 2, 2027; 2:00 p.m.		Binghamton						Patrick Gym; Burlington, VT
January 7, 2027; TBA		at UMass Lowell						Kennedy Family Athletic Complex; Lowell, MA
January 14, 2027; 11:00 a.m.		New Hampshire						Patrick Gym; Burlington, VT
January 16, 2027; TBA		at Bryant						Chace Athletic Center; Smithfield, RI
January 21, 2027; 6:00 p.m.		UMBC						Patrick Gym; Burlington, VT
January 23, 2027; 2:00 p.m.		NJIT						Patrick Gym; Burlington, VT
January 28, 2027; 6:00 p.m.		Maine						Patrick Gym; Burlington, VT
January 30, 2027; TBA		at Albany						Broadview Center; Albany, NY
February 4, 2027; TBA		at New Hampshire						Lundholm Gymnasium; Durham, NH
February 6, 2027; 6:00 p.m.		Bryant						Patrick Gym; Burlington, VT
February 11, 2027; TBA		at Binghamton						Dr. Bai Lee Court; Vestal, NY
February 13, 2027; 2:00 p.m.		Albany						Patrick Gym; Burlington, VT
February 18, 2027; TBA		at UMBC						Chesapeake Employers Insurance Arena; Baltimore, MD
February 20, 2027; TBA		at NJIT						Wellness and Events Center; Newark, NJ
February 27, 2027; 2:00 p.m.		UMass Lowell						Patrick Gym; Burlington, VT
*Non-conference game. ^{#}Rankings from AP Poll. (#) Tournament seedings in parentheses. All times are in Eastern.
