= 2026–27 Bryant Bulldogs women's basketball team =

American college basketball season

2026–27 Bryant Bulldogs women's basketball
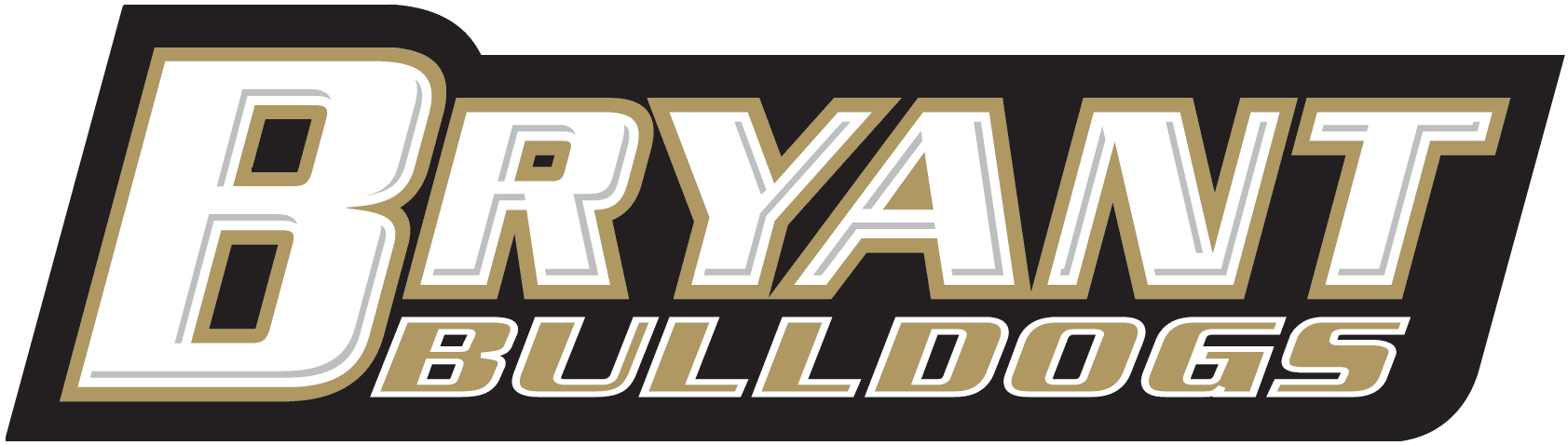
- Conference: America East Conference
- Record: 6–0 (0–0 AmEast)
- Head coach: Lynne-Ann Kokoski (4th season)
- Assistant coaches: Michael Murphy; Abby Vampatella; Deshon Gaither; Reilly Howard
- Home arena: Chace Athletic Center

2026–27 America East Conference women's basketball standings
	Conf.				Overall
Team	W		L	PCT	W		L	PCT
Bryant	0	–	0	–	5	–	0	1.000
NJIT	0	–	0	–	5	–	1	.833
Maine	0	–	0	–	4	–	1	.800
Albany	0	–	0	–	4	–	2	.667
New Hampshire	0	–	0	–	4	–	2	.667
UMBC	0	–	0	–	4	–	2	.667
Vermont	0	–	0	–	4	–	2	.667
Binghamton	0	–	0	–	3	–	3	.500
UMass Lowell	0	–	0	–	2	–	4	.333
† 2027 America East tournament winner As of November 22, 2026

The 2026–27 Bryant Bulldogs women's basketball team currently represents Bryant University during the 2026–27 NCAA Division I women's basketball season. The Bulldogs, led by fourth-year head coach Lynne-Ann Kokoski, play their home games at the Chace Athletic Center in Smithfield, Rhode Island, and compete as a member of the America East Conference.

== Previous season ==
The Bulldogs finished the 2025–26 season 18–12 overall and 8–8 in America East play, finishing sixth in the conference. As the No. 3 seed in the America East tournament, they lost 44–45 at the buzzer in the quarterfinals to No. 3 Binghamton to end their season.

== Offseason ==
=== Departures ===
Bryant departures
Name	Number	Pos.	Height	Year	Hometown	Reason for departure
Mimi Rubino	5	Guard	5'7"	Graduate Student	Pequannock, NJ	Graduated
Abbey Lindsey	9	Guard	5'8"	Junior	Staten Island, NY	Transferred to Staten Island (D-II)
Rose Nelson	10	Forward	6'1"	Senior	Wallacia, Australia	Graduated
Azanah Campbell	15	Guard	5'9"	Freshman	Williamstown, NJ	Transferred to Harcum College (NJCAA)
Madara Liepniece	19	Guard	5'7"	Junior	Riga, Latvia	Transferred to Lake Superior State (D-II)
Giselle Davis	23	Forward	6'0"	Freshman	Bayonne, NJ	Transferred to Caldwell (D-II)
Maranda Nyborg	24	Forward	6'3"	Graduate Student	Bethel, CT	Graduated

=== Incoming transfers ===
Bryant incoming transfers
Name	Number	Pos.	Height	Year	Hometown	Previous school
Genevieve Wedemeyer	8	Guard	5'8"	Senior	Hamburg, Germany	Siena
Ndeye Astou Ndiaye	10	Forward	6'1"	Sophomore	Thies, Senegal	FIU
Ndate Ndiaye	14	Forward	5'10"	Junior	Thies, Senegal	FIU
Cameron McNamara	40	Forward	6'2"	Senior	Fort Pierce, FL	Highland CC (NJCAA)

=== Recruiting class ===
There was no 2026 recruiting class.

== Preseason ==
On September 28, 2026, the America East Conference released its preseason poll. Bryant was picked to finish fifth in the conference.

=== Preseason rankings ===
America East Preseason Poll
Place	Team	Votes
1	Binghamton	60 (6)
2	UMBC	57 (2)
3	Vermont	48 (1)
4	Maine	41
5	Bryant	40
6	NJIT	29
7	Albany	25
8	New Hampshire	16
9	UMass Lowell	8
(#) first-place votes

=== Preseason All-America East Team ===
Preseason All-America East Team
Player	Year	Position
Mia Mancini	Senior	Guard
Nia Scott	Senior	Forward

== Roster ==
2026–27 Bryant Bulldogs women's basketball team
Players
Coaches

Pos.	#	Name	Height	Year	Previous school	Hometown
G	1	Jaida Guerra	5 ft 6 in (1.68 m)	So	José Martí STEM Academy	Union City, NJ
G	2	Mia Mancini	5 ft 6 in (1.68 m)	Sr	Wheeler School	Mansfield, MA
G	5	Aliyah Brame	5 ft 8 in (1.73 m)	Fr	Bethlehem Catholic High School	Bethlehem, PA
G	8	Genevieve Wedemeyer	5 ft 8 in (1.73 m)	Sr	Siena	Hamburg, Germany
F	10	Ndeye Astou Ndiaye	6 ft 1 in (1.85 m)	So	The Academy of Central Florida; FIU	Thies, Senegal
G	11	Olivia Fernandez	5 ft 9 in (1.75 m)	Jr	Harrison High School	Harrison, NY
G	12	Natalie Chisi	5 ft 9 in (1.75 m)	Fr	La Salle College	Perth, Australia
G	14	Ndate Ndiaye	5 ft 10 in (1.78 m)	Jr	Greenforest Christian Academy; FIU	Thies, Senegal
G	21	Sammie Sullivan	5 ft 10 in (1.78 m)	Fr	Londonderry High School	Londonderry, NH
G	22	Izzy Adams	5 ft 6 in (1.68 m)	So	Dexter Southfield School	Walpole, MA
G	32	Martina Boba	5 ft 8 in (1.73 m)	Sr	Institut Argentona	Argentona, Spain
F	40	Cameron McNamara	6 ft 2 in (1.88 m)	Sr	Busche Academy; Highland CC	Fort Pierce, FL
F	55	Nia Scott	6 ft 1 in (1.85 m)	Sr	Shawnee High School	Medford Lakes, NJ

Head coach

- Lynne-Ann Kokoski (Bryant)

Assistant coach(es)

- Michael Murphy (Cardinal Stritch)
- Abby Vampatella (Gordon)
- Deshon Gaither (Ashford)
- Reilly Howard (Florida State)

Legend

- (C) Team captain
- (S) Suspended
- (I) Ineligible
- (W) Walk-on
- Injured
- Current redshirt

Roster
Last update: September 26, 2026

== Schedule and results ==
Date time, TV	Rank^{#}	Opponent^{#}	Result	Record	High points	High rebounds	High assists	Site (attendance) city, state
Non-conference regular season
November 2, 2026*; 5:00 p.m., ESPN+		MIT	W 75−25	1−0	14 – Scott	11 – Nda. Ndiaye	6 – Adams	Chace Athletic Center (316); Smithfield, RI
November 5, 2026*; 6:00 p.m., ESPN+		Marist; AE–Metro Challenge	W 65–63	2–0	16 – McNamara	7 – Mancini	6 – Mancini	Chace Athletic Center (313); Smithfield, RI
November 8, 2026*; 2:00 p.m., ESPN+		at Manhattan; AE–Metro Challenge	W 63–46	3–0	15 – Mancini	11 – Scott	4 – Mancini	Draddy Gymnasium (246); Riverdale, NY
November 11, 2026*; 7:00 p.m., ESPN+		at Providence	W 53–47	4–0	19 – Mancini	7 – Tied	5 – Mancini	Alumni Hall (830); Providence, RI
November 16, 2026*; 6:00 p.m., ESPN+		at Holy Cross	W 62–49	5–0	16 – Scott	13 – Scott	7 – Mancini	Hart Center Arena (432); Worcester, MA
November 21, 2026*; 1:00 p.m., FloCollege		at Northeastern	W 58–55	6–0	25 – Mancini	11 – Scott	4 – Mancini	Cabot Center (174); Boston, MA
November 24, 2026*; 6:00 p.m.		Stonehill						Chace Athletic Center; Smithfield, RI
November 29, 2026*; 2:00 p.m.		Boston University						Chace Athletic Center; Smithfield, RI
November 30, 2026*; 6:00 p.m.		American International						Chace Athletic Center; Smithfield, RI
December 8, 2026*; 6:00 p.m.		Merrimack						Chace Athletic Center; Smithfield, RI
December 10, 2026*; 11:00 a.m.		at Boston College						Conte Forum; Chestnut Hill, MA
December 13, 2026*; TBA		at Central Connecticut						Detrick Gymnasium; New Britain, CT
December 21, 2026*; 6:00 p.m.		Brown						Chace Athletic Center; Smithfield, RI
America East regular season
December 31, 2026; TBA		at New Hampshire						Lundholm Gymnasium; Durham, NC
January 2, 2027; TBA		at Maine						Memorial Gymnasium; Orono, ME
January 7, 2027; TBA		Albany						Chace Athletic Center; Smithfield, RI
January 9, 2027; TBA		UMass Lowell						Chace Athletic Center; Smithfield, RI
January 14, 2027; 12:00 p.m.		at UMBC						Chesapeake Employers Insurance Arena; Baltimore, MD
January 16, 2027; TBA		Vermont						Chace Athletic Center; Smithfield, RI
January 21, 2027; TBA		at NJIT						Wellness and Events Center; Newark, NJ
January 28, 2027; TBA		New Hampshire						Chace Athletic Center; Smithfield, RI
January 30, 2027; TBA		at Binghamton						Dr. Bai Lee Court; Vestal, NY
February 4, 2027; TBA		UMBC						Chace Athletic Center; Smithfield, RI
February 6, 2027; TBA		at Vermont						Patrick Gym; Burlington, VT
February 11, 2027; TBA		at Albany						Broadview Center; Albany, NY
February 18, 2027; TBA		Maine						Chace Athletic Center; Smithfield, RI
February 20, 2027; TBA		Binghamton						Chace Athletic Center; Smithfield, RI
February 25, 2027; TBA		at UMass Lowell						Kennedy Family Athletic Complex; Lowell, MA
February 27, 2027; TBA		NJIT						Chace Athletic Center; Smithfield, RI
*Non-conference game. ^{#}Rankings from AP Poll. (#) Tournament seedings in parentheses. All times are in Eastern.
