= 2026–27 Binghamton Bearcats women's basketball team =

American college basketball season

2026–27 Binghamton Bearcats women's basketball
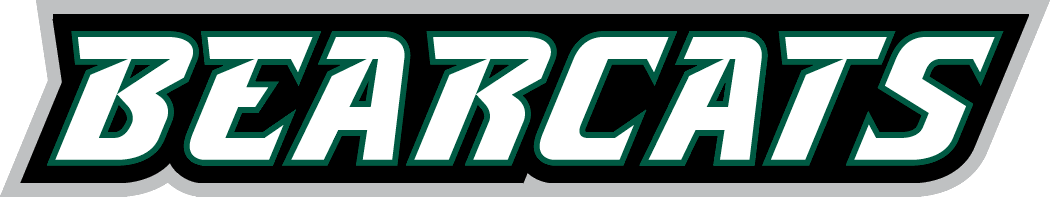
- Conference: America East Conference
- Record: 4–3 (0–0 AmEast)
- Head coach: Mary Grimes (3rd season)
- Assistant coaches: Evelyn Thompson; Jocelin Wright
- Home arena: Visions Veterans Memorial Arena; Binghamton University Events Center

2026–27 America East Conference women's basketball standings
	Conf.				Overall
Team	W		L	PCT	W		L	PCT
Bryant	0	–	0	–	5	–	0	1.000
NJIT	0	–	0	–	5	–	1	.833
Maine	0	–	0	–	4	–	1	.800
Albany	0	–	0	–	4	–	2	.667
New Hampshire	0	–	0	–	4	–	2	.667
UMBC	0	–	0	–	4	–	2	.667
Vermont	0	–	0	–	4	–	2	.667
Binghamton	0	–	0	–	3	–	3	.500
UMass Lowell	0	–	0	–	2	–	4	.333
† 2027 America East tournament winner As of November 22, 2026

The 2026–27 Binghamton Bearcats women's basketball team currently represents Binghamton University during the 2026–27 NCAA Division I women's basketball season. The Bearcats, led by third-year head coach Mary Grimes, split their home games (Note: Due to ongoing renovations to the Events Center, scheduled to be completed in late 2026.) between the Visions Veterans Memorial Arena in Binghamton, New York and Dr. Bai Lee Court in Vestal, New York, and compete as a member of the America East Conference.

== Previous season ==
The Bearcats finished the 2025–26 season 20–12 overall and 10–6 in America East play, finishing third in the conference. As the No. 3 seed in the America East tournament, they defeated No. 6 Bryant 45–44 on a game-winning shot by junior guard Bella Pucci. They moved onto the semifinals, where they lost to No. 2 Maine 56–60.

Following the America East tournament, the Bearcats earned and accepted an at-large bid to the WNIT, making it their first appearance in a postseason tournament since the 2018 WBI. They routed Mercyhurst 81–60 in Round 1, before being eliminated in Round 2 in a 61–70 loss to La Salle to end their season.

== Offseason ==
=== Departures ===
Binghamton departures
Name	Num.	Pos.	Height	Year	Hometown	Reason for departure
Kaia Goode	3	Guard	5'4"	Senior	Rochester, NY	Graduated
Meghan Casey	5	Guard	5'9"	Senior	White Plains, NY	Graduated
Leah Middleton	22	Guard	5'11"	Junior	Auburn, NY	Transferred to Northern Illinois

=== Incoming transfers ===
Binghamton incoming transfers
Name	Num.	Pos.	Height	Year	Hometown	Previous school
Emma Hakonardottir	12	Guard	5'11"	Junior	Þorlákshöfn, Iceland	Albany

=== Recruiting class ===
There was no 2026 recruiting class.

== Preseason ==
On September 28, 2026, the America East Conference released its preseason poll. Binghamton was picked to finish first in the conference.

=== Preseason rankings ===
America East Preseason Poll
Place	Team	Votes
1	Binghamton	60 (6)
2	UMBC	57 (2)
3	Vermont	48 (1)
4	Maine	41
5	Bryant	40
6	NJIT	29
7	Albany	25
8	New Hampshire	16
9	UMass Lowell	8
(#) first-place votes

=== Preseason All-America East Team ===
Preseason All-America East Team
Player	Year	Position
Kendall Bennett	Senior	Guard
Bella Pucci	Senior	Guard

== Roster ==
2026–27 Binghamton Bearcats women's basketball team
Players
Coaches

Pos.	#	Name	Height	Year	Previous school	Hometown
G	0	Yanniah Boyd	5 ft 11 in (1.8 m)	Sr	Riverdale Baptist School	Frederick, MD
G	1	Klarissa Goode	5 ft 5 in (1.65 m)	So	Bishop Kearney High School	Rochester, NY
G	2	Kameryn Dorsey	5 ft 6 in (1.68 m)	Jr	Saint Frances Academy; Saint Francis (PA)	Baltimore, MD
F	4	Kendall Bennett	6 ft 2 in (1.88 m)	Sr	Germantown Academy	Philadelphia, PA
F	7	Sophie Elzina René	6 ft 2 in (1.88 m)	Fr	Champlain College Saint-Lambert	Brossard, Quebec
G	9	Cam Gaudreau	5 ft 7 in (1.7 m)	Fr	Champlain College Saint-Lambert	Gatineau, Quebec
G	11	Carletta Bennett	5 ft 8 in (1.73 m)	So	King's Christian Collegiate	Brampton, Ontario
G	12	Emma Hakonardottir	5 ft 11 in (1.8 m)	Jr	Fjölbrautarskóli Suðurlands; Albany	Þorlákshöfn, Iceland
G	20	Bella Pucci	5 ft 9 in (1.75 m)	Sr	Fairport High School	Rochester, NY
F	21	Kaitlyn McMillan	6 ft 1 in (1.85 m)	So	Lo-Ellen Park Secondary School	Waterloo, Ontario
G	23	Ashley Redd	5 ft 10 in (1.78 m)	So	Sierra Canyon School	Porter Ranch, CA
C	32	Abby Misier	6 ft 5 in (1.96 m)	Jr	Hightstown High School	Hightstown, NJ
G	33	Leah Fowler	6 ft 0 in (1.83 m)	So	Barker College	Sydney, Australia
F	55	Daysha Salgado	6 ft 2 in (1.88 m)	So	James Monroe High School	Stafford, VA

Head coach

- Mary Grimes (Siena)

Assistant coach(es)

- Evelyn Thompson (Auburn)
- Jocelin Wright (Nyack)

Legend

- (C) Team captain
- (S) Suspended
- (I) Ineligible
- (W) Walk-on
- Injured
- Current redshirt

Roster
Last update: September 15, 2026

== Schedule and results ==
Date time, TV	Rank^{#}	Opponent^{#}	Result	Record	High points	High rebounds	High assists	Site (attendance) city, state
Non-conference regular season
November 2, 2026*; 6:00 p.m., FloCollege		at Monmouth	L 40–63	0–1	15 – Boyd	11 – K. Bennett	2 – Gaudreau	OceanFirst Bank Center (428); West Long Branch, NJ
November 6, 2026*; 7:00 p.m., ESPN+		at Fairfield; AE–Metro Challenge	L 63–90	0–2	23 – Pucci	5 – Boyd	5 – Boyd	Leo D. Mahoney Arena (846); Fairfield, CT
November 8, 2026*; 4:00 p.m., ESPN+		at Siena; AE–Metro Challenge	W 79–73	1–2	27 – K. Bennett	13 – K. Bennett	5 – Pucci	MVP Arena (4,393); Albany, NY
November 11, 2026*; 6:00 p.m., ESPN+		at Colgate	W 59–36	2–2	21 – K. Bennett	8 – K. Bennett	6 – Dorsey	Cotterell Court (305); Hamilton, NY
November 14, 2026*; 1:30 p.m., ESPN+		at St. Bonaventure	W 67–56	3–2	19 – Pucci	7 – Pucci	6 – Pucci	Reilly Center (623); St. Bonaventure, NY
November 18, 2026*; 7:00 p.m., ESPN+		at South Florida	L 61–72	3–3	19 – Pucci	8 – K. Bennett	3 – Boyd	Yuengling Center (1,790); Tampa, FL
November 21, 2026*; 1:00 p.m., ESPN+		Daemen	W 81–44	4–3	25 – Pucci	12 – K. Bennett	– Tied	Visions Veterans Memorial Arena; Binghamton, NY
November 23, 2026*; 7:00 p.m.		at Marist						McCann Arena; Poughkeepsie, NY
November 26, 2026*; 2:00 p.m.		vs. UTSA; Puerto Rico Clasico						TBA; San Juan, PR
November 27, 2026*; 12:30 p.m.		vs. Providence; Puerto Rico Clasico						TBA; San Juan, PR
December 2, 2026*; 3:00 p.m.		at Army						Christl Arena; West Point, NY
December 5, 2026*; 1:00 p.m.		UMass						Visions Veterans Memorial Arena; Binghamton, NY
December 8, 2026*; TBA		at Temple						Liacouras Center; Philadelphia, PA
December 19, 2026*; TBA		at Penn						The Palestra; Philadelphia, PA
December 21, 2026*; 11:00 a.m.		at Saint Francis (PA)						DeGol Arena; Loretto, PA
America East regular season
December 31, 2026; 1:00 p.m.		UMBC						Dr. Bai Lee Court; Vestal, NY
January 2, 2027; 2:00 p.m.		at Vermont						Patrick Gym; Burlington, VT
January 9, 2027; TBA		at Albany						Broadview Center; Albany, NY
January 14, 2027; 11:00 a.m.		UMass Lowell						Dr. Bai Lee Court; Vestal, NY
January 16, 2027; 2:00 p.m.		NJIT						Dr. Bai Lee Court; Vestal, NY
January 21, 2027; 6:00 p.m.		at Maine						Memorial Gymnasium; Orono, ME
January 23, 2027; 1:00 p.m.		at New Hampshire						Lundholm Gymnasium; Durham, NH
January 28, 2027; 6:00 p.m.		at UMBC						Chesapeake Employers Insurance Arena; Baltimore, MD
January 30, 2027; 2:00 p.m.		Bryant						Dr. Bai Lee Court; Vestal, NY
February 6, 2027; 3:00 p.m.		at NJIT						Wellness and Events Center; Newark, NJ
February 11, 2027; 6:07 p.m.		Vermont						Dr. Bai Lee Court; Vestal, NY
February 13, 2027; 1:00 p.m.		at UMass Lowell						Kennedy Family Athletic Complex; Lowell, MA
February 18, 2027; 6:07 p.m.		Albany						Dr. Bai Lee Court; Vestal, NY
February 20, 2027; 2:00 p.m.		at Bryant						Chace Athletic Center; Smithfield, RI
February 25, 2027; 6:07 p.m.		Maine						Dr. Bai Lee Court; Vestal, NY
February 27, 2027; 2:00 p.m.		New Hampshire						Dr. Bai Lee Court; Vestal, NY
*Non-conference game. ^{#}Rankings from AP Poll. (#) Tournament seedings in parentheses. All times are in Eastern.
