= 2026–27 Maine Black Bears women's basketball team =

American college basketball season

2026–27 Maine Black Bears women's basketball
- Conference: America East Conference
- Record: 4–1 (0–0 AmEast)
- Head coach: Amy Vachon (10th season)
- Associate head coach: Courtney England
- Assistant coaches: Tom Biskup; Tanesha Sutton
- Home arena: Memorial Gymnasium

2026–27 America East Conference women's basketball standings
	Conf.				Overall
Team	W		L	PCT	W		L	PCT
Bryant	0	–	0	–	5	–	0	1.000
NJIT	0	–	0	–	5	–	1	.833
Maine	0	–	0	–	4	–	1	.800
Albany	0	–	0	–	4	–	2	.667
New Hampshire	0	–	0	–	4	–	2	.667
UMBC	0	–	0	–	4	–	2	.667
Vermont	0	–	0	–	4	–	2	.667
Binghamton	0	–	0	–	3	–	3	.500
UMass Lowell	0	–	0	–	2	–	4	.333
† 2027 America East tournament winner As of November 21, 2026

The 2026–27 Maine Black Bears women's basketball team will represent the University of Maine during the 2026–27 NCAA Division I women's basketball season. The Black Bears, led by tenth-year head coach Amy Vachon, will play their home games at Memorial Gymnasium in Orono, Maine and compete as a member of the America East Conference. Maine will take part in the America East-Metro Conference challenge.

== Previous season ==
The Black Bears finished the 2025–26 season 19–13 overall and 12–4 in America East play, finishing second in the conference. As the No. 2 seed in the America East tournament, they defeated No. 7 New Hampshire 77–58 in the quarterfinals before narrowly defeating No. 3 Binghamton 60–56 to advance to their second championship game in three seasons, losing to defending champions and top-seeded Vermont 43–61 to end their season.

== Offseason ==
=== Departures ===
Maine departures
Name	Number	Pos.	Height	Year	Hometown	Reason for departure
Amiyah Donaldson	5	Guard	5'7"	(redshirt) Senior	Cleveland, OH	Graduated, transferred to Hampton
Asta Blauenfeldt	6	Guard	5'6"	Senior	Kongens Lyngby, Denmark	Graduated
Sarah Talon	12	Guard	5'10"	Senior	Windham, ME	Graduated
Adrianna Smith	33	Forward	6'0"	(redshirt) Senior	Reston, VA	Graduated

=== Incoming transfers ===
Maine incoming transfers
Name	Number	Pos.	Height	Year	Hometown	Previous school
Taylor Schwab	0	Guard	5'9"	Junior	Gig Harbor, WA	Arizona Christian (NAIA)

=== Recruiting class ===
There was no 2026 recruiting class.

== Preseason ==
On September 28, 2026, the America East Conference released its preseason poll. Maine was picked to finish fourth in the conference.

=== Preseason rankings ===
America East Preseason Poll
Place	Team	Votes
1	Binghamton	60 (6)
2	UMBC	57 (2)
3	Vermont	48 (1)
4	Maine	41
5	Bryant	40
6	NJIT	29
7	Albany	25
8	New Hampshire	16
9	UMass Lowell	8
(#) first-place votes

=== Preseason All-America East Team ===
No players were selected for the Preseason All-America East Team.

== Roster ==
2026–27 Maine Black Bears women's basketball team
Players
Coaches

Pos.	#	Name	Height	Year	Previous school	Hometown
G	0	Taylor Schwab	5 ft 9 in (1.75 m)	Jr	Gig Harbor High School; Arizona Christian	Gig Harbor, WA
G	1	Ayla Corrigale	5 ft 7 in (1.7 m)	Fr	Orangeville District Secondary School	Orangeville, Ontario
G	2	Emmie Streams-Stevens	5 ft 4 in (1.63 m)	Sr	Bangor High School	Veazie, ME
G	3	Izzy Allen	5 ft 11 in (1.8 m)	Jr	Central High School	Corinth, ME
C	8	Lizzy Gruber	6 ft 4 in (1.93 m)	Sr	Gardiner High School; Saint Joseph's	Gardiner, ME
G	10	Ava Sewall	5 ft 9 in (1.75 m)	Fr	Potomac High School	Annandale, VA
G	12	Aina Real	5 ft 9 in (1.75 m)	Fr	C.D. Alcazar	Ciutadella de Menorca, Spain
C	15	Abby Price	6 ft 4 in (1.93 m)	So	Grandview Preparatory School	Boca Raton, FL
F	17	Zeina Haleem	6 ft 3 in (1.91 m)	Fr	Brighton British School	Cairo, Egypt
G	23	Maddie Fitzpatrick	5 ft 11 in (1.8 m)	RS So	Cheverus High School	Cumberland, ME
F	31	Bailey Breen	6 ft 3 in (1.91 m)	So	Montverde Academy	South Thomaston, ME
G	32	Olivia Alvarez	5 ft 8 in (1.73 m)	So	IES Carmen Conde	Madrid, Spain
G/F	34	Mackenzie Mori	5 ft 11 in (1.8 m)	So	Hamden Hall Country Day School	Wethersfield, CT
G	35	Lala Woods	5 ft 8 in (1.73 m)	So	Wheeling Park High School	Wheeling, WV
F	45	Kaliyah Sain	6 ft 0 in (1.83 m)	Sr	John F. Kennedy High School; Kirkwood CC	Cedar Rapids, IA

Head coach

- Amy Vachon (Maine)

Assistant coach(es)

- Courtney England (Maine)
- Tom Biskup (Maine)
- Tanesha Sutton (Maine)

Legend

- (C) Team captain
- (S) Suspended
- (I) Ineligible
- (W) Walk-on
- Injured
- Current redshirt

Roster
Last update: September 16, 2026

== Schedule and results ==
Date time, TV	Rank^{#}	Opponent^{#}	Result	Record	High points	High rebounds	High assists	Site (attendance) city, state
Non-conference regular season
November 5, 2026*; 6:00 p.m., ESPN+		Siena; AE–Metro Challenge	W 70–68	1–0	18 – Gruber	17 – Fitzpatrick	3 – Tied	Memorial Gymnasium (1,063); Orono, ME
November 8, 2026*; 1:00 p.m., ESPN+		at Merrimack; AE–Metro Challenge	W 87–62	2–0	19 – Fitzpatrick	9 – Fitzpatrick	5 – Alvarez	Lawler Arena (373); North Andover, MA
November 13, 2026*; 7:00 p.m., ESPN+		Oregon	L 72–79	2–1	21 – Woods	9 – Fitzpatrick	6 – Gruber	Memorial Gymnasium (1,507); Orono, ME
November 15, 2026*; 1:00 p.m., ESPN+		Brown	W 53–48	3−1	–	–	–	Memorial Gymnasium; Orono, ME
November 19, 2026*; 6:00 p.m., ESPN+		VCU	W 85–80 ^{OT}	4−1	–	–	–	Memorial Gymnasium; Orono, ME
November 22, 2026*; 11:30 a.m., NESN/ESPN+		Penn						Memorial Gymnasium; Orono, ME
November 27, 2026*; 4:45 p.m., BallerTV		vs. Kentucky; Daytona Beach Classic						Ocean Center; Daytona Beach, FL
November 28, 2026*; 11:00 a.m., BallerTV		vs. Tulane; Daytona Beach Classic						Ocean Center; Daytona Beach, FL
December 3, 2026*; TBA		at Michigan State						Breslin Center; East Lansing, MI
December 6, 2026*; 1:00 p.m.		Quinnipiac						Memorial Gymnasium; Orono, ME
December 9, 2026*; 6:00 p.m.		vs. Fairfield						Portland Expo Center; Portland, ME
December 13, 2026*; TBA		at Rhode Island						Ryan Center; Kingston, RI
December 21, 2026*; TBA		at George Washington						Charles E. Smith Center; Washington, D.C.
America East regular season
December 31, 2026; 1:00 p.m.		Vermont						Memorial Gymnasium; Orono, ME
January 2, 2027; 1:00 p.m.		Bryant						Memorial Gymnasium; Orono, ME
January 7, 2027; TBA		at UMBC						Chesapeake Employers Insurance Arena; Baltimore, MD
January 9, 2027; TBA		at NJIT						Wellness and Events Center; Newark, NJ
January 16, 2027; TBA		at UMass Lowell						Kennedy Family Athletic Complex; Lowell, MA
January 21, 2027; 6:00 p.m.		Binghamton						Memorial Gymnasium; Orono, ME
January 23, 2027; 1:00 p.m.		Albany						Memorial Gymnasium; Orono, ME
January 28, 2027; 6:00 p.m.		at Vermont						Patrick Gym; Burlington, VT
January 30, 2027; TBA		at New Hampshire						Lundholm Gymnasium; Durham, NH
February 4, 2027; 5:00 p.m.		UMass Lowell						Memorial Gymnasium; Orono, ME
February 11, 2027; 6:00 p.m.		UMBC						Memorial Gymnasium; Orono, ME
February 13, 2027; 1:00 p.m.		NJIT						Memorial Gymnasium; Orono, ME
February 18, 2027; TBA		at Bryant						Chace Athletic Center; Smithfield, RI
February 20, 2027; 1:00 p.m.		NJIT						Memorial Gymnasium; Orono, ME
February 25, 2027; TBA		at Binghamton						Dr. Bai Lee Court; Vestal, NY
February 27, 2027; TBA		at Albany						Broadview Center; Albany, NY
*Non-conference game. ^{#}Rankings from AP Poll. (#) Tournament seedings in parentheses. All times are in Eastern.
