= 2026–27 Towson Tigers women's basketball team =

American college basketball season

2026–27 Towson Tigers women's basketball

410 Invitational champions
- Conference: Coastal Athletic Association
- Record: 3–4 (0–0 CAA)
- Head coach: Laura Harper (5th season)
- Associate head coach: Eric Atkins
- Assistant coaches: Tony DiClemente; Zion Sanders; Lorie Khalil; Nick Boboshko
- Home arena: SECU Arena

2026–27 CAA women's basketball standings
	Conf.				Overall
Team	W		L	PCT	W		L	PCT
Stony Brook	0	–	0	–	4	–	0	1.000
Monmouth	0	–	0	–	4	–	1	.800
UNC Wilmington	0	–	0	–	3	–	1	.750
Charleston	0	–	0	–	3	–	2	.600
Elon	0	–	0	–	3	–	2	.600
William & Mary	0	–	0	–	3	–	2	.600
Hofstra	0	–	0	–	2	–	2	.500
Northeastern	0	–	0	–	2	–	2	.500
Towson	0	–	0	–	3	–	4	.429
Drexel	0	–	0	–	2	–	3	.400
North Carolina A&T	0	–	0	–	2	–	4	.333
Hampton	0	–	0	–	1	–	4	.200
Campbell	0	–	0	–	1	–	6	.143
† 2027 CAA tournament winner As of November 21, 2026

The 2026–27 Towson Tigers women's basketball team currently represents Towson University during the 2026–27 NCAA Division I women's basketball season. The Tigers, led by fifth-year head coach Laura Harper, play their home games at the SECU Arena in Towson, Maryland, and compete as a member of the Coastal Athletic Association.

== Previous season ==
The Tigers finished the 2025–26 season 17–14 overall and 10–8 in CAA play, finishing in a tie for seventh in the conference with Elon. As the No. 7 seed in the CAA tournament, they lost 71–72 in the second round to eventual tournament runners-up No. 10 Hofstra to end their season, after Hofstra player Emma Von Essen made a 3-pointer with 2.7 seconds remaining in the game.

== Offseason ==
=== Departures ===
Towson departures
Name	Num	Pos.	Height	Year	Hometown	Reason for departure
Semaya Turner	1	Forward	5'11"	Senior	Rockaway, NJ	Graduated
India Johnston	2	Guard	5'8"	Senior	Bear, DE	Graduated
Shariah Baynes	4	Guard	5'6"	Sophomore	Philadelphia, PA	Transferred to UMBC
Kayla Morris	5	Forward	6'2"	RS senior	Harlem, NY	Graduated
Hannah Dereje	7	Forward-Center	6'3"	Graduate Student	Burtonsville, MD	Graduated
Tilda Sjökvist	9	Guard	5'7"	Senior	Huskvarna, Sweden	Graduated
Jaymee Wadey	25	Forward-Center	6'2"	Freshman	Melbourne, Australia	Transferred to American
Aidan Langley	31	Forward	6'1"	Freshman	Coatesville, PA	Transferred to Loyola Maryland

=== Incoming transfers ===
Towson incoming transfers
Name	Num	Pos.	Height	Year	Hometown	Previous school
Ava Renninger	4	Guard	5'6"	Junior	Yardley, PA	Fairleigh Dickinson
Akeelah Lafleur	22	Forward	6'3"	Sophomore	Willingboro, NJ	Fairleigh Dickinson

=== Recruiting class ===
There was no recruiting class for the class of 2026.

== Preseason ==
On October 15, 2026, the CAA released its annual preseason coaches poll and awards. Towson was picked to finish fifth in the conference.

=== Preseason rankings ===
CAA Preseason Coaches Poll
Place	Team	Votes
1	Monmouth	144 (12)
2	Elon	116
3	Drexel	109
4	William & Mary	108 (1)
5	Towson	99
6	North Carolina A&T	89
7	Stony Brook	88
8	Charleston	71
9	Hofstra	56
10	Hampton	51
11	Northeastern	35
12	Campbell	30
13	UNC Wilmington	18
(#) first-place votes

=== Preseason All-CAA Teams ===
No players were named to the Preseason All-CAA First or Second Team.

=== CAA Preseason Honorable Mentions ===
CAA Preseason Honorable Mentions
Player	Year	Position
Ava Renninger	Junior	Guard

== Roster ==
2026–27 Towson Tigers women's basketball team
Players
Coaches

Pos.	#	Name	Height	Year	Previous school	Hometown
G	0	Masyn Marchbanks	5 ft 8 in (1.73 m)	GS	Hartselle High School; Samford	Hartselle, AL
G	3	Nadeya Regala	5 ft 9 in (1.75 m)	RS Fr	Elizabeth Seton High School	Waldorf, MD
G	4	Ava Renninger	5 ft 6 in (1.68 m)	Jr	Archbishop Wood High School; Fairleigh Dickinson	Yardley, PA
G	5	Eva Wilkerson	5 ft 10 in (1.78 m)	Fr	Sacred Heart Greenwich	Somers, NY
G	6	Viki Matulevicius	5 ft 8 in (1.73 m)	RS So	Montini Catholic High School; South Dakota	Willowbrook, IL
F	7	Diamond Watters	6 ft 1 in (1.85 m)	Fr	Mount Zion Christian Academy	Baltimore, MD
G	8	Jillian Watson	5 ft 7 in (1.7 m)	So	Northern Burlington High School	Chesterfield, NJ
G	11	Thalia Shepard	5 ft 9 in (1.75 m)	Sr	St. Andrew's School; Merrimack	Boston, MA
G	13	Zoli Khalil	6 ft 0 in (1.83 m)	Sr	Spotswood High School; VCU	Rockingham, VA
G	15	Asya Lara Barnes	6 ft 0 in (1.83 m)	So	DME Academy	Istanbul, Turkey
G	21	Sam Donovan	5 ft 9 in (1.75 m)	Fr	Edgewood High School	Edgewood, MD
F	22	Akeelah Lafleur	6 ft 3 in (1.91 m)	So	Burlington County Institute of Technology; Fairleigh Dickinson	Willingboro, NJ
G	23	Keyarah Rainey	5 ft 9 in (1.75 m)	Fr	Osbourn Park High School	Woodbridge, VA
F	24	Peyton White	6 ft 2 in (1.88 m)	Fr	Gainesville High School	Gainesville, VA
G	57	Lisen Curman	5 ft 10 in (1.78 m)	Fr	Alvik Basket	Stockholm, Sweden

Head coach

- Laura Harper (Maryland)

Assistant coach(es)

- Eric Atkins (Notre Dame)
- Tony DiClemente (Stony Brook)
- Zion Sanders (Iowa)
- Lorie Khalil (Moravian)
- Nick Boboshko (Towson)

Legend

- (C) Team captain
- (S) Suspended
- (I) Ineligible
- (W) Walk-on
- Injured
- Current redshirt

Roster
Last update: July 22, 2026

== Schedule and results ==
Date time, TV	Rank^{#}	Opponent^{#}	Result	Record	High points	High rebounds	High assists	Site (attendance) city, state
Exhibition
October 18, 2026*; 2:00 p.m.		at George Washington	L 69–72		15 – Renninger	9 – Wilkerson	5 – Renninger	Charles E. Smith Center (758); Washington, D.C.
Non-conference regular season
November 2, 2026*; 8:00 p.m., B1G+		at No. 10 Iowa	L 45–73	0–1	13 – Shepard	8 – Wilkerson	2 – Renninger	Carver–Hawkeye Arena (13,131); Iowa City, IA
November 5, 2026*; 11:00 a.m., FloCollege		Frostburg State	L 92–94 ^{2OT}	0–2	20 – Khalil	14 – White	4 – Khalil	SECU Arena (4,289); Towson, MD
November 9, 2026*; 4:00 p.m., FloCollege		Delaware	W 57–55	1–2	15 – Sheppard	8 – Wilkerson	4 – Wilkerson	SECU Arena (410); Towson, MD
November 13, 2026*; 11:00 a.m., ESPN+		at Loyola Maryland; 410 Invitational semifinals	W 57–53	2–2	10 – Tied	8 – Wilkerson	4 – Shepard	Reitz Arena (1,214); Baltimore, MD
November 15, 2026*; 3:30 p.m., Monumental/FloCollege		UMBC; 410 Invitational championship	W 58–48	3–2	18 – Shepard	9 – White	3 – Matulevicius	SECU Arena (640); Towson, MD
November 18, 2026*; 7:00 p.m., ESPN+		at Villanova	L 59–62	3–3	16 – Shepard	6 – Tied	3 – Tied	Finneran Pavilion (1,791); Villanova, PA
November 20, 2026*; 5:30 p.m., ESPN+		at Lehigh	L 52–58	3–4	12 – Watters	7 – Wilkerson	3 – Tied	Stabler Arena (597); Bethlehem, PA
November 28, 2026*; 4:00 p.m., Monumental/FloCollege		Maryland						SECU Arena; Towson, MD
December 3, 2026*; 6:00 p.m., MEAC Network		at Coppin State						Physical Education Complex; Baltimore, MD
December 20, 2026*; 11:30 a.m., ESPN+		vs. Bethune–Cookman; Hatters Holiday Hoops Classic						Insight Credit Union Arena; DeLand, FL
December 21, 2026*; 11:30 a.m., ESPN+		at Stetson; Hatters Holiday Hoops Classic						Edmunds Center; DeLand, FL
December 29, 2026*; 3:00 p.m., Monumental/FloCollege		Maryland Eastern Shore						SECU Arena; Towson, MD
CAA regular season
January 1, 2027; 2:00 p.m., FloCollege		at Stony Brook						Stony Brook Arena; Stony Brook, NY
January 3, 2027; 1:00 p.m., Monumental/FloCollege		Elon						SECU Arena; Towson, MD
January 8, 2027; 6:00 p.m., FloCollege		at Monmouth						OceanFirst Bank Center; West Long Branch, NJ
January 10, 2027; 3:00 p.m., FloCollege		at Hofstra						Mack Sports Complex; Hempstead, NY
January 15, 2027; 6:30 p.m., FloCollege		Campbell						SECU Arena; Towson, MD
January 17, 2027; 2:00 p.m., Monumental/FloCollege		Hampton						SECU Arena; Towson, MD
January 22, 2027; 7:00 p.m., FloCollege		at Northeastern						Cabot Center; Boston, MA
January 24, 2027; 2:00 p.m., FloCollege		at Drexel						Daskalakis Athletic Center; Philadelphia, PA
January 29, 2027; 11:00 a.m., FloCollege		Hofstra						SECU Arena; Towson, MD
February 5, 2027; 6:00 p.m., FloCollege		at UNC Wilmington						Trask Coliseum; Wilmington, NC
February 7, 2027; 1:00 p.m., FloCollege		at Charleston						TD Arena; Charleston, SC
February 12, 2027; 6:30 p.m., Monumental/FloCollege		William & Mary						SECU Arena; Towson, MD
February 14, 2027; 1:00 p.m., Monumental/FloCollege		Stony Brook						SECU Arena; Towson, MD
February 19, 2027; 6:30 p.m., Monumental/FloCollege		Monmouth						SECU Arena; Towson, MD
February 26, 2027; 7:00 p.m., FloCollege		at Hampton						Hampton Convocation Center; Hampton, VA
February 28, 2027; 1:00 p.m., FloCollege		at William & Mary						Kaplan Arena; Williamsburg, VA
March 4, 2027; 6:30 p.m., Monumental/FloCollege		North Carolina A&T						SECU Arena; Towson, MD
March 6, 2027; 2:00 p.m., Monumental/FloCollege		Drexel						SECU Arena; Towson, MD
CAA tournament
March 10–14, 2027; TBA, FloCollege		vs.						CareFirst Arena; Washington, D.C.
*Non-conference game. ^{#}Rankings from AP Poll. (#) Tournament seedings in parentheses. All times are in Eastern.
