= 2026–27 UMBC Retrievers women's basketball team =

American college basketball season

2026–27 UMBC Retrievers women's basketball
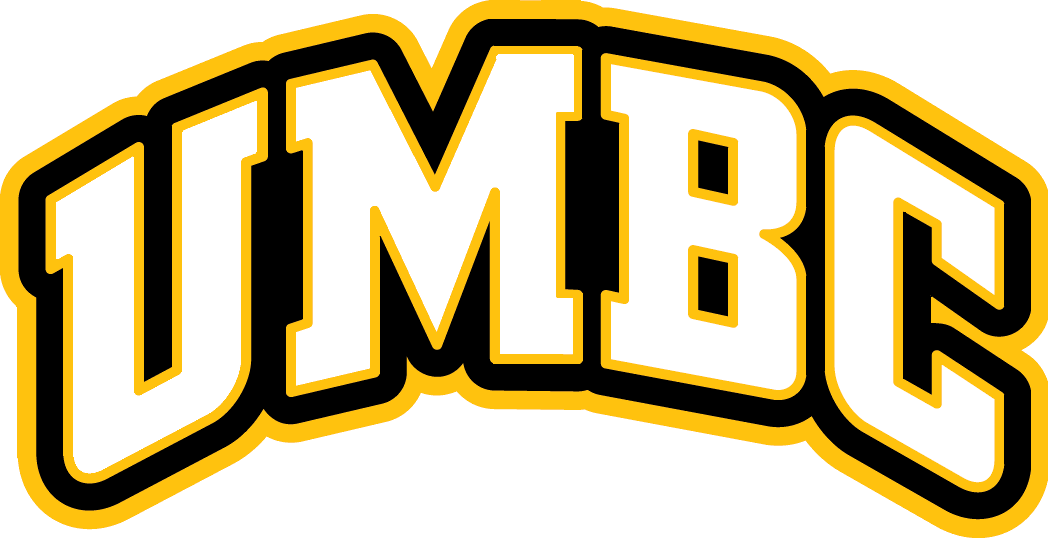
- Conference: America East Conference
- Record: 1–0 (0–0 America East)
- Head coach: Candice Hill (3rd season)
- Associate head coach: Delmar "Buck" Carey
- Assistant coaches: Reggie Daniels; Maggie Tien
- Home arena: Chesapeake Employers Insurance Arena

2026–27 America East Conference women's basketball standings
	Conf.				Overall
Team	W		L	PCT	W		L	PCT
Albany	0	–	0	–	1	–	0	1.000
Bryant	0	–	0	–	1	–	0	1.000
New Hampshire	0	–	0	–	1	–	0	1.000
NJIT	0	–	0	–	1	–	0	1.000
UMass Lowell	0	–	0	–	1	–	0	1.000
UMBC	0	–	0	–	1	–	0	1.000
Vermont	0	–	0	–	1	–	0	1.000
Maine	0	–	0	–	0	–	0	–
Binghamton	0	–	0	–	0	–	1	.000
† 2027 America East tournament winner

The 2026–27 UMBC Retrievers women's basketball team will represent the University of Maryland, Baltimore County during the 2026–27 NCAA Division I women's basketball season. The Retrievers, led by third-year head coach Candice Hill, will play their home games at the Chesapeake Employers Insurance Arena in Catonsville, Maryland, and compete as a member of the America East Conference.

== Previous season ==
The Highlanders finished the 2025–26 season 17–15 overall and 10–6 in America East play, finishing in a tie for third in the conference with Binghamton. As the No. 4 seed in the America East tournament, they defeated No. 5 NJIT 65–66 in the quarterfinals with a game-winning two-point shot by forward Jade Tillman. They then advanced to the semifinals, where they lost in double overtime 65–68 to reigning conference champions and top-seeded Vermont.

Following the America East tournament, the Retrievers earned and accepted an at-large bid to the WNIT, their second overall and first since 2011. They defeated Ohio 62–58 in overtime in Round 1, before falling 53–66 to Marshall in Round 2 to end their season.

== Offseason ==
=== Departures ===
UMBC departures
Name	Number	Pos.	Height	Year	Hometown	Reason for departure
Lauren Thompson	12	Guard	5'6"	Sophomore	Branford, CT	Entered transfer portal
Kenya Ramsey	13	Guard	6'0"	Sophomore	Virginia Beach, VA	Transferred to Morgan State (Note: Did not play in the 2025–26 season.)
Delaney Yarborough	14	Center	6'3"	Senior	Ellicott City, MD	Graduated
Carmen Yánez	15	Guard	5'6"	Senior	Las Palmas, Spain	Graduated, returned as team graduate assistant
Jade Tillman	24	Forward	6'1"	Junior	Rockville, MD	Transferred to Ole Miss

=== Incoming transfers ===
UMBC incoming transfers
Name	Number	Pos.	Height	Year	Hometown	Previous school
Shariah Baynes	0	Guard	5'7"	Junior	Philadelphia, PA	Towson
Jeanine Brandsma	9	Center	6'2"	(redshirt) Senior	Éguzon-Chantôme, France	Austin Peay
Angela Williams	11	Forward	6'0"	Junior	New Orleans, LA	James Madison
Alden Yergey	12	Guard	5'9"	Junior	Nokesville, VA	Siena

=== Recruiting class ===
There was no 2026 recruiting class.

== Preseason ==
On September 28, 2026, the America East Conference released its preseason poll. UMBC was picked to finish second in the conference.

=== Preseason rankings ===
America East Preseason Poll
Place	Team	Votes
1	Binghamton	60 (6)
2	UMBC	57 (2)
3	Vermont	48 (1)
4	Maine	41
5	Bryant	40
6	NJIT	29
7	Albany	25
8	New Hampshire	16
9	UMass Lowell	8
(#) first-place votes

=== Preseason All-America East Team ===
Preseason All-America East Team
Player	Year	Position
Heidi Williams	Sophomore	Guard

== Roster ==
2026–27 UMBC Retrievers women's basketball team
Players
Coaches

Pos.	#	Name	Height	Year	Previous school	Hometown
G	0	Shariah Baynes	5 ft 7 in (1.7 m)	Jr	Paul VI High School; Towson	Philadelphia, PA
G	1	Tiara Bellamy	5 ft 7 in (1.7 m)	RS Sr	Immaculate Conception High School; Saint Peter's	Plainfield, NJ
G	2	Dagny Slomack	5 ft 6 in (1.68 m)	Jr	Newark Academy; Central Connecticut	South Orange, NJ
G	3	Heidi Williams	6 ft 0 in (1.83 m)	So	Saint Frances Academy	Prince George's County, MD
G	4	Kennedy Austin	5 ft 9 in (1.75 m)	So	Maret School	Waldorf, MD
G	5	Sadaya Jones	5 ft 9 in (1.75 m)	So	Morgantown High School	Morgantown, WV
G	8	Syd Sutton	5 ft 9 in (1.75 m)	Fr	Saint Frances Academy	Glen Burnie, MD
C	9	Jeanine Brandsma	6 ft 2 in (1.88 m)	RS Sr	Lycée Ernest Couteau; Austin Peay	Éguzon-Chantôme, France
F	10	Alaina Williams	6 ft 1 in (1.85 m)	Sr	Brooks-DeBartolo Collegiate High School; Idaho State	Apollo Beach, FL
F	11	Angela Williams	6 ft 0 in (1.83 m)	Jr	Shades Valley High School; James Madison	New Orleans, LA
G	12	Alden Yergey	5 ft 9 in (1.75 m)	Jr	Brentsville District High School; Siena	Nokesville, VA
F/C	17	Maisie Crowley	6 ft 4 in (1.93 m)	So	Bishop McNamara High School	London, England
F	21	Gabby Scott	6 ft 0 in (1.83 m)	Sr	Howard High School; Towson	Ellicott City, MD
F	24	Cai Roberson	5 ft 9 in (1.75 m)	Fr	IMG Academy	Upper Marlboro, MD

Head coach

- Candice Hill (Loyola (MD))

Assistant coach(es)

- Delmar "Buck" Carey (Bowie State)
- Reggie Daniels (Hood)
- Maggie Tien (Washington Adventist)

Legend

- (C) Team captain
- (S) Suspended
- (I) Ineligible
- (W) Walk-on
- Injured
- Current redshirt

Roster
Last update: September 23, 2026

== Schedule and results ==
Date time, TV	Rank^{#}	Opponent^{#}	Result	Record	High points	High rebounds	High assists	Site (attendance) city, state
Non-conference regular season
November 2, 2026*; 6:00 p.m.		Stevenson	W 92−29	1−0	19 – Williams	7 – Crowley	6 – Baynes	Chesapeake Employers Insurance Arena (646); Baltimore, MD
November 5, 2026*; TBA		Mount St. Mary's; AE–Metro Challenge						Chesapeake Employers Insurance Arena; Baltimore, MD
November 8, 2026*; TBA		at Quinnipiac; AE–Metro Challenge						M&T Bank Arena; Hamden, CT
November 13, 2026*; 6:30 p.m.		Morgan State; UA 410 Invitational first round						Chesapeake Employers Insurance Arena; Baltimore, MD
November 15, 2026*; 1:00/3:30 p.m.		vs. Towson or Loyola Maryland; UA 410 Invitational						SECU Arena; Towson, MD
November 18, 2026*; 11:00 a.m.		at Pittsburgh						Petersen Events Center; Pittsburgh, PA
November 21, 2026*; 1:00 p.m.		at Brown						Pizzitola Sports Center; Providence, RI
November 27, 2026*; 12:00 p.m.		at Iona; Iona Turkey Tip-Off first round						Hynes Athletic Center; New Rochelle, NY
November 28, 2026*; TBD		vs. Drexel or Southern Miss; Iona Turkey Tip-Off						Hynes Athletic Center; New Rochelle, NY
December 3, 2026*; TBD		at Navy						Alumni Hall; Annapolis, MD
December 7, 2026*; 6:00 p.m.		Coppin State						Chesapeake Employers Insurance Arena; Baltimore, MD
December 12, 2026*; 2:00 p.m.		Notre Dame of Maryland						Chesapeake Employers Insurance Arena; Baltimore, MD
December 18, 2026*; 11:00 a.m.		at Maryland						Xfinity Center; College Park, MD
December 21, 2026*; 12:00 p.m.		American						Chesapeake Employers Insurance Arena; Baltimore, MD
America East regular season
December 31, 2026; TBA		at Binghamton						Dr. Bai Lee Court; Vestal, NY
January 3, 2027; TBA		NJIT						Chesapeake Employers Insurance Arena; Baltimore, MD
January 7, 2027; 6:00 p.m.		Maine						Chesapeake Employers Insurance Arena; Baltimore, MD
January 9, 2027; 2:00 p.m.		New Hampshire						Chesapeake Employers Insurance Arena; Baltimore, MD
January 14, 2027; 12:00 p.m.		Bryant						Chesapeake Employers Insurance Arena; Baltimore, MD
January 16, 2027; 2:00 p.m.		at Albany						Broadview Center; Albany, NY
January 21, 2027; 6:00 p.m.		at Vermont						Patrick Gym; Burlington, VT
January 23, 2027; TBA		at UMass Lowell						Kennedy Family Athletic Complex; Lowell, MA
January 28, 2027; TBA		Binghamton						Chesapeake Employers Insurance Arena; Baltimore, MD
February 4, 2027; TBA		at Bryant						Chace Athletic Center; Smithfield, RI
February 6, 2027; TBA		Albany						Chesapeake Employers Insurance Arena; Baltimore, MD
February 11, 2027; TBA		at Maine						Memorial Gymnasium; Orono, ME
February 13, 2027; TBA		at New Hampshire						Lundholm Gymnasium; Durham, NH
February 18, 2027; 6:00 p.m.		Vermont						Chesapeake Employers Insurance Arena; Baltimore, MD
February 20, 2027; 2:00 p.m.		UMass Lowell						Chesapeake Employers Insurance Arena; Baltimore, MD
February 25, 2027; 6:00 p.m.		at NJIT						Wellness and Events Center; Newark, NJ
*Non-conference game. ^{#}Rankings from AP Poll. (#) Tournament seedings in parentheses. All times are in Eastern.
