= 2026–27 UMass Lowell River Hawks women's basketball team =

Intercollegiate basketball season

2026–27 UMass Lowell River Hawks women's basketball
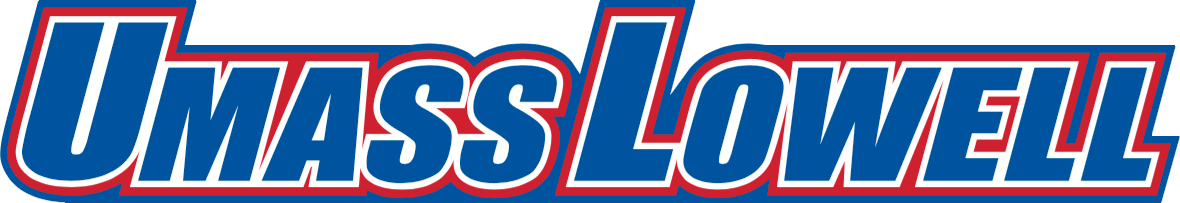
- Conference: America East Conference
- Record: 2–4 (0–0 America East)
- Head coach: Brianna Finch (1st season)
- Assistant coaches: Sherill Baker; Didier Dinh; Meagan Morelli
- Home arena: Kennedy Family Athletic Complex

2026–27 America East Conference women's basketball standings
	Conf.				Overall
Team	W		L	PCT	W		L	PCT
Bryant	0	–	0	–	5	–	0	1.000
NJIT	0	–	0	–	5	–	1	.833
Maine	0	–	0	–	4	–	1	.800
Albany	0	–	0	–	4	–	2	.667
New Hampshire	0	–	0	–	4	–	2	.667
UMBC	0	–	0	–	4	–	2	.667
Vermont	0	–	0	–	4	–	2	.667
Binghamton	0	–	0	–	3	–	3	.500
UMass Lowell	0	–	0	–	2	–	4	.333
† 2027 America East tournament winner As of November 22, 2026

The 2026–27 UMass Lowell River Hawks women's basketball team currently represents the University of Massachusetts Lowell during the 2026–27 NCAA Division I women's basketball season. The River Hawks, led by first-year head coach Brianna Finch, play their home games at the Kennedy Family Athletic Complex in Lowell, Massachusetts, and compete as a member of the America East Conference.

== Previous season ==
Under Jon Plefka in his first year, the River Hawks finished the 2025–26 season 8–21 overall and 2–14 in America East play, finishing last in the conference for the second straight season. They failed to qualify for the America East tournament.

On March 13, following the conclusion of the season, head coach Jon Plefka mutually parted ways with the program after his only season with the team. On April 4, Brianna Finch was announced as the team's new head coach. Finch had most recently served as an assistant coach for George Washington, where she helped guide the team to an 18–18 record and a WNIT Great 8 appearance in the 2025–26 season.

== Offseason ==
=== Departures ===
UMass Lowell departures
Name	Num.	Pos.	Height	Year	Hometown	Reason for departure
Jennah Johnson	0	Guard	5'8"	Sophomore	Woodbridge, NJ	TBD; not listed on roster
Amina Kameric	1	Guard	5'9"	Senior	Seattle, WA	Graduated
Jaini Edmonds	2	Guard	5'9"	Senior	Worcester, MA	Graduated
Paris Gilmore	4	Guard	5'7"	Junior	Youngstown, OH	Transferred to Marshall
Sabrina Larsson	5	Guard	5'8"	Senior	Uppsala, Sweden	Graduated
Sophie Baydanov	10	Guard	5'9"	Senior	Vienna, Austria	Graduated
Anabelle Latorre Ciria	18	Forward	6'2"	Graduate Student	Zaragoza, Spain	Graduated
Ella Ner	30	Guard	5'7"	Senior	Bene Atarot, Israel	Graduated (Note: Graduated and removed from roster in January 2026.)

=== Incoming transfers ===
UMass Lowell incoming transfers
Name	Num.	Pos.	Height	Year	Hometown	Previous school
Yazmin Edwards	5	Guard	5'9"	Junior	Ipswich, England	Eastern Arizona (NJCAA)
Kylie Diaz	40	Forward	6'1"	Senior	Albertville, MN	Peru State (NAIA)

=== Recruiting class ===
There was no 2026 recruiting class.

== Preseason ==
On September 28, 2026, the America East Conference released its preseason poll. UMass Lowell was picked to finish last in the conference.

=== Preseason rankings ===
America East Preseason Poll
Place	Team	Votes
1	Binghamton	60 (6)
2	UMBC	57 (2)
3	Vermont	48 (1)
4	Maine	41
5	Bryant	40
6	NJIT	29
7	Albany	25
8	New Hampshire	16
9	UMass Lowell	8
(#) first-place votes

=== Preseason All-America East Team ===
No players were selected for the Preseason All-America East Team.

== Roster ==
2026–27 UMass Lowell River Hawks women's basketball team
Players
Coaches

Pos.	#	Name	Height	Year	Previous school	Hometown
G	2	Milena Lund	5 ft 7 in (1.7 m)	Fr	Norges Topidrettsgymnas	Oslo, Norway
G	3	Kayla Solomon	5 ft 8 in (1.73 m)	Fr	Saint Mary's High School	Central Islip, NY
G	5	Yazmin Edwards	5 ft 9 in (1.75 m)	Jr	Copleston High School; Eastern Arizona	Ipswich, England
G	6	Emina Kameric	5 ft 11 in (1.8 m)	Jr	John F. Kennedy School, Berlin	Seattle, WA
G	7	Carla Subirats	5 ft 5 in (1.65 m)	Jr	Institut Gorgs	Barcelona, Spain
G	9	Hedda Hakanson	5 ft 9 in (1.75 m)	Fr	Bromma gymnasium	Stockholm, Sweden
F	10	Adna Halilbasic	6 ft 2 in (1.88 m)	Jr	Hittorf Gymnasium; Louisiana Tech	Recklinghausen, Germany
G	11	Tyanna Medina	5 ft 7 in (1.7 m)	So	Lawrence High School	Lawrence, MA
G	12	Maddie Rice	5 ft 8 in (1.73 m)	Sr	St. Anne's-Belfield School	Charlottesville, VA
F	13	Klimentina Modeva	6 ft 8 in (2.03 m)	Jr	OEMUC St. Naum of Ohrid; Weatherford College	Ohrid, North Macedonia
F	19	Izabella Asp	6 ft 0 in (1.83 m)	Fr	Sandagymnasium	Jönköping, Sweden
F	21	Nia Chima	6 ft 1 in (1.85 m)	Jr	Crestwood Preparatory College	Toronto, Ontario
F	22	Achol Agot	6 ft 1 in (1.85 m)	Fr	Daramalan College	Canberra, Australia
G	23	Gwen Marcotte (W)	5 ft 9 in (1.75 m)	Sr	St. Paul Diocesan	Worcester, MA
F	40	Kylie Diaz	6 ft 1 in (1.85 m)	Sr	St. Michael-Albertville High School; Peru State	Albertville, MN

Head coach

- Brianna Finch (Sonoma State)

Assistant coach(es)

- Sherill Baker (Georgia)
- Didier Dinh (Salem State)
- Meagan Morelli (Fairfield)

Legend

- (C) Team captain
- (S) Suspended
- (I) Ineligible
- (W) Walk-on
- Injured
- Current redshirt

Roster
Last update: September 24, 2026

== Schedule and results ==
Date time, TV	Rank^{#}	Opponent^{#}	Result	Record	High points	High rebounds	High assists	Site (attendance) city, state
Exhibition
October 20, 2026*; 6:00 p.m.		Southern New Hampshire	W 80–63		–	–	–	Kennedy Family Athletic Complex; Lowell, MA
Non-conference regular season
November 2, 2026*; 4:00 p.m., ESPN+		Saint Anselm	W 77−53	1−0	20 – Solomon	8 – Chima	5 – Lund	Kennedy Family Athletic Complex (253); Lowell, MA
November 5, 2026*; 6:00 p.m., ESPN+		Niagara; AE–Metro Challenge	W 78–53	2–0	13 – Tied	9 – Chima	3 – Lund	Kennedy Family Athletic Complex (208); Lowell, MA
November 8, 2026*; 12:00 p.m., ESPN+		at Canisius; AE–Metro Challenge	L 61–73	2–1	18 – Solomon	6 – Tied	3 – Lund	Koessler Athletic Center (505); Buffalo, NY
November 11, 2026*; 6:00 p.m., ACCNX		at Boston College	L 57–86	2–2	17 – Chima	8 – Agok	3 – Tied	Conte Forum (676); Chestnut Hill, MA
November 15, 2026*; 12:00 p.m., ESPN+		West Georgia	L 53–65	2–3	12 – Agok	9 – Agok	5 – Solomon	Kennedy Family Athletic Complex (196); Lowell, MA
November 18, 2026*; 6:00 p.m., ESPN+		Central Connecticut	L 46–65	2–4	17 – Rice	11 – Agok	2 – Rice	Kennedy Family Athletic Complex (172); Lowell, MA
November 22, 2026*; 1:00 p.m., ESPN+		at Merrimack						Lawler Arena; North Andover, MA
November 28, 2026*; 2:00 p.m.		New Haven						Kennedy Family Athletic Complex; Lowell, MA
December 2, 2026*; 6:00 p.m.		Boston University						Kennedy Family Athletic Complex; Lowell, MA
December 5, 2026*; 4:00 p.m.		at Stonehill						Merkert Gymnasium; North Easton, MA
December 9, 2026*; 6:00 p.m.		Dartmouth						Kennedy Family Athletic Complex; Lowell, MA
December 12, 2026*; 1:00 p.m.		at Providence						Alumni Hall; Providence, RI
December 16, 2026*; 6:00 p.m.		at UMass						Mullins Center; Amherst, MA
December 22, 2026*; 11:00 a.m.		at Northeastern						Cabot Center; Boston, MA
America East regular season
December 31, 2026; 2:00 p.m., ESPN+		Albany						Kennedy Family Athletic Complex; Lowell, MA
January 3, 2027; 1:00 p.m., ESPN+		at New Hampshire						Lundholm Gymnasium; Durham, NH
January 7, 2027; 11:00 a.m., ESPN+		Vermont						Kennedy Family Athletic Complex; Lowell, MA
January 9, 2027; 2:00 p.m., ESPN+		at Bryant						Chace Athletic Center; Smithfield, RI
January 14, 2027; 11:00 a.m., ESPN+		at Binghamton						Dr. Bai Lee Court; Vestal, NY
January 16, 2027; 2:00 p.m., ESPN+		Maine						Kennedy Family Athletic Complex; Lowell, MA
January 23, 2027; 5:00 p.m., ESPN+		UMBC						Kennedy Family Athletic Complex; Lowell, MA
January 28, 2027; 6:30 p.m., ESPN+		at Albany						Broadview Center; Albany, NY
January 30, 2027; 2:00 p.m., ESPN+		NJIT						Kennedy Family Athletic Complex; Lowell, MA
February 4, 2027; 5:00 p.m., ESPN+		at Maine						Memorial Gymnasium; Orono, ME
February 6, 2027; 2:00 p.m., ESPN+		New Hampshire						Kennedy Family Athletic Complex; Lowell, MA
February 13, 2027; 1:00 p.m., ESPN+		Binghamton						Kennedy Family Athletic Complex; Lowell, MA
February 18, 2027; 6:00 p.m., ESPN+		at NJIT						Wellness and Events Center; Newark, NJ
February 20, 2027; 2:00 p.m., ESPN+		at UMBC						Chesapeake Employers Insurance Arena; Baltimore, MD
February 25, 2027; 6:00 p.m., ESPN+		Bryant						Kennedy Family Athletic Complex; Lowell, MA
February 27, 2027; 2:00 p.m., ESPN+		at Vermont						Patrick Gym; Burlington, VT
*Non-conference game. ^{#}Rankings from AP Poll. (#) Tournament seedings in parentheses. All times are in Eastern.
