= 2026–27 Drexel Dragons women's basketball team =

American college basketball season

2026–27 Drexel Dragons women's basketball
- Conference: Coastal Athletic Association
- Record: 1–1 (0–0 CAA)
- Head coach: Amy Mallon (7th season)
- Associate head coach: Stacy Weiss
- Assistant coaches: Kayla Bacon; Stephen Perretta; Mike Perretta
- Home arena: Daskalakis Athletic Center

2026–27 CAA women's basketball standings
	Conf.				Overall
Team	W		L	PCT	W		L	PCT
Stony Brook	0	–	0	–	4	–	0	1.000
Monmouth	0	–	0	–	3	–	1	.750
Northeastern	0	–	0	–	2	–	1	.667
UNC Wilmington	0	–	0	–	2	–	1	.667
Towson	0	–	0	–	3	–	2	.600
Charleston	0	–	0	–	2	–	2	.500
Elon	0	–	0	–	2	–	2	.500
Hofstra	0	–	0	–	2	–	2	.500
North Carolina A&T	0	–	0	–	2	–	2	.500
William & Mary	0	–	0	–	2	–	2	.500
Drexel	0	–	0	–	1	–	3	.250
Hampton	0	–	0	–	1	–	3	.250
Campbell	0	–	0	–	1	–	4	.200
† 2027 CAA tournament winner As of November 16, 2026

The 2026–27 Drexel Dragons women's basketball team currently represents Drexel University during the 2026–27 NCAA Division I women's basketball season. The Dragons, led by seventh-year head coach Amy Mallon, will play their home games at the Daskalakis Athletic Center in Philadelphia, Pennsylvania as a member of the Coastal Athletic Association.

== Previous season ==
The Dragons finished the 2025–26 season 21–11 overall and 13–5 in CAA play, finshing in a tie for second in the conference with Campbell. As the No. 3 seed in the CAA tournament, the Dragons earned a double-bye to the quarterfinals, where they defeated No. 6 Elon 68–53. They could not advance to the championship game, as they were upset by No. 10 Hofstra in the semifinals, losing 49–53 in overtime.

Following their tournament elimination, the Dragons accepted an at-large bid to the WNIT, their 12th overall appearance and their first since 2023. They lost in the first round to St. Bonaventure 67–69 in overtime to end their season.

== Offseason ==
=== Departures ===
Drexel departures
Name	Number	Pos.	Height	Year	Hometown	Reason for departure
Amaris Baker	3	Guard	5'8"	Graduate student	Philadelphia, PA	Graduated
Jalyn McNeill	4	Forward	5'9"	Senior	Damascus, MD	Graduated
Deja Evans	11	Forward	6'2"	Junior	Conshohocken, PA	Transferred to Saint Joseph's
Grace O'Neill	12	Guard	5'7"	Senior	West Chester, PA	Graduated
Iriona Gravley	25	Forward	6'0"	Sophomore	Williamstown, NJ	Transferred to Fairleigh Dickinson

=== Incoming transfers ===
Drexel incoming transfers
Name	Number	Pos.	Height	Year	Hometown	Previous school
Meliah Van-Otoo	7	Guard	5'4"	Graduate student	Drexel Hill, PA	Loyola Maryland
Aisha Dabo	24	Forward	6'2"	Graduate student	Queens, NY	Hampton

=== Recruiting class ===
There was no 2026 recruiting class.

== Preseason ==
On October 15, 2026, the CAA released its annual preseason coaches poll and awards. Drexel was picked to finish third in the conference.

=== Preseason rankings ===
CAA Preseason Coaches Poll
Place	Team	Votes
1	Monmouth	144 (12)
2	Elon	116
3	Drexel	109
4	William & Mary	108 (1)
5	Towson	99
6	North Carolina A&T	89
7	Stony Brook	88
8	Charleston	71
9	Hofstra	56
10	Hampton	51
11	Northeastern	35
12	Campbell	30
13	UNC Wilmington	18
(#) first-place votes

=== Preseason All-CAA Teams ===
Preseason All-CAA Teams
Player	Year	Position	Team
Laine McGurk	Senior	Guard	First

=== CAA Preseason Honorable Mentions ===
No players were named CAA Preseason Honorable Mentions.

== Roster ==
2026–27 Drexel Dragons women's basketball team
Players
Coaches

Pos.	#	Name	Height	Year	Previous school	Hometown
F	0	Miley Malcolm	6 ft 2 in (1.88 m)	Fr	Porter Ridge High School	Indian Trail, NC
G/F	2	Mariah Watkins	6 ft 0 in (1.83 m)	Jr	Webster Schroeder High School	Rochester, NY
G	3	Ava Fajardo	5 ft 5 in (1.65 m)	Fr	Blair Academy	Randolph, NJ
G	5	Emma Montanari	5 ft 9 in (1.75 m)	Fr	East Lincoln High School	Charlotte, NC
G	7	Meliah Van-Otoo	5 ft 4 in (1.63 m)	GS	Westtown School; Loyola Maryland	Drexel Hill, PA
G	8	Julia Garcia Roig	5 ft 7 in (1.7 m)	Jr	Escola IPSI; Xavier	Barcelona, Spain
G	10	Laine McGurk	5 ft 10 in (1.78 m)	Sr	West Chester Rustin High School	West Chester, PA
G	20	Molly Rullo	5 ft 11 in (1.8 m)	So	Cardinal O'Hara High School	Drexel Hill, PA
G/F	23	Bria Watkins	6 ft 0 in (1.83 m)	So	Webster Schroeder High School	Rochester, NY
F	24	Aisha Dabo	6 ft 2 in (1.88 m)	GS	Forsyth Central High School; Hampton	Queens, NY
G	31	Megan Rullo	5 ft 8 in (1.73 m)	Fr	Cardinal O'Hara High School	Drexel Hill, PA
G/F	33	Emilee Jones	5 ft 10 in (1.78 m)	Jr	Mansfield Timberview High School	Grand Prairie, TX
F	55	Molly Lavin	6 ft 2 in (1.88 m)	GS	City of London Academy, Southwark; American	London, England

Head coach

- Amy Mallon (Saint Joseph's)

Assistant coach(es)

- Stacy Weiss (Drexel)
- Kayla Bacon (Drexel)
- Stephen Perretta (Villanova)
- Mike Perretta (Villanova)

Legend

- (C) Team captain
- (S) Suspended
- (I) Ineligible
- (W) Walk-on
- Injured
- Current redshirt

Roster
Last update: August 19, 2026

== Schedule and results ==
Date time, TV	Rank^{#}	Opponent^{#}	Result	Record	High points	High rebounds	High assists	Site (attendance) city, state
Non-conference regular season
November 2, 2026*; 6:00 p.m., FloCollege		Marist	W 62–47	1–0	15 – McGurk	7 – Tied	7 – Garcia Roig	Daskalakis Athletic Center (579); Philadelphia, PA
November 6, 2026*; 1:00 p.m., FloCollege		at Penn; Big 5 Women's Classic Pod 1	L 70–71	1–1	21 – McGurk	8 – McGurk	9 – Garcia Roig	The Palestra (451); Philadelphia, PA
November 11, 2026*; 6:00 p.m., ACCNX		at Virginia	L 39-81	1-2	–	–	–	John Paul Jones Arena (3,724); Charlottesville, VA
November 15, 2026*; 2:00 p.m., NBCSP/FloCollege		Saint Joseph's; Big 5 Women's Classic Pod 1	L 56-61	1-3	–	–	–	Daskalakis Athletic Center (708); Philadelphia, PA
November 18, 2026*; 6:00 p.m., ESPN+		at American						Bender Arena; Washington, D.C.
November 22, 2026*; 6:00 p.m., ESPN+		at Loyola Maryland						Reitz Arena; Baltimore, MD
November 27, 2026*; 2:30 p.m., ESPN+		vs. Southern Miss; Iona Turkey Tip-Off						Hynes Athletic Center; New Rochelle, NY
November 28, 2026*; TBA, ESPN+		vs. Iona or UMBC; Iona Turkey Tip-Off						Hynes Athletic Center; New Rochelle, NY
December 3, 2026*; 6:00 p.m., NBCSP/FloCollege		Arcadia						Daskalakis Athletic Center; Philadelphia, PA
December 6, 2026*; TBA		TBD; Big 5 Women's Classic						The Palestra; Philadelphia, PA
December 13, 2026*; 12:00 p.m., ACCNX		at Vermont						Patrick Gym; Burlington, VT
December 16, 2026*; 6:00 p.m., NBCSP/FloCollege		Delaware Valley						Daskalakis Athletic Center; Philadelphia, PA
December 21, 2026*; 1:00 p.m., FloCollege		Buffalo						Daskalakis Athletic Center; Philadelphia, PA
December 28, 2026*; 2:30 p.m., FloCollege		NJIT						Daskalakis Athletic Center; Philadelphia, PA
CAA regular season
January 1, 2027; 1:00 p.m., FloCollege		Elon						Daskalakis Athletic Center; Philadelphia, PA
January 3, 2027; 1:00 p.m., FloCollege		at Northeastern						Cabot Center; Boston, MA
January 8, 2027; TBA, FloCollege		at Campbell						Gore Arena; Buies Creek, NC
January 10, 2027; 1:00 p.m., FloCollege		at North Carolina A&T						Corbett Sports Center; Greensboro, NC
January 15, 2027; 6:00 p.m., NBCSP/FloCollege		Stony Brook						Daskalakis Athletic Center; Philadelphia, PA
January 17, 2027; 2:00 p.m., FloCollege		at Monmouth						OceanFirst Bank Center; West Long Branch, NJ
January 22, 2027; 6:00 p.m., NBCSP/FloCollege		Charleston						Daskalakis Athletic Center; Philadelphia, PA
January 24, 2027; 2:00 p.m., FloCollege		Towson						Daskalakis Athletic Center; Philadelphia, PA
January 31, 2027; TBA, FloCollege		at Stony Brook						Stony Brook Arena; Stony Brook, NY
February 5, 2027; 6:00 p.m., FloCollege		at Hofstra						Mack Sports Complex; Hempstead, NY
February 7, 2027; 2:00 p.m., NBCSP/FloCollege		Monmouth						Daskalakis Athletic Center; Philadelphia, PA
February 12, 2027; 6:00 p.m., FloCollege		UNC Wilmington						Daskalakis Athletic Center; Philadelphia, PA
February 14, 2027; 1:00 p.m., NBCSP/FloCollege		William & Mary						Daskalakis Athletic Center; Philadelphia, PA
February 19, 2027; 7:00 p.m., FloCollege		at Elon						Schar Center; Elon, NC
February 21, 2027; TBA, FloCollege		at Hampton						Hampton Convocation Center; Hampton, VA
February 26, 2027; 6:00 p.m., NBCSP/FloCollege		Hofstra						Daskalakis Athletic Center; Philadelphia, PA
February 28, 2027; 2:00 p.m., NBCSP/FloCollege		Northeastern						Daskalakis Athletic Center; Philadelphia, PA
March 6, 2027; TBA, FloCollege		at Towson						SECU Arena; Towson, MD
CAA tournament
March 10–14, 2027; TBA, FloCollege		vs.						CareFirst Arena; Washington, D.C.
*Non-conference game. ^{#}Rankings from AP Poll. (#) Tournament seedings in parentheses. All times are in Eastern.
