= 2026–27 New Hampshire Wildcats women's basketball team =

American college basketball season

2026–27 New Hampshire Wildcats women's basketball
- Conference: America East Conference
- Record: 1–0 (0–0 America East)
- Head coach: Megan Shoniker (3rd season)
- Associate head coach: Corey Boilard
- Assistant coaches: Kennedi Thompson; Alexa Brodie; Grace Heeps
- Home arena: Lundholm Gymnasium

2026–27 America East Conference women's basketball standings
	Conf.				Overall
Team	W		L	PCT	W		L	PCT
Albany	0	–	0	–	1	–	0	1.000
Bryant	0	–	0	–	1	–	0	1.000
New Hampshire	0	–	0	–	1	–	0	1.000
NJIT	0	–	0	–	1	–	0	1.000
UMass Lowell	0	–	0	–	1	–	0	1.000
UMBC	0	–	0	–	1	–	0	1.000
Vermont	0	–	0	–	1	–	0	1.000
Maine	0	–	0	–	0	–	0	–
Binghamton	0	–	0	–	0	–	1	.000
† 2027 America East tournament winner As of November 3, 2026

The 2026–27 New Hampshire Wildcats women's basketball team currently represents the University of New Hampshire during the 2026–27 NCAA Division I women's basketball season. The Wildcats, led by third-year head coach Megan Shoniker, play their home games at the Lundholm Gymnasium in Durham, New Hampshire, and compete as a member of the America East Conference.

== Previous season ==
The Highlanders finished the 2025–26 season 10–20 overall and 4–12 in America East play, both for the second straight season, finishing in a tie for seventh in the conference with Albany. As the No. 8 seed in the America East tournament, they lost 58–77 to No. 2 Maine to end their season.

== Offseason ==
=== Departures ===
New Hampshire departures
Name	Num.	Pos.	Height	Year	Hometown	Reason for departure
Jamie Kent	1	Forward	6'0"	Junior	Dublin, CA	Transferred to Merrimack
Camryn Fauria	3	Guard/Forward	6'0"	Senior	North Attleborough, MA	Graduated
Diana Eliasson	10	Guard	5'7"	Senior	Stockholm, Sweden	Graduated, entered transfer portal
Katie Ledden	20	Guard/Forward	6'0"	Junior	Clark, NJ	Transferred to Sacred Heart
Eva DeChent	21	Guard	5'11"	Junior	Westchester, NY	Transferred to San Diego State
Kenzie Matulonis	24	Guard	5'7"	Graduate Student	Raynham, MA	Graduated
Sydney Lusher	30	Guard	5'11"	Graduate Student	Oneida, NY	Graduated
Lucia Melero Sabat	32	Forward	6'0"	Senior	Barcelona, Spain	Graduated

=== Incoming transfers ===
New Hampshire incoming transfers
Name	Num.	Pos.	Height	Year	Hometown	Previous school
Erin Edmonds	1	Guard	5'10"	Sophomore	Hopewell, VA	Mount St. Mary's
Maya Braxton-Young	8	Guard	5'6"	Junior	Woodbury, NJ	South Plains College (NJCAA)
Anya McKenzie	20	Forward	6'2"	Senior	Luton, England	West Georgia

=== Recruiting class ===
There was no 2026 recruiting class.

== Preseason ==
On September 28, 2026, the America East Conference released its preseason poll. New Hampshire was picked to finish eighth in the conference.

=== Preseason rankings ===
America East Preseason Poll
Place	Team	Votes
1	Binghamton	60 (6)
2	UMBC	57 (2)
3	Vermont	48 (1)
4	Maine	41
5	Bryant	40
6	NJIT	29
7	Albany	25
8	New Hampshire	16
9	UMass Lowell	8
(#) first-place votes

=== Preseason All-America East Team ===
No players were selected for the Preseason All-America East Team.

== Roster ==
2026–27 New Hampshire Wildcats women's basketball team
Players
Coaches

Pos.	#	Name	Height	Year	Previous school	Hometown
G	0	Maggie Cavanaugh	5 ft 9 in (1.75 m)	Sr	St. Rose High School	Point Pleasant Beach, NJ
G	1	Erin Edmonds	5 ft 10 in (1.78 m)	So	Hopewell High School; Mount St. Mary's	Hopewell, VA
G	2	Carolina Williams	5 ft 8 in (1.73 m)	So	Hoosac School	Valatie, NY
F	3	Ella Getz	6 ft 1 in (1.85 m)	Fr	Worcester Academy	Wayland, MA
G	4	Charlotte Jasmin	5 ft 9 in (1.75 m)	Fr	Hartford High School	Hartford, VT
F	7	Delaney Todd	6 ft 1 in (1.85 m)	Fr	Catholic Ladies College, Eltham	Melbourne, Australia
G	8	Maya Braxton-Young	5 ft 6 in (1.68 m)	So	Woodbury Junior-Senior High School; South Plains College	Woodbury, NJ
G	10	Sam Eller	5 ft 11 in (1.8 m)	Fr	St. John's College High School	Olney, MD
F	11	Alia Cordone	6 ft 2 in (1.88 m)	So	Western Reserve Academy	Davis, CA
G	12	Kassidy Thompson	5 ft 10 in (1.78 m)	Sr	Camden Catholic High School; Hofstra	Mullica Hill, NJ
F	20	Anya McKenzie	6 ft 2 in (1.88 m)	Sr	Copleston High School; West Georgia	Luton, England
G	22	Sophie Sabino	5 ft 9 in (1.75 m)	GS	Red Bank Catholic High School; Bucknell	Rumson, NJ
G	23	Elizabeth Lavoie	5 ft 11 in (1.8 m)	Jr	Pinkerton Academy	Derry, NH
F	33	Averie Harding	6 ft 2 in (1.88 m)	So	Egg Harbor Township High School	Egg Harbor Township, NJ
F	35	Scarlet LeVake	6 ft 2 in (1.88 m)	Fr	Red Bank Catholic High School	Catharpin, VA

Head coach

- Megan Shoniker (Rhode Island)

Assistant coach(es)

- Corey Boilard (Keene State)
- Kennedi Thompson (Binghamton)
- Alexa Brodie (Colgate)
- Grace Heeps (Canisius)

Legend

- (C) Team captain
- (S) Suspended
- (I) Ineligible
- (W) Walk-on
- Injured
- Current redshirt

Roster
Last update: September 25, 2026

== Schedule and results ==
Date time, TV	Rank^{#}	Opponent^{#}	Result	Record	High points	High rebounds	High assists	Site (attendance) city, state
Non-conference regular season
November 2, 2026*; TBA, ESPN+		New England	W 1–0	1–0	14 – Williams	6 – Cavanaugh	10 – Cavanaugh	Lundholm Gymnasium (163); Durham, NC
November 5, 2026*; TBA, ESPN+		Canisius; AE–Metro Challenge						Lundholm Gymnasium; Durham, NC
November 8, 2026*; TBA		at Niagara; AE–Metro Challenge						Gallagher Center; Lewiston, NY
November 11, 2026*; TBA		at Dartmouth						Leede Arena; Hanover, NH
November 14, 2026*; TBA		Colgate						Lundholm Gymnasium; Durham, NC
November 18, 2026*; TBA		at Yale						John J. Lee Amphitheater; New Haven, CT
November 22, 2026*; TBA		at Boston University						Case Gym; Boston, MA
November 24, 2026*; TBA		at Providence						Alumni Hall; Providence, RI
November 29, 2026*; TBA		at Central Connecticut						Detrick Gymnasium; New Britain, CT
December 3, 2026*; TBA, ESPN+		Vermont State–Johnson						Lundholm Gymnasium; Durham, NC
December 6, 2026*; TBA		at New Haven						The Hazell Center; West Haven, CT
December 9, 2026*; TBA, ESPN+		Brown						Lundholm Gymnasium; Durham, NC
December 13, 2026*; TBA		at VCU						Siegel Center; Richmond, VA
December 19, 2026*; TBA, ESPN+		UMass						Lundholm Gymnasium; Durham, NC
December 28, 2026*; TBA, ESPN+		Stonehill						Lundholm Gymnasium; Durham, NC
America East regular season
December 31, 2026; TBA, ESPN+		Bryant						Lundholm Gymnasium; Durham, NC
January 3, 2027; TBA, ESPN+		UMass Lowell						Lundholm Gymnasium; Durham, NC
January 7, 2027; TBA, ESPN+		at NJIT						Wellness and Events Center; Newark, NJ
January 9, 2027; TBA, ESPN+		at UMBC						Chesapeake Employers Insurance Arena; Baltimore, MD
January 14, 2027; TBA, ESPN+		at Vermont						Patrick Gym; Burlington, VT
January 21, 2027; TBA, ESPN+		Albany						Lundholm Gymnasium; Durham, NC
January 23, 2027; TBA, ESPN+		Binghamton						Lundholm Gymnasium; Durham, NC
January 28, 2027; TBA, ESPN+		at Bryant						Chace Athletic Center; Smithfield, RI
January 30, 2027; TBA, ESPN+		Maine						Lundholm Gymnasium; Durham, NC
February 4, 2027; TBA, ESPN+		Vermont						Lundholm Gymnasium; Durham, NC
February 6, 2027; TBA, ESPN+		at UMass Lowell						Kennedy Family Athletic Complex; Lowell, MA
February 11, 2027; TBA, ESPN+		NJIT						Lundholm Gymnasium; Durham, NC
February 13, 2027; TBA, ESPN+		UMBC						Lundholm Gymnasium; Durham, NC
February 20, 2027; TBA, ESPN+		at Maine						Memorial Gymnasium; Orono, ME
February 25, 2027; TBA, ESPN+		at Albany						Broadview Center; Albany, NY
February 27, 2027; TBA, ESPN+		at Binghamton						Dr. Bai Lee Court; Vestal, NY
*Non-conference game. ^{#}Rankings from AP Poll. (#) Tournament seedings in parentheses. All times are in Eastern.
