= 2026–27 NJIT Highlanders women's basketball team =

American college basketball season

2026–27 NJIT Highlanders women's basketball
- Conference: America East Conference
- Record: 1–0 (0–0 AmEast)
- Head coach: Mike Lane (9th season)
- Assistant coaches: Colleen Moriarty; Payce Lange; John Hannafin
- Home arena: Wellness and Events Center

2026–27 America East Conference women's basketball standings
	Conf.				Overall
Team	W		L	PCT	W		L	PCT
Albany	0	–	0	–	1	–	0	1.000
Bryant	0	–	0	–	1	–	0	1.000
New Hampshire	0	–	0	–	1	–	0	1.000
NJIT	0	–	0	–	1	–	0	1.000
UMass Lowell	0	–	0	–	1	–	0	1.000
UMBC	0	–	0	–	1	–	0	1.000
Vermont	0	–	0	–	1	–	0	1.000
Maine	0	–	0	–	0	–	0	–
Binghamton	0	–	0	–	0	–	1	.000
† 2027 America East tournament winner As of November 6, 2026

The 2026–27 NJIT Highlanders women's basketball team currently represents the New Jersey Institute of Technology (NJIT) during the 2025–26 NCAA Division I women's basketball season. The Highlanders, led by ninth-year head coach Mike Lane, play their home games at the Wellness and Events Center in Newark, New Jersey, and compete as a member of the America East Conference.

== Previous season ==
The Highlanders finished the 2025–26 season 19–13 overall and 9–7 in America East play, finishing fifth in the conference. As the No. 5 seed in the America East tournament, they lost in the quarterfinals 65–66 to No. 4 UMBC due to a game-winning two-point shot by junior Retrievers forward Jade Tillman.

Following the America East tournament, the Highlanders earned and accepted an at-large bid to the WNIT, making it their first ever postseason appearance in program history. They defeated Merrimack 68–65 in Round 1, before losing 52–59 in Round 2 to Army to end their season.

== Offseason ==
=== Departures ===
NJIT departures
Name	Number	Pos.	Height	Year	Hometown	Reason for departure
Kyleigh Welsh	24	Forward	6'2"	(redshirt) Junior	Clearwater, FL	Entered transfer portal
Avery O'Roke	25	Guard	5'7"	Senior	Winchester, VA	Graduated
Olivia Kulyk	32	Guard	6'1"	Sophomore	Edinboro, PA	Transferred to Fordham
Alejandra Zuniga	34	Guard	5'6"	Senior	Madrid, Spain	Graduated

=== Incoming transfers ===
NJIT incoming transfers
Name	Number	Pos.	Height	Year	Hometown	Previous school
Matilde Baron	24	Guard	5'11"	Graduate Student	Vicenza, Italy	Southern New Hampshire (D-II)

=== Recruiting class ===
There was no 2026 recruiting class.

== Preseason ==
On September 28, 2026, the America East Conference released its preseason poll. NJIT was picked to finish sixth in the conference.

=== Preseason rankings ===
America East Preseason Poll
Place	Team	Votes
1	Binghamton	60 (6)
2	UMBC	57 (2)
3	Vermont	48 (1)
4	Maine	41
5	Bryant	40
6	NJIT	29
7	Albany	25
8	New Hampshire	16
9	UMass Lowell	8
(#) first-place votes

=== Preseason All-America East Team ===
No players were selected for the Preseason All-America East Team.

== Roster ==
2026–27 NJIT Highlanders women's basketball team
Players
Coaches

Pos.	#	Name	Height	Year	Previous school	Hometown
G	2	Kate Donovan	5 ft 6 in (1.68 m)	Fr	John Hersey High School	Arlington Heights, IL
G	3	Allison Cannon	5 ft 9 in (1.75 m)	Jr	Holmdel High School	Holmdel, NJ
F	4	Marina Bravo	6 ft 3 in (1.91 m)	Fr	Archbishop Riordan High School	Madrid, Spain
F	5	Audrey Kormann	6 ft 2 in (1.88 m)	Sr	Maple Grove Senior High School	Maple Grove, MN
G	8	Mia Gestosani	5 ft 8 in (1.73 m)	So	Mount St. Mary Academy	Somerset, NJ
G	10	Marissa Gingrich	5 ft 7 in (1.7 m)	Sr	Mifflin County High School	Mifflin County, PA
G	11	Addison Shen	6 ft 0 in (1.83 m)	So	Concord-Carlisle High School	Concord, MA
G	13	Piper Engelby	5 ft 11 in (1.8 m)	Jr	Andover High School	Andover, MN
G	15	Madilyn Dogs	6 ft 0 in (1.83 m)	Sr	Kewaskum High School	Kewaskum, WI
F	22	Lauren Lee	6 ft 2 in (1.88 m)	So	River Ridge High School	New Port Richey, FL
F	23	Mackenzie Wright-Rawls	6 ft 0 in (1.83 m)	Sr	Central York High School	York, PA
G	24	Matilde Baron	5 ft 11 in (1.8 m)	GS	Liceo Scientifico Tron; Southern New Hampshire	Vicenza, Italy
G	25	Carly Sweazie	5 ft 7 in (1.7 m)	Fr	Bishop O'Connell High School	Ashburn, VA
F	30	Olivia O'Meally	6 ft 1 in (1.85 m)	Jr	Niskayuna High School	Niskayuna, NY
F	45	Ava Locklear	5 ft 11 in (1.8 m)	Jr	Clear Creek Amana High School; Saginaw Valley State	Tiffin, IA

Head coach

- Mike Lane (Notre Dame)

Assistant coach(es)

- Colleen Moriarty (UMass Dartmouth)
- Payce Lange (Kean)
- John Hannafin (Springfield)

Legend

- (C) Team captain
- (S) Suspended
- (I) Ineligible
- (W) Walk-on
- Injured
- Current redshirt

Roster
Last update: September 16, 2026

== Schedule and results ==
Date time, TV	Rank^{#}	Opponent^{#}	Result	Record	High points	High rebounds	High assists	Site (attendance) city, state
Non-conference regular season
November 2, 2026*; 6:00 p.m., ESPN+		Rider	W 50–45	1–0	21 – Gingrich	12 – Dogs	1 – Tied	Wellness and Events Center (242); Newark, NJ
November 5, 2026*; TBA, ESPN+		Merrimack; AE–Metro Challenge						Wellness and Events Center; Newark, NJ
November 8, 2026*; 5:00 p.m.		at Marist; AE–Metro Challenge						McCann Arena; Poughkeepsie, NY
November 11, 2026*; TBA		at Lafayette						Kirby Sports Center; Easton, PA
November 14, 2026*; TBA		at Dartmouth						Leede Arena; Hanover, NH
November 18, 2026*; TBA, ESPN+		Delaware State						Wellness and Events Center; Newark, NJ
November 21, 2026*; TBA		at Marquette						Al McGuire Center; Milwaukee, WI
November 25, 2026*; 12:00 p.m.		at Saint Peter's						Run Baby Run Arena; Newark, NJ
December 2, 2026*; TBA, ESPN+		Monmouth						Wellness and Events Center; Newark, NJ
December 5, 2026*; TBA		at Manhattan						Draddy Gymnasium; Riverdale, NY
December 9, 2026*; TBA		at Fairleigh Dickinson						Bogota Savings Bank Center; Hackensack, NJ
December 13, 2026*; TBA, ESPN+		Sacred Heart						Wellness and Events Center; Newark, NJ
December 28, 2026*; TBA		at Drexel						Daskalakis Athletic Center; Philadelphia, PA
America East regular season
January 3, 2027; TBA, ESPN+		at UMBC						Chesapeake Employers Insurance Arena; Baltimore, MD
January 7, 2027; TBA, ESPN+		New Hampshire						Wellness and Events Center; Newark, NJ
January 9, 2027; TBA, ESPN+		Maine						Wellness and Events Center; Newark, NJ
January 14, 2027; TBA, ESPN+		at Albany						Broadview Center; Albany, NY
January 16, 2027; 2:00 p.m., ESPN+		at Binghamton						Dr. Bai Lee Court; Vestal, NY
January 21, 2027; TBA, ESPN+		Bryant						Wellness and Events Center; Newark, NJ
January 23, 2027; 2:00 p.m., ESPN+		at Vermont						Patrick Gym; Burlington, VT
January 30, 2027; TBA, ESPN+		at UMass Lowell						Kennedy Family Athletic Complex; Lowell, MA
February 4, 2027; TBA, ESPN+		Albany						Wellness and Events Center; Newark, NJ
February 6, 2027; TBA, ESPN+		Binghamton						Wellness and Events Center; Newark, NJ
February 11, 2027; TBA, ESPN+		at New Hampshire						Lundholm Gymnasium; Durham, NH
February 13, 2027; TBA, ESPN+		at Maine						Memorial Gymnasium; Orono, ME
February 18, 2027; TBA, ESPN+		UMass Lowell						Wellness and Events Center; Newark, NJ
February 20, 2027; TBA, ESPN+		Vermont; Senior Day						Wellness and Events Center; Newark, NJ
February 25, 2027; TBA, ESPN+		UMBC						Wellness and Events Center; Newark, NJ
February 27, 2027; TBA, ESPN+		at Bryant						Chace Athletic Center; Smithfield, RI
*Non-conference game. ^{#}Rankings from AP Poll. (#) Tournament seedings in parentheses. All times are in Eastern.
