= Colegio San José del Parque =

Catholic private school in Madrid, Spain

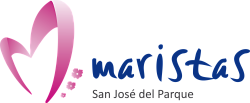

Colegio San José del Parque is a Catholic private school for boys and girls ages two to eighteen in Madrid, Spain. The school is run by the Marist Brothers.

San José del Parque is situated in north-eastern Madrid in the Parque Conde de Orgaz residential area. Its infrastructure includes a soccer pitch, seven tennis courts, six basketball courts, and an indoor swimming pool. The Colegio also has computer rooms, a drawing room, science and language labs, a library, a chapel, and an auditorium.

The Colegio has four groups of about 30 students per age. The Colegio offers the 2-year "Bachillerato de Ciencias y Tecnología" and "Bachillerato de Humanidades y Ciencias Sociales" as preparatory schools for Sciences & Technology and Social Sciences, respectively. In 2012, 90% of these students were presented at the PAU (university access tests), and 99% of them passed the tests.

The Colegio had the highest number of students making it through the first phase of the Math Olympiad of the Region of Madrid for six years in a row.

Catholic Religion is a compulsory course, and the Colegio offers further optional religious activities, such as retreats and Catholic youth groups, called "Grupos MarCha".
