= 2026–27 Albany Great Danes women's basketball team =

American college basketball season

2026–27 Albany Great Danes women's basketball
- Conference: America East Conference
- Record: 3–2 (0–0 AmEast)
- Head coach: Kelly Morrone (1st season)
- Assistant coaches: Victoria Lux; Denise King; Claudio Burrati; Philip Flory
- Home arena: Broadview Center

2026–27 America East Conference women's basketball standings
	Conf.				Overall
Team	W		L	PCT	W		L	PCT
Bryant	0	–	0	–	5	–	0	1.000
NJIT	0	–	0	–	4	–	1	.800
UMBC	0	–	0	–	4	–	1	.800
Maine	0	–	0	–	3	–	1	.750
Albany	0	–	0	–	3	–	2	.600
Binghamton	0	–	0	–	3	–	2	.600
New Hampshire	0	–	0	–	3	–	2	.600
Vermont	0	–	0	–	3	–	2	.600
UMass Lowell	0	–	0	–	2	–	3	.400
† 2027 America East tournament winner As of November 17, 2026

The 2026–27 Albany Great Danes women's basketball team currently represent the University at Albany, SUNY during the 2026–27 NCAA Division I women's basketball season. The Great Danes, led by first-year head coach Kelly Morrone, play their home games at the Broadview Center in Albany, New York, and compete as a member of the America East Conference.

== Previous season ==
The Great Danes finished the 2025–26 season 14–16 overall and 4–12 in America East play, finishing in a tie for seventh in the conference with New Hampshire. As the No. 8 seed in the America East tournament, they lost 40–55 in the quarterfinals to top-seeded and defending champions Vermont to end their season.

On March 29, it was announced by the university that head coach Colleen Mullen had stepped down after eight seasons with the program in order to take a head coaching job for Rhode Island. Six days later, on April 4, the program announced the hiring of Merrimack head coach Kelly Morrone to take over the team. Morrone spent six years with the Warriors after first joining the team in 2020, leading them to a 19–13 record in the past season.

== Offseason ==
=== Departures ===
Albany departures
Name	Num.	Pos.	Height	Year	Hometown	Reason for departure
Bella Stuart	1	Forward	5'11"	Graduate student	Clifton Park, NY	Graduated
Nila Giraud	2	Forward	6'0"	Freshman	Rahway, NJ	Transferred to Siena
Anaïs Levasseur	7	Guard	5'8"	Freshman	Quebec City, Quebec	Transferred to Rhode Island
Amaya Stewart	9	Forward	6'1"	Freshman	West Reading, PA	Transferred to Rhode Island
Laura Vera	10	Guard	5'11"	Freshman	Estepona, Spain	Transferred to New Haven
Emma Hákonardóttir	12	Guard	5'11"	Sophomore	Þorlákshöfn, Iceland	Transferred to Binghamton
Martina Borrellas	13	Guard	6'1"	Sophomore	Barcelona, Spain	Transferred to Rhode Island
Gabriela Falcão	21	Center	6'1"	Senior	Figueira da Foz, Portugal	Graduated
Delanie Hill	33	Guard	5'7"	Sophomore	Charlotte, NC	Transferred to Rhode Island
Júlia Palomo Vicente	35	Guard	5'7"	Graduate student	La Seu d'Urgell, Spain	Graduated

=== Incoming transfers ===
Albany incoming transfers
Name	Num.	Pos.	Height	Year	Hometown	Previous school
Madison Roman	0	Forward	6'0"	Senior	Fairfield, CT	Merrimack
Daria Shishkina	2	Guard	5'11"	Junior	Moscow, Russia	Merrimack
Shyla Montgomery	3	Guard	5'7"	Graduate student	Brockton, MA	Daemen (D-II)
Kohen Marshall	10	Guard	5'8"	Junior	Murrieta, CA	Mt. San Jacinto College (NJCAA)
Sabela Carro	14	Guard/Forward	5'10"	Junior	A Coruña, Spain	Laramie County CC (NJCAA)
Cadence Johnson	21	Forward	6'0"	(redshirt) Junior	Mattapoisett, MA	Merrimack

=== Recruiting class ===
There was no 2026 recruiting class.

== Preseason ==
On September 28, 2026, the America East Conference released its preseason poll. Albany was picked to finish seventh in the conference.

=== Preseason rankings ===
America East Preseason Poll
Place	Team	Votes
1	Binghamton	60 (6)
2	UMBC	57 (2)
3	Vermont	48 (1)
4	Maine	41
5	Bryant	40
6	NJIT	29
7	Albany	25
8	New Hampshire	16
9	UMass Lowell	8
(#) first-place votes

=== Preseason All-America East Team ===
No players were selected for the Preseason All-America East Team.

== Roster ==
2026–27 Albany Great Danes women's basketball team
Players
Coaches

Pos.	#	Name	Height	Year	Previous school	Hometown
F	0	Madison Roman	6 ft 0 in (1.83 m)	Sr	Fairfield Ludlowe High School; Merrimack	Fairfield, CT
G	2	Daria Shishkina	5 ft 11 in (1.8 m)	Jr	SPIRE Academy; Merrimack	Moscow, Russia
G	3	Shyla Montgomery	5 ft 7 in (1.7 m)	GS	Lawrence Academy; Daemen	Brockton, MA
G	7	Frankie McLain	5 ft 11 in (1.8 m)	Fr	SPIRE Academy	Pleasant Prairie, WI
G	9	Alexia Bujold	5 ft 9 in (1.75 m)	Fr	Cégep Saint-Jean-sur-Richelieu	Saint-Jean-sur-Richelieu, Quebec
G	10	Kohen Marshall	5 ft 8 in (1.73 m)	Jr	Vista Murrieta High School; Mt. San Jacinto College	Murrieta, CA
G	12	Sofia Caraus	5 ft 9 in (1.75 m)	Fr	Virginia Academy	Centreville, VA
G/F	14	Sabela Carro	5 ft 10 in (1.78 m)	Jr	ÍES Lucus Augusti; Laramie County CC	A Coruña, Spain
G	15	Noa López Tallón	5 ft 6 in (1.68 m)	Fr	ÍES Xograr Afonso Gómez	Lugo, Spain
F	21	Cadence Johnson	6 ft 0 in (1.83 m)	RS Jr	St. Andrew's School; Merrimack	Mattapoisett, MA
G	23	Jeneva Egan	6 ft 0 in (1.83 m)	Fr	The Newman School	North Attleboro, MA
G	24	Abriyah Cunningham	6 ft 0 in (1.83 m)	Fr	Liverpool High School	Syracuse, NY
F	46	Emma Zuccon	6 ft 0 in (1.83 m)	So	Istituto Bruno-Franchetti	Treviso, Italy
G	55	Lara Langermann	5 ft 7 in (1.7 m)	Sr	Theodor-Heuss-Gymnasium; New Mexico	Breckerfeld, Germany

Head coach

- Kelly Morrone (South Carolina)

Assistant coach(es)

- Victoria Lux (Bentley)
- Denise King (Rhode Island)
- Claudio Buratti (John Cabot)
- Philip Flory (Albany)

Legend

- (C) Team captain
- (S) Suspended
- (I) Ineligible
- (W) Walk-on
- Injured
- Current redshirt

Roster
Last update: September 26, 2026

== Schedule and results ==
Date time, TV	Rank^{#}	Opponent^{#}	Result	Record	High points	High rebounds	High assists	Site (attendance) city, state
Exhibition
October 29, 2026*; 6:30 p.m.		St. Thomas Aquinas	W 72–53		–	–	–	Broadview Center; Albany, NY
Non-conference regular season
November 2, 2026*; 7:00 p.m., FloCollege		at Northeastern	W 65–61	1–0	19 – Tied	8 – Roman	7 – Langermann	Cabot Center (312); Boston, MA
November 5, 2026*; 6:30 p.m., ESPN+		Manhattan; AE–Metro Challenge	W 62–61	2–0	16 – Roman	16 – Roman	3 – Montgomery	Broadview Center (1,117); Albany, NY
November 8, 2026*; 2:00 p.m., ESPN+		at Mount St. Mary's; AE–Metro Challenge	W 77–57	3–0	17 – Tied	11 – Bujold	5 – Roman	Knott Arena (511); Emmitsburg, MD
November 11, 2026*; 7:00 p.m., SECN+		at No. 21 Ole Miss	L 41–95	3–1	12 – Roman	6 – Bujold	3 – López Tallón	SJB Pavilion (2,305); Oxford, MS
November 16, 2026*; 7:00 p.m., B1G+		at Rutgers	L 44–83	3–2	11 – Tied	12 – Roman	4 – Langermann	Jersey Mike's Arena (1,584); Piscataway, NJ
November 18, 2026*; TBA		Bucknell						Broadview Center; Albany, NY
November 21, 2026*; TBA		Cornell						Broadview Center; Albany, NY
November 25, 2026*; TBA		Union College						Broadview Center; Albany, NY
November 29, 2026*; TBA		Stonehill						Broadview Center; Albany, NY
December 5, 2026*; 2:00 p.m.		at Siena; Rivalry						UHY Center; Loudonville, NY
December 8, 2026*; TBA		Colgate						Broadview Center; Albany, NY
December 12, 2026*; TBA		at Hofstra						Mack Sports Complex; Hempstead, NY
December 16, 2026*; TBA		at South Carolina						Colonial Life Arena; Columbia, SC
December 19, 2026*; TBA		St. Bonaventure						Broadview Center; Albany, NY
December 21, 2026*; TBA		at UMass						Mullins Center; Amherst, MA
America East regular season
December 31, 2026; TBA		at UMass Lowell						Kennedy Family Athletic Complex; Lowell, MA
January 7, 2027; TBA		at Bryant						Chace Athletic Center; Smithfield, RI
January 10, 2027; TBA		Binghamton						Broadview Center; Albany, NY
January 14, 2027; TBA		NJIT						Broadview Center; Albany, NY
January 16, 2027; TBA		UMBC						Broadview Center; Albany, NY
January 21, 2027; TBA		at New Hampshire						Lundholm Gymnasium; Durham, NH
January 23, 2027; TBA		at Maine						Memorial Gymnasium; Orono, ME
January 28, 2027; TBA		UMass Lowell						Broadview Center; Albany, NY
January 30, 2027; TBA		Vermont						Broadview Center; Albany, NY
February 4, 2027; TBA		at NJIT						Wellness and Events Center; Newark, NJ
February 6, 2027; TBA		at UMBC						Chesapeake Employers Insurance Arena; Baltimore, MD
February 11, 2027; TBA		Bryant						Broadview Center; Albany, NY
February 13, 2027; TBA		at Vermont						Patrick Gym; Burlington, VT
February 18, 2027; TBA		at Binghamton						Dr. Bai Lee Court; Vestal, NY
February 25, 2027; TBA		New Hampshire						Broadview Center; Albany, NY
February 27, 2027; TBA		Maine						Broadview Center; Albany, NY
*Non-conference game. ^{#}Rankings from AP Poll. (#) Tournament seedings in parentheses. All times are in Eastern.
