= Liu (disambiguation) =

Liu (劉 / 刘) is a common Chinese surname.

Liu, LIU, or liu may also refer to:

== Names ==
=== Chinese surnames ===
- Liǔ (柳), a Chinese surname
- Liu, the Cantonese romanisation of the Chinese surname Liao

=== Fictional characters ===
- Liù, the slave girl in Turandot
- Liu (Centuria), fictional assassin in the Japanese web manga Centuria

== Universities ==
- Laureate International Universities
- Lebanese International University, Lebanon
- Linköping University, Sweden
- Long Island University, New York, United States

== Other uses ==
- Liu (country), a state during the Zhou Dynasty of ancient China
- Liu, Estonia, a village in Pärnu County, Estonia
- Lughat il-Ishaarah il-Urduniah, the Jordanian name for Levantine Arabic Sign Language or Syro-Jordanian Sign Language
- Liǔ (柳) or Willow, a Chinese constellation
