= 2014–15 UConn Huskies women's basketball team =

Intercollegiate basketball season

2014–15 UConn Huskies women's basketball

NCAA tournament National Champions AAC Tournament champions AAC regular season champions Gulf Coast Showcase champions
- Conference: American Athletic Conference

Ranking
- Coaches: No. 1
- AP: No. 1
- Record: 38–1 (18–0 The American)
- Head coach: Geno Auriemma (30th season)
- Associate head coach: Chris Dailey
- Assistant coaches: Shea Ralph; Marisa Moseley
- Home arena: Harry A. Gampel Pavilion; XL Center

2014–15 American Athletic Conference women's basketball standings
	Conf.				Overall
Team	W		L	PCT	W		L	PCT
No. 1 UConn †	18	–	0	1.000	38	–	1	.974
No. 25 South Florida	15	–	3	.833	27	–	8	.771
Tulsa	12	–	6	.667	18	–	14	.563
Temple	12	–	6	.667	20	–	17	.541
East Carolina	11	–	7	.611	22	–	11	.667
Tulane	11	–	7	.611	22	–	11	.667
Memphis	7	–	11	.389	14	–	17	.452
UCF	5	–	13	.278	9	–	21	.300
Cincinnati	4	–	14	.222	8	–	23	.258
SMU	3	–	15	.167	7	–	23	.233
Houston	1	–	17	.056	6	–	24	.200
† American Tournament winner winner As of 7 April 2015; Rankings from AP poll

The 2014–15 UConn Huskies women's basketball team represented the University of Connecticut (UConn) in the 2014–15 NCAA Division I basketball season. The Huskies, led by thirtieth-year head coach Geno Auriemma, played their home games at the Harry A. Gampel Pavilion in Storrs, Connecticut. The Huskies defeated the Notre Dame Fighting Irish to win their third consecutive NCAA championship.

This was UConn's second season as a member of the American Athletic Conference, known as The American or AAC. The Huskies entered the season as the two-time defending national champions. The 2014–15 Huskies repeated last year's success in The American by winning the regular season championship outright. They placed an 18–0 record in the 2014–15 regular season and a 3–0 record in the 2014–15 AAC Tournament. They are a combined 42–0 (including AAC tournament wins) over two years in the conference. The closest game between the Huskies and another AAC opponent over the last two years was this year's AAC tournament championship between #1 seed UConn and #2 seed South Florida. UConn won 84–70 to win its second straight AAC tournament championship.

== Media ==
Every single Connecticut game was expected to be televised. Excluding exhibitions, every Connecticut home game and most conference games aired on SNY with a simulcast on Husky Vision. Select games aired on ESPN3, another ESPN Network, or CBS Sports Network. Every game was once again broadcast on the UConn IMG Sports Network with an extra audio broadcast being available online to listen to through Husky Vision.

== Off-season ==
=== FIBA ===
Connecticut basketball players, past present and future, were active in FIBA events during 2014. Katie Lou Samuelson has a verbal commitment to Connecticut, and played on two USA squads over the summer. In June, she played for the USA under 17 team which competed in the 2014 FIBA U17 World Championship For Women. The official events were held in Klatovy and Plzeň, Czech Republic, although some friendlies were played in Nogent-sur-Seine, France. Samuelson helped the team to a 7–0 record to win the gold medal, and earned a spot on the all-tournament team.

Samuelson, along with future Huskies teammates De'janae Boykin and Napheesa Collier, made up three of the four players on the U18 3x3 team invited to play at the Youth Olympic Games, held in Nanjing, China 16–28 August 2014. Samuelson had turned an ankle, and was unable to play in some games, forcing her three teammates to play without substitution in some games. Despite the challenge the team won all nine matches to finish with a perfect record and the gold medal for the event. Samuelson competed in the shoot out event, one of the individuals skills competition, placing third out of 158 contestants to win the bronze medal.

Collier was one of the twelve players selected to play on the USA team invited to play at the 2014 FIBA Americas U18 Championship held in Colorado Springs, Colorado, from August 6 to 10. In the game against the undefeated team from Canada, Collier was the leading scorer, recording a double-double with 22 points and 10 rebounds. The team went on to win all five games, earning the gold medal for the event, and an automatic bid to the U18 Championships in 2015, scheduled to be held in Russia.

Kia Nurse played on the Canadian national team in the 2014 FIBA World Championship. The team lost to Australia in the quarterfinals, then beat France and China to finish in fifth place. Nurse averaged almost 22 minutes per game at the point guard position, averaging almost seven points per games, fourth most on the roster, while being the youngest player on the roster.

The United States women's national basketball team participated in the 2014 FIBA World Championship in Turkey. Auriemma served as the head coach of the team, which won all six games to win the World Championship and the gold medal. Current and former UConn players on the team included:

- Breanna Stewart
- Sue Bird
- Diana Taurasi
- Tina Charles
- Maya Moore

Moore was named the MVP of the tournament.

=== Roster changes ===
Stefanie Dolson and Bria Hartley were selected in the first round of the draft in consecutive picks. Dolson was chosen 6th, by the Washington Mystics. Hartley was the next player chosen, initially by the Seattle Storm, but traded an hour later to Washington, so the teammates continue to be teammates.

Briana Banks chose to transfer to Penn State University, where she will have one year of eligibility remaining.

The team has four incoming freshman and one incoming transfer. Natalie Butler is a 6' 5" center from Virginia who played for Georgetown last season before deciding to transfer to Connecticut. Per NCAA rules she will have to sit out one season, and will be eligible to play in the 2015–16 season. Sadie Edwards is from Meriden Connecticut and played one year in Middletown Connecticut before transferring to Blair Academy in New Jersey, although in early December, she chose to leave the team, with plans to transfer to another school. Courtney Ekmark is from Phoenix Arizona, although played for nationally ranked St. Mary's in California, winning three state titles and one national championship. Her family moved to Arizona, and she completed her last year of school as a home schooled student. Kia Nurse is from Hamilton, Ontario, and earned a spot on the national team of Canada. She will be playing against her future coach when the USA National team plays an exhibition game against the Canadian National team in Bridgeport, Connecticut. Connecticut's Geno Auriemma is the head coach of the USA national team. Gabby Williams is from Sparks, Nevada, and is a track star as well as a basketball player. She finished fifth in the 2012 U.S. Olympic trials for the high jump at the age of 15, although she is planning to concentrate on basketball rather than track in college. The incoming class of freshman was ranked fourth by ESPN.

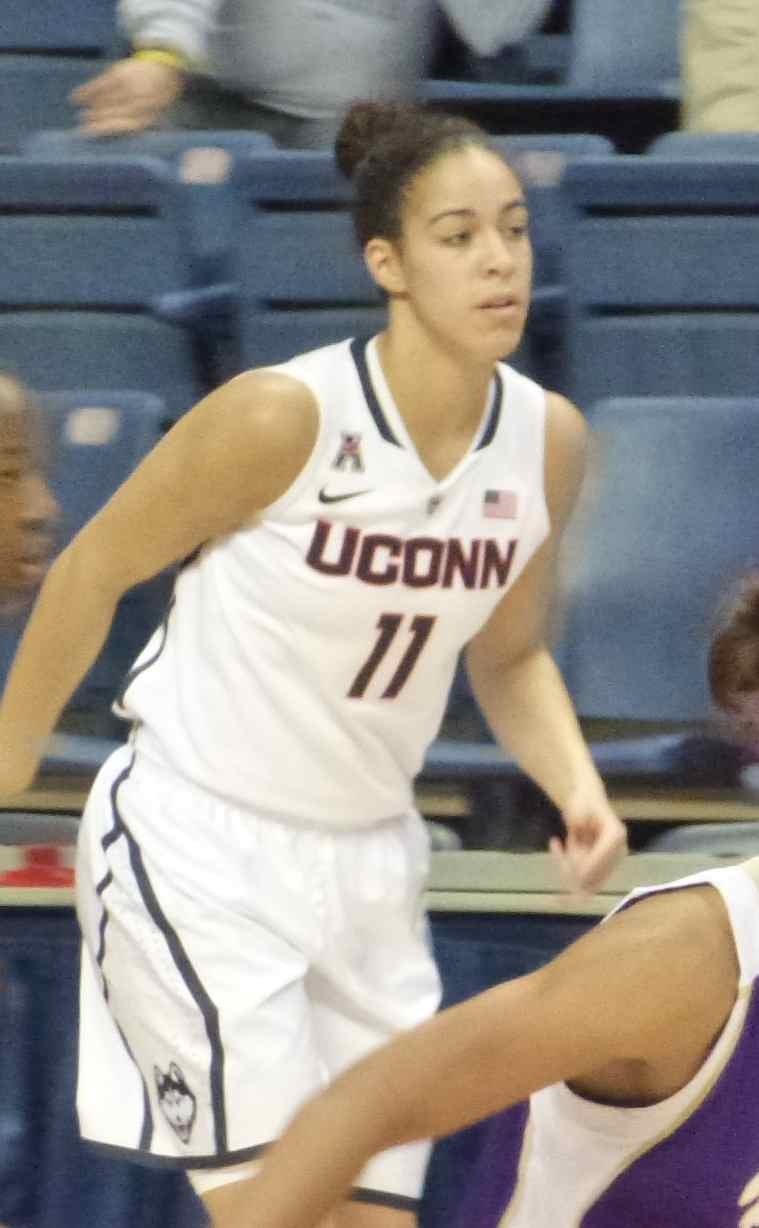
Kia Nurse

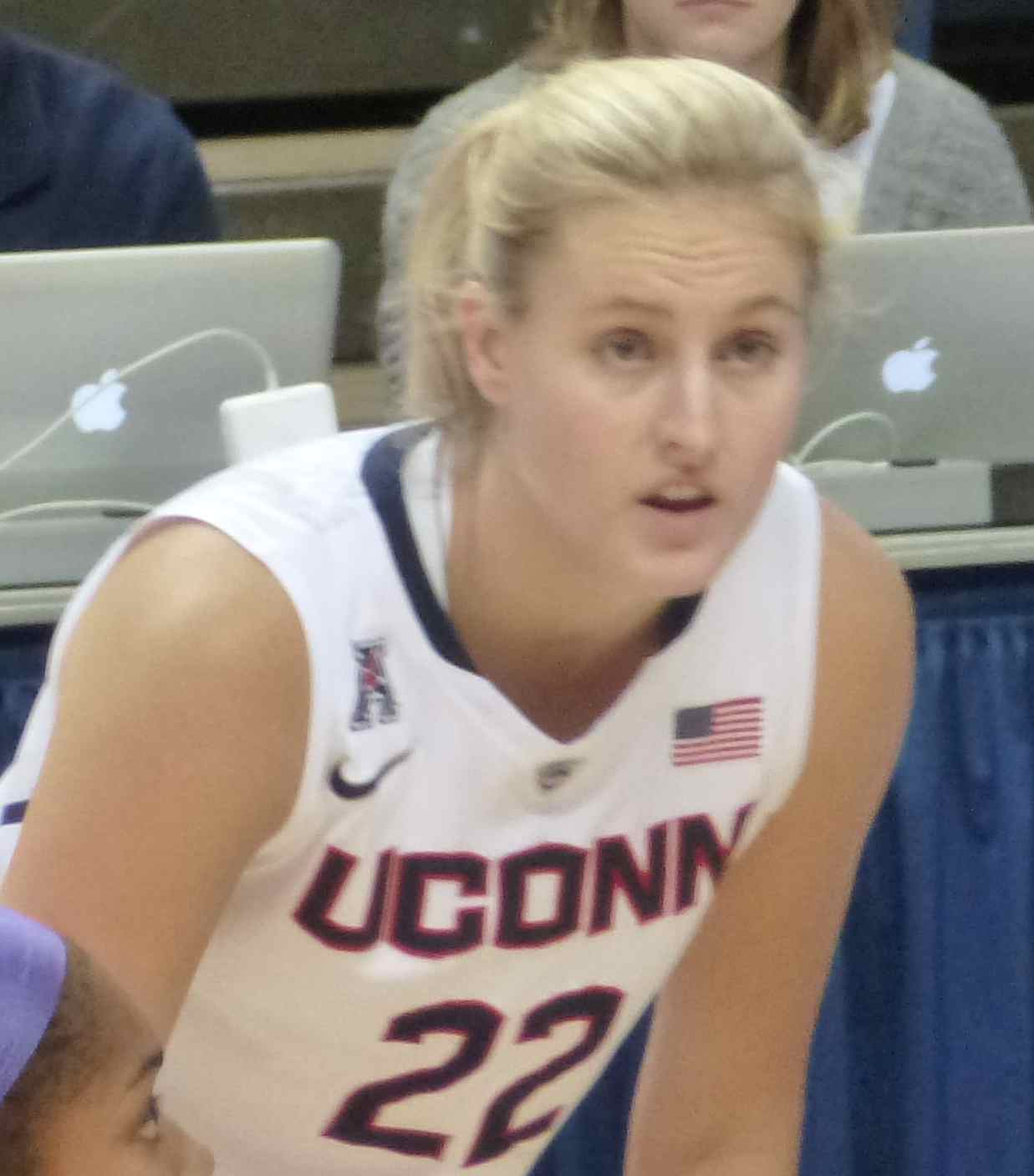
Courtney Ekmark

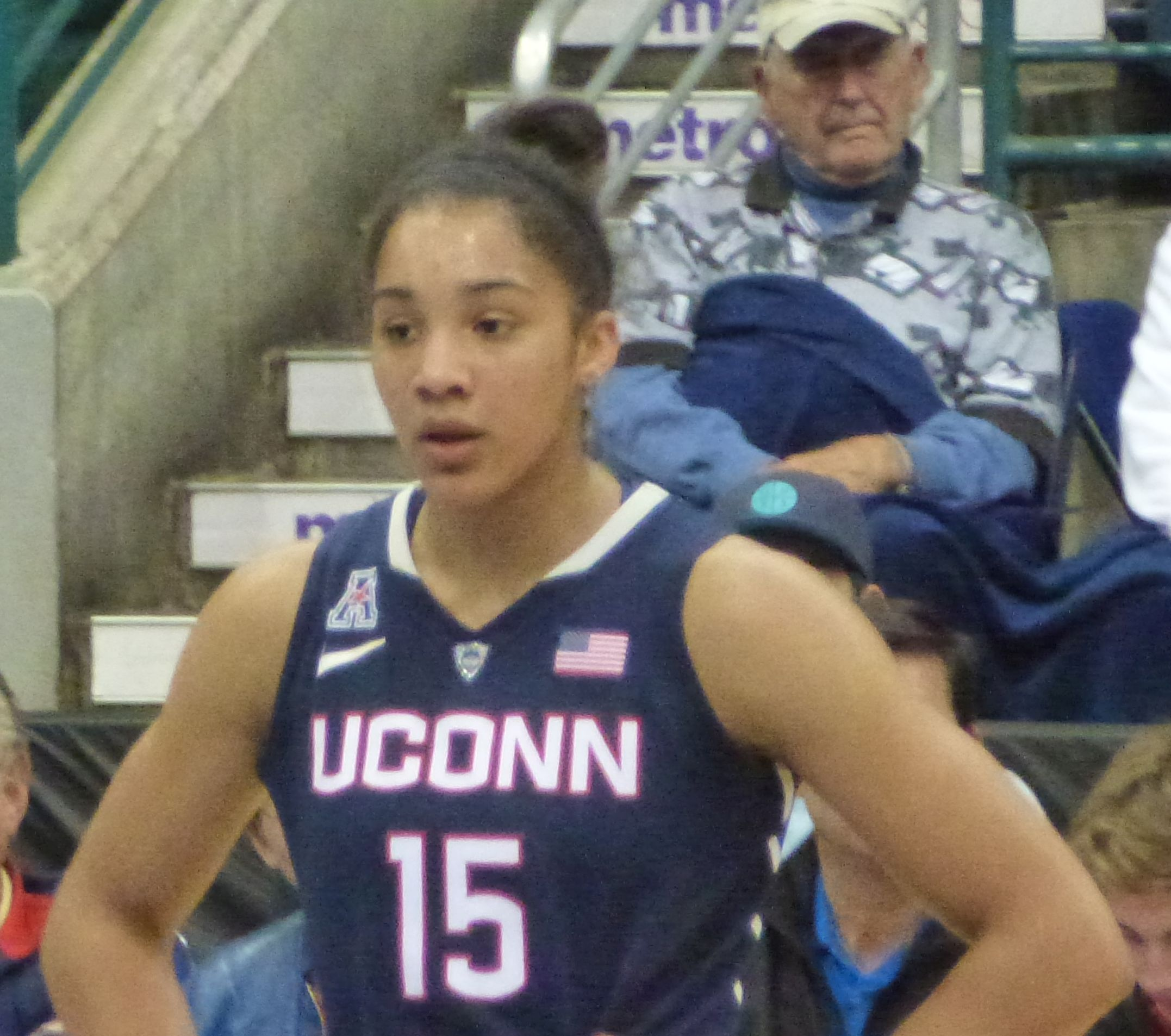
Gabby Williams

== Roster ==
2014–15 Connecticut Huskies women's basketball team
Players
Coaches

Pos.	#	Name	Height	Year	Hometown
C	51	Natalie Butler (redshirt)	6 ft 5 in (1.96 m)	RS So	Fairfax Station, Va.
G	12	Saniya Chong	5 ft 8 in (1.73 m)	So	Ossining, N.Y.
G	22	Courtney Ekmark	6 ft 0 in (1.83 m)	Fr	Phoenix, Ariz.
G	4	Moriah Jefferson	5 ft 7 in (1.7 m)	Jr	Glenn Heights, Texas
G	20	Tierney Lawlor	5 ft 7 in (1.7 m)	So	Ansonia, Conn.
F	23	Kaleena Mosqueda-Lewis	5 ft 11 in (1.8 m)	Sr	Anaheim Hills, Calif.
G	11	Kia Nurse	6 ft 0 in (1.83 m)	Fr	Hamilton, Ontario
G	24	Briana Pulido	5 ft 7.5 in (1.71 m)	Jr	Miami, Florida
F	30	Breanna Stewart	6 ft 4 in (1.93 m)	Jr	North Syracuse, N.Y.
C	41	Kiah Stokes	6 ft 3 in (1.91 m)	Sr	Marion, Iowa
F	3	Morgan Tuck	6 ft 2 in (1.88 m)	Jr	Bolingbrook, Ill.
G	15	Gabby Williams	5 ft 11 in (1.8 m)	Fr	Sparks, Nev.

Head coach

- Geno Auriemma (West Chester)

Assistant coach(es)

- Chris Dailey (St. Peter's)
- Shea Ralph (Connecticut)
- Marisa Moseley (Boston University)

Legend

- (C) Team captain
- (S) Suspended
- (I) Ineligible
- (W) Walk-on
- Injured
- Current redshirt

Roster
Last update: 2014-09-07

== Games ==
=== Exhibition games ===
==== West Chester University ====
UConn opened their season with an exhibition game against West Chester University, the alma mater of head coach Geno Auriemma. All twelve players received playing time, and all twelve scored. None played more than 26 minutes, as all got a chance to play against someone other than their teammates in months. All five starters scored in double digits, as well as freshman Kia Nurse, who scored 12 points. Kiah Stokes recorded seven blocks in addition to 13 points. The Huskies hit all but two of their first fifteen field goal attempts to open up a 40–10 lead. The final score reflected the mismatch in talent, with UConn winning 115–26.

==== Post University ====
The second exhibition game was played against Division II Post University. Last year's player of the year Stewart scored 27 points to lead the scoring for the Huskies, one of five players with double-digit scoring. Stokes had a double-double with 15 points and 14 rebounds, while Tuck came off the bench to record her own double-double, with 22 points and 15 rebounds. The tone of the game was set early: UConn scored the first nine points, then after giving up one basket, scored 15 straight. The final score, in favor of the Huskies, was 114–44.

=== Regular season games ===
==== UC Davis ====
For the first time in 15 years, the Huskies opened their season on the road, playing their first game in California, the home state of Mosqueda-Lewis. The arena set an all-time record for attendance at a women's basketball game. Mosqueda-Lewis had 25 friends and family members in the stands, who came to cheer her on. She gave them plenty to cheer about, tying the school record for three-pointers made in a game with Maya Moore. Both hit ten three-pointers. The Huskies hit their first four shots of the game, all three-pointers, but UC Davis hung in there for some time, until the Huskies started a long run. They scored the final 23 points of the first half, and continued with the first 16 points of the second half, to complete a 39–0 run, believed to be one of the longest in NCAA history. Mosqueda-Lewis went to the bench for the final 11:31 after tying the record.

==== Stanford ====
UConn's second trip on the west coast trip was against Stanford, the number six team in the country. Stanford had snapped UConn's 90 game winning streak, the longest in NCAA history, in 2010. The Huskies were bringing in a 47-game winning streak to this contest. However, after tying a UConn record days earlier, Mosqueda-Lewis did not score for the first three-quarters of the game. Despite this, UConn built a ten-point lead with under seven minutes to go, but gave it up, allowing Amber Orrange to hit a three-pointer with 1.4 seconds to go in the game to send the game to overtime. Tuck and Nurse fouled out, and the Cardinals outscored the Huskies in the overtime period to take the win 88–86, and hence end the winning streak.

==== Creighton ====
The loss to Stanford brought back interest in one of the more unusual streaks in sports—the number of games since the team lost back-to-back games. The last time UConn lost back to back games was on the 7th and 17th of March 1993.

Mosqueda-Lewis was out with the flu, so Morgan Tuck started in her place. Freshman Kia Nurse had been playing so well that she earned her first start. Nurse delivered, hitting six of seven field goal attempts, including all four three-point attempts, and ended with 22 points. Tuck also did well, with 15 points and seven rebounds.

It was the first home game for the Huskies, so the players were presented with their National Championship rings in a brief ceremony before the game. As well as Nurse and Tuck played, Stewart still out-did them, going ten for ten from the field, only one basket removed from an 11 for 11 performance by Rebecca Lobo in 1994. Connecticut won 96–60, extending the streak without back-to-back losses to 775.

==== College of Charleston ====
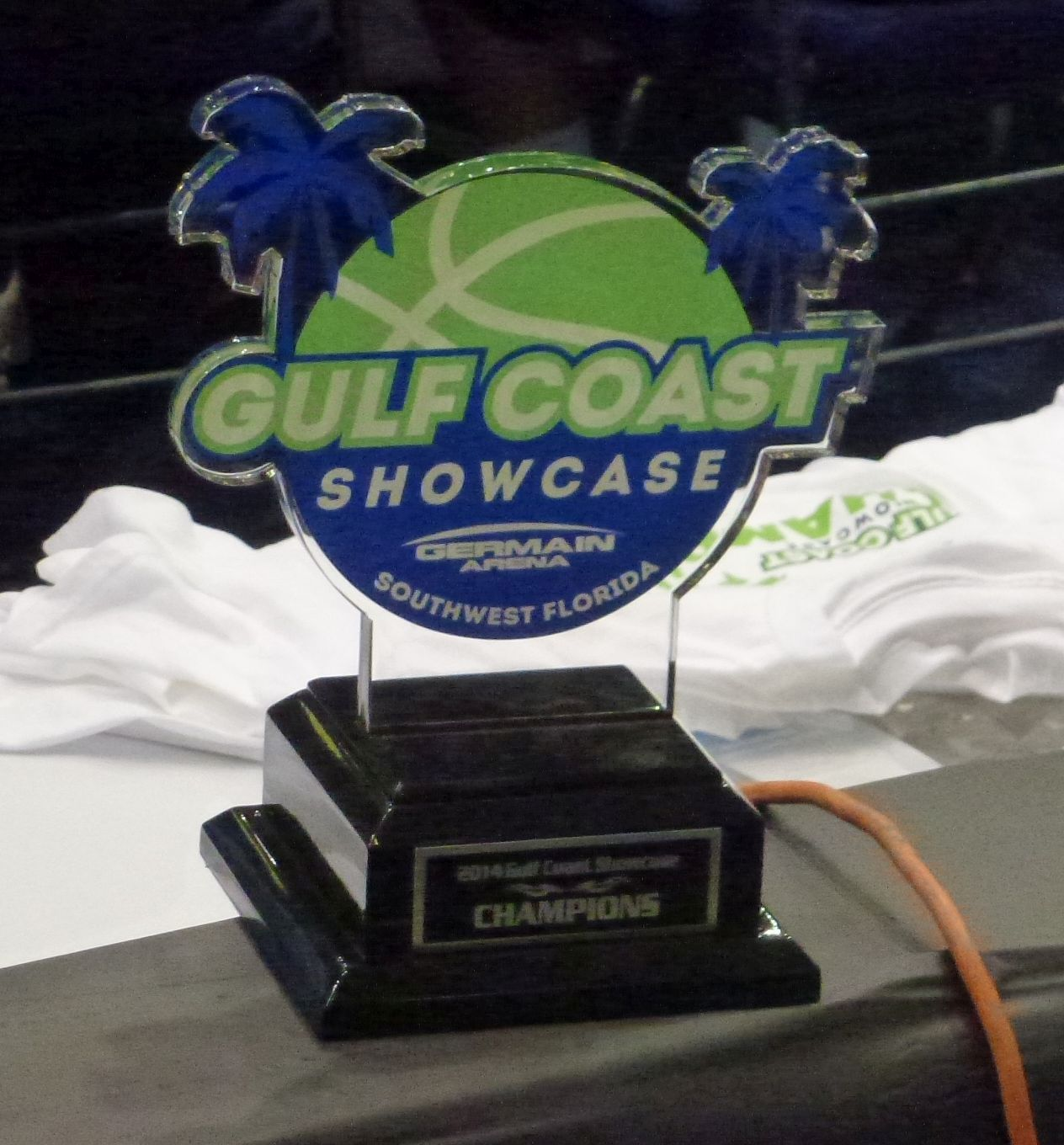
Gulf Coast Showcase Championship trophy 2014

Connecticut traveled to Florida, to take part in the Gulf Coast Showcase Tournament. Mosqueda-Lewis returned to the starting line-up. Tuck stayed in the starting group, replacing Stokes, while Nurse also remained as a starter. Connecticut scored eight points before Charleston managed to score, and the game was never close. The Huskies held a 50–13 lead at halftime, then held Charleston scoreless for six and a half minutes in the second half.

The final score was 85–24, with Mosqueda-Lewis leading the scoring with 21 points.

==== Vanderbilt ====
Saddled with early fouls, the Huskies needed to look for offence beyond reigning national player of the year Stewart, and once again Nurse and Tuck stepped up, each scoring 16 points, and probably securing their position in the starting line-up. All five starters scored in double digits, as UConn pulled out to a 53–27 lead at halftime, and coasted to a 91–52 win. The win set up a match with the other semi-final winner, Green Bay.

==== Green Bay ====
The Green Bay Phoenix were not in awe of the Huskies as they opened up a 9–3 lead early in the game. UConn responded with a 10–0 run, but Green Bay refused to wilt, and tied the game at 26 points each. The Huskies went on an 11–0 run, and went to halftime with an eleven points, lead, but it wasn't until the opening of the second half, starting with a UConn 14–2 run, that the result seemed assured. Five UConn players reached double digits in scoring. Jefferson was the scoring leader with 19. Stewart followed with 17. Connecticut won 89–53, to win the tournament championship.

Nurse's 16 points, coupled with her results in the first two games, were enough to earn her the Most Valuable Player of the Gulf Coast Showcase Tournament.

==== Notre Dame ====
Notre Dame and Jewell Loyd were unstoppable for the first ten minutes of the game, building to a 28–18 lead on perfect, six for six shooting from Loyd. Then they were stopped, as UConn went on a 22–4 run to take an eight-point halftime lead. The Irish missed 18 of 19 shots during one stretch. Tuck provided much of the offense, scoring a career-high 25 points, along with nine rebounds. Stokes was a defensive presence, with 18 rebounds. Kiah would stay for the second game to watch her brother, Darius, play in a men's game between Notre Dame and Fairleigh Dickenson. UConn won 76–58, ending Notre Dame's home winning streak of 34 games, at the time, the longest active streak in the country.

The Huskies would meet them again in the national title game in Tampa, Florida.

==== DePaul ====
UConn ended an almost two-week hiatus with a game against 25th ranked DePaul in Bridgeport CT. The rust was evident early, as DePaul hit early shots and held even with the Huskies. Almost eight minutes into the game, the score was tied at 24 points for each team. Then UConn, led by Stewart, opened up a 20-point lead. DePaul's Hrnko had 17 points, but was more than matched by Stewart's 25 points along with double-digit scoring by Nurse, Tuck, Mosqueda-Lewis and Williams. Stokes had three of the team's five blocks. The Huskies went on to win 98–68.

==== UCLA ====
UConn played another "home" game, this time at the Mohegan Sun Arena against UCLA. The Bruins clung to a slim 4–2 lead at the first media timeout, but Nurse and Stewart then went to work, opening up a ten-point lead, which expanded to 20 before settling back to a 15-point halftime lead. UCLA played even with UConn for the opening of the second half, but then the Huskies got going again and won 86–50. Kiah Stokes's father, Greg Stokes told his daughter he scrapped his Christmas list and all he wanted was a double-double. Kiah scored ten points and recorded her tenth rebound with a minute to go to give her father his Christmas gift.

==== SMU (home) ====
UConn played the conference opener against Southern Methodist University, but the story was more about other issues than the game result, which was won easily by the Huskies 96–45. Jefferson had been struggling in recent games, with only 11 games in the prior three games, and ended with a career-high 24 points. Mosqueda-Lewis hit three three-pointers to reach a career total of 311, tying her with Maya Moore for second place among UConn players. The win improved coach Auriemma's lifetime record to 888–134 for a winning percentage of 86.888% moving him ahead of second place Leon Barmore, whose winning percentage had been the best in Division I women's basketball at 86.878%

==== Duke ====
In the prior seven games between Duke and UConn, the Huskies had won by almost 29 points per game. When they met on 29 December, the Blue Devils had a two-point lead 13 minutes into the game, and while the Huskies went on a run to take a lead, the halftime margin was only seven points. A win would still be a challenge, but surely it would not be a blowout. However, the Huskies pulled away in the second half, and ended up with a 31-point victory, 83–52. The teams have played each other since 2010, but Duke declined to renew the contract. Jefferson led the Huskies with 18 points, while the other four starters all scored in double digits.

==== East Carolina (away) ====
UConn played its first conference road game on New Year's Eve against East Carolina. The Huskies had a number of turnovers, and other miscues promoting Coach Auriemma to declare at halftime that in 30 years of coaching, he had never seen a worse half of basketball by his team. UConn led by 23 points at the time. The team responded in the second half, scoring 15 consecutive points to start the half. Ekmark played in the second half, her first time on the court since a stress reaction in November. UConn went on to rout them 89–23.

==== St. John's ====
On the first Sunday of the New Year, the Huskies participated in the Maggie Dixon Classic, played in Madison Square Garden as a memorial to Maggie Dixon the former head coach of the Army women's basketball team. This was the ninth such event; the first was held at Christl Arena, Army's arena, while the last eight have been played in Madison Square Garden. This is the fourth time that Connecticut has been a participant.

The event is usually a double-header, typically involving Division I teams. However, because 2015 is the 40th anniversary of the first women's basketball game to be played in Madison Square Garden, the original participants made up the opening game. Division II's Queens College took on Division III's Immaculata University in a rematch of a game played on 22 February 1975. The original game was won 65–61 by Immaculata. The rematch was won by Queens 76–60.

In the second game, UConn faced St. John's. Tuck had 23 points, Stewart had 18 and Jefferson scored 16 in a 70–54 victory over the Red Storm.

==== Tulsa (home) ====
The most noteworthy event in the game against Tulsa was not the score or the outcome, but a three-point shot by Mosqueda-Lewis, which tied her with Diana Taurasi for the most three-pointers in a UConn career. She hit her 318th three early in the second half. Jefferson continued her hot shooting with eight for nine from the field, finishing with 22 points, and Tuck was close behind with 21. Nurse and Williams each added 15 points, while Stokes continued her penchant for blocks with seven. Ekmark hit her first three-pointer of her career.

==== SMU (away) ====
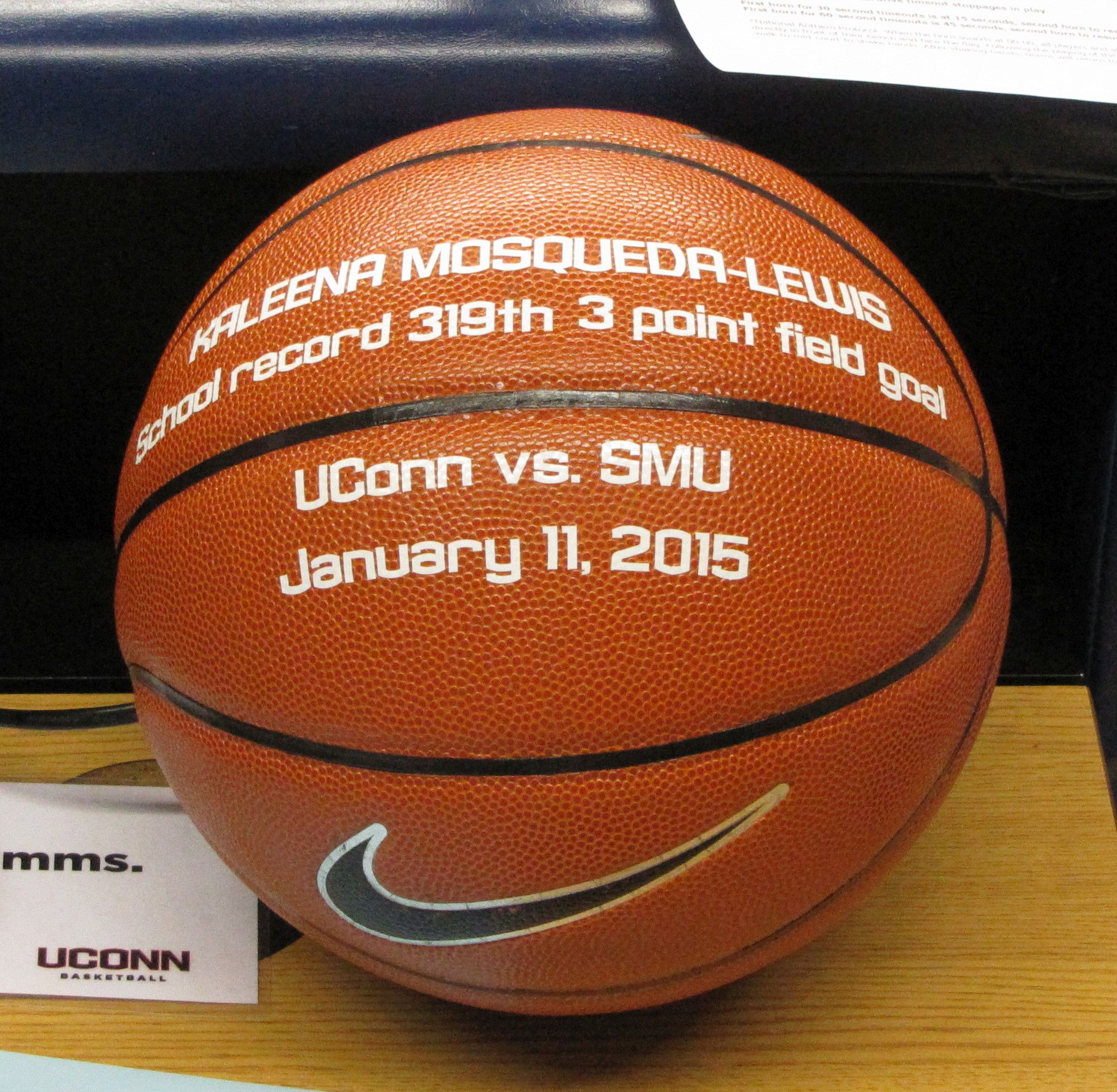
Kaleena Mosqueda-Lewis record setting game ball vs. SMU. 11 Jan 2015

The outcome of the game wasn't the main story. Early in the first half, Mosqueda-Lewis hit a three-pointer, something she has accomplished many times in the past. In fact, it was the 319th time in her UConn career that she has hit a three-pointer, and that placed her in first place among all UConn players. A few days earlier, she tied then went ahead of Maya Moore. Recently she tied, and now has pulled ahead of Diana Taurasi previously the holder of the record for three-pointers by a UConn women's basketball player. The game ball was presented to her at the next home game. In addition to setting the record, the UConn team defeated SMU by a score of 87–28.

==== Temple (home) ====
The game against Temple was not as lopsided at the game against SMU, but it was never a contest. UConn scored 36 points in the paint before the Owls scored their first two in the paint. The Huskies had 55 points at halftime, and would need only three more to match the Temple score. It was another strong game for Tuck, who had 20 points in the first half. She played limited minutes in the second half due to the large lead. The Huskies ended up with the win 92–58.

==== South Florida (home) ====
South Florida is in second place in the American Conference, and came to Connecticut knowing they were underdogs, but believing they could compete. It dod not take long to change that impression. The Huskies scored the first nine points of the game, then had a 12–0 run to extend the lead to 19 points. As if that wasn't enough, Connecticut later held the South Florida team scoreless for over eight minutes while scoring 17 points. Mosqueda-Lewis was the leading scorer with 18 points, followed closely by Stewart with 17. UConn went on to win 92–50.

==== UCF (away) ====
UConn traveled to Orlando to take on the Central Florida Knights, the only scheduled regular season meeting of the two teams. The game result was never in doubt as the Huskies had a 61–18 lead at the half, hitting over 70% of their field goal attempts. The game was tied at two points each, but Connecticut scored the next ten points to set the tone for the game. Mosqueda-Lewis was the leading scorer for the Huskies with 23 points, hitting five of her seven three-point attempts. The final score was 100–45.

==== Cincinnati (away) ====
UConn played the first of their two regular season games against Cincinnati at their home court. The Bearcats are coached by former stand-out player for UConn and long time assistant coach Jamelle Elliot. Auriemma has not yet lost a game to a coach who was a former player or assistant, and this would be no different. Mosqueda-Lewis hit all four of her field goals attempts in the first half, two of which were outside the three-point line on her way to 19 points for the game, which moved her ahead of Svetlana Abrosimova into tenth place on the all-time UConn scoring list. Only one starter played more than 19 minutes, as the Huskies won easily 96–31.

==== East Carolina (away) ====
East Carolina came to play UConn for the first time in Connecticut on 28 January 2015. The story line of the game wasn't the result, which the Huskies won easily 87–32, but a rare triple-double for a UConn player. Kiah Stokes was close to a triple double when assistant coach Maria Moseley urged her to get another block, a rebound, and some points. She managed to pick up the block and rebound on the same play, blocking a shot and retaining possession for a rebound but she didn't score her tenth point until there were 33 seconds left in the game, when Briana Pulido fed her a pass and she put in the layup to complete a triple double, with ten points, eleven rebounds and a school record ten blocks.

==== Temple (away) ====
UConn played the second of their two games against Temple at their McGonigle Hall. Temple started out positively, scoring the first five points, and still holding an 8–4 lead when UConn went on an 8–0 run to take the lead. The game was still close when Chong and Nurse hit consecutive three-pointers to open up a larger lead. The Huskies went on to win 83–49.

==== Cincinnati (home) ====
UConn started out slowly, falling behind 5–0 for the second game in a row. The tide turned quickly, as the Huskies scored the next 15 points, and later in the half went on a 22–0 run to ensure that the outcome was never in doubt. The win was the 900th for Head Coach Auriemma and Associate head Coach Chris Dailey. They reached this win in game 1034, the fastest to 900 for any basketball coach. He is now tied for fifth place on the list of all-time women's basketball wins. His winning percentage is 87%, the best among all coaches, active or retired.

Williams came off the bench to score a career-high 18 points, and lead all scorers. The final was, in favor of Connecticut, was 96–36. The team celebrated by donning T-shirts with "Geno Never Stops" on one side and 900 on the other side. They wore homemade glasses featuring the number 900.

==== Memphis (away) ====
Auriemma was not happy with the way the team was starting games, having fallen behind early in the prior two games and not playing up to his expectations in the early part of the game against Memphis, so he decided to bench both Stewart and Tuck a few minutes into the game. Stokes also saw limited action. Auriemma explained "There’s a certain level of play that I've been accustomed to at Connecticut, and if you’re not there then you’re not playing." Stewart and Tuck remained on the bench for the rest of the game, while the remaining players cruised to an 80–34 win over the Tigers.

==== South Carolina (home) ====
On the ninth of February, the second ranked Huskies hosted the nation's top ranked team, the South Carolina Gamecocks. The weather was cold, blowing and snowy, with treacherous driving conditions. The arena was sold-out. A few hundred ticket-holders chose not to attend, but turned their tickets in to be given to students.

Jefferson opened the scoring with a three-point basket, but South Carolina responded, and took an 18–15 lead with 12:28 left in the first half. The Huskies then picked up the pace, out scoring the Gamecocks 32–13 for the rest of the half giving the Huskies a 16-point lead at halftime. The Gamecocks opened the second half with six consecutive points, but the Huskies again stepped up the offense, pushing the lead out to 20 points, and eventually to a 25-point margin at the final buzzer, for an 87–62 victory and a virtually certain return to the number one position in the polls.

UConn has now played in 20 games between the top two teams in the nation, and has a 17–3 record in those games.

==== Tulane (home) ====
The game against Tulane was not just the first meeting as part of the American Athletic Conference, but the first meeting ever. The huskies led from the start, with an early 10–0 run then a 15–0 run to take a 25–4 lead. The lead stretched to 30 points by halftime, and extended in the second half, with the final score over the Green Wave being 87–39.

==== Houston (home) ====
The game against Houston was a mismatch. Stewart scored 26 points to lead the Huskies and tie the Cougars. Although it took almost two minutes for the Huskies to score and eight attempts at a three-pointer before making one, there were few other missteps in the game. UConn outscored Houston 62–8 in the paint. The final score in the first game at the nation number one seed was 85–26 in favor of UConn.

==== Tulsa (away) ====
The game against Tulsa was the first visit by UConn to that city. Stewart continued her fine play, scoring 23 of her 28 points in the first half, matching the Tulsa total for the first half. Mosqueda-Lewis hit five three-pointers in the first half. Five UConn players scored in double digits, with Jefferson and Nurse scoring 12 and Chong scoring 11. The final score was 92–46.

==== Tulane (away) ====
UConn faced Tulane at their home arena, Devlin Fieldhouse. The Huskies doubled up the Green Wave 94–47, which secured at least a share of the conference regular season championship. Jefferson had eight steals, which she credited to the scouting report of Shea Ralph. The win represented the 800th game without back-to-back losses, a steak which extends back to 1993, before any of the current team members were born. The Green Wave were one of three teams in the conference with 20 or more wins.

==== Memphis (home) ====
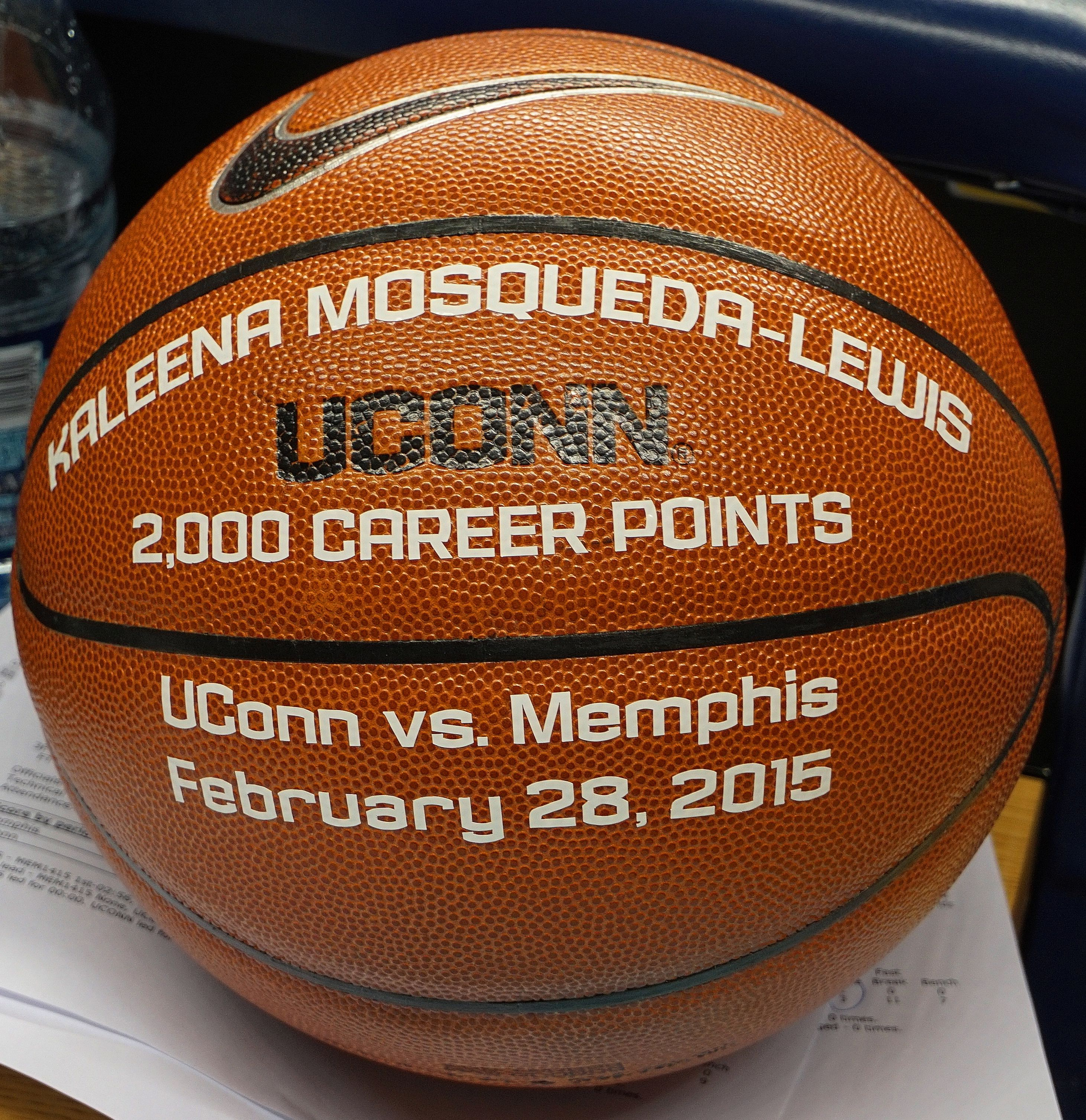
Kaleena Mosqueda-Lewis ball commemorating 2000th career point

The game itself was almost an afterthought. Uconn beat Memphis 87–24 in front of a sellout crowd, but the crowd was there for Senior Day-the last regular season game of the carriers of seniors Kalana Mosqueda-Lewis and Kiah Stokes. Before the game, the seniors and their families were honored by the coaching staff and fans, walking out to hold aloft their framed jerseys, and get one more cheer from the crowd. Kalana's brother Xander stole the show by running out into the arms of Auriemma. Mosquesda-Lewis was honored by having her number added to the Huskies of Honor on the wall of Gampel, honoring very special players and teams. During the game, Mosquesda-Lewis scored her 2.000th point, two years after scoring her 1,000th point on Senior Day when she was a sophomore. The score was assisted by fellow senior Stokes, whose first block of the game was her 300th of her career, and led to a score, starting a 31–0 run to put the game out of reach.

==== South Florida (away) ====
The South Florida team is solidly the second best in the American conference, a team that is likely to get a post-season bid and may do well there. However, there is still a gap between the best team in the conference and the second best team as epitomized by the 23-point win by the Huskies over the Bulls. Stewart had 29 points along with 11 rebounds, while setting a career high for blocks with seven. That overshadowed Mosqueda-Lewis's fine performance, hitting another four three-pointers. The final score was 88–65.

=== American Athletic Conference tournament games ===
==== Cincinnati (AAC) ====
The first game of the AAC tournament was against Cincinnati, a team coached by a former UConn player and assistant coach, but a team that UConn has beaten easily. This time would prove no different, as the Huskies won an easy victory 93–34. The game was more about individual goals, as Mosqueda-Lewis hit four three-pointers in her chase of the NCAA career record. Stokes recorded three blocks to reach 128 on the season, only three away from tying Rebecca Lobo's single season UConn record of 131.

==== East Carolina (AAC) ====
The second tournament game was against East Carolina. The game was never close, and the Huskies prevailed, 106–56. Stokes recorded four blocks to surpass Lobo and become the record holder for Career blocks at UConn. The Huskies shot 77% from the field in the first half, and ended the game with a 66% field goal shooting percentage.

==== South Florida (AAC) ====
UConn faced the Bulls for the Conference Championship. Although the Huskies won by 14 points 84–70, that is the smallest margin of victory in their conference games, and the smallest margin of victory outside the early season loss to Stanford. Mosqueda-Lewis scored 23 points to lead the Huskies to their second undefeated run through the American Athletic conference regular and post-season schedule.

=== NCAA tournament championship ===
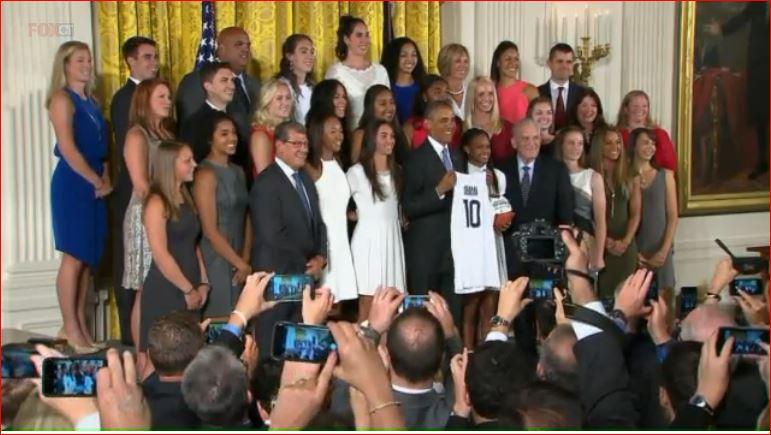
UConn Huskies at the White House to honor the 2015 Championship

==== St. Francis (Brooklyn) ====
UConn's first opponent in the NCAA Tournament was St. Francis (Brooklyn). The Terriers earned a spot in the tournament by winning the Northeast Conference tournament. The Terriers were the #5 seed, so they played their first game on the road, and won, which matched them against the #1 seed Central Connecticut, in a game to be played on Central's home court. St. Francis won again, this time in double overtime. That placed them in the final, against Robert Morris on their home court. St. Francis won again, earning the automatic bid to the NCAA tournament. The “prize” was playing the top seeded team in the tournament. One of the St. Francis players was Sarah Benedetti, who grew up in Canton, CT following the UConn team before opting to play at St. Francis. She hit several three-pointers, and ended up with 13 points. However, the talent of the Huskies proved to be too much, as the UConn team hit over 70% of their shots, with Tuck scoring on 12 of her 13 attempts leading to a career-high 26 points. The final score in favor of the Huskies, was 89–33.

==== Rutgers ====
After the conference realignment, with Rutgers in the Big Ten Conference, the teams no longer automatically met in the regular season, but they were assigned to the same NCAA region, and met in the second round. The game did not start off like recent games have started. Stewart uncharacteristically picked up two early fouls and went to the bench. Some of the usual scorers were not scoring. Eventually, Mosqueda-Lewis took over and started an 11–0 run to open up the lead which would extend to 20 points by halftime. Early in the second half, the lead would stretch to 32, and the Huskies would go on to win and earn their 22nd consecutive trip to the Sweet 16.

==== Texas ====
A coach often tells their team they will play better in the second half following a sub-par first half. Auriemma told his team at halftime “We’re going to play even better than that...Whatever that is, we’re going to find another gear in the second half.” However, the Huskies were leading by 28 points, 52–24, against Texas at the time of his prediction. Auriemma turned out to be correct, as the UConn lead extended out from 31 points to 42 points in under four minutes. The final margin of 51 points is the largest margin of victory in an NCAA regional or Final Four game. The win represented Auriemma's 100th NCAA victory. Stewart scored 31 points, and left the game with just over nine minutes remaining. Jefferson, a Texas native, scored a career-high 25 points.

==== Dayton ====
The Huskies found themselves in unfamiliar territory at halftime of the regional final against Dayton—they were trailing, for the first time this season. The Dayton Flyers were no strangers to challenges; they had defeated both the #2 seed Kentucky and the #3 seed Louisville to set up the match against UConn. In the first half, the Flyers hit seven of their ten three-point attempts, led by Ally Malott, who hit all four she attempted. Auriemma adjusted the defense in the second half, effectively, as Malott would not score in the second half. The Huskies took the lead, extended it to eleven points, then out to 20 points. The final score was 91–70.

Mosqueda-Lewis hit a three-pointer to give her 392 in her career, setting a new record for the NCAA Division I.

==== Maryland ====
One game after setting the NCAA Division I career record for threes, Mosqueda-Lewis hit only a single basket in the game against Maryland, but when shots weren't falling, she passed to her teammates, recording seven assists. Tuck scored on ten of her 16 shots, totaling 24 points along with nine rebounds. Stewart scored 25, as Auriemma felt the Huskies had a post advantage against the guard-oriented Terrapins, so sought to push the ball inside. The plan worked, and UConn beat Maryland 81–58 to earn a place in the championship game.

==== Notre Dame ====
The Huskies defeated the Notre Dame Fighting Irish at Amalie Arena in Tampa, Florida, to win their third consecutive NCAA championship. Breanna Stewart was voted Most Outstanding Player by the Associated Press. Coach Auriemma tied a record set by John Wooden by winning ten NCAA national championships.

== Schedule ==
Date time, TV	Rank^{#}	Opponent^{#}	Result	Record	High points	High rebounds	High assists	Site (attendance) city, state
Exhibition
11/02/2014*; 1:00 PM	No. 1	West Chester	W 115–26	–	19 – Jefferson	12 – Stokes	6 – Stewart	Gampel Pavilion (6,029); Storrs, CT
11/09/2014*; 4:30 PM	No. 1	Post	W 117–44	–	27 – Stewart	15 – Tuck	6 – Mosqueda-Lewis	XL Center (7,216); Hartford, CT
Regular Season
11/14/2014*; 10:00 PM, ESPN3	No. 1	at UC Davis	W 102–43	1–0	30 – Mosqueda-Lewis	7 – Stokes	7 – Tied	The Pavilion (4,712); Davis, CA
11/17/2014*; 9:00 PM, ESPN2	No. 1	at No. 6 Stanford	L 86–88 ^{OT}	1–1	23 – Stewart	10 – Stewart	6 – Jefferson	Maples Pavilion (5,367); Stanford, CA
11/23/2014*; 1:00 PM, SNY	No. 1	Creighton	W 96–60	2–1	25 – Stewart	10 – Tied	6 – Jefferson	Gampel Pavilion (7,123); Storrs, CT
11/28/2014*; 8:30 PM, SNY	No. 3	vs. College of Charleston; Gulf Coast Showcase Quarterfinals	W 85–24	3–1	21 – Mosqueda-Lewis	13 – Stokes	7 – Nurse	Germain Arena (3,987); Estero, FL
11/29/2014*; 8:30 PM, SNY	No. 3	vs. Vanderbilt; Gulf Coast Showcase semifinals	W 91–52	4–1	16 – Tied	7 – Stokes	5 – Jefferson	Germain Arena (3,177); Estero, FL
11/30/2014*; 8:30 PM, SNY	No. 3	vs. Green Bay; Gulf Coast Showcase championship	W 89–53	5–1	19 – Jefferson	9 – Stewart	5 – Jefferson	Germain Arena (3,217); Estero, FL
12/06/2014*; 3:15 PM, ESPN	No. 3	at No. 2 Notre Dame; Jimmy V Classic	W 76–58	6–1	25 – Tuck	9 – Tied	3 – Tuck	Edmund P. Joyce Center (9,149); South Bend, IN
12/19/2014*; 7:30 PM, SNY	No. 2	No. 25 DePaul	W 98–64	7–1	25 – Stewart	9 – Mosqueda-Lewis	5 – Tied	Webster Bank Arena (9,056); Bridgeport, CT
12/21/2014*; 5:00 PM, ESPN2	No. 2	vs. UCLA; Hall of Fame Women's Challenge	W 86–50	8–1	25 – Stewart	10 – Stokes	6 – Nurse	Mohegan Sun Arena (8,015); Uncasville, CT
12/27/2014; 1:00 PM, SNY	No. 2	SMU	W 96–45	9–1 (1–0)	24 – Jefferson	12 – Stewart	7 – Nurse	XL Center (9,972); Hartford, CT
12/29/2014*; 9:00 PM, ESPN2	No. 2	No. 10 Duke	W 83–52	10–1	18 – Jefferson	7 – Tuck	4 – Tied	XL Center (13,514); Hartford, CT
12/31/2014; 2:30 PM, SNY	No. 2	at East Carolina	W 89–38	11–1 (2–0)	26 – Stewart	6 – Tied	4 – Jefferson	Williams Arena (4,706); Greenville, NC
01/04/2015*; 1:00 PM, ESPN2	No. 2	vs. St. John's; Maggie Dixon Classic	W 70–54	12–1	23 – Tuck	11 – Stewart	6 – Jefferson	Madison Square Garden (7,419); New York City, NY
01/07/2015; 7:00 PM, SNY	No. 2	Tulsa	W 98–60	13–1 (3–0)	22 – Jefferson	9 – Williams	8 – Stewart	XL Center (8,103); Hartford, CT
01/11/2015; 3:00 PM, SNY	No. 2	at SMU	W 87–28	14–1 (4–0)	19 – Stewart	16 – Williams	10 – Jefferson	Moody Coliseum (2,606); Dallas, TX
01/14/2015; 7:00 PM, SNY	No. 2	Temple	W 92–58	15–1 (5–0)	24 – Tuck	10 – Tied	6 – Stewart	Gampel Pavilion (6,712); Storrs, CT
01/18/2015; 1:00 PM, ESPN2	No. 2	South Florida	W 92–50	16–1 (6–0)	18 – Mosqueda-Lewis	10 – Stewart	7 – Jefferson	Gampel Pavilion (9,030); Storrs, CT
01/21/2015; 7:00 PM, SNY	No. 2	at UCF	W 100–45	17–1 (7–0)	23 – Mosqueda-Lewis	7 – Stokes	5 – Mosqueda-Lewis	CFE Arena (2,975); Orlando, FL
01/25/2015; 3:00 PM, ESPN2	No. 2	at Cincinnati	W 96–31	18–1 (8–0)	19 – Tied	14 – Stokes	6 – Nurse	Fifth Third Arena (1,579); Cincinnati, OH
01/28/2015; 7:00 PM, SNY	No. 2	East Carolina	W 87–32	19–1 (9–0)	17 – Tuck	11 – Stokes	5 – Stewart	XL Center (7,269); Hartford, CT
02/01/2015; 2:00 PM, ESPN2	No. 2	at Temple	W 83–49	20–1 (10–0)	17 – Stewart	8 – Tied	4 – Tied	McGonigle Hall (2,646); Philadelphia, PA
02/03/2015; 7:00 PM, SNY	No. 2	Cincinnati	W 96–36	21–1 (11–0)	18 – Williams	14 – Williams	5 – Nurse	XL Center (8,190); Hartford, CT
02/07/2015; 3:30 PM, SNY	No. 2	at Memphis	W 80–34	22–1 (12–0)	18 – Nurse	13 – Williams	4 – Nurse	FedEx Forum (2,267); Memphis, TN
02/09/2015*; 8:00 PM, ESPN2	No. 2	No. 1 South Carolina	W 87–62	23–1	23 – Mosqueda-Lewis	8 – Stewart	6 – Jefferson	Gampel Pavilion (10,167); Storrs, CT
02/14/2015; 4:00 PM, CBSSN	No. 2	Tulane	W 87–39	24–1 (13–0)	16 – Jefferson	8 – Tuck	5 – Tied	Gampel Pavilion (9,347); Storrs, CT
02/17/2015; 7:00 PM, SNY	No. 1	Houston	W 85–26	25–1 (14–0)	26 – Stewart	9 – Tuck	4 – Tied	XL Center (7,445); Hartford, CT
02/21/2015; 3:00 PM, SNY	No. 1	at Tulsa	W 92–46	26–1 (15–0)	28 – Stewart	9 – Stewart	6 – Jefferson	Reynolds Center (3,568); Tulsa, OK
02/23/2015; 8:00 PM, SNY	No. 1	at Tulane	W 94–47	27–1 (16–0)	21 – Mosqueda-Lewis	10 – Stewart	8 – Chong	Devlin Fieldhouse (1,900); New Orleans, LA
02/28/2015; 2:00 PM, CBSSN	No. 1	Memphis	W 87–24	28–1 (17–0)	21 – Mosqueda-Lewis	10 – Williams	6 – Jefferson	Gampel Pavilion (10,167); Storrs, CT
03/02/2015; 7:00 PM, ESPN2	No. 1	at South Florida	W 88–65	29–1 (18–0)	29 – Stewart	11 – Stewart	9 – Nurse	USF Sun Dome (5,565); Tampa, FL
2015 AAC tournament
03/07/2015; 2:00 PM, ESPN3	No. 1	vs. Cincinnati; Quarterfinals	W 93–34	30–1	18 – Mosqueda-Lewis	12 – Stewart	9 – Jefferson	Mohegan Sun Arena (6,677); Uncasville, CT
03/08/2015; 5:30 PM, ESPNU	No. 1	vs. East Carolina; Semifinals	W 106–56	31–1	21 – Mosqueda-Lewis	9 – Stewart	6 – Jefferson	Mohegan Sun Arena (6,531); Uncasville, CT
03/09/2015; 7:00 PM, ESPN	No. 1	vs. South Florida; Championship Game	W 84–70	32–1	23 – Mosqueda-Lewis	12 – Stewart	6 – Mosqueda-Lewis	Mohegan Sun Arena (6,499); Uncasville, CT
2015 NCAA women's tournament
03/21/2015*; 9:00 PM, ESPN2	No. 1	St. Francis Brooklyn; First Round	W 89–33	33–1	26 – Tuck	10 – Tied	8 – Tuck	Gampel Pavilion (3,666); Storrs, CT
03/23/2015*; 9:00 PM, ESPN2	No. 1	Rutgers; Second Round/Rivalry	W 91–55	34–1	23 – Mosqueda-Lewis	10 – Williams	7 – Tuck	Gampel Pavilion (3,486); Storrs, CT
03/28/2015*; 12:00 PM, ESPN	No. 1	vs. Texas; Sweet Sixteen	W 105–54	35–1	31 – Stewart	12 – Stewart	7 – Stewart	Times Union Center (N/A); Albany, NY
03/30/2015*; 7:00 PM, ESPN	No. 1	vs. Dayton; Elite Eight	W 91–70	36–1	27 – Mosqueda-Lewis	16 – Stewart	8 – Jefferson	Times Union Center (7,686); Albany, NY
04/05/2015*; 8:30 PM, ESPN	No. 1	vs. No. 4 Maryland; Final Four	W 81–58	37–1	25 – Stewart	9 – Tuck	7 – Mosqueda-Lewis	Amalie Arena (19,730); Tampa, FL
04/07/2015*; 8:30 PM, ESPN	No. 1	vs. No. 2 Notre Dame; Championship Game	W 63–53	38–1	15 – Tied	15 – Stewart	7 – Tuck	Amalie Arena (19,810); Tampa, FL
*Non-conference game. ^{#}Rankings from AP Poll. (#) Tournament seedings in parentheses. All times are in EST.

== Awards and honors ==
- Breanna Stewart earned the Most Outstanding Player of the Final Four at the 2015 NCAA Division I women's basketball tournament for a record third consecutive time
- Breanna Stewart wins the Associated Press Women's College Basketball Player of the Year for the second consecutive year
- Breanna Stewart wins the Wade Trophy presented to the NCAA Division I player of the year
- Breanna Stewart was awarded the Naismith College Player of the Year for the second consecutive year
- Breanna Stewart won the USBWA Women's National Player of the Year for the third consecutive year
- Breanna Stewart won the 2015 American Athletic Conference Women's Basketball Player of the Year
- Breanna Stewart won the 2015 Wooden Award
- Moriah Jefferson won the Nancy Lieberman Award

== Rankings ==
Ranking movement Legend: ██ Increase in ranking. ██ Decrease in ranking. NR = Not ranked. RV = Received votes.
Poll	Pre	Wk 2	Wk 3	Wk 4	Wk 5	Wk 6	Wk 7	Wk 8	Wk 9	Wk 10	Wk 11	Wk 12	Wk 13	Wk 14	Wk 15	Wk 16	Wk 17	Wk 18	Final
AP	1	1	3	3	2	2	2	2	2	2	2	2	2	2	1	1	1	1	1
Coaches	1	4	3	3	2	2	2	2	2	2	2	2	2	1	1	1	1	1	1
