= Maggie Dixon Classic =

Annual women's college basketball tournament

- Sport: Women's college basketball
- Number of teams: 2-4
- Current stadium: Schollmaier Arena
- Current location: Fort Worth, Texas
- Played: 2006–present
- Last contest: 2024
- TV partner(s): N/A; Formerly on ESPN, ESPN2, ESPNU

Sponsors
- Aeropostale (2007–08); Advance Auto Parts (2013–15)

Host stadiums
- Christl Arena (2006); Madison Square Garden (2007–15); Carnesecca Arena (2016); Reed Arena (2017); Schollmaier Arena (2018–24)

Host locations
- West Point (2006); New York City (2007–16); College Station (2017); Fort Worth (2018–24)

Maggie Dixon Classic
- Sport: Women's College basketball
- Founded: 2006
- No. of teams: 2-4
- Country: United States
- Venues: Madison Square Garden, New York
- Broadcasters: ESPN; ESPN2; ESPNU (2013)

The Maggie Dixon Classic is an annual early-season women's college basketball tournament that was first played in 2006. The classic is played in honor of Maggie Dixon who, in April 2006, just after leading the Army women's basketball team to their first-ever NCAA tournament, died suddenly due to an arrhythmia caused by a previously undiagnosed heart condition.

On November 12, 2006, the first Maggie Dixon Classic was played at the Christl Arena in West Point, New York, where Maggie coached her only season with the Lady Knights. Since this edition of the Maggie Dixon Classic, every other classic had featured a four-team, two-game doubleheader. The 2006 Maggie Dixon Classic was the only edition of the event to feature a men's game; in which the Pittsburgh Panthers coached by Jamie Dixon, Maggie's brother, defeated Western Michigan by a final score of 86–67.

In 2007, the Maggie Dixon Classic was moved to the historic Madison Square Garden in New York City and has been held there ever since. The Maggie Dixon Classic has also produced the eventual national champions in 2008, 2010, 2011 and 2013. Also in 2010, the UConn women's basketball team tied UCLA's 88-game win streak from the 1970s. The Huskies would eventually break the record and end their winning streak at 90 games.

On January 4, 2015, Immaculata University and Queens College played in the Maggie Dixon Classic as a commemoration of the 40th anniversary of the first game played between women's basketball teams in the Madison Square Garden. The second game of that doubleheader featured the UConn Huskies and St. John's Red Storm.

In 2016, the Classic was moved to the campus of DePaul University in Chicago, the school where Maggie Dixon served as an assistant coach under the direction of Doug Bruno. Upon moving to Chicago, the Classic was also restructured from its traditional format to a four-team knockout tournament. In 2017, Classic Games were moved to the Wintrust Arena; which opened in October of that year.

DePaul has won both Maggie Dixon Classics played in Chicago.

TCU and Texas A&M took part in the event in 2017 at Reed Arena in College Station, Texas. Since 2018, the Classic has been played annually at Schollmaier Arena in Fort Worth, Texas, on the campus of TCU. The Horned Frogs hosted Dixon's former team, Army, in 2018 and again battled the Black Knights in the 2023 edition of the Classic.

== Past Results and Appearances ==
| Date | Location | Winning team | | Losing team | |
|---|---|---|---|---|---|
| November 12, 2006 | Christl Arena (West Point, New York) | Pittsburgh (men) | **86** | Western Michigan (men) | 67 |
| November 12, 2006 | Christl Arena (West Point, New York) | Ohio State | **77** | Army | 41 |
| December 8, 2007 | Madison Square Garden (New York City) | Duke | **51** | Pittsburgh | 49 |
| December 8, 2007 | Madison Square Garden (New York City) | Rutgers | **75** | Army | 68 |
| December 14, 2008 | Madison Square Garden (New York City) | Rutgers | **59** | Army | 38 |
| December 14, 2008 | Madison Square Garden (New York City) | Connecticut | **77** | Penn State | 63 |
| December 13, 2009 | Madison Square Garden (New York City) | Baylor | **68** | Boston College | 55 |
| December 13, 2009 | Madison Square Garden (New York City) | Tennessee | **68** | Rutgers | 54 |
| December 19, 2010* | Madison Square Garden (New York City) | Texas A&M | **79** | Rutgers | 50 |
| December 19, 2010* | Madison Square Garden (New York City) | Connecticut | **81** | Ohio State | 50 |
| December 11, 2011 | Madison Square Garden (New York City) | Baylor | **73** | St. Johns | 59 |
| December 11, 2011 | Madison Square Garden (New York City) | Tennessee | **84** | DePaul | 61 |
| December 9, 2012 | Madison Square Garden (New York City) | Rutgers | **73** | Louisiana Tech | 46 |
| December 9, 2012 | Madison Square Garden (New York City) | Duke | **60** | St. Johns | 42 |
| December 22, 2013 | Madison Square Garden (New York City) | St. Johns | **72** | Texas A&M | 70 |
| December 22, 2013 | Madison Square Garden (New York City) | Connecticut | **80** | California | 47 |
| January 4, 2015 | Madison Square Garden (New York City) | Queens College | **76** | Immaculata University | 60 |
| January 4, 2015 | Madison Square Garden (New York City) | Connecticut | **70** | St. Johns | 54 |
| December 28, 2015 | Madison Square Garden (New York City) | Connecticut | **83** | Maryland | 73 |
| November 11, 2016 | McGrath-Phillips Arena (Chicago, Illinois) | UAB | **59** | Gardner-Webb | 49 |
| November 11, 2016 | McGrath-Phillips Arena (Chicago, Illinois) | DePaul | **99** | Appalachian State | 58 |
| November 12, 2016 | McGrath-Phillips Arena (Chicago, Illinois) | Appalachian State | **72** | Gardner-Webb | 67 |
| November 12, 2016 | McGrath-Phillips Arena (Chicago, Illinois) | DePaul | **90** | UAB | 80 |
| November 17, 2017 | Wintrust Arena (Chicago, Illinois) | Saint Louis | **79** | Ole Miss | 64 |
| November 17, 2017 | Wintrust Arena (Chicago, Illinois) | DePaul | **110** | Delaware State | 71 |
| November 18, 2017 | Wintrust Arena (Chicago, Illinois) | DePaul | **86** | Saint Louis | 78 |
| November 18, 2017 | Wintrust Arena (Chicago, Illinois) | Ole Miss | **110** | Delaware State | 58 |
| December 6, 2017 | Reed Arena (College Station, Texas) | Texas A&M | **71** | TCU | 58 |
| December 1, 2018 | Schollmaier Arena (Fort Worth, Texas) | TCU | **63** | Army | 38 |
| December 1, 2019 | Schollmaier Arena (Fort Worth, Texas) | TCU | **77** | Boise State | 65 |
| December 1, 2019 | Schollmaier Arena (Fort Worth, Texas) | Florida State | **80** | Texas A&M | 58 |
| November 21, 2021 | Schollmaier Arena (Fort Worth, Texas) | North Carolina | **79** | TCU | 49 |
| November 21, 2021 | Schollmaier Arena (Fort Worth, Texas) | Duke | **74** | Alabama | 71 |
| November 20, 2022 | Schollmaier Arena (Fort Worth, Texas) | South Florida | **66** | TCU | 59 |
| November 20, 2022 | Schollmaier Arena (Fort Worth, Texas) | Oklahoma | **89** | UT Arlington | 80 |
| November 19, 2023 | Schollmaier Arena (Fort Worth, Texas) | Army West Point | **88** | TCU | 51 |
| December 15, 2024 | Schollmaier Arena (Fort Worth, Texas) | TCU | **92** | Louisiana Tech | 41 |
| November 23, 2025 | **TCU** | 93 | UTRGV | 57 | |

=== Appearances ===
- As of the 2025 Maggie Dixon Classic, excluding the men's game from 2006. Teams in **bold text** won their game.

| Rank | School | Times | Years participated |
|---|---|---|---|
| 1 | TCU | 8 | 2017, **2018, 2019**, 2021, 2022, **2023, 2024, 2025** |
| 2 | Rutgers | 5 | **2007**, **2008**, 2009, 2010, **2012** |
| 2 | UConn | 5 | **2008, 2010, 2013, 2015 (Jan.), 2015 (Dec.)** |
| 2 | St. John's | 5 | 2011, 2012, **2013**, 2015, 2017 |
| 2 | Army | 5 | 2006, 2007, 2008, 2018, 2023 |
| 3 | Texas A&M | 4 | 2010, 2013, **2017**, 2019 |
| 4 | Duke | 3 | **2007, 2012, 2021** |
| 4 | DePaul | 3 | 2011, **2016**, **2017** |
| 5 | Ohio State | 2 | **2006**, 2010 |
| 5 | Tennessee | 2 | **2009, 2011** |
| 5 | Baylor | 2 | 2009, 2010 |
| 5 | Louisiana Tech | 2 | 2012, 2024 |
| 6 | Queens College | 1 | **2015 (Jan.)** |
| 6 | Immaculata | 1 | 2015 (Jan.) |
| 6 | California | 1 | 2013 |
| 6 | Boston College | 1 | 2009 |
| 6 | Penn State | 1 | 2008 |
| 6 | Pittsburgh | 1 | 2007 |
| 6 | Maryland | 1 | 2015 (Dec.) |
| 6 | Appalachian State | 1 | 2016 |
| 6 | UAB | 1 | 2016 |
| 6 | Gardner-Webb | 1 | 2016 |
| 6 | Delaware St. | 1 | 2017 |
| 6 | Ole Miss | 1 | 2017 |
| 6 | St. Louis | 1 | 2017 |
| 6 | Army | 1 | 2018 |
| 6 | Boise State | 1 | 2019 |
| 6 | Alabama | 1 | 2021 |
| 6 | North Carolina | 1 | 2021 |
| 6 | South Florida | 1 | 2022 |
| 6 | UT Arlington | 1 | 2022 |
| UT Rio Grande Valley | 1 | 2025 | |

== Maggie Dixon Courage Award ==
Since the 2009 Classic, the family of Maggie Dixon has presented the Maggie Dixon Courage Award. This award is presented to an individual who exhibits courage in the face of adversity and continues to exemplify Dixon's mantra of never allowing adversity get in the way of achieving a dream. The award is always presented by Dixon's sister Julie Dixon Silva and by Dixon's older brother Jamie Dixon.

| Edition | Recipient | School/affiliation |
|---|---|---|
| 2009 | LTC Kim Kawamoto | former Army women's basketball player |
| 2009 | C. Vivian Stringer | Rutgers women's basketball head coach |
| 2010 | Tierra Rodgers | California women's basketball player |
| 2011 | Pat Summitt | Tennessee women's basketball head coach |
| 2012 | Joe Heskett | Army wrestling head coach |
| 2013 | Tracey Ryan | registered nurse at the University of Pittsburgh Medical Center (UMPC) |
| 2015 | Geno Auriemma | UConn women's basketball head coach |
