= 2014–15 Notre Dame Fighting Irish women's basketball team =

Intercollegiate basketball season

2014–15 Notre Dame Fighting Irish women's basketball

ACC tournament champions ACC regular season champions Hall of Fame Challenge champions

NCAA tournament, Runner-Up
- Conference: Atlantic Coast Conference

Ranking
- Coaches: No. 2
- AP: No. 2
- Record: 36–3 (15–1 ACC)
- Head coach: Muffet McGraw (28th season)
- Assistant coaches: Carol Owens; Beth Cunningham; Niele Ivey
- Home arena: Edmund P. Joyce Center

2014–15 ACC women's basketball standings
	Conf.				Overall
Team	W		L	PCT	W		L	PCT
No. 2 Notre Dame^{†}	15	–	1	.938	36	–	3	.923
No. 7 Florida State	14	–	2	.875	32	–	5	.865
No. 8 Louisville	12	–	4	.750	27	–	7	.794
No. 16 Duke	11	–	5	.688	23	–	11	.676
Syracuse	11	–	5	.688	22	–	10	.688
No. 15 North Carolina	10	–	6	.625	26	–	9	.743
Pittsburgh	9	–	7	.563	20	–	12	.625
Miami (FL)	8	–	8	.500	20	–	13	.606
Virginia	7	–	9	.438	17	–	14	.548
NC State	7	–	9	.438	18	–	15	.545
Georgia Tech	7	–	9	.438	19	–	15	.559
Boston College	5	–	11	.313	13	–	17	.433
Wake Forest	2	–	14	.125	13	–	20	.394
Virginia Tech	1	–	15	.063	12	–	20	.375
Clemson	1	–	15	.063	9	–	21	.300
† 2015 ACC tournament winner As of 7 April 2015; Rankings from AP poll

The 2014–15 Notre Dame Fighting Irish women's basketball team represented University of Notre Dame during the 2014–15 NCAA Division I women's basketball season. The Fighting Irish, led by twenty-eighth year head coach Muffet McGraw, played their home games at the Purcell Pavilion at the Joyce Center and were second year members of the Atlantic Coast Conference.

By edging South Carolina 66–65 in the Final Four the Irish got a rematch of last year's championship game vs. Connecticut. Like last year things didn't go well for the Irish after trailing 31–23 at the half; they were outscored 32–30 in the 2nd half and ended up 63–53 losers.

== 2014–15 Roster ==
2014–15 Notre Dame Fighting Irish women's basketball team
Players
Coaches

Pos.	#	Name	Height	Year	Previous school	Hometown
G	15	Lindsay Allen	5 ft 7 in (1.7 m)	So	St. John's College	Mitchellville, Md.
G	22	Madison Cable	5 ft 11 in (1.8 m)	Sr	Mt. Lebanon	Mt. Lebanon, Pa.
G	3	Whitney Holloway	5 ft 4 in (1.63 m)	Sr	Montini Catholic	Plainfield, Ill.
G	24	Hannah Huffman	5 ft 9 in (1.75 m)	Jr	Carondelet	Diablo, Calif.
G	14	Mychal Johnson	5 ft 8 in (1.73 m)	Fr	Huntington St. Joseph	Huntington, W.Va.
G	32	Jewell Loyd	5 ft 10 in (1.78 m)	Jr	Niles West	Lincolnwood, Ill.
G	23	Michaela Mabrey	5 ft 10 in (1.78 m)	Jr	Manasquan	Belmar, N.J.
F	21	Kristina Nelson (injured)	6 ft 3 in (1.91 m)	So	Buford	Buford, Ga.
F	12	Taya Reimer	6 ft 3 in (1.91 m)	So	Hamilton Southeastern	Fishers, Ind.
C	35	Diamond Thompson	6 ft 4 in (1.93 m)	So	Wheaton Warrenville South	Wheaton, Ill.
F	11	Brianna Turner	6 ft 3 in (1.91 m)	Fr	Manvel	Pearland, Texas
F	33	Kathryn Westbeld	6 ft 2 in (1.88 m)	Fr	Kettering Fairmont	Kettering, Ohio
F	34	Markisha Wright	6 ft 2 in (1.88 m)	Sr	Des Moines East	Des Moines, Iowa
			—

Head coach

Muffet McGraw

Assistant coach(es)

Carol Owens
Beth Cunningham
Niele Ivey

Legend

- (C) Team captain
- (S) Suspended
- (I) Ineligible
- (W) Walk-on
- Injured
- Current redshirt

Roster
Last update: 2014-09-14

== Media ==
All Notre Dame games were aired on WHPZ Pulse 96.9 FM. Games were streamed online live.

== Schedule ==
Date time, TV	Rank^{#}	Opponent^{#}	Result	Record	Site (attendance) city, state
Exhibition
11/05/2014*; 7:00 pm	No. 3	Ferris State	W 92–32	–	Edmund P. Joyce Center (8,174); South Bend, IN
Regular Season
11/14/2014*; 6:00 pm	No. 3	UMass Lowell	W 105–51	1–0	Edmund P. Joyce Center (8,659); South Bend, IN
11/19/2014*; 7:00 pm, BTN	No. 3	at No. 15 Michigan State	W 71–63	2–0	Breslin Center (8,644); East Lansing, MI
11/21/2014*; 5:00 pm	No. 3	Chattanooga	W 88–53	3–0	Edmund P. Joyce Center (8,645); South Bend, IN
11/23/2014*; 5:00 pm	No. 3	Holy Cross; Hall of Fame Women's Challenge	W 104–29	4–0	Edmund P. Joyce Center (8,684); South Bend, IN
11/24/2014*; 6:00 pm	No. 2	Harvard; Hall of Fame Women's Challenge	W 97–43	5–0	Edmund P. Joyce Center (8,566); South Bend, IN
11/25/2014*; 6:00 pm	No. 2	Quinnipiac; Hall of Fame Women's Challenge	W 112–52	6–0	Edmund P. Joyce Center (8,429); South Bend, IN
11/30/2014*; 1:00 pm, ESPN3	No. 2	vs. Kansas; Hall of Fame Women's Challenge	W 89–47	7–0	Mohegan Sun Arena (2,347); Uncasville, CT
12/03/2014*; 7:00 pm, ESPN3	No. 2	vs. No. 15 Maryland; ACC–Big Ten Women's Challenge	W 92–72	8–0	Allen County War Memorial Coliseum (9,189); Fort Wayne, IN
12/06/2014*; 3:15 pm, ESPN	No. 2	No. 3 Connecticut; Jimmy V Classic/Rivalry	L 58–76	8–1	Edmund P. Joyce Center (9,149); South Bend, IN
12/10/2014*; 9:00 pm, FS2	No. 5	at No. 25 DePaul	W 94–93 ^{OT}	9–1	McGrath-Phillips Arena (3,414); Chicago, IL
12/13/2014*; 1:00 pm	No. 5	Michigan	W 70–50	10–1	Edmund P. Joyce Center (8,904); South Bend, IN
12/21/2014*; 1:00 pm	No. 5	Saint Joseph's	W 64–50	11–1	Edmund P. Joyce Center (8,630); South Bend, IN
12/28/2014*; 4:00 pm, P12N	No. 4	at UCLA	W 82–67	12–1	Pauley Pavilion (3,004); Los Angeles, CA
01/02/2015; 7:00 pm	No. 4	Florida State	W 74–68	13–1 (1–0)	Edmund P. Joyce Center (9,149); South Bend, IN
01/04/2015; 1:00 pm, RSN	No. 4	at No. 21 Syracuse	W 85–74	14–1 (2–0)	Carrier Dome (2,158); Syracuse, NY
01/08/2015; 7:00 pm	No. 4	at Miami (FL)	L 63–78	14–2 (2–1)	BankUnited Center (1,836); Coral Gables, FL
01/11/2015; 7:00 pm	No. 4	Boston College	W 104–58	15–2 (3–1)	Edmund P. Joyce Center (9,149); South Bend, IN
01/15/2015; 7:00 pm, RSN	No. 7	at No. 12 North Carolina	W 89–79	16–2 (4–1)	Carmichael Arena (4,358); Chapel Hill, NC
01/19/2015*; 7:00 pm, ESPN2	No. 6	No. 5 Tennessee	W 88–77	17–2	Edmund P. Joyce Center (9,149); South Bend, IN
01/22/2015; 7:00 pm, ESPN3	No. 6	Georgia Tech	W 89–76	18–2 (5–1)	Edmund P. Joyce Center (8,865); South Bend, IN
01/24/2015; 5:00 pm	No. 6	at Clemson	W 74–36	19–2 (6–1)	Littlejohn Coliseum (1,214); Clemson, SC
01/29/2015; 7:00 pm, ESPN3	No. 4	at Virginia Tech	W 74–50	20–2 (7–1)	Cassell Coliseum (1,835); Blacksburg, VA
02/01/2015; 1:00 pm, RSN	No. 4	Wake Forest	W 92–63	21–2 (8–1)	Edmund P. Joyce Center (8,741); South Bend, IN
02/05/2015; 7:00 pm, ESPN3	No. 4	Virginia	W 75–54	22–2 (9–1)	Edmund P. Joyce Center (8,738); South Bend, IN
02/08/2015; 1:00 pm	No. 4	at Boston College	W 89–56	23–2 (10–1)	Conte Forum (1,924); Chestnut Hill, MA
02/16/2015; 9:00 pm, ESPN2	No. 4	No. 10 Duke	W 63–50	24–2 (11–1)	Edmund P. Joyce Center (8,659); South Bend, IN
02/19/2015; 7:00 pm, RSN	No. 4	at Georgia Tech	W 71–61	25–2 (12–1)	McCamish Pavilion (2,303); Atlanta, GA
02/23/2015; 7:00 pm, ESPN2	No. 4	No. 8 Louisville	W 68–52	26–2 (13–1)	Edmund P. Joyce Center (8,911); South Bend, IN
02/26/2015; 7:00 pm	No. 4	Pittsburgh	W 87–59	27–2 (14–1)	Edmund P. Joyce Center (8,810); South Bend, IN
03/01/2015; 2:00 pm, ESPN3	No. 4	at NC State	W 67–60	28–2 (15–1)	Reynolds Coliseum (2,649); Raleigh, NC
ACC Women's Tournament
03/06/2015; 2:00 pm, RSN	No. 2	vs. Miami (FL); Quarterfinals	W 77–61	29–2	Greensboro Coliseum (4,019); Greensboro, NC
03/07/2015; 2:00 pm, ESPNU	No. 2	vs. No. 16 Duke; Semifinals	W 55–49	30–2	Greensboro Coliseum (N/A); Greensboro, NC
03/08/2015; 1:00 pm, ESPN	No. 2	vs. No. 7 Florida State; Championship Game	W 71–58	31–2	Greensboro Coliseum (6,874); Greensboro, NC
2015 NCAA Women's Tournament
03/20/2015*; 7:30 pm, ESPN2	No. 2	Montana; First Round	W 77–43	32–2	Edmund P. Joyce Center (6,198); South Bend, IN
03/22/2015*; 9:00 pm, ESPN	No. 2	DePaul; Second Round	W 79–67	33–2	Edmund P. Joyce Center (5,658); South Bend, IN
03/27/2015*; 10:00 pm, ESPN	No. 2	vs. No. 14 Stanford; Sweet Sixteen	W 81–60	34–2	Chesapeake Energy Arena (3,878); Oklahoma City, OK
03/29/2015*; 8:30 pm, ESPN	No. 2	vs. No. 5 Baylor; Elite Eight	W 77–68	35–2	Chesapeake Energy Arena (3,329); Oklahoma City, OK
04/05/2015*; 6:30 pm, ESPN	No. 2	vs. No. 3 South Carolina; Final Four	W 66–65	36–2	Amalie Arena (N/A); Tampa, FL
04/07/2015*; 8:30 pm, ESPN	No. 2	vs. No. 1 Connecticut; National Championship	L 53–63	36–3	Amalie Arena (19,810); Tampa, FL
*Non-conference game. ^{#}Rankings from AP Poll. (#) Tournament seedings in parentheses. All times are in Eastern.

== Rankings ==
2014–15 NCAA Division I women's basketball rankings

Regular season polls
Poll	Pre- Season	Week 2	Week 3	Week 4	Week 5	Week 6	Week 7	Week 8	Week 9	Week 10	Week 11	Week 12	Week 13	Week 14	Week 15	Week 16	Week 17	Week 18	Final
AP	3	3	2	2	5	5	4	4	4	7	6	4	4	4	4	4	2	2	2
Coaches	3	2	1	1	4	4	4	4	4	7	5	4	4	4	4	4	2	2	2

Legend
	Increase in ranking
	Decrease in ranking
	No change
(RV)	Received votes
(NR)	Not ranked

== See also ==
2014–15 Notre Dame Fighting Irish men's basketball team
