= Notre Dame High School (Sherman Oaks, California) =

Location
- 13645 Riverside Drive; Sherman Oaks, Los Angeles, California 91423-2494; United States; 34°9′30″N 118°25′50″W

Information
- Type: Private, day, college-preparatory school
- Motto: Educating Hearts and Minds
- Religious affiliation: Christianity (Catholic - Congregation of Holy Cross)
- Established: 1947; 79 years ago
- NCES School ID: 00071446
- President: Robert Thomas
- Principal: Alice Cotti
- Teaching staff: 79.1 (FTE) (2017–18)
- Grades: 9–12
- Gender: Coeducational
- Enrollment: 1,229 (2017–18)
- Student to teacher ratio: 15.5:1 (2017–18)
- Colors: Navy Blue; Gold
- Athletics conference: CIF Southern Section; Mission League
- Nickname: Knights
- Rival: Crespi Carmelite Celts
- Accreditation: Western Association of Schools and Colleges
- Newspaper: The Knight
- Yearbook: Arches
- Tuition: $21,950 (9th-11th Grades) $22,450 (12th Grade)
- Website: www.ndhs.org
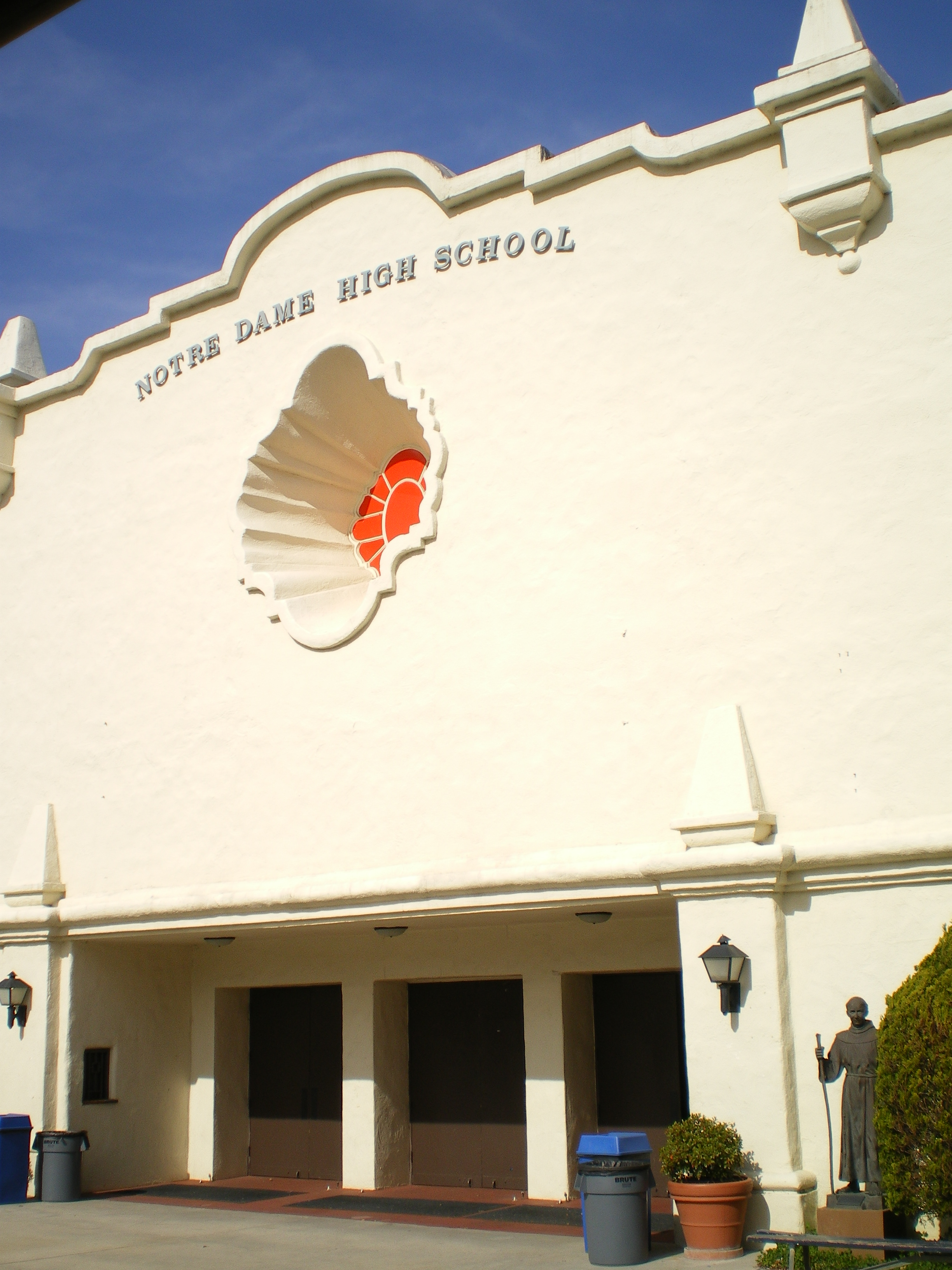
- Notre Dame High School gymnasium

Notre Dame High School (NDHS) in Sherman Oaks, Los Angeles, California, is a co-ed Catholic college preparatory high school founded by the Congregation of Holy Cross in 1947. Initially a boys' school, it has been co-educational since the 1980s and has occupied the same campus since its founding.

Located in the Archdiocese of Los Angeles, Notre Dame was designated a United States Department of Education Blue Ribbon school for 1990–1991 and 1994–1996 .

== History ==
Notre Dame High School was founded by the Congregation of Holy Cross. At that time, some Holy Cross brothers were already on the staff at a Long Beach parish high school, St. Anthony, and have had a presence in the area since the 1850's. There was only one Catholic high school in the San Fernando Valley, Corvallis High School for girls run by the Religious of the Sacred Heart of Mary, hence the decision to establish a school there to educate local boys. Father Cavanaugh, the newly-appointed president of the University of Notre Dame and two local priests visited the Riverside Drive location and purchased the land in 1945. Plans were drawn up immediately and the campus was to be built in the Mission style, the buildings modeling various Spanish Missions along the coast of California. The school opened on September 15, 1947 with 120 boys.

During the 1970s, Notre Dame went through a tumultuous period where enrollment dipped dangerously low, as was the trend throughout the Archdiocese of Los Angeles at that time. The buildings needed upgrading and there were discussions about selling the valuable property and moving to another site. The brothers contacted the nuns in charge of Corvallis to propose a merger but were rejected. Notre Dame announced it would admit girls starting from the 1983–84 academic year, a move which helped them to weather the decline in the enrollment encountered by other Catholic high schools in the San Fernando Valley area due to the aging population and competition from other private schools. When Corvallis closed in 1987, many of its girls transferred to Notre Dame.

== Demographics ==
The demographic breakdown of the 1,229 students enrolled for 2017–18 was:

- Native American/Alaskan = 0.6%
- Asian = 6.2%
- Black = 8.0%
- Hispanic = 17.3%
- Native Hawaiian/Pacific islander = 5.8%
- White = 62.2%

== Notable alumni ==
- Lily Aldridge – model
- Ed Begley Jr. – actor
- Rachel Bilson – actress
- John S. Boskovich – artist, writer, filmmaker, and teacher
- Joseph Vincent Brennan – Bishop of Fresno
- Nick Cassavetes – actor and director
- Dayne Crist – football player
- Patrick Curtis – motion picture/TV writer producer
- Chris Dickerson – Major League Baseball player
- Jamie Dixon – men's basketball coach at TCU.
- Maggie Dixon – women's basketball coach at U.S. Military Academy
- Terry Donahue – football player and coach
- Kirsten Dunst – actress
- Justin Fargas – NFL running back
- Maureen Flannigan – actress
- Tim Foli – MLB player
- Nick Folk – NFL kicker
- Kai Forbath – NFL kicker
- Caleb Foster - college basketball player
- Taylor Fry – actress
- Amanda Fuller – actress
- Tom Gamboa—baseball coach and manager
- Donald Gibb – actor
- Pat Gillick – baseball executive
- Greg Goossen – MLB player
- Ben Gottschalk – NFL football offensive lineman
- Hunter Greene – MLB pitcher
- Devon Gummersall – actor
- Cary Harris – football player
- Brett Hayes – MLB player
- Wes Horton – NFL defensive end
- Spencer Johnson – author
- Travis Johnson – NFL football defensive end
- Staci Keanan – actor
- Richard Keith – actor
- Emilee Klein – LPGA golfer
- David Kopay – football running back
- David C. Lane – professor of philosophy and sociology/author
- Harper LeBel – football player
- Rami Malek – actor
- Arash Markazi – journalist
- Rich Marotta – sports reporter
- Jerry Mathers – actor
- Jack McDowell – MLB pitcher, Cy Young Award Winner
- Stephen McEveety – film producer
- Katharine McPhee – singer
- Nigel Miguel – basketball player, film actor and producer
- Michael Minkler – motion picture soundman
- Bob Moretti – Speaker of California State Assembly
- Khalfani Muhammad – NFL running back
- Michael Mullen – admiral in U.S. Navy and Chairman of the Joint Chiefs of Staff
- Liliana Mumy – actress
- Daniel Munyer – NFL offensive lineman
- Dave Navarro – guitarist
- Kathryn Newton – actress
- Devon Odessa – actress
- Josh Oppenheimer – basketball player and coach
- Mark Pellegrino - actor
- Stephen Perkins – drummer
- Jorge Piedra – MLB player
- Brendan Ryan – MLB infielder
- Chris Sailer – pro football player
- C. J. Sanders – football player
- Bill Seward – radio-TV sportscaster
- Lindsey Shaw – actress
- Giancarlo Stanton – MLB outfielder 2017 NL MVP
- Tad Stones – animator, screenwriter, producer and director
- Jimmy Tatro – filmmaker
- Michelle Trachtenberg – actress
- John Vella – NFL offensive lineman.
- Jim Yester — singer and musician
- Dennis Zine – Los Angeles City Councilman
