= Jamie Dixon =

American basketball coach (born 1965)

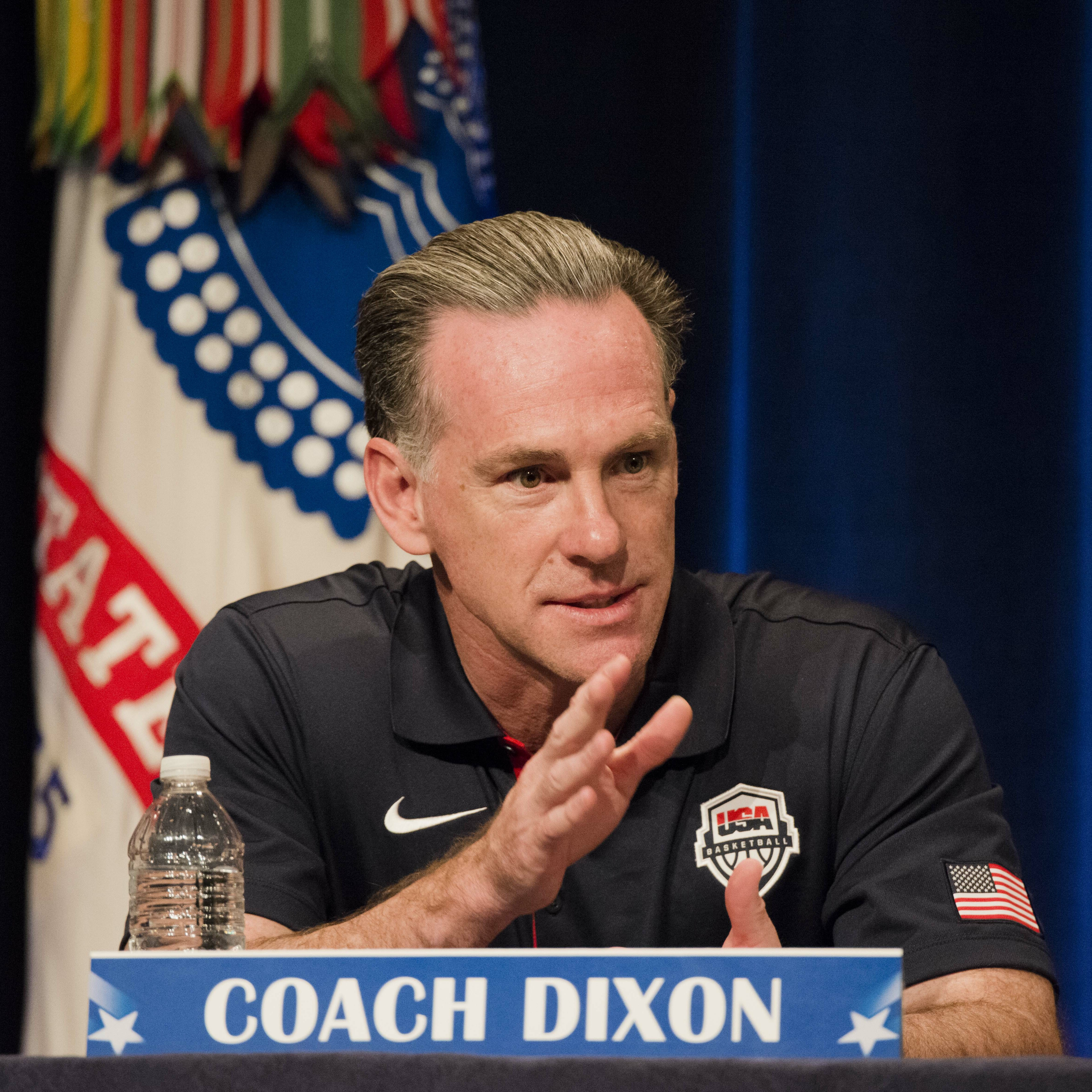
- Dixon in 2014

TCU Horned Frogs
- Title: Head coach
- League: Big 12 Conference

Personal information
- Born: November 10, 1965 (age 61) Burbank, California, U.S.
- Listed height: 6 ft 4 in (1.93 m)
- Listed weight: 175 lb (79 kg)

Career information
- High school: Notre Dame (Los Angeles, California)
- College: TCU (1983–1987)
- NBA draft: 1987: 7th round, 150th overall pick
- Drafted by: Washington Bullets
- Playing career: 1987–1990
- Position: Point guard
- Coaching career: 1989–present

Career history

Playing
- 1987–1988: La Crosse Catbirds
- 1989–1990: Hawke's Bay Hawks

Coaching
- 1989: Te Aute College
- 1989–1991: LA Valley CC (assistant)
- 1991–1992: UC Santa Barbara (assistant)
- 1992–1994: Hawaii (assistant)
- 1994–1998: Northern Arizona (assistant)
- 1998–1999: Hawaii (assistant)
- 1999–2003: Pittsburgh (assistant)
- 2003–2016: Pittsburgh
- 2016–present: TCU

Career highlights
- As player: NBL All-Star Five (1989, 1990); Second-team All-SWC (1987); As coach: NIT champion (2017); CBI champion (2012); Big East tournament champion (2008); 2× Big East regular season champion (2004, 2011); Sporting News Coach of the Year (2011); Jim Phelan National Coach of the Year (2010); Naismith College Coach of the Year (2009); Big East Coach of the Year (2004)
- Stats at Basketball Reference
Medals
Head coach for United States
FIBA U19 World Championship
Gold medal – first place	2009 Auckland
Gold medal – first place	2021 Latvia

James Patrick Dixon II (born November 10, 1965) is an American college basketball coach who is the head coach of the TCU Horned Frogs men's team, where he played college ball. He previously served as the head coach of the University of Pittsburgh men's basketball team from 2003 through 2016.

In 2009, he was the head coach for the FIBA Under-19 2009 gold-medal winning United States national basketball team for which he was named the 2009 USA Basketball National Coach of the Year. Dixon was named Big East Coach of the Year in 2004, Naismith College Coach of the Year in 2009, Jim Phelan National Coach of the Year in 2010, and the Sporting News National Coach of the Year award in 2011. Dixon played college basketball at Texas Christian University, was selected by the Washington Bullets in the 1987 NBA draft, and played professionally with the Continental Basketball Association's Lacrosse Catbirds and for Hawke's Bay Hawks of the New Zealand National Basketball League.

== Early life ==
Dixon was born in Los Angeles County in Burbank, California, to Marge and Jim Dixon. His father was an actor, screenwriter and producer. Dixon played basketball at Notre Dame High in Sherman Oaks, Los Angeles. As a freshman point guard, he was only 5-foot-3-inch (1.60 m) and was among the smallest in his class, but he grew 11 inches (28 cm) and graduated as the tallest. Dixon wanted to play college basketball at the University of California, Santa Barbara, but the UCSB Gauchos' top recruiter, assistant coach Ben Howland, decided not to sign him. He landed at Texas Christian University (TCU) instead.

== College career ==
With the TCU Horned Frogs, Dixon led the Southwest Conference in assists as a senior, when he earned all-conference honors and led the team to the 1987 NCAA tournament.

== Playing career ==
Dixon was selected in the seventh round of the 1987 NBA draft by the Washington Bullets (known now as the Washington Wizards). He was cut early by the team. He considered using his finance degree for a job earning $20,000 annually, but instead played with the La Crosse Catbirds in the Continental Basketball Association for $400 per week. In 1989, he moved to New Zealand and played for the Hawke's Bay Hawks in the National Basketball League. He played two seasons, earning All-Star Five honors in 1989 and 1990. His career ended in 1990 after he was injured playing in the Netherlands. He was accidentally kneed in the midsection while diving for a loose ball, and suffered a ruptured pancreas, a rare basketball injury. He spent 90 days in the hospital, unable to eat for weeks, and saw his weight drop by a quarter from 200 pounds (91 kg) to 150 (68).

== Coaching career ==
Dixon began his coaching career in 1989 as the head coach at Te Aute College, a secondary school in New Zealand, before serving as an assistant at Los Angeles Valley College from 1989 to 1991. After his playing career ended, he got a graduate assistant position at UCSB with the help of Howland, and later became an assistant coach at the University of Hawaii. Dixon then served as an assistant at Northern Arizona University under Howland, who had become a head coach. After a brief stint as an assistant at Hawaii under Riley Wallace, Dixon was reunited with Howland at Pitt in 1999. He was promoted as Pittsburgh's head coach when Howland left for UCLA following the 2002–03 season.

=== Pittsburgh ===
In 13 years at Pitt, Dixon had a record of 328–123. He won 188 games in his first seven seasons, tying the NCAA Division I record for most wins in the first seven seasons of a head coaching career. Previously, Dixon's 162nd win, which came in the 2009 NCAA tournament over Oklahoma State, broke the NCAA Division I record for most victories in the first six seasons as a head coach formerly held by former North Carolina State coach Everett Case. He was awarded the Naismith College Coach of the Year honors following the 2008–09 season.

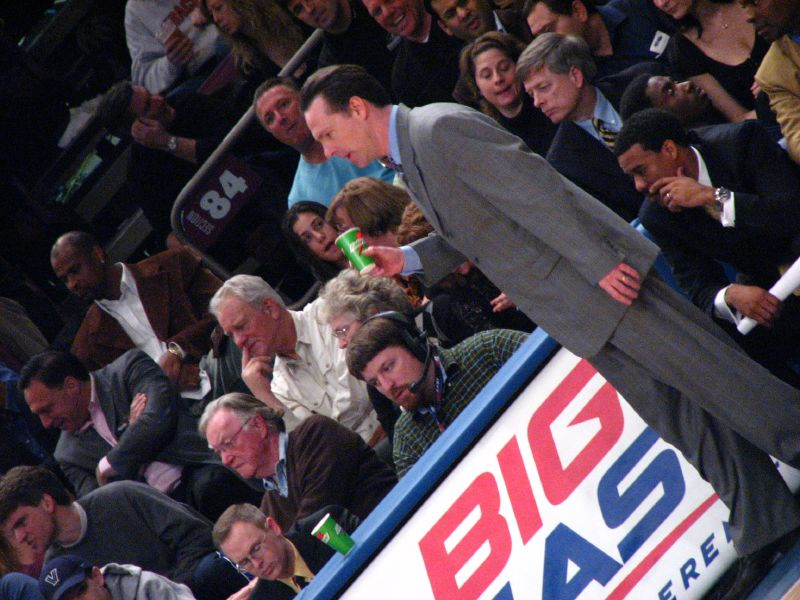
Jamie Dixon coaching during the Big East tournament

Dixon won Big East Coach of the Year honors in 2004 for leading Pitt to a school-record 31 wins and the Big East regular season championship. He took Pitt to the final game of the Big East men's basketball tournament in 2004, 2006, 2007 and 2008, winning the 2008 Big East tournament Championship against No.1 seed Georgetown. He is Pitt's first and only head coach to guide the Panthers to seven consecutive NCAA tournament appearances and seven consecutive seasons of at least 20 overall wins and 10 league wins. In the NCAA tournament, Dixon led Pitt to the Sweet Sixteen in 2004 and 2007 and to the Elite Eight in 2009, a year that saw his Panthers earn their first-ever No.1 rankings in the AP poll and Coaches' Poll, their first-ever victories over a No.1 ranked team (UConn, twice), and their first ever No.1 seed in the NCAA Tournament (East Region).

His success at Pitt continued through the 2010 season, perhaps his best coaching performance to date. The Panthers tied for second place in the Big East and earned a No.2 seed in the Big East tournament, despite being picked to finish 9th in the conference preseason poll. Dixon guided Pitt to yet another NCAA Tournament appearance, their seventh in his first seven years as head coach, and was awarded both the Big East Coach of the Year and Jim Phelan National Coach of the Year Awards by CollegeInsider.com. He is the first and only head coach in Pitt's history to lead his team to seven consecutive NCAA tournament appearances. At the end of the 2010 season, Dixon is the winningest coach in Big East history with a current .721 winning percentage in eight seasons of league games (98–38). He also stands second on Pitt's all-time wins list, behind only the legendary Doc Carlson.

On March 31, 2010, Pitt extended Dixon's contract by two years, through the 2017–18 season.

On April 2, 2010, Dixon was named the Jim Phelan National Coach of the Year by CollegeInsider.com.

On October 23, 2010, Dixon received national attention when he assisted in removing victims from a severe car accident in a Pittsburgh suburb.

On December 22, 2010, Dixon won his 200th game with a 61–46 win over American. With the victory, Dixon tied the all-time NCAA Division I record held by Mark Few and Roy Williams for the fastest coach to earn 200 wins by achieving the mark in only eight seasons. The achievement of winning his first 200 out of 255 games also ranked Dixon among the all-time top-15 for the quickest coaches to achieve 200 victories in regards to total number of games played.

On March 2, 2011, Dixon won his 214th game with a 66–50 win over South Florida. With the victory, Dixon broke the all-time NCAA record for the most wins in a coach's first eight seasons. Following the regular season, the Panthers received a Number 1 seed in the Southeast Region of the NCAA tournament, where the Panthers defeated 16th seed UNC Asheville. They were upset in the third round by Butler University.

Dixon was named the 2010–11 Sporting News National Coach of the Year.

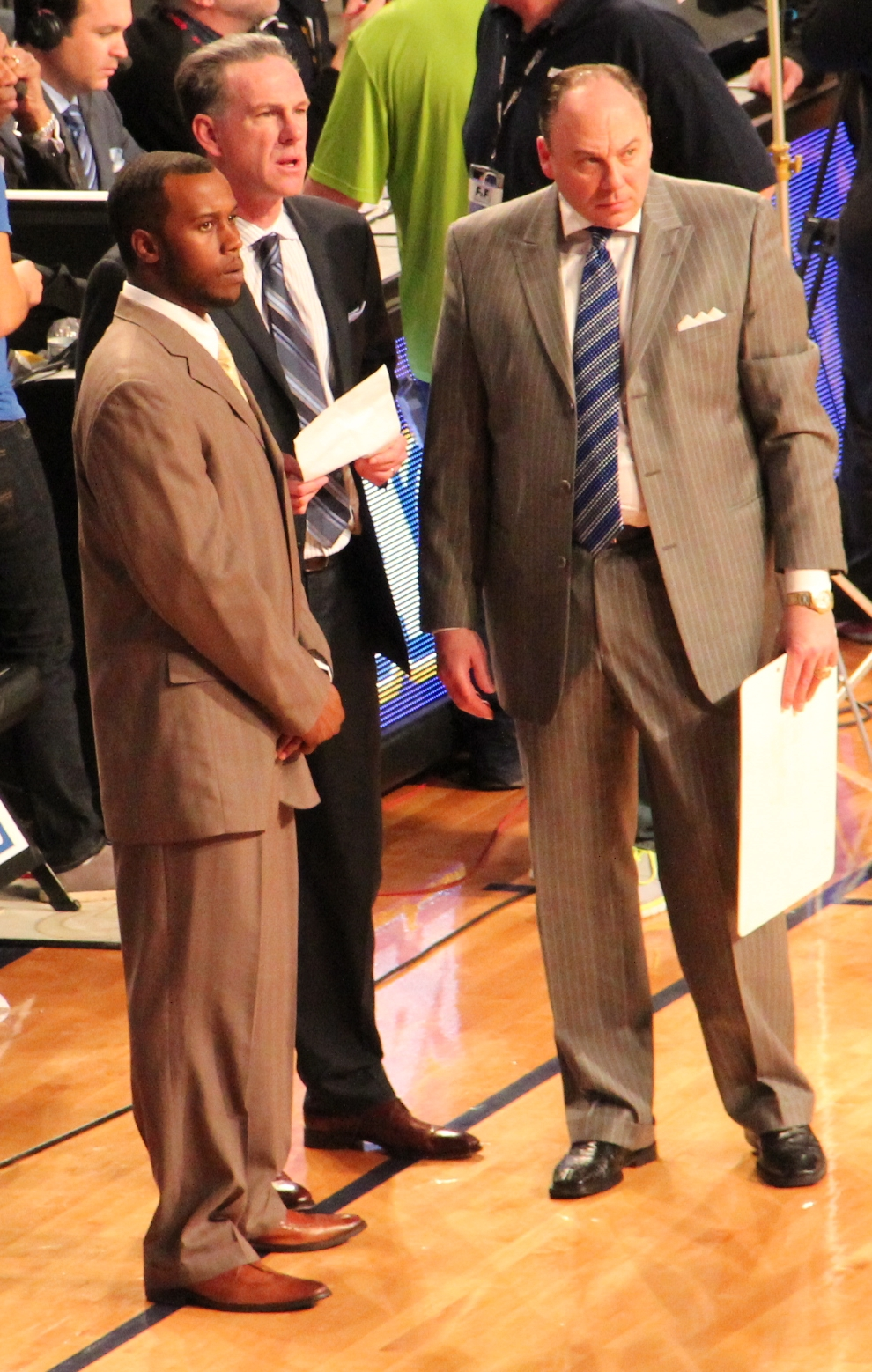
From left: Brandin Knight, Jamie Dixon and Barry Rohrssen at Hank McCamish Pavilion, 2014

Outside of basketball, Dixon has been credited with a peripheral role in the Big East's decision to invite TCU to become the conference's 17th member. Specifically, he suggested to TCU athletic director Chris Del Conte that the school pursue Big East membership during a conversation at the 2010 TCU–Baylor football game. TCU would end up going to the Big 12 Conference instead.

On March 23, 2013, Pitt would again extend Dixon's contract through the 2022–23 season. The University of Pittsburgh moved to the Atlantic Coast Conference following the 2012–13 season with Dixon finishing atop the all-time list of head coaches for best conference winning percentage (.658, combined conference regular season and conference tournament games) in Big East Conference history.

=== TCU ===
On March 21, 2016, Dixon accepted the head coaching position at his alma mater. In his first season in Fort Worth, he led the Horned Frogs to their best Big 12 conference record (6–12) since joining the league in 2012–13, their first-ever program win over a #1-ranked team, their first Big 12 Tournament semifinal game, and the NIT championship. In 2017–18, the school reached the NCAA Tournament for the first time in 20 years. The following season, Dixon coached them to their third straight 20-win season. The Horned Frogs continued a series of program firsts under Dixon, including winning a game in the NCAA Tournament in back-to-back years for the first time and making three consecutive Tournaments from 2022 to 2024.

=== United States ===
Dixon became the head coach of the United States under-19 men's national basketball team in 2009. That summer, he led the United States to its first gold medal in 18 years in the 2009 FIBA Under-19 World Championship held in Auckland, New Zealand. For this accomplishment, Dixon was later named USA Basketball Coach of the Year.

== Acting ==
Dixon is a member of the Screen Actors Guild. He starred in various commercials as a child and into his early twenties, including ads for Volvo, Rice Krispies, Mattel and Bud Light.

== Personal life ==
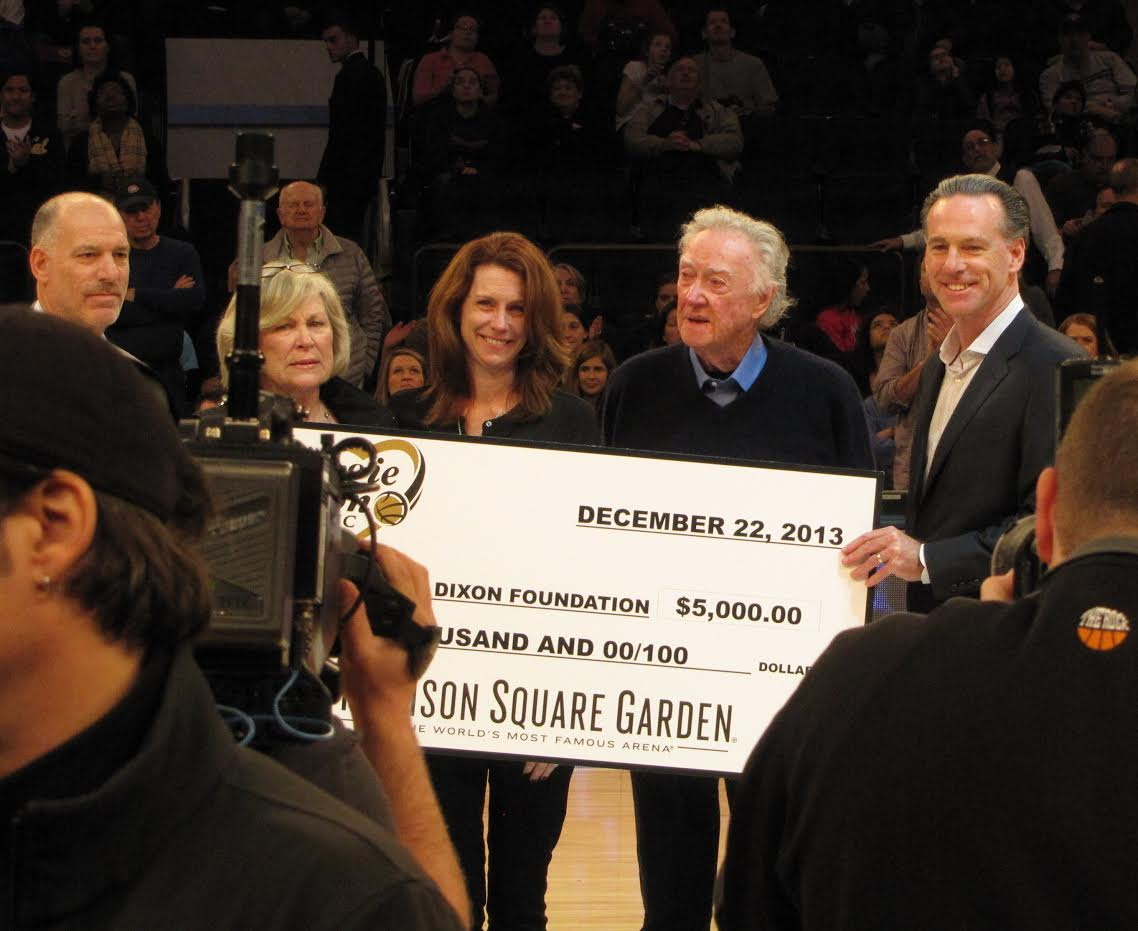
Jamie Dixon, in Madison Square Garden, along with his sister Julie and their parents, accepting a check from the Garden donated to the Maggie Dixon Fund during the Maggie Dixon Classic.

Dixon has 2 sisters: Julie and Maggie. Maggie died from heart conditions in 2006 at the age of 28. She was the coach for Army at the time of her death. The basketball tournament Maggie Dixon Classic is played in her honor.

Dixon is married to his wife Jacqueline, and they have a son, Jack, and a daughter, Shannon.

== Head coaching record ==
Record table
Season	Team	Overall	Conference	Standing	Postseason
Pittsburgh Panthers (Big East Conference) (2003–2013)
2003–04	Pittsburgh	31–5	13–3	1st	NCAA Division I Sweet 16
2004–05	Pittsburgh	20–9	10–6	5th	NCAA Division I Round of 64
2005–06	Pittsburgh	25–8	10–6	T–4th	NCAA Division I Round of 32
2006–07	Pittsburgh	29–8	12–4	T–2nd	NCAA Division I Sweet 16
2007–08	Pittsburgh	27–10	10–8	7th	NCAA Division I Round of 32
2008–09	Pittsburgh	31–5	15–3	T–2nd	NCAA Division I Elite Eight
2009–10	Pittsburgh	25–9	13–5	T–2nd	NCAA Division I Round of 32
2010–11	Pittsburgh	28–6	15–3	1st	NCAA Division I Round of 32
2011–12	Pittsburgh	22–17	5–13	T–13th	CBI Champion
2012–13	Pittsburgh	24–9	12–6	4th	NCAA Division I Round of 64
Pittsburgh Panthers (Atlantic Coast Conference) (2013–2016)
2013–14	Pittsburgh	26–10	11–7	5th	NCAA Division I Round of 32
2014–15	Pittsburgh	19–15	8–10	T–9th	NIT First Round
2015–16	Pittsburgh	21–12	9–9	T–9th	NCAA Division I Round of 64
Pittsburgh:		328–123 (.727)	143–81 (.638)		
TCU Horned Frogs (Big 12 Conference) (2016–present)
2016–17	TCU	24–15	6–12	T–7th	NIT Champion
2017–18	TCU	21–12	9–9	5th	NCAA Division I Round of 64
2018–19	TCU	23–14	7–11	T–7th	NIT Semifinal
2019–20	TCU	16–16	7–11	T–7th	
2020–21	TCU	12–14	5–11	8th	
2021–22	TCU	21–13	8–10	5th	NCAA Division I Round of 32
2022–23	TCU	22–13	9–9	T–5th	NCAA Division I Round of 32
2023–24	TCU	21–13	9–9	T–7th	NCAA Division I Round of 64
2024–25	TCU	16–16	9–11	T–9th	
2025–26	TCU	23–12	11–7	6th	NCAA Division I Round of 32
2026–27	TCU	1–0	0–0		
TCU:		200–138 (.592)	80–100 (.444)		
Total:		528–261 (.669)			
National champion Postseason invitational champion Conference regular season champion Conference regular season and conference tournament champion Division regular season champion Division regular season and conference tournament champion Conference tournament champion
