= Ben Gottschalk =

American football player (born 1992)

Profile
- Position: Center

Personal information
- Born: February 15, 1992 (age 34); Santa Monica, California, U.S.
- Listed height: 6 ft 5 in (1.96 m)
- Listed weight: 293 lb (133 kg)

Career information
- High school: Notre Dame (Sherman Oaks, California)
- College: SMU
- NFL draft: 2014: undrafted

Career history
- Kansas City Chiefs (2014)*; Tampa Bay Buccaneers (2015)*; San Francisco 49ers (2015)*; Tampa Bay Buccaneers (2015–2016)
- * Offseason or practice squad member only

Career NFL statistics
- Games played: 2
- Games started: 1
- Stats at Pro Football Reference

Ben Gottschalk (born February 15, 1992) is an American former professional football player who was a center in the National Football League (NFL). He played college football for the SMU Mustangs, and subsequently played in the NFL with the Tampa Bay Buccaneers.

== Early life ==
Gottschalk is Jewish, and is from Sherman Oaks, Los Angeles, California. He has two older brothers, Adam and William.

He was a three-star Rivals.com and Scout.com prospect out of Notre Dame High School (Sherman Oaks, California), Class of 2010. He was ranked as the 94th-best player in California and the 14th-best center in the US by Rivals, was All-CIF Pac-5 Division First-team, was a Serra League Most Valuable Lineman, and was a member of the 2008 GSP Super All-State Underclass Team. He also threw the shot put in the 2009 and 2010 seasons.

== College career ==
Gottschalk played college football at Southern Methodist University for the Mustangs, playing in 47 games, with 24 starts (starting all the team's games his junior and senior years), on the offensive line He was a member of the 2012 Jewish Sports Review college football All-American team.

== Professional career ==
=== Kansas City Chiefs ===
Gottschalk was signed as an undrafted free agent by the Kansas City Chiefs on May 19, 2014. On August 27, 2014, he was waived.

On August 31, 2014, he was signed to the Chiefs' practice squad. On September 9, 2014, he was waived.

=== Tampa Bay Buccaneers (first stint) ===
Gottschalk signed with the Tampa Bay Buccaneers on April 9, 2015. On May 28, 2015, he was waived.

=== San Francisco 49ers ===
On June 6, 2015, he was signed by the San Francisco 49ers to a two-year contract. On August 6, 2015, while injured he was waived a few days after undergoing foot surgery. On August 7, 2015, he was placed on injured reserve. On August 13, 2015, he was waived from injured reserve. The 49ers paid him an injury settlement worth $56,118.

=== Tampa Bay Buccaneers (second stint) ===
On November 25, 2015, Gottschalk was signed to the Buccaneers' practice squad. On January 5, 2016, he signed a reserve/future contract with the Buccaneers.

On September 3, 2016, Gottschalk was released by the Buccaneers as part of final roster cuts. The next day, he was signed to the Buccaneers' practice squad. On November 12, Gottschalk was promoted to the Buccaneers active roster. He suffered a knee injury in Week 11 and was placed on injured reserve on November 22, 2016. On May 1, 2017, he was waived by the Buccaneers.

== See also ==
- List of select Jewish football players
