= Notre Dame–UConn women's basketball rivalry =

American college basketball rivalry

- UConn Huskies Notre Dame Fighting Irish
- Sport: Women's basketball
- First meeting: January 18, 1996; Connecticut 87, Notre Dame 64
- Latest meeting: March 29, 2026; Connecticut 70, Notre Dame 52
- Next meeting: December 9, 2026; South Bend, Indiana

Statistics
- Total meetings: 57
- All-time series: Connecticut leads 41–16
- Largest victory: Connecticut, 85–47 (2026)
- Longest win streak: Connecticut, 12 (2005–2011)
- Current win streak: Connecticut, 2 (2026–present)

Locations of Notre Dame and UConn

The Notre Dame–UConn women's basketball rivalry is a college rivalry series between the UConn Huskies women's basketball team of the University of Connecticut and the Notre Dame Fighting Irish women's basketball team of the University of Notre Dame. The Huskies and Fighting Irish have met 57 times, including nine times in the NCAA Tournament and twice in the NCAA Championship, with the Huskies holding a 41–16 advantage.

Connecticut's 41 wins are the most for any opponent against Notre Dame. No other opponent has more than 30 wins against the Irish. Notre Dame's 16 wins are the most for any opponent against Connecticut. Tennessee is the only other program with double-digit wins against the Huskies (10).

== Background ==
The Connecticut Huskies and Notre Dame Fighting Irish women's basketball teams are two of the more successful teams in women's collegiate basketball. The UConn Huskies have won twelve national championships, while the Notre Dame Fighting Irish have nine Final Four appearances, with two National Championships in 2001 and 2018. Both teams formerly played in the Big East Conference, and appeared in the title game of the Big East tournament multiple times, with UConn appearing 23 times between 1989 and 2013, and Notre Dame appearing seven times in the same time period.

From April 2011 to March 2013, Notre Dame won seven out of its eight match-ups with UConn, the best performance of any team against UConn since Tennessee. However, Notre Dame fell to UConn in the 2013 NCAA Division I women's basketball tournament despite Notre Dame beating them three times during the regular season that year.

In 2014, UConn and Notre Dame both went into the national championship undefeated. This is the first time two undefeated teams went to the title game in men's and women's NCAA Division I basketball history. This was also their first meeting in a championship game. UConn won that game handily. The next year, both teams made it to the title game again, where UConn won its tenth national championship and third national championship in a row. New York Times reporter Harvey Araton observed that in this "latest showdown between the premier women’s programs" there was an "absence of the mutual hostility" that had characterized the previous year's matchup.

After seven consecutive wins by UConn over Notre Dame, the Irish beat the Huskies in the semifinals of the 2018 NCAA Division I women's basketball tournament. Despite losing in a regular season matchup the following year, Notre Dame defeated UConn again in the 2019 Final Four matchup 81–76. From the start of the 2011–2012 season to the end of the 2018–2019 season, UConn had only 15 losses, with eight of them coming against Notre Dame.

== Game results ==
| UConn victories | Notre Dame victories |

| No. | Date | Location | Winner | Score | Notes |
|---|---|---|---|---|---|
| 1 | January 18, 1996 | Notre Dame, IN | UConn | 87–64 | |
| 2 | February 24, 1996 | Storrs, CT | UConn | 86–79 | |
| 3 | March 5, 1996 | Storrs, CT | UConn | 71–54 | Big East tournament |
| 4 | February 9, 1997 | Storrs, CT | UConn | 72–49 | |
| 5 | March 4, 1997 | Storrs, CT | UConn | 86–77 | Big East tournament |
| 6 | December 6, 1997 | Notre Dame, IN | UConn | 78–59 | |
| 7 | February 21, 1998 | Storrs, CT | UConn | 73–61 | |
| 8 | March 2, 1998 | Piscataway, NJ | UConn | 73–53 | Big East tournament |
| 9 | December 8, 1998 | Notre Dame, IN | UConn | 106–81 | |
| 10 | March 2, 1999 | Piscataway, NJ | UConn | 96–75 | Big East tournament |
| 11 | February 26, 2000 | Storrs, CT | UConn | 77–59 | |
| 12 | January 15, 2001 | Notre Dame, IN | Notre Dame | 92–76 | |
| 13 | March 6, 2001 | Storrs, CT | UConn | 78–76 | Big East tournament |
| 14 | March 30, 2001 | St. Louis, MO | Notre Dame | 90–75 | NCAA Final Four |
| 15 | January 21, 2002 | Hartford, CT | UConn | 80–53 | |
| 16 | January 20, 2003 | Notre Dame, IN | UConn | 72–53 | |
| 17 | February 23, 2003 | Storrs, CT | UConn | 77–59 | |
| 18 | January 13, 2004 | Notre Dame, IN | Notre Dame | 66–51 | |
| 19 | January 12, 2005 | Notre Dame, IN | UConn | 67–50 | |
| 20 | January 30, 2005 | Storrs, CT | Notre Dame | 65–59 | |
| 21 | March 7, 2005 | Hartford, CT | UConn | 67–54 | Big East tournament |
| 22 | February 19, 2006 | Notre Dame, IN | UConn | 79–64 | |
| 23 | March 5, 2006 | Hartford, CT | UConn | 71–60 | Big East tournament |
| 24 | January 27, 2007 | Storrs, CT | UConn | 64–47 | |
| 25 | January 27, 2008 | Notre Dame, IN | UConn | 81–64 | |
| 26 | February 22, 2009 | Hartford, CT | UConn | 76–66 | |
| 27 | January 16, 2010 | Storrs, CT | UConn | 70–46 | |
| 28 | March 1, 2010 | Notre Dame, IN | UConn | 76–51 | |
| 29 | March 8, 2010 | Hartford, CT | UConn | 59–44 | Big East tournament |
| 30 | January 8, 2011 | Notre Dame, IN | UConn | 79–76 | |
| 31 | February 19, 2011 | Storrs, CT | UConn | 78–57 | |
| 32 | March 8, 2011 | Hartford, CT | UConn | 73–64 | Big East tournament |
| 33 | April 3, 2011 | Indianapolis, IN | Notre Dame | 72–63 | NCAA Final Four |
| 34 | January 7, 2012 | Notre Dame, IN | Notre Dame | 74–67 | OT |
| 35 | February 27, 2012 | Hartford, CT | Notre Dame | 72–59 | |
| 36 | March 6, 2012 | Hartford, CT | UConn | 63–54 | Big East tournament |
| 37 | April 1, 2012 | Denver, CO | Notre Dame | 83–75 | NCAA Final Four, OT |
| 38 | January 5, 2013 | Storrs, CT | Notre Dame | 73–72 | |
| 39 | March 4, 2013 | Notre Dame, IN | Notre Dame | 96–87 | 3OT |
| 40 | March 12, 2013 | Hartford, CT | Notre Dame | 61–59 | Big East tournament |
| 41 | April 7, 2013 | New Orleans, LA | UConn | 83–65 | NCAA Final Four |
| 42 | April 8, 2014 | Nashville, TN | UConn | 79–58 | NCAA Championship Game |
| 43 | December 6, 2014 | Notre Dame, IN | UConn | 76–58 | Jimmy V Women's Classic |
| 44 | April 7, 2015 | Tampa, FL | UConn | 63–53 | NCAA Championship Game |
| 45 | December 5, 2015 | Storrs, CT | UConn | 91–81 | Jimmy V Women's Classic |
| 46 | December 7, 2016 | Notre Dame, IN | UConn | 72–61 | |
| 47 | December 3, 2017 | Hartford, CT | UConn | 80–71 | Jimmy V Women's Classic |
| 48 | March 30, 2018 | Columbus, OH | Notre Dame | 91–89 | NCAA Final Four, OT |
| 49 | December 2, 2018 | Notre Dame, IN | UConn | 89–71 | Jimmy V Women's Classic |
| 50 | April 5, 2019 | Tampa, FL | Notre Dame | 81–76 | NCAA Final Four |
| 51 | December 8, 2019 | Storrs, CT | UConn | 81–57 | Jimmy V Women's Classic |
| 52 | December 5, 2021 | Storrs, CT | UConn | 73–54 | |
| 53 | December 4, 2022 | Notre Dame, IN | Notre Dame | 74–60 | Jimmy V Women's Classic |
| 54 | January 27, 2024 | Storrs, CT | Notre Dame | 82–67 | |
| 55 | December 12, 2024 | Notre Dame, IN | Notre Dame | 79–68 | |
| 56 | January 19, 2026 | Storrs, CT | UConn | 85–47 | |
| 57 | March 29, 2026 | Fort Worth, TX | UConn | 70–52 | NCAA Elite Eight |
Series: UConn leads 41–16
