= Maggie Dixon =

American basketball player and coach (1977–2006)

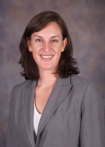
- Dixon in 2005

Biographical details
- Born: May 9, 1977; North Hollywood, California, U.S.
- Died: April 6, 2006 (aged 28); Valhalla, New York, U.S.

Playing career
- 1995–1999: San Diego
- Position: Guard/forward

Coaching career (HC unless noted)
- 2001–2005: DePaul (asst.)
- 2005–2006: Army

Administrative career (AD unless noted)
- 2000–2001: DePaul (dir. of ops.)

Head coaching record
- Overall: 20–11 (.645)
- Tournaments: 0–1 (NCAA)

Accomplishments and honors

Championships
- Patriot League Tournament (2006); Patriot League Regular Season (2006)

Margaret Mary Dixon (May 9, 1977 – April 6, 2006) was an American collegiate women's basketball coach.

== Life ==
Dixon was born in North Hollywood, California, and played basketball at Notre Dame High School. Dixon graduated in 1999 with a bachelor's degree in history from the University of San Diego, where she played for the women's basketball team. She served as team captain her senior year, and was voted as the "Most Improved Player". After an unsuccessful tryout for the WNBA Los Angeles Sparks, she took up coaching, at the urging of her older brother. After one season as director of operations, Dixon was an assistant coach at DePaul University from 2001 to 2005 under Doug Bruno.

In 2005, just 11 days before the 2005–2006 season, Dixon was hired as the women's basketball coach of the United States Military Academy. In her first year, they surprised the college basketball world by going 20–11 and winning the Patriot League conference tournament; she took them to 2006 NCAA Women's Division I Basketball Tournament as a 15 seed, where they lost to the University of Tennessee, 102–54. It was the first NCAA tournament appearance for any Army basketball team.

Her brother is Jamie Dixon, the head men's basketball coach at Texas Christian University. In 2006, the Dixons became the first brother-sister pair to take teams to the NCAA basketball tournaments the same year, as Jamie's Pittsburgh Panthers also made the 2006 NCAA Men's Division I Basketball Tournament. Her brother lost in the second round to Bradley.

== Death ==
After her team lost their first round game, Dixon attended the men's Final Four in Indianapolis, then flew to the women's Final Four in Boston. She attended a Nike party in Boston on Monday, April 3 with a number of other coaches, including Geno Auriemma, and WBCA president Doug Bruno. The following day, Dixon returned to West Point, where she watched the women's final game with her brother. The following day, she collapsed and was rushed to the base hospital. She was next airlifted to Westchester Medical Center in nearby Valhalla, New York.

Doug Bruno changed his flight plans to fly to New York to see his former assistant. She was still alive when Bruno arrived, but she died the following day from what her brother described as an "arrhythmic episode to her heart. She was 28 years old." An autopsy revealed that Dixon had an enlarged heart and had a problem with a heart valve.

== Tributes ==
Dixon was buried at the West Point Cemetery, an honor usually reserved only for high-ranking officials.

=== Maggie Dixon Classic ===
On November 12, 2006, West Point held the 1st Annual Maggie Dixon Classic, a basketball mini-tournament in Dixon's honor. It featured two games, a men's and women's game. In the men's game Jamie Dixon's Pitt Panthers defeated Western Michigan and in the women's game the Army women's team lost to Ohio State. The games were televised by ESPNU. The Maggie Dixon Classic also incorporates fundraising for heart arrhythmia research and a Health Fair featuring information booths and free screenings.

In the 2007–2008 season the Classic moved to Madison Square Garden and featured the University of Pittsburgh women's team against Duke University and Army against the Rutgers Scarlet Knights.

The third Maggie Dixon Classic was again played at MSG and featured the UConn Huskies and Penn State Nittany Lions along with an RU/Army Rematch. The presence of UConn helped draw upwards of 10,000 fans.

The 2009 Maggie Dixon Classic featured games between Baylor and Boston College and between perennial women's basketball powerhouses Rutgers and Tennessee.

The 2010 Maggie Dixon Classic pitted the Rutgers Scarlet Knights against the Texas A&M Aggies, and the Connecticut Huskies against the Ohio State Buckeyes.

The Maggie Dixon Surf 'N Slam Classic is played at Dixon's alma mater, University of San Diego, and has featured such schools as Boston College, DePaul, University of Texas, and University of California in recent years. The University of San Diego Toreros won the tournament in 2008 and 2009.

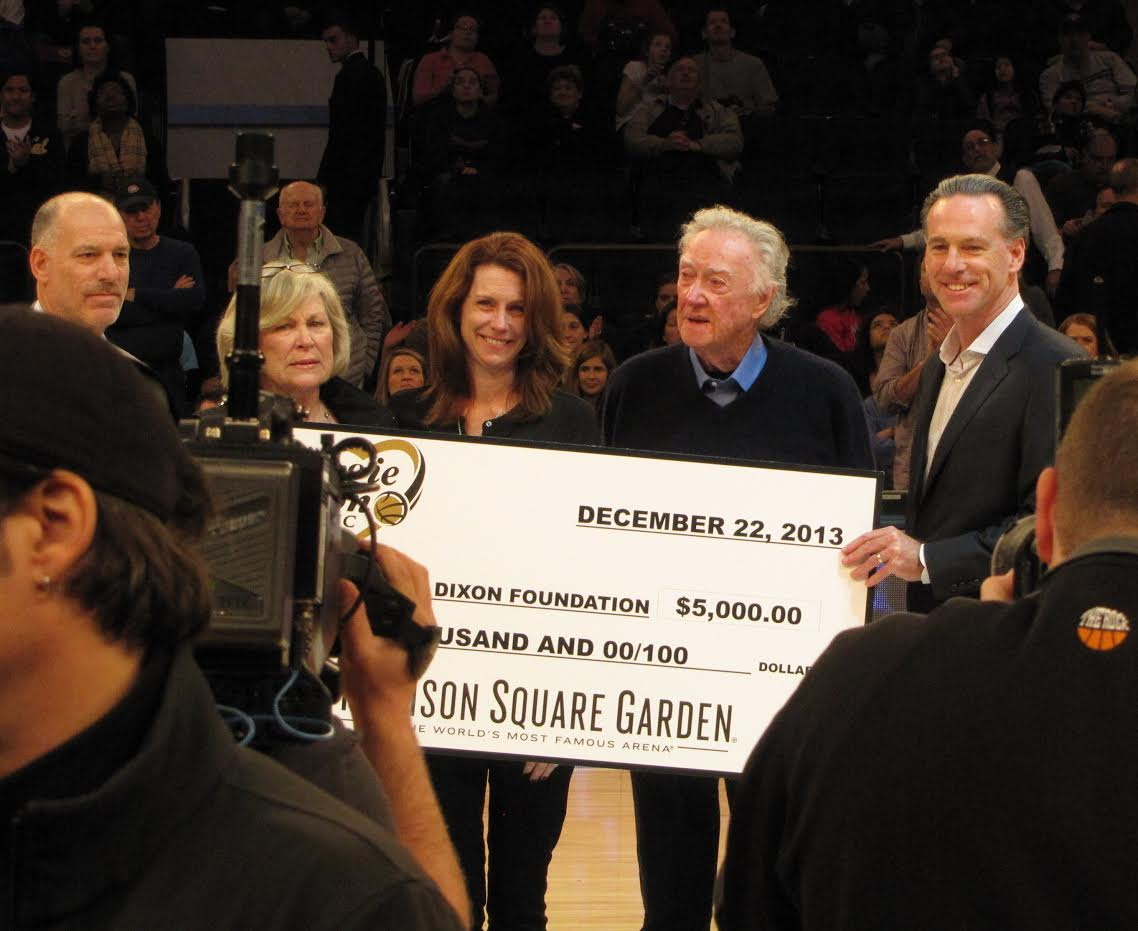
Jamie Dixon, in Madison Square Garden, along with his sister Julie and their parents, accepting a check from the Garden donated to the Maggie Dixon Fund during the Maggie Dixon Classic.

=== Maggie Dixon Award ===
In tribute to Maggie's rookie turnaround at Army before her death, the Women's Basketball Coaches Association announced the creation of the Maggie Dixon Award for the 2006–2007 season. The award is a "rookie of the year" award for the best coach in their first year as a Division 1 head coach.

The inaugural award was given to Krista Kilburn-Steveskey of Hofstra University and the 2007–2008 award was given to Jeff Walz of the University of Louisville. The 2008–2009 recipient was Kelly Packard of Ball State University.

The 2009–2010 season clarified the award by excluding former professional coaches moving to D1 (two early candidates were Men's coaching great and WNBA champion Paul Westhead at Oregon and 2 time WNBA champion Michael Cooper at USC). The award went to playing great Teresa Weatherspoon despite her coaching several games for Louisiana Tech in 2009 as an interim head coach. She won the Western Athletic Conference tournament returning the Lady Techsters to the NCAA Tournament for the first time in five seasons.

== Career statistics ==
Legend
GP	Games played	GS	Games started	MPG	Minutes per game	RPG	Rebounds per game
APG	Assists per game	SPG	Steals per game	BPG	Blocks per game	PPG	Points per game
TO	Turnovers per game	FG%	Field-goal percentage	3P%	3-point field-goal percentage	FT%	Free-throw percentage
**Bold**	Career best	°	League leader

=== College ===
Year	Team	GP	GS	MPG	FG%	3P%	FT%	RPG	APG	SPG	BPG	TO	PPG
1995–96	San Diego	**28**	-	-	37.0	0.0	61.9	1.4	0.8	0.4	0.2	-	2.4
1996–97	San Diego	26	-	-	36.6	0.0	51.7	2.7	0.9	0.6	0.3	-	3.4
1997–98	San Diego	27	-	-	44.8	25.0	66.7	**4.6**	0.7	0.3	**0.1**	-	5.3
1998–99	San Diego	22	-	-	**52.0**	**36.4**	**75.0**	4.2	**1.4**	**0.7**	0.2	-	**6.4**
**Career**		103	-	-	43.1	25.0	65.4	3.2	0.9	0.5	0.2	-	4.3
Statistics retrieved from Sports-Reference.

== Head coaching record ==
Record table
Season	Team	Overall	Conference	Standing	Postseason
**Army Black Knights** (Patriot League) (2005–2006)
2005–06	Army	20–11	11–3	1st	NCAA First Round
Total:		20–11			
National champion Postseason invitational champion Conference regular season champion Conference regular season and conference tournament champion Division regular season champion Division regular season and conference tournament champion Conference tournament champion

== See also ==
- Jamie Dixon (born 1965), older brother and current coach of the TCU Horned Frogs.
