= 2026–27 Army Black Knights women's basketball team =

American college basketball season

2026–27 Army Black Knights women's basketball
- Conference: Patriot League
- Record: 5–1 (0–0 Patriot)
- Head coach: Katie Kuester (2nd season)
- Associate head coach: Maggie Gallagher
- Assistant coaches: Amber Raisner; Mary Sheehan; Janelle Harrison
- Home arena: Christl Arena

2026–27 Patriot League women's basketball standings
	Conf.				Overall
Team	W		L	PCT	W		L	PCT
Army	0	–	0	–	5	–	1	.833
Navy	0	–	0	–	4	–	2	.667
Holy Cross	0	–	0	–	3	–	2	.600
Boston University	0	–	0	–	2	–	3	.400
Colgate	0	–	0	–	2	–	3	.400
Lehigh	0	–	0	–	2	–	3	.400
Loyola	0	–	0	–	2	–	3	.400
Bucknell	0	–	0	–	1	–	4	.200
Lafayette	0	–	0	–	1	–	4	.200
American	0	–	0	–	0	–	4	.000
† 2027 Patriot League tournament winner As of November 22, 2026

The 2026–27 Army Black Knights women's basketball team currently represents the United States Military Academy during the 2026–27 NCAA Division I women's basketball season. The Black Knights, led by second-year head coach Katie Kuester, play their home games at Christl Arena in West Point, New York, and compete as a member of the Patriot League.

== Previous season ==
The Black Knights finished the 2025–26 season 26–8 overall and 14–4 in Patriot League play, finishing in a tie for second in the conference Holy Cross. As the No. 3 seed in the Patriot League tournament, they defeated No. 6 seed Lafayette 65–57 in the quarterfinals before losing in the semifinals 55–61 to the No. 2 seeded Crusaders.

Following the Patriot League tournament, the Black Knights earned and accepted an at-large bid to the WNIT, appearing for the second straight season. They defeated NJIT 59–52 and La Salle 74–63 in the first and second rounds respectively, before losing to eventual champions Marshall 65–82 in the Super 16 to end their season.

== Offseason ==
=== Departures ===
Army departures
Name	Num.	Pos.	Height	Year	Hometown	Reason for departure
Reese Ericson	21	Guard	5'6"	Senior	Lake Oswego, OR	Graduated
Soleil Montrose	35	Guard/Forward	5'10"	Junior	Irvine, CA	Graduated

=== Incoming transfers ===
There were no incoming transfers for the 2026–27 season.

=== Recruiting class ===
There was no 2026 recruiting class.

== Preseason ==
On October 1, 2026, the Patriot League released their annual preseason coaches poll. Army was picked to finish second in the conference.

=== Preseason rankings ===
Patriot League Preseason Poll
Place	Team	Votes
1	Navy	81 (9)
2	Army	71
3	Lehigh	67 (1)
4	Holy Cross	53
5	Lafayette	52
6	Bucknell	37
7	Boston University	26
8	Colgate	22
9	Loyola Maryland	21
10	American	20
(#) first-place votes

=== Preseason All-Patriot League Team ===
Preseason All-Patriot League Team
Player	Year	Position
Kya Smith	Senior	Forward
Camryn Tade	Senior	Guard

== Roster ==
2026–27 Army Black Knights women's basketball team
Players
Coaches

Pos.	#	Name	Height	Year	Previous school	Hometown
G	0	Nakia Ollivierre	5 ft 9 in (1.75 m)	Fr	Waterloo West High School	Waterloo, IA
G	1	Daniela Maletsky	5 ft 10 in (1.78 m)	Fr	Red Bank Catholic High School	Freehold, NJ
G	2	Audrey Annee	5 ft 9 in (1.75 m)	Jr	Center Grove High School	Indianapolis, IN
G	3	Brooke Wilson	5 ft 9 in (1.75 m)	Jr	Archbishop John Carroll High School	Bryn Mawr, PA
G	4	Stella Chartrand	5 ft 9 in (1.75 m)	Jr	The Westminster Schools	Atlanta, GA
F	7	Addison Ainsworth	6 ft 0 in (1.83 m)	Jr	Black Hills High School	Olympia, WA
F	10	Reganne Readron	6 ft 1 in (1.85 m)	So	St. Ignatius College Preparatory	Chicago, IL
G	11	Kelly Cramer	5 ft 8 in (1.73 m)	So	St. Joseph Academy	Ponte Vedra, FL
F	12	Jane Preston	6 ft 2 in (1.88 m)	So	Conestoga High School	Berwyn, PA
G	13	Lilly Thoman	5 ft 6 in (1.68 m)	Fr	The Steward School	Midlothian, VA
G	14	Jane Rape	6 ft 1 in (1.85 m)	Fr	Oakdale High School (USMAPS)	Frederick, MD
G	15	Landry Sherrer	5 ft 8 in (1.73 m)	So	Coppell High School	Coppell, TX
G	20	Camryn Tade	5 ft 9 in (1.75 m)	Sr	Carroll High School	Southlake, TX
F	21	Allie Swindell	6 ft 1 in (1.85 m)	Fr	Prestonwood Christian Academy (USMAPS)	Celina, TX
G/F	22	Taylor Wilson	5 ft 10 in (1.78 m)	Sr	Archbishop John Carroll High School	Bryn Mawr, PA
F	23	Sam Tillson	6 ft 1 in (1.85 m)	Jr	McKinney High School	McKinney, TX
G	24	Julia Sedora	5 ft 8 in (1.73 m)	Fr	Red Lion High School	Red Lion, PA
F	30	Kya Smith (C)	6 ft 1 in (1.85 m)	Sr	Coronado High School	Lubbock, TX
G/F	33	Fiona Hastick (C)	5 ft 11 in (1.8 m)	Sr	Paul VI Catholic High School (USMAPS)	Reston, VA

Head coach

- Katie Kuester (Saint Joseph's)

Assistant coach(es)

- Maggie Gallagher (Marist)
- Amber Raisner (Union College)
- Mary Sheehan (Saint Joseph's)
- Janelle Harrison (Hartford)

Legend

- (C) Team captain
- (S) Suspended
- (I) Ineligible
- (W) Walk-on
- Injured
- Current redshirt

Roster
Last update: October 30, 2026

== Schedule and results ==
Date time, TV	Rank^{#}	Opponent^{#}	Result	Record	High points	High rebounds	High assists	Site (attendance) city, state
Exhibition
October 25, 2026*; 4:00 p.m., UConn+		at No. 2 UConn	L 50–86		15 – Reardon	8 – Tade	4 – Smith	Harry A. Gampel Pavilion (10,244); Storrs, CT
Non-conference regular season
November 2, 2026*; 6:00 p.m., ESPN+		St. Thomas Aquinas	W 81–28	1–0	16 – Smith	6 – Smith	4 – Wilson	Christl Arena (582); West Point, NY
November 5, 2026*; 7:00 p.m., ESPN+		at Brown	W 81–56	2–0	22 – Smith	10 – Smith	5 – Smith	Pizzitola Sports Center (389); Providence, RI
November 11, 2026*; 6:00 p.m., ESPN+		George Mason	W 80–75 ^{OT}	3–0	19 – Smith	8 – Smith	6 – Tade	Christl Arena (973); West Point, NY
November 14, 2026*; 3:30 p.m., ESPN+		St. Thomas	W 57–39	4–0	–	–	–	Christl Arena; West Point, NY
November 17, 2026*; 5:00 p.m., ESPN+		at UMass	L 49–60	4–1	–	–	–	Mullins Center; Amherst, MA
November 19, 2026*; 6:00 p.m., ESPN+		at Siena	W 54–41	5–1	–	–	–	UHY Center; Loudonville, NY
November 27, 2026*; 7:00 p.m., ACCNX		at North Carolina						Carmichael Arena; Chapel Hill, NC
November 29, 2026*; 2:00 p.m., ESPN+		at High Point						Qubein Center; High Point, NC
December 2, 2026*; 3:00 p.m., ESPN+		Binghamton						Christl Arena; West Point, NY
December 5, 2026*; 3:00 p.m., MW+		at Air Force						Clune Arena; Colorado Springs, CO
December 10, 2026*; 6:00 p.m., ESPN+		at Penn State						Bryce Jordan Center; State College, PA
Patriot League regular season
December 30, 2026; 6:00 p.m., ESPN+		Holy Cross						Christl Arena; West Point, NY
January 2, 2027; 1:00 p.m., ESPN+		Loyola Maryland						Christl Arena; West Point, NY
January 6, 2027; 6:00 p.m., ESPN+		at Lehigh						Stabler Arena; Bethlehem, PA
January 9, 2027; 1:00 p.m., ESPN+		Colgate						Christl Arena; West Point, NY
January 13, 2027; 6:00 p.m., ESPN+		at Bucknell						Sojka Pavilion; Lewisburg, PA
January 16, 2027; 1:00 p.m., ESPN+		at Lafayette						Kirby Sports Center; Easton, PA
January 20, 2027; 6:00 p.m., ESPN+		Lehigh						Christl Arena; West Point, NY
January 23, 2027; 11:00 a.m., CBSSN		Navy						Christl Arena; West Point, NY
January 27, 2027; 6:00 p.m., ESPN+		at Holy Cross						Hart Center Arena; Worcester, MA
January 30, 2027; 1:00 p.m., ESPN+		Bucknell						Christl Arena; West Point, NY
February 3, 2027; 6:00 p.m., ESPN+		at American						Bender Arena; Washington, D.C.
February 6, 2027; 2:00 p.m., ESPN+		at Boston University						Case Gym; Boston, MA
February 10, 2027; 11:00 a.m., ESPN+		Lafayette						Christl Arena; West Point, NY
February 13, 2027; 2:00 p.m., ESPN+		at Colgate						Cotterell Court; Hamilton, NY
February 17, 2027; 6:00 p.m., ESPN+		American						Christl Arena; West Point, NY
February 20, 2027; 11:00 a.m., CBSSN		at Navy						Alumni Hall; Annapolis, MD
February 23, 2027; 7:00 p.m., CBSSN		at Loyola Maryland						Reitz Arena; Baltimore, MD
February 26, 2027; 6:00 p.m., ESPN+		Boston University						Christl Arena; West Point, NY
Patriot League tournament
March 1–9, 2027; TBA								
*Non-conference game. ^{#}Rankings from AP Poll. (#) Tournament seedings in parentheses. All times are in Eastern.
