= UNC Asheville Bulldogs =

Collegiate sports club in the United States

- University: University of North Carolina at Asheville
- Nickname: Bulldogs
- NCAA: Division I
- Conference: Big South (primary); CCSA (women's swimming & diving)
- Athletic director: Janet Cone
- Location: Asheville, North Carolina
- Varsity teams: 12
- Basketball arena: Kimmel Arena
- Baseball stadium: Greenwood Baseball Field
- Soccer stadium: Greenwood Soccer Field
- Colors: Royal blue and white
- Mascot: Rocky
- Website: uncabulldogs.com
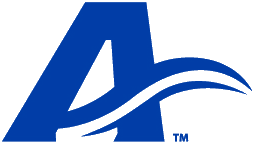

The UNC Asheville Bulldogs are the athletic teams that represent the University of North Carolina at Asheville (UNCA). They participate in Division I of the NCAA and are a member of the Big South Conference. UNCA fields varsity teams in 12 sports, 6 for men and 6 for women.

== Sports sponsored ==
UNCA competes in the NCAA in the following sports:

Men's sports	Women's sports
Baseball	Basketball
Basketball	
Cross country	Golf
Soccer	Soccer
Tennis	Swimming^{1}
Track and Field	Tennis
	Track and Field
	Volleyball
^{1} – competes as a member of the ASUN

== Athletic facilities ==
- Crowne Plaza Tennis Center: Home of UNCA tennis.
- Greenwood Baseball Field: Completed in the spring of 1988, home of UNCA baseball. Capacity for 300 people.
- Greenwood Soccer Field: Opened in 1989, capacity for 1,000 people. Home of UNCA soccer.
- Kimmel Arena: Home of UNCA basketball and volleyball from 2011, replaces the smaller Justice Center. Holds 3,400 people.
- Karl Straus Track: Home of UNCA's track and field programs.

== Championships ==
=== Team national championships ===
In 1984, the UNC Asheville women's basketball team won the NAIA national championship.

- Women's (1)
  - Basketball (1): 1984

=== Baseball ===
- Big South tournament (1): 2006

=== Men's basketball ===
- Big South regular season (8): 1997, 1998, 2002 (shared with Winthrop), 2008 (shared with Winthrop), 2012, 2017, 2018, 2023
- Big South tournament (6): 1989, 2003, 2011, 2012, 2016, 2023

UNC Asheville men's basketball won at least 15 games in a season for a league-record 11 consecutive seasons from the 2007-08 season until the 2017-18 season. UNC Asheville's 11th straight 15 or more win season allowed the Bulldogs to pass the old mark of 10 it shared with Winthrop (1998-08).

=== Women's basketball ===
UNC Asheville is a member of the Big South Conference

- NAIA National Champions (1): 1984
- Big South regular season (1): 2016
- Big South tournament (3): 2007, 2016, 2017

=== Men's soccer ===
- Big South regular season (1): 2001

=== Women's soccer ===
- Big South regular season (2): 2004, 2005
- Big South tournament (2): 1995, 2006

=== Women's tennis ===
- Big South regular season (1): 2023

=== Women's volleyball ===
- National Invitational Volleyball Championship (NIVC) champions (1): 1991
- Big South regular season (5): 1990, 1991 (shared), 1992, 2002, 2009
- Big South tournament (2): 1991, 1992
