= Botham =

Botham is a surname and given name. People with the name include:

== Surname ==
- A family of British sportspeople:
  - Lord Ian Botham (born 1955), English cricketer and sports commentator; family patriarch
  - Liam Botham (born 1977), English rugby union, rugby league, and cricket player; son of Sir Ian
  - James Botham (born 1998), Welsh rugby union player; son of Liam
- Les Botham (1930–1999), Australian cricketer
- Noel Botham (1940–2012), British tabloid journalist and author
- Roy Botham (1923–2007), British swimmer
- Sandy Botham (born 1965), American basketball coach
- Mary Botham Howitt (1799–1888), English poet

== Given name ==
- Botham Jean (1991–2018), Saint Lucian / American accountant and murder victim
