= Portland Pilots women's basketball =

Portland Pilots women's basketball team
2026–27 Portland Pilots women's basketball team
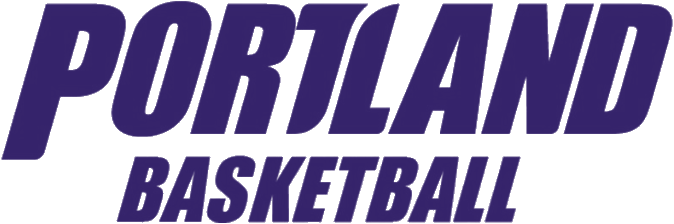
- University: University of Portland
- Head coach: Michael Meek (8th season)
- Location: Portland, Oregon
- Arena: Chiles Center (capacity: 4,852)
- Conference: West Coast Conference
- Nickname: Pilots
- Colors: Purple and white

NCAA Division I tournament appearances
- 1994, 1995, 1996, 1997, 2023, 2024

Conference tournament champions
- 1994, 2020, 2023, 2024

Conference regular-season champions
- 1992, 1996, 1997, 2025

Uniforms
Home	Away

The Portland Pilots women's basketball is the team representing the University of Portland, which is located in Portland, Oregon, United States, in NCAA Division I basketball competition. They play their home games at the Chiles Center and are currrently members of the West Coast Conference.

== History ==
Portland began play in 1977. They played in the NAIA Tournament from 1983 to 1985, finishing 3rd in 1983 and losing to UNC Asheville in the 1984 final and losing in the Quarterfinals in 1985. They joined Division I in 1986 and played in the West Coast Conference beginning in 1988. They made the NCAA tournament four straight years from 1994 to 1997, winning the WCC conference title in 1994 while getting at-large bids in the next three years, going 23–7, 23–7, and 27–3 with a perfect regular season conference record in 1997, losing in the conference tournament to San Francisco each time. In 2020, they won their second conference title, which qualified them for the cancelled 2020 NCAA Tournament. They have made the Women's National Invitation Tournament in 1999 and 2009 along with two Women's Basketball Invitational appearances in 2010 and 2021.

They have lost in the first round in each of their postseason appearances, with a 67–63 loss to Washington in 1999 being their closest loss. As of the end of the 2015–16 season, the Pilots have an all-time record of 562–553.

In 2026, Alex Fowler became the first Pilot alumna to play in the WNBA after signing a developmental player contract with the New York Liberty.

== Postseason ==
=== NCAA Division I ===
Year	Seed	Round	Opponent	Result
1994	#15	First round	#2 Southern Cal	L 62−77
1995	#13	First round	#4 Purdue	L 59−74
1996	#13	First round	#4 Texas Tech	L 61−78
1997	#9	First round	#8 Michigan State	L 70−75
2020	Cancelled due to COVID-19 pandemic			
2023	#12	First round	#5 Oklahoma	L 63−85
2024	#13	First round	#4 Kansas State	L 65−78

=== NAIA Division I ===
The Pilots made the NAIA division I women's basketball tournament three times, with a combined record of 5–4.

Year	Seed	Round	Opponent	Result
1983	#2	First round Quarterfinals; Third-place game	#7 Wayland Baptist #6 Alabama–Huntsville #4 UMKC	W, 65–60; L, 67–73; L, 65–85
1984	#3	First round Quarterfinals; Semifinals; National Championship	NR Wisconsin–Milwaukee #6 Francis Marion #7 Berry; NR UNC Asheville	W, 74–63; W, 91–79; W, 72–58; L, 70–72 (OT)
1985	#2	First round Second round	NR Indiana Tech; NR Midland Lutheran	W, 79–59; L, 64–67

== See also ==
- Women's sports in Portland, Oregon
