= Maggie Dixon Award =

American women's collegiate basketball coach award

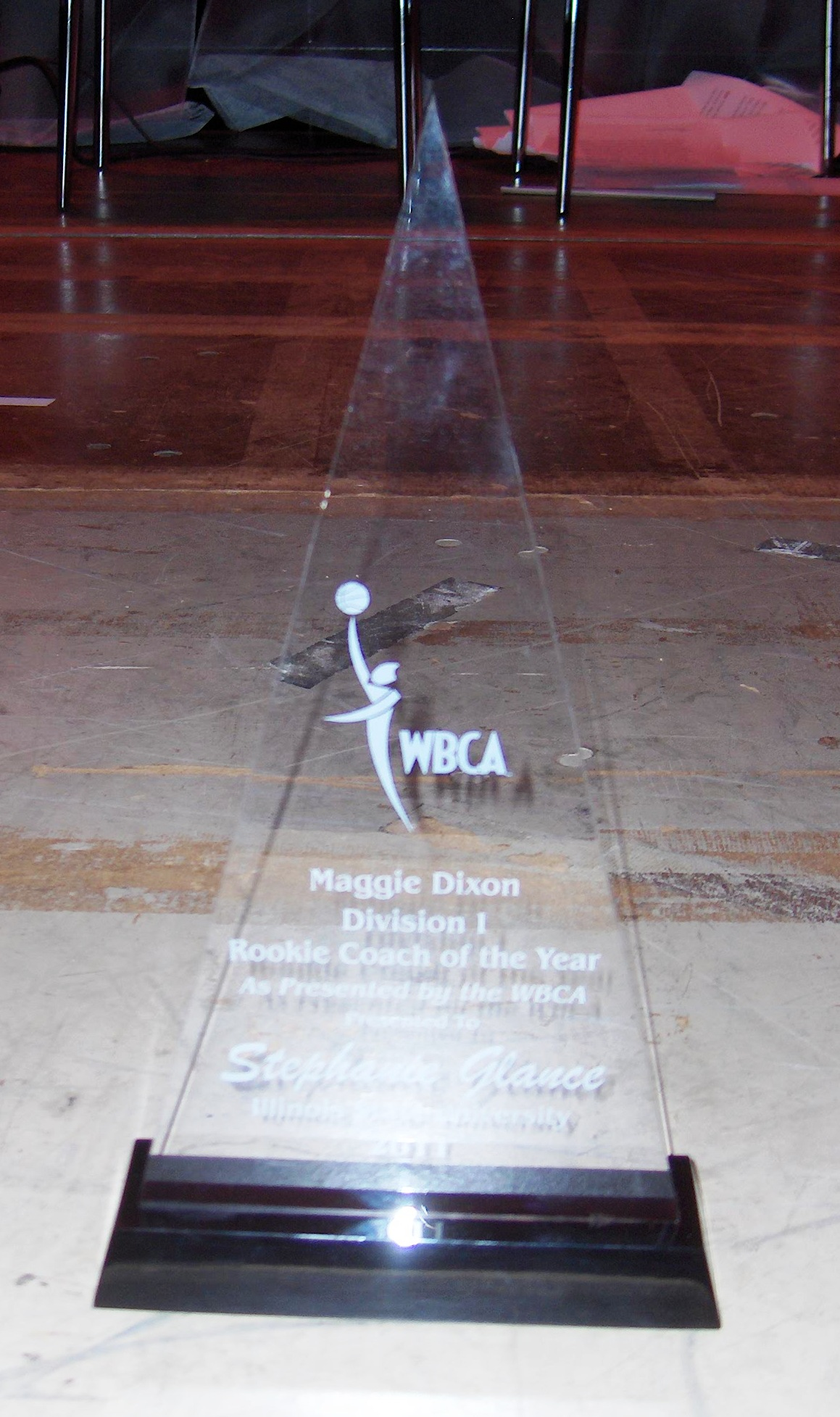
- Awarded for: the nation's top NCAA Division I rookie head coach
- Country: United States
- Presented by: Women's Basketball Coaches Association
- First award: 2007
- Currently held by: Katie Kuester, Army
- Website: Official site

The Maggie Dixon Division I Rookie Coach of the Year Award is an award given annually since 2007 to the head coach in women's college basketball in the NCAA Division I competition who achieves great success in their first year as a Division I head coach. Given by the Women's Basketball Coaches Association, the award is named for former women's head coach Maggie Dixon, who coached at Army for the 2005–06 season before suddenly dying due to valve complications from an enlarged heart. Dixon had been named head coach just 11 days before the start of the season but led the Black Knights to a 20–11 record and won the Patriot League tournament championship. It was Army's first basketball team, men or women, to play in the NCAA Tournament. Although Army would lose in the first round to Tennessee, Dixon was named the Patriot League Coach of the Year and received much praise from the college basketball community for her coaching job in just her first season. On April 6, 2006, Dixon died at the age of 28 of what her brother Jamie Dixon, then head men's basketball coach at Pittsburgh, described as an "arrhythmic episode to her heart."

== Definition of "rookie" ==
The WBCA defines a "rookie" coach as being in the coach's first season as a Division I head coach. However, coaches at programs that have transitioned to Division I are not eligible for the award if they served as head coach at that school before the start of the transition. Coaches who move to Division I from any coaching position with a professional team are not eligible, and interim head coaches are also ineligible.

== Winners ==
Awarded the Naismith College Coach of the Year the same season

Year	Coach	School	Record	Reference
2006–07	Krista Kilburn-Stevesky	Hofstra	26–8	
2007–08	Jeff Walz	Louisville	26–10	
2008–09	Kelly Packard	Ball State	26–9	
2009–10	Teresa Weatherspoon	Louisiana Tech	23–9	
2010–11	Stephanie Glance	Illinois State	24–10	
2011–12	Jennifer Hoover	High Point	20–13	
2012–13	Holly Warlick	Tennessee	27–8	
2013–14	Billi Godsey	Iona	26–6	
2014–15	Lisa Fortier	Gonzaga	26-8	
2015–16	Joni Taylor	Georgia	21–10	
2016–17	Shauna Green	Dayton	22–9	
2017–18	Bart Brooks	Belmont	31–4	
2018–19	Carlos Funchess	Southern	20–13	
2019–20	Amaka Agugua-Hamilton	Missouri State	26–4	
2020–21	Kyra Elzy	Kentucky	18–9	
2021–22	Kelly Rae Finley	Florida	21–11	
2022–23	Shawn Poppie	Chattanooga	20–13	
2023–24	Kim Caldwell	Marshall	26–7	
2024–25	Jan Jensen	Iowa	23–11	
2025–26	Katie Kuester	Army	26–8	

== Winners by school ==
School	Winners	Years
Army	1	2026
Ball State	1	2009
Belmont	1	2018
Chattanooga	1	2023
Dayton	1	2017
Florida	1	2022
Georgia	1	2016
Gonzaga	1	2015
High Point	1	2012
Hofstra	1	2007
Illinois State	1	2011
Iona	1	2014
Iowa	1	2025
Kentucky	1	2021
Louisiana Tech	1	2010
Louisville	1	2008
Marshall	1	2024
Missouri State	1	2020
Southern	1	2019
Tennessee	1	2013

== Gallery ==
Winners of the Maggie Dixon Award
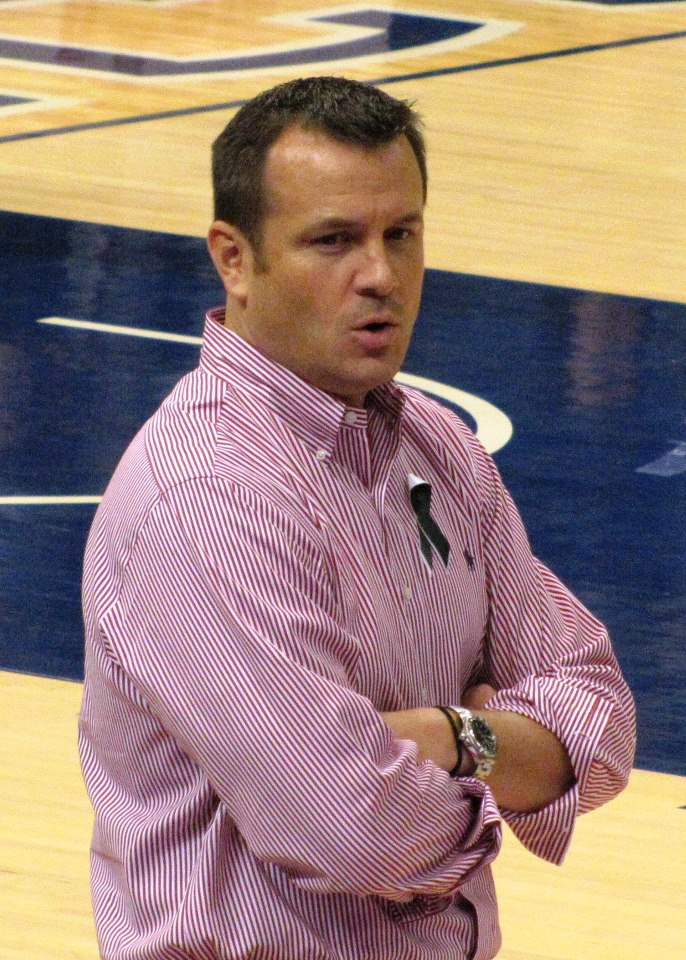
2008—Jeff Walz, Head Coach Louisville Cardinals

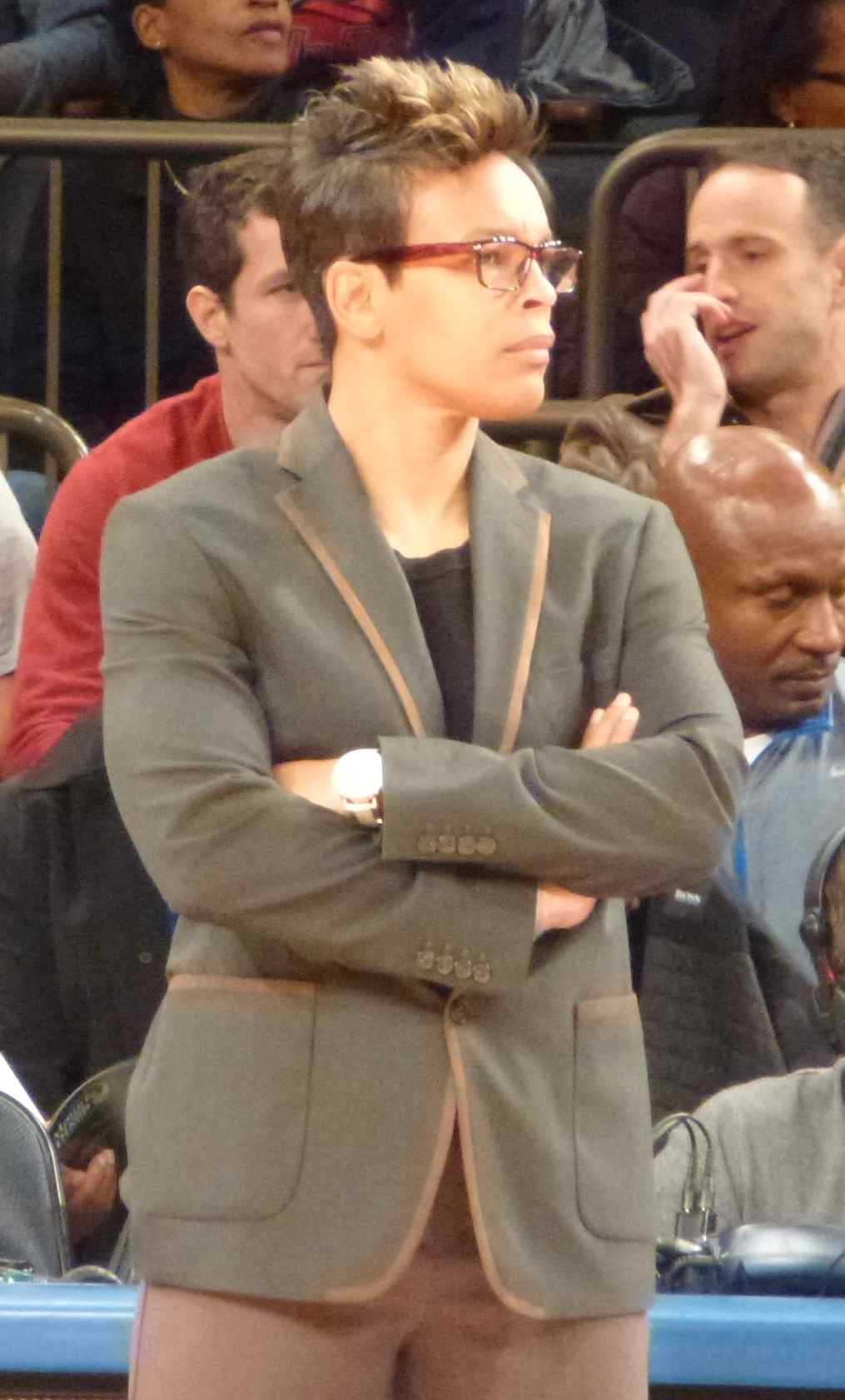
2010—Teresa Weatherspoon, Louisiana Tech women's basketball head coach

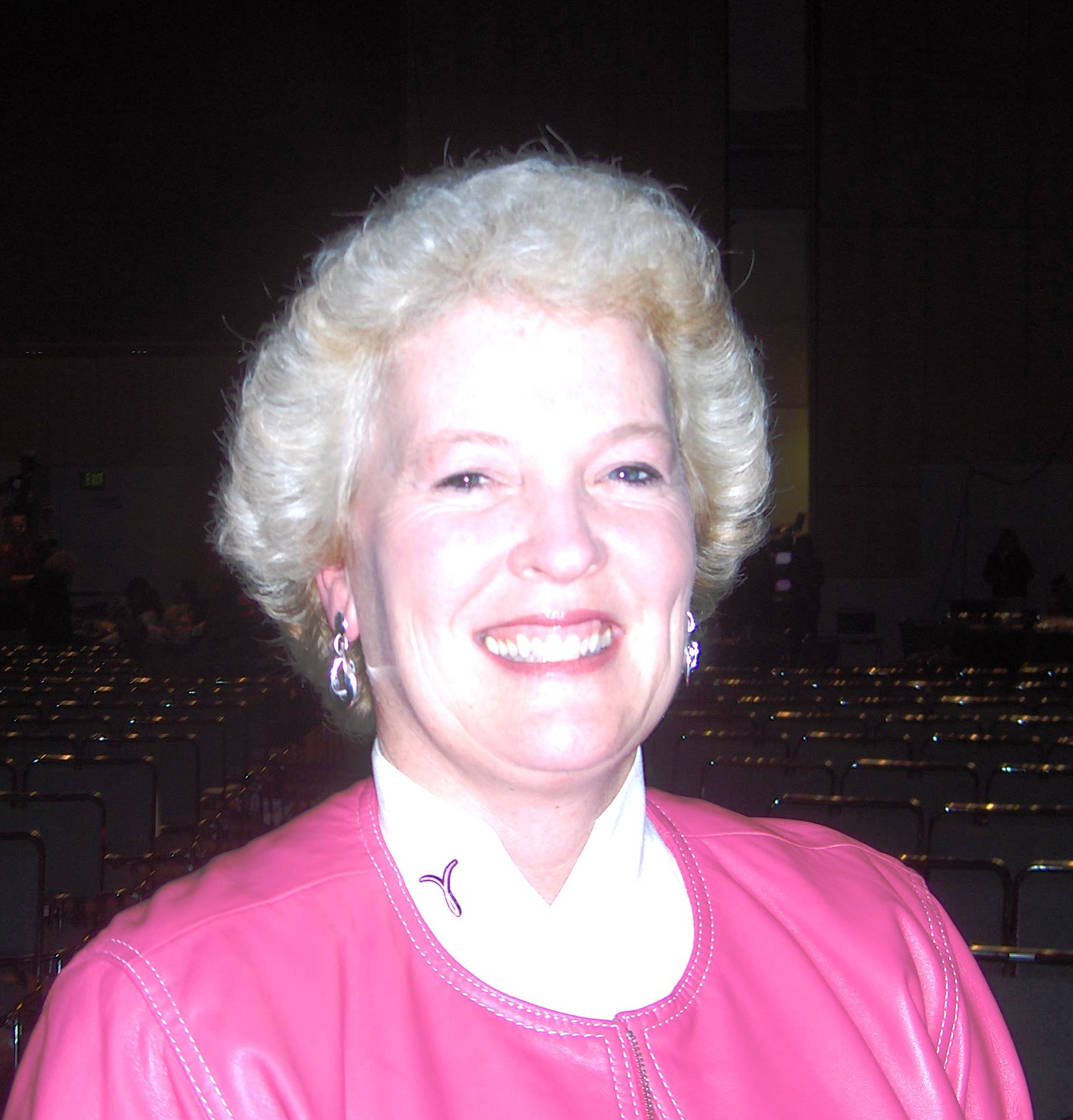
2011—Stephanie Glance, head women's basketball coach at Columbia University

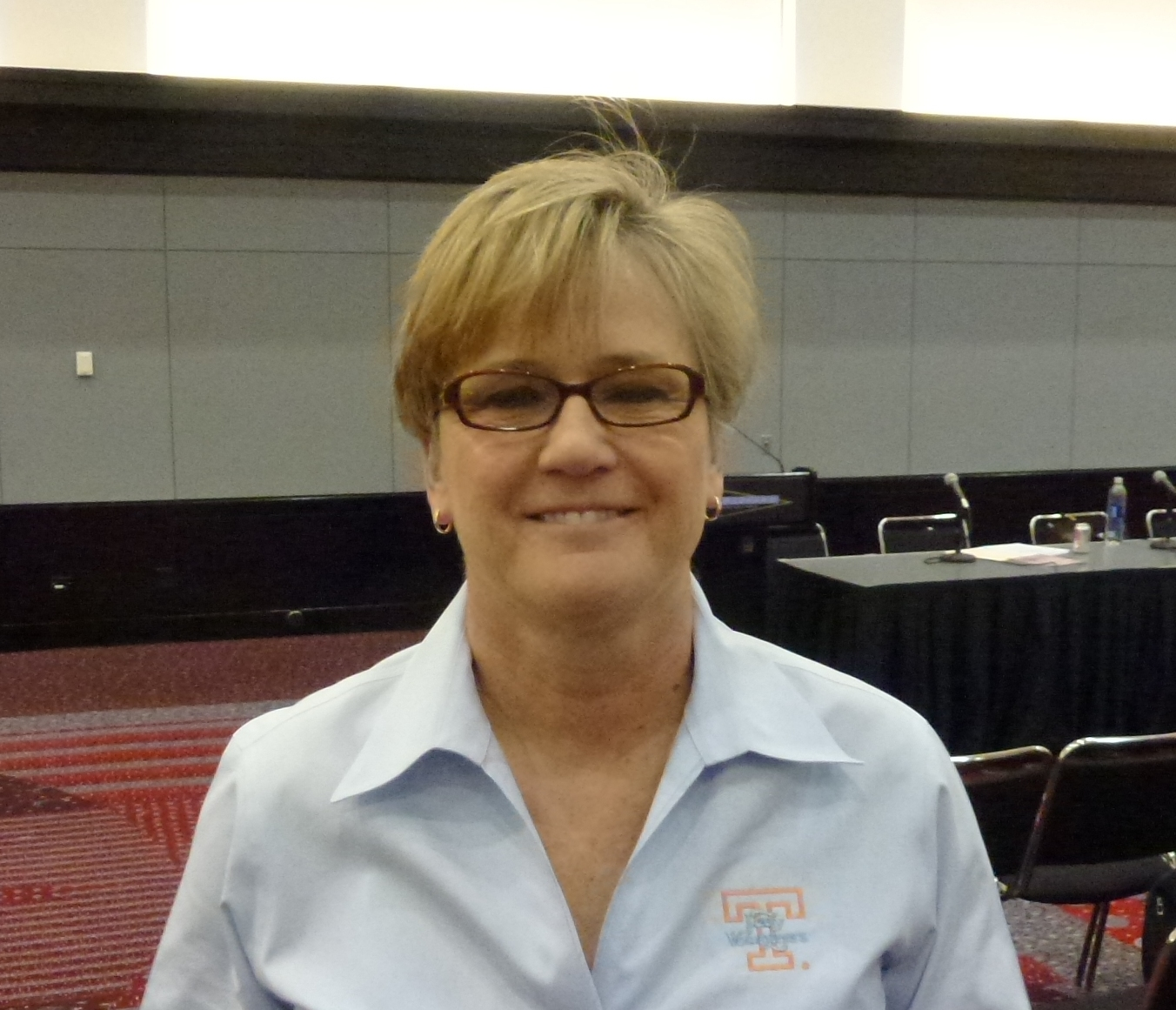
2013—Holly Warlick, Head Coach University of Tennessee

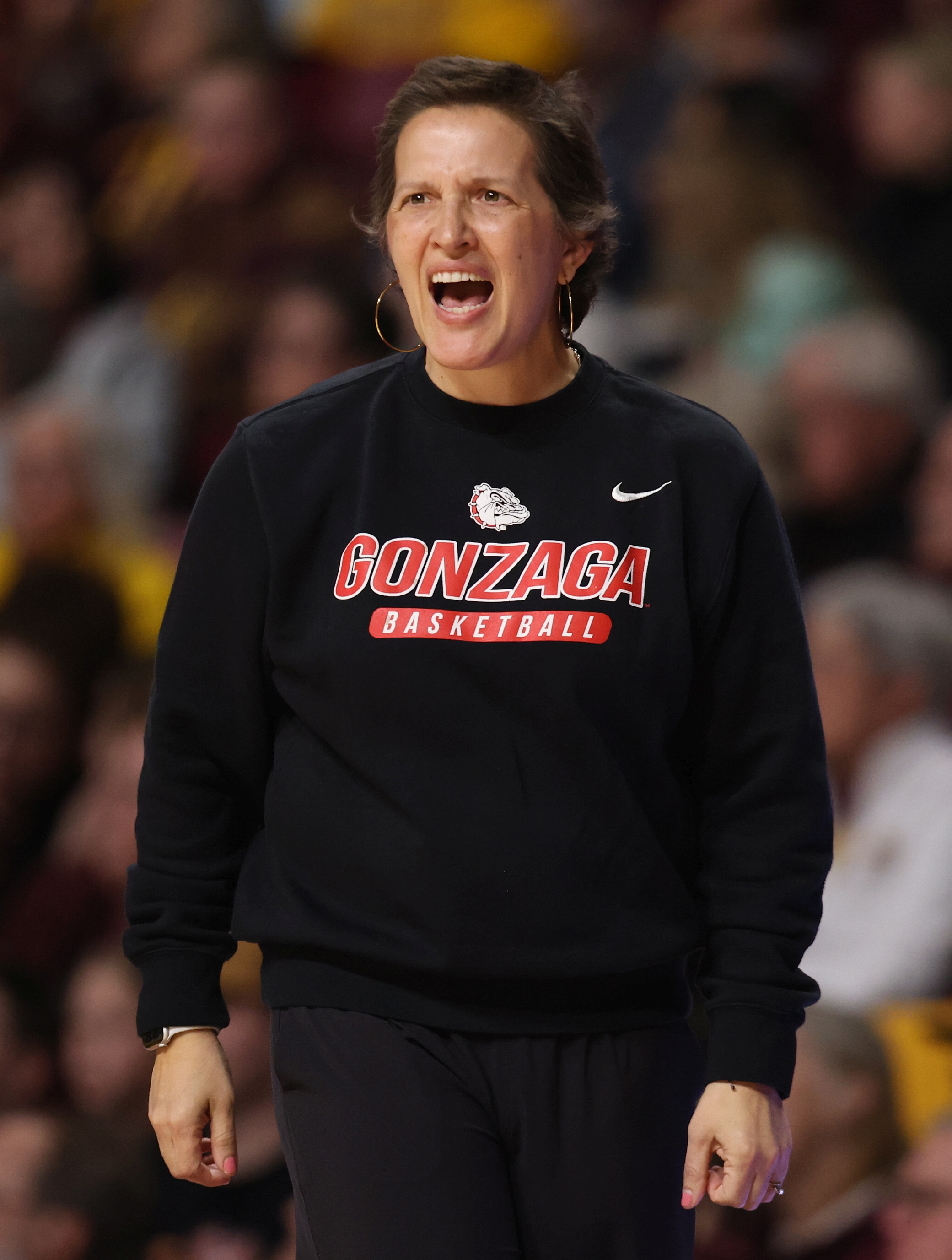
2015—Lisa Fortier, Head Coach Gonzaga University

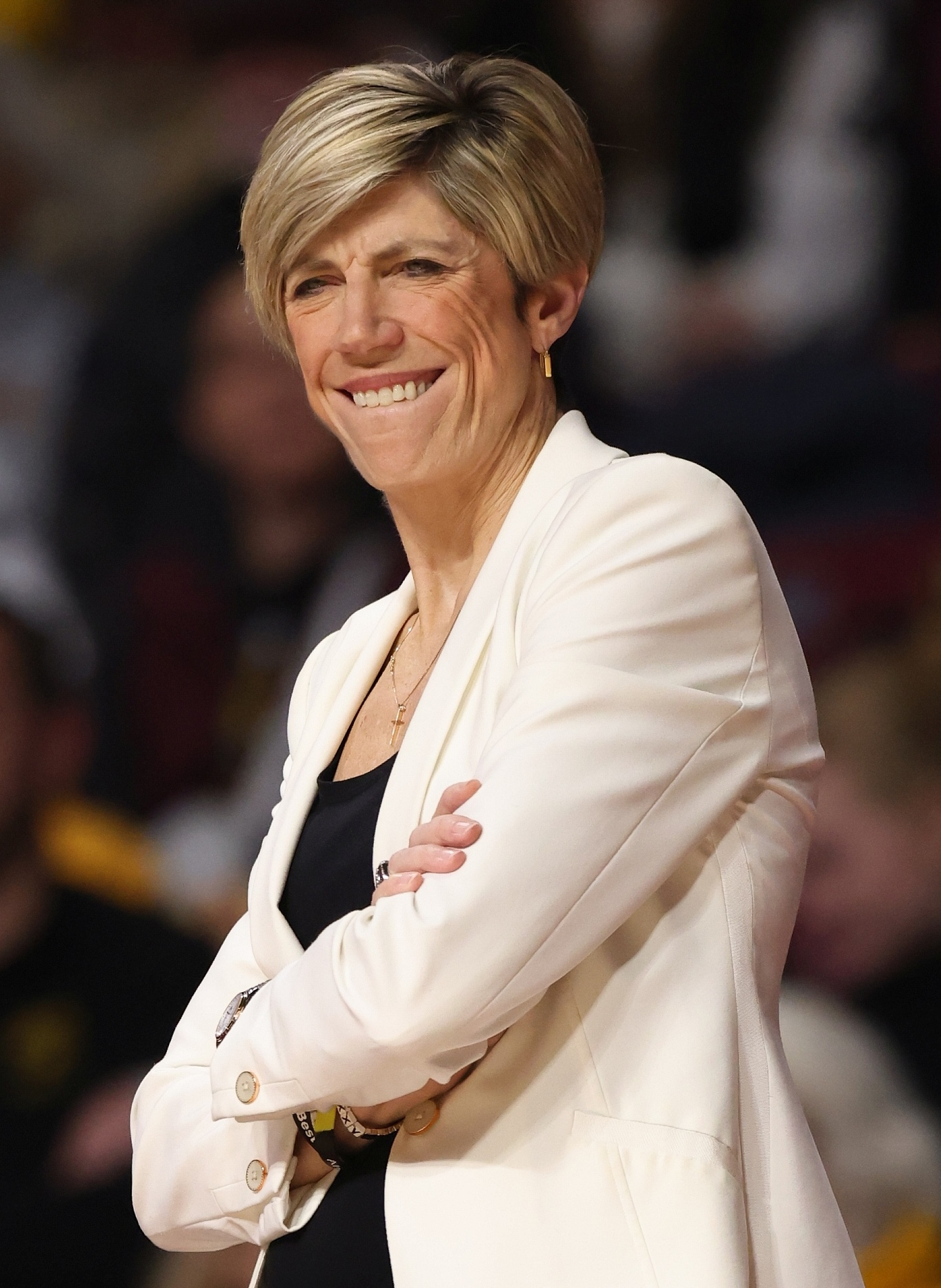
2025—Jan Jensen, Head Coach University of Iowa
