= Milwaukee Panthers basketball =

Milwaukee Panthers basketball may refer to either of the basketball teams that represent the University of Wisconsin–Milwaukee:

- Milwaukee Panthers men's basketball
- Milwaukee Panthers women's basketball
