= Army Black Knights basketball =

Army Black Knights basketball may refer to either of the basketball teams that represent the United States Military Academy:

- Army Black Knights men's basketball
- Army Black Knights women's basketball
