= 2026–27 American Eagles women's basketball team =

American college basketball season

2026–27 American Eagles women's basketball
- Conference: Patriot League
- Record: 0–3 (0–0 Patriot)
- Head coach: Kelly Killion (2nd season)
- Associate head coach: Robert Isme
- Assistant coaches: Paige Corkins; Niya Beverley
- Home arena: Bender Arena

2026–27 Patriot League women's basketball standings
	Conf.				Overall
Team	W		L	PCT	W		L	PCT
Army	0	–	0	–	4	–	0	1.000
Holy Cross	0	–	0	–	3	–	1	.750
Navy	0	–	0	–	2	–	2	.500
Loyola	0	–	0	–	2	–	3	.400
Colgate	0	–	0	–	1	–	2	.333
Boston University	0	–	0	–	1	–	3	.250
Bucknell	0	–	0	–	1	–	3	.250
Lafayette	0	–	0	–	1	–	3	.250
Lehigh	0	–	0	–	1	–	3	.250
American	0	–	0	–	0	–	3	.000
† 2027 Patriot League tournament winner As of November 16, 2026

The 2026–27 American Eagles women's basketball team currently represents American University during the 2026–27 NCAA Division I women's basketball season. The Eagles, led by second-year head coach Kelly Killion, play their home games at Bender Arena in Washington, D.C., and compete as a member of the Patriot League.

== Previous season ==
The Eagles finished the 2025–26 season 7–23 overall and 5–13 in Patriot League play, finishing ninth in the conference. As the No. 9 seed in the Patriot League tournament, they were defeated 58–69 by No. 6 seed Boston University to end their season.

== Offseason ==
=== Departures ===
American departures
Name	Num.	Pos.	Height	Year	Hometown	Reason for departure
Anna Rescifina	1	Guard	6'0"	Senior	Messina, Italy	Graduated
Laura Nogues	4	Guard	5'7"	Senior	Sabadell, Spain	Graduated
Charlotte Tuhy	21	Forward	6'1"	Freshman	Madison, NJ	Transferred to Stanford
Vienn Sheng	24	Guard	5'6"	Freshman	Palo Alto, CA	Left team (Note: Serving an 18-month mission for The Church of Jesus Christ of Latter Day Saints.)

=== Incoming transfers ===
American incoming transfers
Name	Num.	Pos.	Height	Year	Hometown	Previous school
Toni Smith	14	Guard	5'9"	Sophomore	Baldwin, NY	Delaware State
Jaymee Wadey	55	Forward	6'2"	Sophomore	Melbourne, Australia	Towson

=== Recruiting class ===
There was no 2026 recruiting class.

== Preseason ==
On October 1, 2026, the Patriot League released their annual preseason coaches poll. American was picked to finish last in the conference.

=== Preseason rankings ===
Patriot League Preseason Poll
Place	Team	Votes
1	Navy	81 (9)
2	Army	71
3	Lehigh	67 (1)
4	Holy Cross	53
5	Lafayette	52
6	Bucknell	37
7	Boston University	26
8	Colgate	22
9	Loyola Maryland	21
10	American	20
(#) first-place votes

=== Preseason All-Patriot League Team ===
No players were named to the Preseason All-Patriot League Team.

== Roster ==
2026–27 American Eagles women's basketball team
Players
Coaches

Pos.	#	Name	Height	Year	Previous school	Hometown
G	0	Kai Powell	5 ft 9 in (1.75 m)	Fr	Bishop McNamara High School	Upper Marlboro, MD
G	1	Andrea Jude	5 ft 9 in (1.75 m)	So	Rosemont Secondary School	Dublin, Ireland
F	2	Ellie Pingree	6 ft 2 in (1.88 m)	Jr	St. Paul's School	Bow, NH
G	3	Kayla Greyvensteyn	5 ft 9 in (1.75 m)	So	Grandview Prep	Parkland, FL
G	4	Jordyn Hollawell	5 ft 8 in (1.73 m)	Fr	Manasquan High School	Manasquan, NJ
G	5	Molly Driscoll	5 ft 8 in (1.73 m)	Jr	Allentown Central Catholic High School	Allentown, PA
G	9	Nina Višnjevac	5 ft 7 in (1.7 m)	Fr	Fort Erie International Academy	Toronto, Ontario
F	10	Grace Koepke	6 ft 4 in (1.93 m)	Sr	Vernon Hills High School	Vernon Hills, IL
G	11	Elizabeth Archer	6 ft 0 in (1.83 m)	Jr	Blair Academy	Chatham, NJ
G	12	Madisyn Moore-Nicholson	5 ft 7 in (1.7 m)	Jr	Georgetown Day School	Odenton, MD
G	14	Toni Smith	5 ft 9 in (1.75 m)	So	Baldwin High School; Delaware State	Baldwin, NY
G	20	Mary Bolesky	5 ft 4 in (1.63 m)	Jr	Lancaster Catholic High School	Elizabethtown, PA
F	22	Lauren Wright	6 ft 1 in (1.85 m)	Fr	Loomis Chaffee School	West Hartford, CT
G	24	Ella Gottlieb	5 ft 7 in (1.7 m)	Fr	IMG Academy	Boca Raton, FL
G	30	Lexi Salazar	5 ft 7 in (1.7 m)	Sr	Plainfield North High School	Plainfield, IL
F	55	Jaymee Wadey	6 ft 2 in (1.88 m)	So	Rowville Sports Academy; Towson	Melbourne, Australia

Head coach

- Kelly Killion (Holy Family)

Assistant coach(es)

- Robert Isme (NJIT)
- Paige Corkins (Concordia College)
- Niya Beverley (Penn State)

Legend

- (C) Team captain
- (S) Suspended
- (I) Ineligible
- (W) Walk-on
- Injured
- Current redshirt

Roster
Last update: November 7, 2026

== Schedule and results ==
Date time, TV	Rank^{#}	Opponent^{#}	Result	Record	High points	High rebounds	High assists	Site (attendance) city, state
Non-conference regular season
November 5, 2026*; 7:00 p.m., ESPN+		at Georgetown	L 65–75	0–1	23 – Driscoll	8 – Koepke	4 – Tied	McDonough Arena (502); Washington, D.C.
November 13, 2026*; 11:00 a.m., MEAC Network		at Delaware State	L 63–72	0–2	13 – Smith	4 – Tied	3 – Salazar	Memorial Hall (20); Dover, DE
November 15, 2026*; 4:00 p.m., ESPN+		at Delaware	L 61–83	0–3	14 – Driscoll	12 – Archer	4 – Višnjevac	Bob Carpenter Center (1,626); Newark, DE
November 18, 2026*; 6:00 p.m., ESPN+		Drexel						Bender Arena; Washington, D.C.
November 21, 2026*; 2:00 p.m., ESPN+		La Salle						Bender Arena; Washington, D.C.
November 24, 2026*; 11:00 a.m., ESPN+		at Yale						John J. Lee Amphitheater; New Haven, CT
November 30, 2026*; 6:00 p.m., ESPN+		Washington Adventist						Bender Arena; Washington, D.C.
December 3, 2026*; 7:00 p.m., FloCollege		at William & Mary						Kaplan Arena; Williamsburg, VA
December 6, 2026*; 1:00 p.m., ESPN+		LIU						Bender Arena; Washington, D.C.
December 9, 2026*; 7:00 p.m., ACCNX		at Virginia						John Paul Jones Arena; Charlottesville, VA
December 21, 2026*; 12:00 p.m., ESPN+		at UMBC						Chesapeake Employers Insurance Arena; Baltimore, MD
Patriot League regular season
December 30, 2026; 2:00 p.m., ESPN+		at Lehigh						Stabler Arena; Bethlehem, PA
January 2, 2027; 2:00 p.m., ESPN+		at Holy Cross						Hart Center Arena; Worcester, MA
January 6, 2027; 6:00 p.m., ESPN+		Colgate						Bender Arena; Washington, D.C.
January 9, 2027; 1:00 p.m., ESPN+		at Lafayette						Kirby Sports Center; Easton, PA
January 13, 2027; 6:00 p.m., ESPN+		Loyola Maryland						Bender Arena; Washington, D.C.
January 16, 2027; 1:00 p.m., ESPN+		Boston University						Bender Arena; Washington, D.C.
January 20, 2027; 6:00 p.m., CBSSN		at Navy						Alumni Hall; Annapolis, MD
January 23, 2027; 1:00 p.m., ESPN+		Lafayette						Bender Arena; Washington, D.C.
January 27, 2027; 6:00 p.m., ESPN+		at Bucknell						Sojka Pavilion; Lewisburg, PA
January 30, 2027; 2:00 p.m., ESPN+		at Boston University						Case Gym; Boston, MA
February 3, 2027; 6:00 p.m., ESPN+		Army						Bender Arena; Washington, D.C.
February 6, 2027; 1:00 p.m., CBSSN		at Loyola Maryland						Reitz Arena; Baltimore, MD
February 8, 2027; 4:30 p.m., CBSSN		Lehigh						Bender Arena; Washington, D.C.
February 13, 2027; 6:00 p.m., ESPN+		Navy						Bender Arena; Washington, D.C.
February 17, 2027; 6:00 p.m., ESPN+		Army						Christl Arena; West Point, NY
February 20, 2027; 2:00 p.m., ESPN+		at Colgate						Cotterell Court; Hamilton, NY
February 23, 2027; 6:00 p.m., ESPN+		Bucknell						Bender Arena; Washington, D.C.
February 26, 2027; 5:00 p.m., ESPN+		Holy Cross						Bender Arena; Washington, D.C.
Patriot League tournament
March 1–9, 2027; TBA								TBD; TBD
*Non-conference game. ^{#}Rankings from AP Poll. (#) Tournament seedings in parentheses. All times are in Eastern.
