= 2026–27 Boston University Terriers women's basketball team =

American college basketball season

2026–27 Boston University Terriers women's basketball
- Conference: Patriot League
- Record: 2–3 (0–0 Patriot)
- Head coach: Melissa Graves (6th season)
- Assistant coaches: Katie Nelson; Moneshia Davis; Clint Williams
- Home arena: Case Gym

2026–27 Patriot League women's basketball standings
	Conf.				Overall
Team	W		L	PCT	W		L	PCT
Army	0	–	0	–	5	–	1	.833
Navy	0	–	0	–	4	–	2	.667
Holy Cross	0	–	0	–	3	–	2	.600
Boston University	0	–	0	–	2	–	3	.400
Colgate	0	–	0	–	2	–	3	.400
Lehigh	0	–	0	–	2	–	3	.400
Loyola	0	–	0	–	2	–	3	.400
Bucknell	0	–	0	–	1	–	4	.200
Lafayette	0	–	0	–	1	–	4	.200
American	0	–	0	–	0	–	4	.000
† 2027 Patriot League tournament winner As of November 21, 2026

The 2026–27 Boston University Terriers women's basketball team currently represents Boston University during the 2026–27 NCAA Division I women's basketball season. The Terriers, led by sixth-year head coach Melissa Graves, play their home games at Case Gym in Boston, Massachusetts and compete as a member of the Patriot League.

== Previous season ==
The Terriers finished the 2025–26 season 11–20 overall and 6–12 in Patriot League play, finishing eighth in the conference. As the No. 8 seed in the Patriot League tournament, they defeated No. 6 seed American 69–58 in the first round before losing to top-seeded Navy 66–76 in the quarterfinals to end their season.

== Offseason ==
=== Departures ===
Boston University departures
Name	Num.	Pos.	Height	Year	Hometown	Reason for departure
Brooke Baisley	11	Guard	5'10"	Sophomore	Flanders, NJ	Transferred to NYU (D-III)
Anete Adler	20	Forward	6'5"	Senior	Keila, Estonia	Transferred to Colorado
Audrey Ericksen	21	Guard	6'0"	Junior	Cary, NC	Transferred to NC State
Anastasiia Semenova	31	Forward	6'2"	Senior	Saint Petersburg, Russia	Transferred to Arizona
Sisi Bentley	94	Forward	6'0"	Junior	Hartford, CT	Transferred to IUP (D-II)

=== Incoming transfers ===
Boston University incoming transfers
Name	Num.	Pos.	Height	Year	Hometown	Previous school
Yael Maayan	32	Forward	6'1"	Junior	Even Yehuda, Israel	Samford

=== Recruiting class ===
There was no 2026 recruiting class.

== Preseason ==
On October 1, 2026, the Patriot League released their annual preseason coaches poll. Boston University was picked to finish seventh in the conference.

=== Preseason rankings ===
Patriot League Preseason Poll
Place	Team	Votes
1	Navy	81 (9)
2	Army	71
3	Lehigh	67 (1)
4	Holy Cross	53
5	Lafayette	52
6	Bucknell	37
7	Boston University	26
8	Colgate	22
9	Loyola Maryland	21
10	American	20
(#) first-place votes

=== Preseason All-Patriot League Team ===
No players were named to the Preseason All-Patriot League Team.

== Roster ==
2026–27 Boston University Terriers women's basketball team
Players
Coaches

Pos.	#	Name	Height	Year	Previous school	Hometown
G	1	Taylor Williams	5 ft 8 in (1.73 m)	Jr	Crestwood Prep	Ajax, Ontario
F	3	Grace Lee	6 ft 2 in (1.88 m)	Fr	DePaul College Prep	Chicago, IL
G	5	Aoibhe Gormley	5 ft 8 in (1.73 m)	Sr	Thayer Academy	Quincy, MA
G	8	Aina Grane Torres	6 ft 0 in (1.83 m)	Sr	Bernat el Ferrer	Molins de Rei, Spain
G	10	Rose Azmoudeh	5 ft 9 in (1.75 m)	Jr	Half Hollow Hills East High School; Austin Peay	Dix Hills, NY
G	12	Bella McLaughlin	5 ft 8 in (1.73 m)	Sr	Hampden Academy; Providence	Hampden, ME
G	14	Inés Monteagudo Pardo	5 ft 11 in (1.8 m)	Sr	Martí Sorolla II School	Valencia, Spain
F	15	Addison Dorfman	6 ft 0 in (1.83 m)	Fr	Mamaroneck High School	Larchmont, NY
G	18	Hildur Gunnsteinsdóttir	5 ft 10 in (1.78 m)	Jr	Hamar Basketball Club	Selfoss, Iceland
G	21	Sophia Georgiades	5 ft 7 in (1.7 m)	Fr	Rutgers Prep	Somerset, NJ
F	22	Kate Allard	6 ft 2 in (1.88 m)	So	New Bedford High School	Bedford, NH
G	23	Brielle Alaba	5 ft 10 in (1.78 m)	Fr	Cherokee High School	Marlton, NJ
F	32	Yael Maayan	6 ft 1 in (1.85 m)	Jr	Wingate Academy of Sports Excellence; Samford	Even Yehuda, Israel
F	42	Allison Schwertner	6 ft 3 in (1.91 m)	Jr	Mullen High School	Littleton, CO

Head coach

- Melissa Graves (Notre Dame)

Assistant coach(es)

- Katie Nelson (Boston University)
- Moneshia Davis (Morgan State)
- Clint Williams (Arkansas Baptist)

Legend

- (C) Team captain
- (S) Suspended
- (I) Ineligible
- (W) Walk-on
- Injured
- Current redshirt

Roster
Last update: November 5, 2026

== Schedule and results ==
Date time, TV	Rank^{#}	Opponent^{#}	Result	Record	High points	High rebounds	High assists	Site (attendance) city, state
Non-conference regular season
November 2, 2026*; 6:30 p.m., ESPN+		at Dartmouth	L 49–56	0–1	11 – Allard	8 – Grane Torres	6 – Gormley	Leede Arena (824); Hanover, NH
November 6, 2026*; 6:00 p.m., ESPN+		Northeastern	L 61–71	0–2	16 – Allard	5 – Tied	4 – Allard	Case Gym; Boston, MA
November 10, 2026*; 6:00 p.m., ESPN+		UMass Boston	W 88–47	1–2	30 – Georgiades	7 – Grane Torres	5 – Allard	Case Gym (377); Boston, MA
November 14, 2026*; 2:00 p.m., ESPN+		at Quinnipiac	L 47–58	1–3	23 – Georgiades	7 – Allard	3 – Gormley	M&T Bank Center (377); Hamden, CT
November 18, 2026*; 5:00 p.m., NESN+		at Stonehill	W 57–54	2–3	15 – Georgiades	5 – Tied	4 – Gormley	Merkert Gymnasium (109); Easton, MA
November 22, 2026*; 2:00 p.m., ESPN+		New Hampshire						Case Gym; Boston, MA
November 25, 2026*; 12:00 p.m., ESPN+		Brown						Case Gym; Boston, MA
November 29, 2026*; 1:00 p.m., ESPN+		at Bryant						Chace Athletic Center; Smithfield, RI
December 2, 2026*; 6:00 p.m., ESPN+		at UMass Lowell						Kennedy Family Athletic Complex; Lowell, MA
December 5, 2026*; 1:00 p.m., ESPN+		UNLV						Case Gym; Boston, MA
December 9, 2026*; 6:00 p.m., ESPN+		New Haven						Case Gym; Boston, MA
December 12, 2026*; 12:00 p.m., ESPN+		Marist						Case Gym; Boston, MA
December 19, 2026*; 1:00 p.m., ESPN+		Vermont						Case Gym; Boston, MA
Patriot League regular season
December 30, 2026; 6:00 p.m., ESPN+		Loyola Maryland						Case Gym; Boston, MA
January 2, 2027; 6:00 p.m., ESPN+		Lehigh						Case Gym; Boston, MA
January 6, 2027; 6:00 p.m., ESPN+		at Bucknell						Sojka Pavilion; Lewisburg, PA
January 9, 2027; 1:00 p.m., CBSSN		at Navy						Alumni Hall; Annapolis, MD
January 13, 2027; 11:30 a.m., ESPN+		Lafayette						Case Gym; Boston, MA
January 16, 2027; 1:00 p.m., ESPN+		at American						Bender Arena; Washington, D.C.
January 20, 2027; 6:00 p.m., ESPN+		Colgate						Case Gym; Boston, MA
January 23, 2027; 2:00 p.m., ESPN+		Holy Cross						Case Gym; Boston, MA
January 27, 2027; 1:00 p.m., ESPN+		at Lafayette						Kirby Sports Center; Easton, PA
January 30, 2027; 2:00 p.m., ESPN+		American						Case Gym; Boston, MA
February 3, 2027; 6:00 p.m., ESPN+		at Lehigh						Stabler Arena; Bethlehem, PA
February 6, 2027; 2:00 p.m., ESPN+		American						Case Gym; Boston, MA
February 10, 2027; 6:00 p.m., ESPN+		at Colgate						Cotterell Court; Hamilton, NY
February 14, 2027; TBA, ESPN+		at Loyola Maryland						Reitz Arena; Baltimore, MD
February 17, 2027; 6:00 p.m., ESPN+		Bucknell						Case Gym; Boston, MA
February 20, 2027; 2:00 p.m., ESPN+		at Holy Cross						Hart Center Arena; Worcester, MA
February 23, 2027; 6:00 p.m., ESPN+		Navy						Case Gym; Boston, MA
February 26, 2027; 6:00 p.m., ESPN+		at Army						Christl Arena; West Point, NY
Patriot League tournament
March 1–9, 2027; TBA								
*Non-conference game. ^{#}Rankings from AP Poll. (#) Tournament seedings in parentheses. All times are in Eastern.
