= 2026–27 Bucknell Bison women's basketball team =

American college basketball season

2026–27 Bucknell Bison women's basketball
- Conference: Patriot League
- Record: 1–4 (0–0 Patriot)
- Head coach: Trevor Woodruff (8th season)
- Associate head coach: Lauren Holden
- Assistant coaches: Edward Joyner Jr.; Danielle Patterson; Erin Jones
- Home arena: Sojka Pavilion

2026–27 Patriot League women's basketball standings
	Conf.				Overall
Team	W		L	PCT	W		L	PCT
Army	0	–	0	–	5	–	1	.833
Navy	0	–	0	–	4	–	2	.667
Holy Cross	0	–	0	–	3	–	2	.600
Boston University	0	–	0	–	2	–	3	.400
Colgate	0	–	0	–	2	–	3	.400
Lehigh	0	–	0	–	2	–	3	.400
Loyola	0	–	0	–	2	–	3	.400
Bucknell	0	–	0	–	1	–	4	.200
Lafayette	0	–	0	–	1	–	4	.200
American	0	–	0	–	0	–	4	.000
† 2027 Patriot League tournament winner As of November 22, 2026

The 2026–27 Bucknell Bison women's basketball team currently represents Bucknell University during the 2026–27 NCAA Division I women's basketball season. The Bison, led by sixth-year head coach Trevor Woodruff, play their home games at Sojka Pavilion in Lewisburg, Pennsylvania and compete as a member of the Patriot League.

== Previous season ==
The Bison finished the 2025–26 season 11–19 overall and 7–11 in Patriot League play, finishing in a tie for sixth in the conference with Lafayette. As the No. 7 seed in the Patriot League tournament, they lost 47–57 to No. 10 seed Colgate to end their season.

== Offseason ==
=== Departures ===
Bucknell departures
Name	Num.	Pos.	Height	Year	Hometown	Reason for departure
Elena Haughton	0	Forward	Senior	6'1"	Washington, D.C.	Graduated
Desirae Ashton	4	Forward	6'0"	Sophomore	Fredericksburg, VA	Transferred to George Mason
Grace Backus	7	Guard	5'7"	Freshman	Ithaca, NY	Left team
Hope Masonius	13	Guard	5'9"	Sophomore	Spring Lake, NJ	Transferred to Rutgers
Tuana Coskun	23	Forward	6'0"	Junior	Istanbul, Turkey	Transferred to East Carolina

=== Incoming transfers ===
Bucknell incoming transfers
Name	Num.	Pos.	Height	Year	Hometown	Previous school
Peyton Musial	10	Guard	5'10"	Sophomore	De Pere, WI	UAB

=== Recruiting class ===
There was no 2026 recruiting class.

== Preseason ==
On October 1, 2026, the Patriot League released their annual preseason coaches poll. Bucknell was picked to finish sixth in the conference.

=== Preseason rankings ===
Patriot League Preseason Poll
Place	Team	Votes
1	Navy	81 (9)
2	Army	71
3	Lehigh	67 (1)
4	Holy Cross	53
5	Lafayette	52
6	Bucknell	37
7	Boston University	26
8	Colgate	22
9	Loyola Maryland	21
10	American	20
(#) first-place votes

=== Preseason All-Patriot League Team ===
No players were named to the Preseason All-Patriot League Team.

== Roster ==
Years are listed according to the new NCAA age-based eligibility model.

2026–27 Bucknell Bison women's basketball team
Players
Coaches

Pos.	#	Name	Height	Year	Previous school	Hometown
G	0	Tessa Liggio	5 ft 7 in (1.7 m)	Fr	Red Bank Catholic High School	Colts Neck, NJ
G	1	Kaila Richards	5 ft 6 in (1.68 m)	So	Hotchkiss School	Far Rockaway, NY
G	2	Isabella Casey	5 ft 10 in (1.78 m)	Jr	Germantown Academy	Radnor, PA
G	4	Grace Feeney	6 ft 0 in (1.83 m)	Fr	Trinity Hall	Leonardo, NJ
G	10	Peyton Musial	5 ft 10 in (1.78 m)	So	Notre Dame Academy; UAB	De Pere, WI
F	11	Mariah Hardy	6 ft 1 in (1.85 m)	So	St. Timothy's School	Baltimore, MD
F	12	Alaina Dadzie	6 ft 1 in (1.85 m)	Fr	Loyalsock Township High School	Williamsport, PA
F	14	Marisa Smith	6 ft 3 in (1.91 m)	Jr	Johnson City High School	Johnson City, NY
G/F	20	Reese Zemitis	6 ft 0 in (1.83 m)	Jr	Neshaminy High School	Langhorne, PA
G	21	Anna Kunzwiler	5 ft 9 in (1.75 m)	Sr	Paul VI Catholic High School; Stetson	Leesburg, VA
G	22	Ella Kreuzer	5 ft 10 in (1.78 m)	So	Chatham High School	Chatham, NJ
G/F	33	Elana Weisman	6 ft 2 in (1.88 m)	Jr	Archbishop Mitty High School	Burlingame, CA

Head coach

- Trevor Woodruff (Misericordia)

Assistant coach(es)

- Lauren Holden (Georgia)
- Edward Joyner Jr. (Fordham)
- Danielle Patterson (St. John's)
- Erin Jones (Rhode Island)

Legend

- (C) Team captain
- (S) Suspended
- (I) Ineligible
- (W) Walk-on
- Injured
- Current redshirt

Roster
Last update: November 18, 2026

== Schedule and results ==
Date time, TV	Rank^{#}	Opponent^{#}	Result	Record	High points	High rebounds	High assists	Site (attendance) city, state
Non-conference regular season
November 2, 2026*; 6:00 p.m., SECN+		at Florida	L 60–81	0–1	11 – Allard	8 – Grane Torres	6 – Gormley	O'Connell Center (824); Gainesville, FL
November 7, 2026*; 3:00 p.m., ESPN+		at Brown	L 61–73	0–2	12 – Tied	6 – Zemitis	5 – Liggio	Pizzitola Sports Center (387); Providence, RI
November 11, 2026*; 6:00 p.m., ESPN+		Fordham	L 71–78	0–3	20 – Zemitis	6 – Weisman	6 – Weisman	Sojka Pavilion (346); Lewisburg, PA
November 14, 2026*; 2:00 p.m., ESPN+		at Mount St. Mary's	W 73–48	1–3	22 – Liggio	8 – Weisman	7 – Liggio	Knott Arena (926); Emmitsburg, MD
November 18, 2026*; 11:00 a.m., ESPN+		at Albany	L 59–65	1–4	16 – Casey	5 – Tied	4 – Kunzwiler	Broadview Center (2,112); Albany, NY
November 21, 2026*; 5:00 p.m., ESPN+		Iona	L 50–57	1–5	11 – Liggio	9 – Casey	{{{assists}}} – Tied	Sojka Pavilion (247); Lewisburg, PA
November 24, 2026*; 11:00 a.m., ESPN+		at Le Moyne						Ted Grant Court; Syracuse, NY
November 27, 2026*; 1:00 p.m., ESPN+		Delaware State						Sojka Pavilion; Lewisburg, PA
November 29, 2026*; 3:00 p.m., ESPN+		at DePaul						Wintrust Arena; Chicago, IL
December 5, 2026*; 2:00 p.m., ESPN+		at James Madison						Atlantic Union Bank Center; Harrisonburg, VA
December 8, 2026*; 11:00 a.m., ESPN+		Susquehanna						Sojka Pavilion; Lewisburg, PA
December 18, 2026*; 10:00 a.m., ACCNX		at Syracuse						JMA Wireless Dome; Syracuse, NY
December 21, 2026*; 2:00 p.m., ESPN+		Delaware						Sojka Pavilion; Lewisburg, PA
Patriot League regular season
December 30, 2026; 6:00 p.m., ESPN+		at Colgate						Cotterell Court; Hamilton, NY
January 2, 2027; 2:00 p.m., ESPN+		Navy						Sojka Pavilion; Lewisburg, PA
January 6, 2027; 6:00 p.m., ESPN+		Boston University						Sojka Pavilion; Lewisburg, PA
January 9, 2027; 2:00 p.m., ESPN+		at Lehigh						Stabler Arena; Bethlehem, PA
January 13, 2027; 6:00 p.m., ESPN+		Army						Sojka Pavilion; Lewisburg, PA
January 16, 2027; 2:00 p.m., ESPN+		at Loyola Maryland						Reitz Arena; Baltimore, MD
January 20, 2027; 6:00 p.m., ESPN+		at Holy Cross						Hart Center Arena; Worcester, MA
January 23, 2027; 2:00 p.m., ESPN+		Colgate						Sojka Pavilion; Lewisburg, PA
January 27, 2027; 6:00 p.m., ESPN+		American						Sojka Pavilion; Lewisburg, PA
January 30, 2027; 2:00 p.m., ESPN+		at Army						Christl Arena; West Point, NY
February 3, 2027; 6:00 p.m., CBSSN		at Navy						Alumni Hall; Annapolis, MD
February 6, 2027; 2:00 p.m., ESPN+		Lehigh						Sojka Pavilion; Lewisburg, PA
February 10, 2027; 6:00 p.m., ESPN+		Holy Cross						Sojka Pavilion; Lewisburg, PA
February 13, 2027; 2:00 p.m., ESPN+		at Lafayette						Kirby Sports Center; Easton, PA
February 17, 2027; 6:00 p.m., ESPN+		at Boston University						Case Gym; Boston, MA
February 20, 2027; 2:00 p.m., ESPN+		Loyola Maryland						Sojka Pavilion; Lewisburg, PA
February 23, 2027; 6:00 p.m., ESPN+		at American						Bender Arena; Washington, D.C.
February 26, 2027; 6:00 p.m., ESPN+		Lafayette						Sojka Pavilion; Lewisburg, PA
Patriot League tournament
March 1–9, 2027; TBA								
*Non-conference game. ^{#}Rankings from AP Poll. (#) Tournament seedings in parentheses. All times are in Eastern.
