= Kyle Rechlicz =

American basketball coach

Current position
- Title: Head coach
- Team: Milwaukee
- Conference: Horizon League
- Record: 197–237 (.454)

Biographical details
- Born: March 4, 1980 (age 46); Indianapolis, Indiana, U.S.

Playing career
- 1998–2002: Wisconsin

Coaching career (HC unless noted)
- 2002–2003: Wisconsin (student assistant)
- 2003–2007: Cleveland State (assistant)
- 2007–2011: Dayton (associate HC)
- 2011–2012: Wisconsin (assistant)
- 2012–present: Milwaukee

Head coaching record
- Overall: 197–237
- Tournaments: 2–3 (WNIT); 2–1 (WBI)

Accomplishments and honors

Championships
- 1 Horizon League Regular Season (2021)

Awards
- Horizon League Coach of the Year (2016)

Kyle Rechlicz (née Black; born March 4, 1980) is the head coach of the NCAA Division I Milwaukee Panthers women's basketball team, which competes in the Horizon League.

== Career ==
Through her 14 years as a head coach, Rechlicz has compiled a 197-237 record, including a 124-136 mark in conference play.

In her tenure, Rechlicz, the 2016 Horizon League Coach of the Year, has returned Milwaukee to a place of prominence with three 20-win campaigns, the most in the program's Division I history.

As Kyle Black, she attended the University of Wisconsin-Madison, where she helped guide Wisconsin to four post-season tournament appearances, including the 2000–01 and 2001–02 teams that went to the NCAA tournament. She led the Big Ten Conference in three-point field goal percentage as a junior, hitting 40.6 percent from beyond the arc. She earned her Bachelor of Business Administration degree in 2003.

== Wisconsin statistics ==
- Sports-Reference

Legend
GP	Games played	GS	Games started	MPG	Minutes per game
FG%	Field goal percentage	3P%	3-point field goal percentage	FT%	Free throw percentage
RPG	Rebounds per game	APG	Assists per game	SPG	Steals per game
BPG	Blocks per game	PPG	Points per game	**Bold**	Career high

Year	Team	GP	Points	FG%	3P%	FT%	RPG	APG	SPG	BPG	PPG
1998–99	Wisconsin	**32**	196	39.2%	35.0%	75.0%	**2.2**	1.6	0.5	0.03	6.1
1999–00	Wisconsin	**32**	156	42.0%	28.4%	73.9%	2.0	0.9	0.6	0.3	4.9
2000–01	Wisconsin	28	254	**43.5%**	**40.6%**	73.9%	1.8	**2.2**	**1.1**	**0.7**	9.1
2001–02	Wisconsin	31	**370**	43.2%	37.9%	**85.1%**	**2.2**	**2.2**	**1.1**	0.1	**11.9**
Career		123	976	42.2%	36.5%	77.6%	2.0	1.7	0.8	0.05	7.9

== Head coaching record ==
- Milwaukee
- Horizon

Record table
Season	Team	Overall	Conference	Standing	Postseason
**Milwaukee Panthers** (Horizon League) (2012–present)
2012–13	Milwaukee	9–20	5–11	t–6th	
2013–14	Milwaukee	8–22	4–12	7th	
2014–15	Milwaukee	10–20	5–11	8th	
2015–16	Milwaukee	19–13	12–6	t–2nd	WNIT First round
2016–17	Milwaukee	22–12	11–7	5th	WBI Semifinals
2017–18	Milwaukee	21–12	11–7	3rd	WNIT Second round
2018–19	Milwaukee	15–15	10–8	6th	
2019–20	Milwaukee	15–16	11–7	5th	
2020–21	Milwaukee	20–8	15–5	t–1st	WNIT Second round
2021–22	Milwaukee	15–16	13–9	6th	
2022–23	Milwaukee	11–19	8–12	t–7th	
2023–24	Milwaukee	16–16	10–10	5th	
2024–25	Milwaukee	8–24	5–15	11th	
2025–26	Milwaukee	8–24	4–16	t-10th	
Milwaukee:		197–237 (.454)	124–136 (.477)		
Total:		197–237 (.454)			
National champion Postseason invitational champion Conference regular season champion Conference regular season and conference tournament champion Division regular season champion Division regular season and conference tournament champion Conference tournament champion
