= Central Arkansas Sugar Bears basketball =

| 2025–26 Central Arkansas Sugar Bears basketball team |
- University: University of Central Arkansas
- Head coach: Tony Kemper (3rd season)
- Location: Conway, Arkansas
- Arena: Farris Center (capacity: 6,000)
- Conference: UAC
- Nickname: Sugar Bears
- Colors: Purple and gray

NCAA Division I tournament appearances
- 2016, 2017

NCAA Division II tournament Elite Eight
- 2003, 2005
Other NCAA Division II tournament results
| Sweet Sixteen | 2003, 2005 |
| Appearances | 1996, 2003, 2004, 2005 |

Conference tournament champions
- Southland: 2016, 2017

Conference regular-season champions
- Southland: 2017 (Tied)

For information on all University of Central Arkansas sports, see Central Arkansas Bears and Sugar Bears
For information about the Central Arkansas men's team, see Central Arkansas Bears basketball.

The Central Arkansas Sugar Bears basketball team is the women's basketball team that represents the University of Central Arkansas (UCA) in Conway, Arkansas. The Sugar Bears compete in the United Athletic Conference. They completed a 15-season tenure in the Southland Conference in 2020–21. The Sugar Bears are coached by Tony Kemper.

== Postseason ==
- Division I: At the NCAA Division I level, the Sugar Bears have competed in two NCAA tournaments with a combined record of 0–2 (2016 and 2017). The Sugar Bears have competed in two WNIT tournaments with a record of 0–2 (2012 and 2025). The team has competed in two Women's Basketball Invitational tournament with a record of 3–2 (2011 and 2018).
- Division II: The Sugar Bears competed in six NCAA Division II tournaments with a combined record of 8–4 (1996, 2003, 2004, and 2005). The 2003 and 2005 teams competed at the Elite Eight level.
- NAIA: As an NAIA member, Central Arkansas competed in two national tournaments (1984 and 1991); two Bi-District Playoff tournaments (1984 and 1985); and one Area V Regional tournament (1983). The overall record for NAIA postseason play was 2–4.

=== NCAA Division I ===
The Sugar Bears have made two appearances in the NCAA Division I women's basketball tournament. They have a combined record of 0–2.

| Year | Round | Opponent | Result |
|---|---|---|---|
| 2016 | First Round | #3 Louisville | L 60–87 |
| 2017 | First Round | #3 Texas | L 50–78 |

=== NCAA Division II ===
The Sugar Bears made five appearances in the NCAA Division II women's basketball tournament. They had a combined record of 10–5.

| Year | Round | Opponent | Result |
|---|---|---|---|
| 1996 | First round Regional semifinals | Fort Valley State; Florida Southern | W, 68–55; L, 93–97 |
| 2002 | First round Regional semifinals Regional finals | West Alabama; Delta State; Florida Tech | W, 68–65; W, 98–89; L, 64–71 |
| 2003 | First round Regional semifinals Regional finals Elite Eight | Rollins; Henderson State; Arkansas Tech; Bentley | W, 74–55; W, 59–58; W, 68–54; L, 69–80 |
| 2004 | First round | Fort Valley State | L, 77–79 |
| 2005 | First round Second Round; Third round Elite Eight; Final Four | Rollins; Fort Valley State; Henderson State; Shaw; Washburn | W, 88–58; W, 103–88; W, 76–71; W, 87–73; L, 67–69 |

=== NAIA Division I ===
The Sugar Bears made two appearances in the NAIA Division I women's basketball tournament, with a combined record of 1–2.

| Year | Seed | Round | Opponent | Result |
|---|---|---|---|---|
| 1984 | #8 | First round | NR UNC Asheville | L, 60–62 |
| 1991 | #16 | First round Second Round | NR Berry #1 Claflin | W, 86–80; L, 77–93 |

== See also ==
- Central Arkansas Bears basketball
