= 1984 NAIA men's basketball tournament =

College basketball tournament

- Teams: 32
- Finals site: Kemper Arena, Kansas City, Missouri
- Champions: Fort Hays State (1 title, 1 title game, 4 Fab Four)
- Runner-up: Wisconsin Stevens Point (1 title game, 1 Fab Four)
- Semifinalists: Chicago State (1 Final Four); Westmont (1 Final Four)
- Charles Stevenson Hustle Award: Brad Soderberg (Wisconsin Stevens Point)
- Chuck Taylor MVP: Terry Porter (Wisconsin Stevens Point)

The 1984 NAIA men's basketball tournament was held in March at Kemper Arena in Kansas City, Missouri. The 47th annual NAIA basketball tournament featured 32 teams playing in a single-elimination format. Fort Hays State became the champions.

== Awards and honors ==
- Leading scorers:
- Leading rebounder:
- Player of the Year: est. 1994.

== Bracket ==
First round	Second round
1	West Virginia Wesleyan	113
Cabrini	73
1	West Virginia Wesleyan	86
16	William Carey	65
16	William Carey	95
Missouri Western State	74
TOP TIER
9	Wisconsin–Stevens Point	63
Hillsdale	51
9	Wisconsin–Stevens Point	51
Arkansas College	46
Arkansas College	65*
8	Walsh	58
5	St. Thomas Aquinas	75
Phillips	65
5	St. Thomas Aquinas	74
Central Washington	64
Central Washington	75
12	Carson Newman	74
TOP TIER
13	Pembroke State	98
Marycrest (Iowa)	78
13	Pembroke State	54
4	Westmont	63
North Georgia	52
4	Westmont	81
3	Chicago State	79
Franklin Pierce	62
3	Chicago State	105**
Kearney State	104
Kearney State	84
14	Northern State (SD)	59
BOTTOM TIER
11	Cumberland (KY)	73
College of Idaho	71
11	Cumberland (KY)	77
6	Chaminade	86
6	Chaminade	73
Midwestern State	60
7	Denver	56
Waynesburg	58*
Waynesburg	61
10	St. Mary’s (TX)	59
St. John’s (MN)	49
10	St. Mary’s (TX)	60
BOTTOM TIER
15	Birmingham Southern	60
Central Wesleyan	63
Central Wesleyan	68
2	Fort Hays State	76
Taylor	47
2	Fort Hays State	70

Elite Eight
1	West Virginia Wesleyan	50
9	Wisconsin–Stevens Point	77
5	St. Thomas Aquinas	65
4	Westmont	78
3	Chicago State	68
6	Chaminade	66
Waynesburg	55
2	Fort Hays State	87

NAIA national semifinals
9	Wisconsin-Stevens Point	79
4	Westmont	53
3	Chicago State	84
2	Fort Hays State	86*

NAIA national championship
9	Wisconsin–Stevens Point	46
2	Fort Hays State	48*
NAIA third-place game
4	Westmont	82
3	Chicago State	86*

- * denotes overtime.

== See also ==
- 1984 NCAA Division I men's basketball tournament
- 1984 NCAA Division II men's basketball tournament
- 1984 NCAA Division III men's basketball tournament
- 1984 NAIA women's basketball tournament
