= 1984 NCAA Division II women's basketball tournament =

American collegiate basketball tournament

- Teams: 24
- Finals site: , Springfield, Massachusetts
- Champions: Central Missouri State Jennies (1st title)
- Runner-up: Virginia Union Panthers (2nd title game)
- Semifinalists: Dayton Flyers (1st Final Four); Valdosta State Blazers (1st Final Four)
- Winning coach: Jorja Hoehn, CMSU (1st title)
- MOP: Carla Eades (Central Missouri State)

The 1984 NCAA Division II women's basketball tournament was the third annual tournament hosted by the NCAA to determine the national champion of women's collegiate basketball among its Division II membership in the United States.

Central Missouri State defeated defending champions Virginia Union in the championship game, 80–73, claiming the Jennies' first Division II national title.

The championship rounds were contested at the Springfield Civic Center in Springfield, Massachusetts, hosted by Springfield College.

== Regionals ==
=== East ===
First round - site unknown Round of 24; March 6		Regional finals - at Army; Sweet 16; March 10
		Utica	53
Millersville	58	Army	59
Utica	66

=== Great Lakes ===
First round - at Lewis; Round of 24; March 6		Regional finals - at Dayton; Sweet 16; March 10
		Dayton	97
Lewis	63	Northwest Missouri State	69
Northwest Missouri State	81

=== New England ===
First round - at Bentley; Round of 24; March 6		Regional finals - at Quinnipiac; Sweet 16; March 10
		Quinnipiac	71
Bentley	61	Bentley	50
Central Florida	44

=== North Central ===
First round - at North Dakota; Round of 24; March 6		Regional finals - at St. Cloud State; Sweet 16; March 10
		St. Cloud State	66
North Dakota	48	South Dakota	55
South Dakota	49

=== South ===
First round - at Alabama A&M; Round of 24; March 6		Regional finals - at Valdosta State; Sweet 16; March 10
		Valdosta State	81
Alabama A&M	59	North Alabama	76
North Alabama	78

=== South Atlantic ===
First round - at North Carolina Central; Round of 24; March 6		Regional finals - at Mount St. Mary's; Sweet 16; March 10
		Mount St. Mary's	58
Virginia Union	75	Virginia Union	59
North Carolina Central	51

=== South Central ===
First round - at Southeast Missouri State; Round of 24; March 6		Regional finals - at Central Missouri State; Sweet 16; March 10
		Central Missouri State	76
Howard Payne	50	Southeast Missouri State	64
Southeast Missouri State	88

=== West ===
First round - at Chapman; Round of 24; March 6		Regional finals - at Cal Poly Pomona; Sweet 16; March 10
		Cal Poly Pomona	60
Chapman	75	Chapman	69
San Francisco State	60

== National Finals - Springfield, Massachusetts ==
Visiting team listed first in Elite Eight

Final Four Location: Springfield Civic Center Host: Springfield College

National quarterfinals Elite Eight; March 15
SA	Virginia Union	72
NE	Quinnipiac	67
NC	St. Cloud State	56
GL	Dayton	80
S	Valdosta State	92
E	Army	65
W	Chapman	59
SC	Central Missouri State	77

National semifinals Final Four; March 22
SA	Virginia Union	71
GL	Dayton	59
S	Valdosta State	70
SC	Central Missouri State	74

National championship March 24
SA	Virginia Union	73
SC	Central Missouri State	80

== All-tournament team ==
- Carla Eades, Central Missouri State
- Veta Williams, Virginia Union
- Janice Washington, Valdosta State
- Rosie Jones, Central Missouri State
- Donna Burks, Dayton

== See also ==
- 1984 NCAA Division I women's basketball tournament
- 1984 NCAA Division III women's basketball tournament
- 1984 NCAA Division II men's basketball tournament
- 1984 NAIA women's basketball tournament
