= 2026–27 Holy Cross Crusaders women's basketball team =

American college basketball season

2026–27 Holy Cross Crusaders women's basketball
- Conference: Patriot League
- Record: 2–1 (0–0 Patriot)
- Head coach: Candice Green (3rd season)
- Assistant coaches: Kat Fogarty; Anita Jennings; Nick Dicciani
- Home arena: Hart Center Arena

2026–27 Patriot League women's basketball standings
	Conf.				Overall
Team	W		L	PCT	W		L	PCT
Army	0	–	0	–	2	–	0	1.000
Holy Cross	0	–	0	–	2	–	0	1.000
Colgate	0	–	0	–	1	–	0	1.000
Loyola	0	–	0	–	1	–	1	.500
Navy	0	–	0	–	1	–	1	.500
Lafayette	0	–	0	–	1	–	1	.500
American	0	–	0	–	0	–	1	.000
Boston University	0	–	0	–	0	–	2	.000
Bucknell	0	–	0	–	0	–	2	.000
Lehigh	0	–	0	–	0	–	2	.000
† 2027 Patriot League tournament winner As of November 10, 2026

The 2026–27 Holy Cross Crusaders women's basketball team currently represents the College of the Holy Cross during the 2026–27 NCAA Division I women's basketball season. The Crusaders, led by third-year head coach Candice Green, play their home games at the Hart Center Arena in Worcester, Massachusetts, and compete as a member of the Patriot League.

== Previous season ==
The Crusaders finished the 2025–26 season 23–10 overall and 14–4 in Patriot League play, finishing second in the conference. As the No. 2 seed in the Patriot League tournament, they defeated No. 10 Colgate 72–36 in the quarterfinals and No. 3 Army 61–55 in the semifinals, advancing to the championship game where they defeated No. 4 seed Lehigh 77–70 to win their third Patriot League title in four seasons, and clinch the automatic berth to the NCAA tournament.

At the NCAA tournament, the Crusaders were seeded No. 15 in the Fort Worth #3 Regional. They lost to No. 2 seed Michigan 48–83 to end their season.

== Offseason ==
=== Departures ===
Holy Cross departures
Name	Num.	Pos.	Height	Year	Hometown	Reason for departure
Kimora Berry	1	Guard/Forward	5'8"	Freshman	Buffalo, NY	Transferred to Niagara
Meg Calahan	4	Forward	6'2"	Senior	Middletown, NJ	Graduated
Kaitlyn Flanagan	5	Guard	5'8"	Senior	Plymouth Meeting, PA	Graduated
Asia Wilson	13	Guard	5'5"	Freshman	Rochester, NY	Transferred to Buffalo
Simone Foreman	24	Guard	5'9"	Senior	Washington, D.C.	Graduated
Mary-Elizabeth Donnelly	33	Guard	5'11"	Senior	Manasquan, NJ	Graduated

=== Incoming transfers ===
Holy Cross incoming transfers
Name	Num.	Pos.	Height	Year	Hometown	Previous school
Colleen Phiri	2	Guard	5'11"	Sophomore	Haverhill, MA	George Washington
Emma Lizotte	14	Forward	6'3"	Junior	Saco, ME	Quinnipiac

=== Recruiting class ===
There was no 2026 recruiting class.

== Preseason ==
On October 1, 2026, the Patriot League released their annual preseason coaches poll. Holy Cross was picked to finish fourth in the conference.

=== Preseason rankings ===
Patriot League Preseason Poll
Place	Team	Votes
1	Navy	81 (9)
2	Army	71
3	Lehigh	67 (1)
4	Holy Cross	53
5	Lafayette	52
6	Bucknell	37
7	Boston University	26
8	Colgate	22
9	Loyola Maryland	21
10	American	20
(#) first-place votes

=== Preseason All-Patriot League Team ===
No players were named to the Preseason All-Patriot League Team.

== Roster ==
2026–27 Holy Cross Crusaders women's basketball team
Players
Coaches

Pos.	#	Name	Height	Year	Previous school	Hometown
G	1	Maddie Provost	5 ft 8 in (1.73 m)	Fr	Lawrence High School	Albion, ME
G	2	Colleen Phiri	5 ft 11 in (1.8 m)	So	Tilton School; George Washington	Haverhill, MA
G	5	Camden Epstein	5 ft 10 in (1.78 m)	Fr	Ramapo High School	Wyckoff, NJ
G	10	Stella Gougoufkas	5 ft 9 in (1.75 m)	Jr	James Madison High School	Vienna, VA
G	11	Brianna McDermott	5 ft 6 in (1.68 m)	So	Greenwich Country Day School	Yonkers, NY
F	14	Emma Lizotte	6 ft 3 in (1.91 m)	Jr	Thornton Academy; Quinnipiac	Saco, ME
F/C	20	Mackenzie Teevan	6 ft 4 in (1.93 m)	So	Holmdel High School	Holmden, NJ
G	21	Janie Bachmann	5 ft 11 in (1.8 m)	Sr	St. John Vianney High School	Holmden, NJ
F	22	Simone Lewis	6 ft 0 in (1.83 m)	Sr	Georgetown Visitation Prep	Lanham, MD
G	23	Megan Roche	5 ft 6 in (1.68 m)	So	Dexter Southfield School	Millis, MA
G	25	Hannah Griffin	5 ft 6 in (1.68 m)	Sr	Gwynedd Mercy Academy	Conshohocken, PA
G	32	Kendall Eddy	5 ft 7 in (1.7 m)	Sr	Brooks School; Providence	Haverhill, MA
F	35	Abigail Casper	6 ft 0 in (1.83 m)	Fr	Northwest Catholic High School	Cromwell, CT
F	44	Gracynn Gough	6 ft 0 in (1.83 m)	Jr	Charlotte Catholic High School	Charlotte, NC

Head coach

- Candice Green (Colgate)

Assistant coach(es)

- Kat Fogarty (New Hampshire)
- Anita Jennings (Saint Joseph's)
- Nick Dicianni (Temple)

Legend

- (C) Team captain
- (S) Suspended
- (I) Ineligible
- (W) Walk-on
- Injured
- Current redshirt

Roster
Last update: November 5, 2026

== Schedule and results ==
Date time, TV	Rank^{#}	Opponent^{#}	Result	Record	High points	High rebounds	High assists	Site (attendance) city, state
Non-conference regular season
November 2, 2026*; 6:00 p.m., ACCNX		at Boston College	W 64–54	1–0	21 – Bachmann	11 – Griffin	3 – Tied	Conte Forum (536); Chestnut Hill, MA
November 5, 2026*; 6:00 p.m., ESPN+		Dartmouth	W 49-46	2-0	21 – Phiri	8 – Phiri	4 – Griffin	Hart Center Arena (489); Worcester, MA
November 9, 2026*; 6:00 p.m., ESPN+		Harvard	L 42-63	2-1	15 – Eddy	8 – Bachmann	2 – Tied	Hart Center Arena (640); Worcester, MA
November 12, 2026*; 4:30 p.m., ESPN+		at Brown						Pizzitola Sports Center; Providence, RI
November 16, 2026*; 6:00 p.m., ESPN+		Bryant						Hart Center Arena; Worcester, MA
November 22, 2026*; 2:00 p.m.		at Richmond						Robins Center; Richmond, VA
November 25, 2026*; 1:00 p.m., ESPN+		Rhode Island						Hart Center Arena; Worcester, MA
November 30, 2026*; 7:00 p.m., ESPN+		at Sacred Heart						William H. Pitt Center; Fairfield, CT
December 7, 2026*; 6:00 p.m., ESPN+		at UMass						Mullins Center; Amherst, MA
December 16, 2026*; 6:00 p.m., ESPN+		Western Kentucky						Hart Center Arena; Worcester, MA
December 20, 2026*; 12:00 p.m.		at Saint Joseph's; Hawk Classic Semifinal						Michael J. Hagan '85 Arena; Philadelphia, PA
December 21, 2026*; 11:00 a.m./1:00 p.m.		vs. Liberty or Washington State; Hawk Classic						Michael J. Hagan '85 Arena; Philadelphia, PA
Patriot League regular season
December 30, 2026; 6:00 p.m., ESPN+		at Army						Christl Arena; West Point, NY
January 2, 2027; 2:00 p.m., ESPN+		American						Hart Center Arena; Worcester, MA
January 6, 2027; 6:00 p.m., ESPN+		at Navy						Alumni Hall; Annapolis, MD
January 9, 2027; 2:00 p.m., ESPN+		Loyola Maryland						Hart Center Arena; Worcester, MA
January 13, 2027; 10:30 a.m., ESPN+		Lehigh						Hart Center Arena; Worcester, MA
January 16, 2027; 2:00 p.m., ESPN+		at Colgate						Cotterell Court; Hamilton, NY
January 20, 2027; 6:00 p.m., ESPN+		Bucknell						Hart Center Arena; Worcester, MA
January 23, 2027; 2:00 p.m., ESPN+		at Boston University; Turnpike Trophy						Case Gym; Boston, MA
January 27, 2027; 6:00 p.m., ESPN+		Army						Hart Center Arena; Worcester, MA
January 30, 2027; 1:00 p.m., ESPN+		at Loyola Maryland						Reitz Arena; Baltimore, MD
February 3, 2027; 6:00 p.m., ESPN+		Lafayette						Hart Center Arena; Worcester, MA
February 6, 2027; 3:00 p.m., ESPN+		Navy						Hart Center Arena; Worcester, MA
February 10, 2027; 6:00 p.m., ESPN+		at Bucknell						Sojka Pavilion; Lewisburg, PA
February 13, 2027; TBA, ESPN+		at Lehigh						Stabler Arena; Bethelehem, PA
February 17, 2027; 6:00 p.m., ESPN+		Colgate						Hart Center Arena; Worcester, MA
February 20, 2027; 2:00 p.m., ESPN+		Boston University; Turnpike Trophy						Hart Center Arena; Worcester, MA
February 23, 2027; 6:00 p.m., ESPN+		at Lafayette						Kirby Sports Center; Easton, PA
February 26, 2027; 5:00 p.m., ESPN+		at American						Bender Arena; Washington, D.C.
Patriot League tournament
March 1–9, 2027; TBA								TBD
*Non-conference game. ^{#}Rankings from AP poll. (#) Tournament seedings in parentheses. All times are in Eastern.
