= 1984 NCAA Division III women's basketball tournament =

- Teams: 32
- Finals site: , Scranton, Pennsylvania
- Champions: Rust Bearcats (1st title)
- Runner-up: Elizabethtown Blue Jays (3rd title game)
- Third place: Salem State Vikings (1st Final Four)
- Fourth place: North Central Cardinals (2nd Final Four)
- Winning coach: A.J. Stoval (1st title)
- MOP: Page Lutz (Elizabethtown)

The 1984 NCAA Division III women's basketball tournament was the third annual tournament hosted by the NCAA to determine the national champion of Division III women's collegiate basketball in the United States.

Rust defeated Elizabethtown in the championship game, 51–49, to claim the Bearcats' first Division III national title.

The championship rounds were hosted in Scranton, Pennsylvania.

== Bracket ==
=== First Round ===
- Susquehanna 77, Allegheny 61
- Elizabethtown 67, Scranton 58
- TCNJ 78, Rochester (NY) 58
- Buffalo St. 81, New Rochelle 67
- Eastern Conn. St. 54, Bridgewater St. 48
- Salem St. 69, WPI 50
- Stockton 77, Ohio Northern 69
- Kean 79, Muskingum 69
- Pitt.-Johnstown 64, Wis.-Whitewater 60
- Wis.-La Crosse 77, Carroll (WI) 67
- North Central (IL) 65, William Penn 57
- Gettysburg 79, Millikin 74
- Concordia-M’head 77, Pomona-Pitzer 58
- Bishop 71, St. Thomas (MN) 67
- Knoxville 82, UNC Greensboro 74
- Rust 83, Va. Wesleyan 65

=== Regional Finals ===
- Elizabethtown 73, Susquehanna 71
- TCNJ 63, Buffalo St. 60
- Salem St. 66, Eastern Conn. St. 54
- Kean 62, Stockton 54
- Pitt.-Johnstown 88, Wis.-La Crosse 64
- North Central (IL) 85, Gettysburg 74
- Bishop 73, Concordia-M’head 71
- Rust 80, Knoxville 76

=== National finals ===
National quarterfinals
Elizabethtown	80
Trenton State	58
Salem State	63
Kean	58
North Central (IL)	105
Pittsburgh–Johnstown	101
Rust	91
Bishop	68

National semifinals
Elizabethtown	80
Salem State	58
North Central (IL)	78
Rust	79

National championship
Elizabethtown	49
Rust	51
National third-place game
Salem State	90
North Central (IL)	85

== All-tournament team ==
- Page Lutz, Elizabethtown (MOP)
- Shelley Parks, Elizabethtown
- Brenda Christian, Rust
- Evelyn Oquendo, Salem State
- Cheryl Juris, North Central (IL)

== See also ==
- 1984 NCAA Division I women's basketball tournament
- 1984 NCAA Division II women's basketball tournament
- 1984 NCAA Division III men's basketball tournament
- 1984 NAIA women's basketball tournament
