= 1984 NAIA women's basketball tournament =

Women's basketball tournament

- Teams: 16
- Finals site: , Cedar Rapids, Iowa
- Champions: UNC Asheville (1st title, 1st title game, 1st Fab Four)
- Runner-up: Portland (1st title game, 2nd Fab Four)
- Semifinalists: Berry (2nd Fab Four); Dillard (1st Fab Four)
- Coach of the year: Helen Carroll (UNC Asheville)
- Charles Stevenson Hustle Award: Valencia Allen (Dillard)
- Chuck Taylor MVP: Sheila Ford (UNC Asheville)
- Top scorer: Sheila Ford (UNC Asheville) (111 points)

The 1984 NAIA women's basketball tournament was the fourth annual tournament held by the NAIA to determine the national champion of women's college basketball among its members in the United States and Canada.

UNC Asheville defeated Portland in the championship game, 72–70 after one overtime period, to claim the Bulldogs' first NAIA national title.

The tournament was played in Cedar Rapids, Iowa.

== Qualification ==
The tournament field expanded for the first time since its establishment, increasing from eight to sixteen teams. The top eight teams were seeded.

The tournament utilized a simple single-elimination format, with an additional third-place game for the two teams that lost in the semifinals.

== Bracket ==
Round of 16
1	SW Oklahoma State	81
Georgian Court	52
UNC Asheville	62
8	Central Arkansas	60
5	Carson-Newman	85
Charleston (WV)	93
Jamestown (ND)	73
4	Dillard	81
3	Portland	74
Wisconsin–Milwaukee	63
St. Ambrose	68
6	Francis Marion	81
7	Berry	74
Tarleton State	65
Biola	56
2	Saginaw Valley	76

Quarterfinals
1	SW Oklahoma State	54
UNC Asheville	57
Charleston (WV)	84
4	Dillard	102
3	Portland	91
6	Francis Marion	79
7	Berry	70
2	Saginaw Valley	53

Semifinals
UNC Asheville	81
4	Dillard	64
3	Portland	72
7	Berry	58

National championship
UNC Asheville	72*
3	Portland	70
National third place
4	Dillard	70
7	Berry	66

== See also ==
- 1984 NCAA Division I women's basketball tournament
- 1984 NCAA Division II women's basketball tournament
- 1984 NCAA Division III women's basketball tournament
- 1984 NAIA men's basketball tournament
