= Les Botham =

Australian cricketer

Personal information
- Full name: Leslie John Botham
- Born: 5 May 1930; Melbourne, Australia
- Died: 17 April 1999 (aged 68); Melbourne, Australia

Domestic team information
- Years: Team
- 1956-1960: Victoria
- Source: Cricinfo, 3 December 2015

Les Botham (5 May 1930 – 17 April 1999) was an Australian cricketer. He played eight first-class cricket matches for Victoria between 1956 and 1960.

== See also ==
- List of Victoria first-class cricketers
