= Sandy Botham =

American basketball player and coach

Current position
- Title: Alumni relations
- Team: Milwaukee
- Conference: Horizon League
- Record: 236–204

Biographical details
- Born: December 12, 1965 (age 60); Madison, Wisconsin

Playing career
- 1984–1988: Notre Dame

Coaching career (HC unless noted)
- 1991–1995: Notre Dame (assistant)
- 1995–1996: Beloit
- 1996–2012: Milwaukee
- 2017–2019: Sheboygan South HS

Head coaching record
- Overall: 236–204
- Tournaments: 0–2 (NCAA Division I); 1–1 (NCAA Division III)

Accomplishments and honors

Championships
- 2 Horizon League Tournament (2001, 2006); 2 Horizon League Regular Season (2001, 2006)

Awards
- Horizon League Coach of the Year (1997, 2001, 2006)

Sandra Lee Botham (born December 12, 1965) was the head coach of the NCAA Division I Milwaukee Panthers women's basketball team, which competes in the Horizon League. She resigned in April 2012, to take a position in the Alumni Relations area.

== Career ==
Through her nine years as a head coach, she has compiled a 143–110 record, including a 98–61 mark in conference play. She led the Panthers to their first ever NCAA tournament appearance, and their first ever 20 win season. She attended the University of Notre Dame, where she became an All-American and earned her B. A. In 1988.

In the 2015–16 school year, Botham was athletic director at Madison West High School in Madison, Wisconsin before leaving amidst allegations of racial discrimination against two coaches. On June 1, 2017, Sheboygan South High School in Sheboygan hired Botham as girls' varsity basketball head coach.

== Notre Dame statistics ==
Legend
GP	Games played	GS	Games started	MPG	Minutes per game
FG%	Field goal percentage	3P%	3-point field goal percentage	FT%	Free throw percentage
RPG	Rebounds per game	APG	Assists per game	SPG	Steals per game
BPG	Blocks per game	PPG	Points per game	**Bold**	Career high

Year	Team	GP	Points	FG%	3P%	FT%	RPG	APG	SPG	BPG	PPG
1984–85	Notre Dame	28	262	52.9%	—	69.7%	5.1	0.4	**0.8**	0.1	9.4
1985–86	Notre Dame	**31**	423	63.9%	—	75.2%	7.2	0.8	0.6	**0.5**	13.6
1986–87	Notre Dame	27	327	56.1%	—	70.8%	7.1	0.9	0.6	0.5	12.1
1987–88	Notre Dame	28	**448**	**60.5%**	0.0%	**76.2%**	**7.8**	**1.0**	0.7	0.3	**16.0**
Career		114	1460	58.8%	0.0%	73.7%	6.8	0.8	0.7	0.4	12.8

== Head coaching record ==
Record table
Season	Team	Overall	Conference	Standing	Postseason
**Beloit Buccaneers** (1995–1996)
1995–96	Beloit	22–4			NCAA Division III Second Round
Beloit:		22–4			
**Milwaukee Panthers** (Horizon League) (1996–2012)
1996–97	Milwaukee	16–12	10–6	4th	
1997–98	Milwaukee	15–12	7–7	4th	
1998–99	Milwaukee	11–16	7–7	5th	
1999–00	Milwaukee	16–12	10–4	2nd	
2000–01	Milwaukee	19–11	12–2	t–1st	NCAA First Round
2001–02	Milwaukee	20–8	14–2	2nd	
2002–03	Milwaukee	15–13	11–5	t–2nd	
2003–04	Milwaukee	17–12	12–4	2nd	
2004–05	Milwaukee	14–14	11–5	t–2nd	
2005–06	Milwaukee	22–9	14–2	t–1st	NCAA First Round
2006–07	Milwaukee	15–16	10–6	4th	
2007–08	Milwaukee	17–14	11–7	t–2nd	
2008–09	Milwaukee	15–18	7–11	7th	
2009–10	Milwaukee	12–19	6–12	7th	
2010–11	Milwaukee	12–18	9–9	t–5th	
2011–12	Milwaukee	9–21	5–13	t8th	
Milwaukee:		245–225	156–102		
Total:		267–229			
National champion Postseason invitational champion Conference regular season champion Conference regular season and conference tournament champion Division regular season champion Division regular season and conference tournament champion Conference tournament champion
