= UNC Asheville Bulldogs women's basketball =

2025–26 UNC Asheville Bulldogs women's basketball team
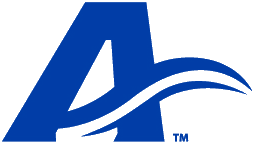
- University: University of North Carolina at Asheville
- Head coach: Tynesha Lewis (1st season)
- Location: Asheville, North Carolina
- Arena: Kimmel Arena (capacity: 3,200)
- Conference: Big South
- Nickname: Bulldogs
- Colors: Royal blue and white

NCAA Division I tournament appearances
- 2007, 2016, 2017

Conference tournament champions
- 2007, 2016, 2017

Conference regular-season champions
- 2016

The UNC Asheville Bulldogs women's basketball team is the women's basketball team that represents the University of North Carolina at Asheville in Asheville, North Carolina, United States. The school's team currently competes in the Big South Conference.

== History ==
UNC Asheville began play in 1975. Prior to their competition in NCAA, they won the NAIA Women's Basketball Championships in 1984, 72–70 in overtime, over Portland. As of the end of the 2016–17 season, they have an all-time record of 432–709. They have won the Big South title once in the regular season (2016), finished as tournament runner up in 1998 and 2005 but also have won three tournament titles (2007, 2016, 2017), making the NCAA Tournament in those three years.

== Postseason results ==
=== NCAA Division I ===
Year	Seed	Round	Opponent	Result
2007	#14	First Round	#3 LSU	L 39−77
2016	#14	First Round	#3 Kentucky	L 31−85
2017	#16	First Round	#1 South Carolina	L 40−90

=== NAIA Division I ===
Year	Seed	Round	Opponent	Result
1984	—	First Round; Quarterfinals; Semifinals; National Championship	#8 Central Arkansas #1 SW Oklahoma State #4 Dillard #3 Portland	W, 62–60; W, 57–54; W, 81–64; W, 72–70 (OT)
