= Katie Kuester =

American basketball player and coach (born 1990)

Current position
- Title: Head coach
- Team: Army
- Conference: Patriot League
- Record: 26–8 (.765)

Biographical details
- Born: June 16, 1990 (age 36); Media, Pennsylvania, U.S.
- Height: 5 ft 10 in (178 cm)
- Education: Saint Joseph's (2012); Lehigh (2014)

Playing career
- 2008–2012: Saint Joseph's
- Position: Guard

Coaching career (HC unless noted)
- 2014–2015: Loyola (Assistant Coach)
- 2018–2025: Saint Joseph's (Assistant Coach)
- 2025–present: Army

Administrative career (AD unless noted)
- 2012–2013: Lehigh (Director of Basketball Operations)
- 2013–2014: North Carolina (Video Coordinator)
- 2015–2018: Saint Joseph's (Director of Basketball Operations)

Head coaching record
- Overall: 26–8 (.765)
- Tournaments: 2–1 (WNIT)

Accomplishments and honors

Awards
- Maggie Dixon Award (2026)

Katie Kuester (born June 16, 1990) is an American basketball coach who is currently the head coach of the Army Black Knights women's basketball team.

== Early life and playing career ==
Kuester was born in Media, Pennsylvania. She is the daughter of former professional basketball coach and scout John Kuester.

Kuester played guard for the Saint Joseph's Hawks women's basketball team for four years. She played from 2008 to 2012. Kuester wore number 15 during her time playing for the Hawks.

By the time Kuester ended her collegiate basketball career, she was in the top 10 for three-pointers and free throw percentage in Saint Joseph's Women's Basketball history with 167 three-pointers and a .861 free throw percentage.

Kuester was named to the All-Big 5 Second Team in 2010–11 and earned the Atlantic 10 Commissioner's Honor Roll and Saint Joseph's Athletic Director's Honor Roll recognition.

== Coaching career ==
Prior to returning to her alma mater, Kuester was an Assistant Coach for the Loyola Maryland Greyhounds women's basketball team during the 2014–15 season.

In 2015, Kuester was named the Director of Basketball Operations of Saint Joseph's Hawks women's basketball team, and was promoted to Assistant Coach at Saint Joseph's in June 2018. Additionally, Kuester was promoted to Recruiting Coordinator at Saint Joseph's in May 2021.

On May 22, 2025, Kuester was named the head coach of the Army Black Knights women's basketball team.

== Head coaching record ==
Record table
Season	Team	Overall	Conference	Standing	Postseason
Army Black Knights (Patriot League) (2025–present)
2025–26	Army	26–8	14–4	T–2nd	WNIT Great 8
Total:		26–8 (.765)			
National champion Postseason invitational champion Conference regular season champion Conference regular season and conference tournament champion Division regular season champion Division regular season and conference tournament champion Conference tournament champion
