= Milwaukee Panthers women's basketball =

2025–26 Milwaukee Panthers women's basketball team
- University: University of Wisconsin–Milwaukee
- Head coach: Kyle Rechlicz (13th season)
- Location: Milwaukee, Wisconsin
- Arena: Klotsche Center (capacity: 3,500)
- Conference: Horizon League
- Nickname: Panthers
- Colors: Black and gold

NCAA Division I tournament appearances
- 2001, 2006

NAIA second round
- 1984, 1985

NAIA tournament appearances
- 1984, 1985

Conference tournament champions
- Horizon: 2001, 2006

Conference regular-season champions
- WWIAC: 1983, 1984; Horizon: 2001, 2006

Uniforms
Home	Away

The Milwaukee Panthers women's basketball team is an NCAA Division I college basketball team competing in the Horizon League for the University of Wisconsin–Milwaukee. The current head coach is Kyle Rechlicz replacing longtime head coach Sandy Botham in 2012.

The Panthers have also won two conference titles in 2001 and 2006 with that they have won two conference tournament titles in 2001 and 2006.

== History ==
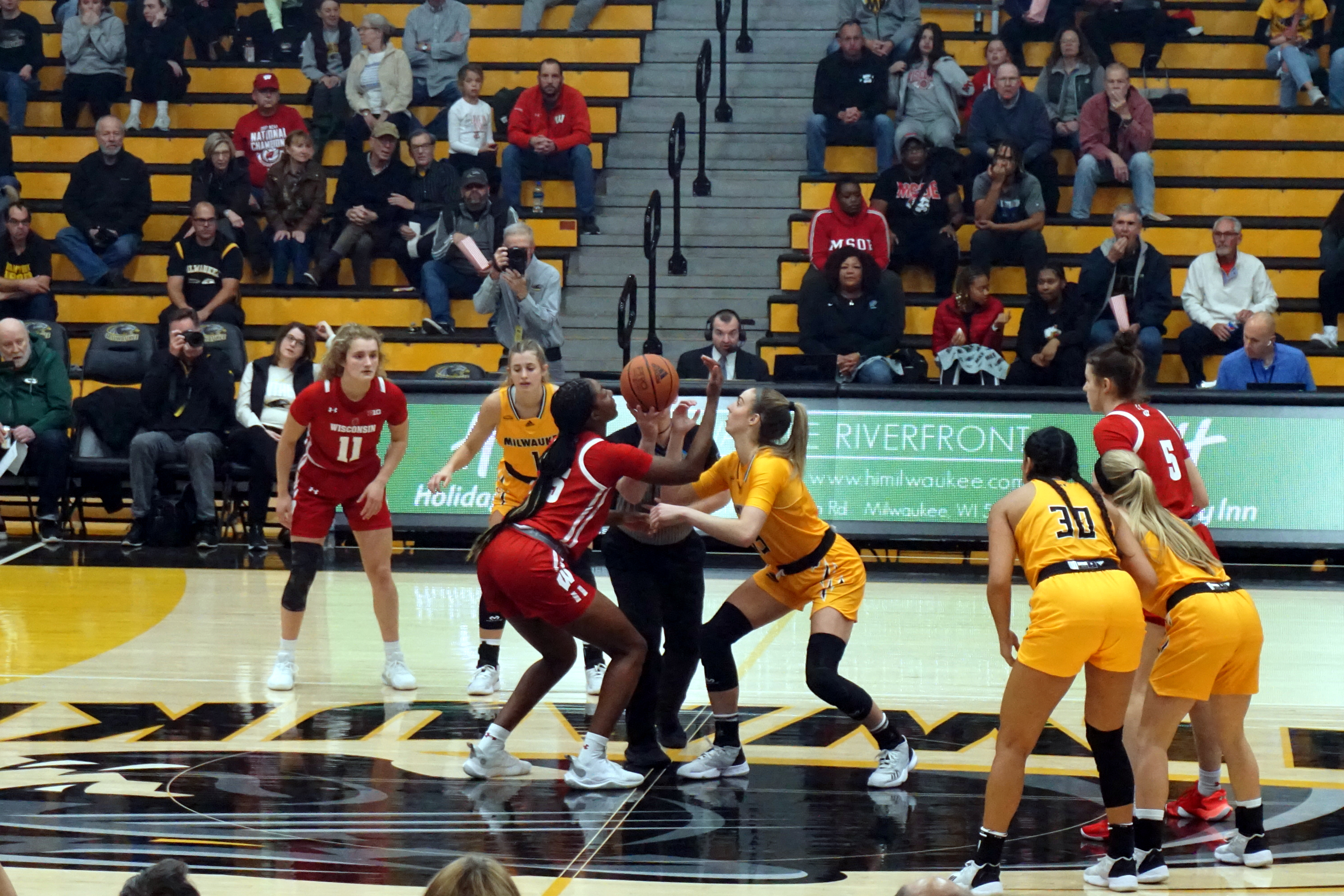
Milwaukee in action against Wisconsin in 2022

The Milwaukee women's basketball teams' began with the 1971–72 school year where they competed at the AIAW level. It moved to NAIA in 1982 before moving to NCAA Division 2 in the 1987 season. Since 1990, the program has been competing in NCAA Division I. It made its first NCAA Tournament appearance in 2001 and its second in 2006.

=== NCAA tournament results ===
The Panthers have appeared in two NCAA Tournaments. Their combined record is 0–2.

Year	Seed	Round	Opponent	Result
2001	#16	First round	#1 Duke	L 96–63
2006	#13	First round	#4 Michigan State	L 65–46

=== WNIT Tournament results ===
The Panthers have appeared in three Women's National Invitation Tournaments. Their combined record is 2–3.

Year	Round	Opponent	Result/Score
2016	First round	Minnesota	L 87–80
2018	First round Second round	Northern Iowa; Indiana	W 81–67; L 54–74
2021	First round Second round	Drake; Saint Louis	W 84–46; L 44–61

=== WBI Tournament results ===
The Panthers have appeared in one Women's Basketball Invitational. Their combined record is 2–1.

Year	Round	Opponent	Result/Score
2017	First round Second round Semi-Finals	Southern Illinois; St. Francis; UNC-Greensboro	W 81–53; W 67–57; L 49–59

=== NAIA Division I ===
The Panthers appeared twice in the NAIA women's basketball tournament. Their combined record was 6–2.

Year	Round	Opponent	Result/Score
1984	District 14; District 14; Bi-District Championship; Round of 16	Marquette; Green Bay; Bemidji State; Portland	W 75–56; W 83–74; W 76–66; L 74–63
1985	District 14; District 14; Bi-District Championship; Round of 16	UW-Eau Claire; Green Bay; Bemidji State; Carson-Newmann	W 87–57; W 72–64; W 71–65; L 71–68

=== Year-by-year records ===
Record table
Season	Coach	Overall	Conference	Standing	Postseason
Milwaukee (AIAW) (1971–1982)
1971–1972	Erika Sander	4–3			
1972–1973	Erika Sander	1–6			
1973–1974	Erika Sander	2–9			
Milwaukee (WWIAC) (1974–1984)
1974–1975	Erika Sander	7–9			
1975–1976	Erika Sander	6–11			
1976–1977	Linda Borowski	1–9			
1977–1978	Nancy Schley	2–16			
1978–1979	M.A. Kelling	5–17	0–6	7th	
1979–1980	M.A. Kelling	17–10	2–2	3rd	
1980–1981	M.A. Kelling	18–12	6–4	3rd	
1981–1982	M.A. Kelling	18–12	7–3	2nd	
Milwaukee (NAIA) (1982–1987)
1982–1983	M.A. Kelling	22–8	5–1	t-1st	
1983–1984	M.A. Kelling	25–8	9–1	1st	NAIA Quarterfinals
1984–1985	M.A. Kelling	25–7			NAIA Quarterfinals
1985–1986	M.A. Kelling	16–12			
1986–1987	M.A. Kelling	20–9			
Milwaukee (NCAA Division II Independent) (1987–1990)
1987–1988	M.A. Kelling	25–5			
1988–1989	M.A. Kelling	19–10			
1989–1990	M.A. Kelling	17–9			
Milwaukee (NCAA Division I Independent) (1990–1993)
1990–1991	M.A. Kelling	11–16			
1991–1992	M.A. Kelling	17–11			
1992–1993	M.A. Kelling	15–12			
Milwaukee (Mid-Continent Conference) (1993–1994)
1993–1994	M.A. Kelling	12–15	9–9	t-6th	
Milwaukee (Horizon League) (1994–Present)
1994–1995	M.A. Kelling	2–25	1–15	12th	
1995–1996	Jenny Sell	4–22	3–13	9th	
1996–1997	Sandy Botham	16–12	10–6	4th	
1997–1998	Sandy Botham	15–12	7–7	4th	
1998–1999	Sandy Botham	11–16	7–7	5th	
1999–2000	Sandy Botham	16–12	10–4	2nd	
2000–2001	Sandy Botham	19–11	12–2	t–1st	NCAA first round
2001–2002	Sandy Botham	20–8	14–2	2nd	
2002–2003	Sandy Botham	15–13	11–5	t–2nd	
2003–2004	Sandy Botham	17–12	12–4	2nd	
2004–2005	Sandy Botham	14–14	11–5	t–2nd	
2005–2006	Sandy Botham	22–9	14–2	t–1st	NCAA first round
2006–2007	Sandy Botham	15–16	10–6	4th	
2007–2008	Sandy Botham	17–14	11–7	t–2nd	
2008–2009	Sandy Botham	15–18	7–11	7th	
2009–2010	Sandy Botham	12–19	6–12	t-5th	
2010–2011	Sandy Botham	12–18	9–9	t-5th	
2011–2012	Sandy Botham	9–21	5–13	t-8th	
2012–2013	Kyle Rechlicz	9–20	5–11	t-6th	
2013–2014	Kyle Rechlicz	8–22	4–12	7th	
2014–2015	Kyle Rechlicz	10–20	5–11	8th	
2015–2016	Kyle Rechlicz	19–13	12–6	t-2nd	WNIT First round
2016–2017	Kyle Rechlicz	22–12	11–7	5th	WBI Semifinals
2017–2018	Kyle Rechlicz	21–12	11–7	3rd	WNIT Second round
2018–2019	Kyle Rechlicz	15–15	10–8	6th	
2019–2020	Kyle Rechlicz	15–16	11–7	5th	
2020–2021	Kyle Rechlicz	20–8	15–5	t–1st	WNIT Second round
2021–2022	Kyle Rechlicz	15–16	13–9	6th	
2022–2023	Kyle Rechlicz	11–19	8–12	t–7th	
2023–2024	Kyle Rechlicz	16–16	10–10	5th	
2024–2025	Kyle Rechlicz	8–24	5–15	11th	
Total:					
National champion Postseason invitational champion Conference regular season champion Conference regular season and conference tournament champion Division regular season champion Division regular season and conference tournament champion Conference tournament champion
