= Army Black Knights women's basketball =

2026–27 Army Black Knights women's basketball team
- University: United States Military Academy
- Head coach: Katie Kuester (2nd season)
- Location: West Point, New York
- Arena: Christl Arena (capacity: 5,043)
- Conference: Patriot
- Nickname: Black Knights
- Colors: Black, gold, and gray

NCAA Division I tournament second round
- Division II; 1984, 1988

NCAA Division I tournament appearances
- Division II; 1984, 1988; Division I 2006, 2014, 2016

Conference tournament champions
- 2006, 2014, 2016

Conference regular-season champions
- 2006, 2013, 2015, 2016

Uniforms
Home	Away

The Army West Point Black Knights women's basketball team is the women's basketball team that represents the United States Military Academy in West Point, New York. The team currently competes in the Patriot League.

== History ==
The Black Knights began to play in 1977. They played in the Metro Atlantic Athletic Conference from 1981 to 1983 and the Empire State Conference from 1984 to 1990 before joining the Patriot League in 1990.

== Postseason appearances ==
=== NCAA Division I Tournament appearances ===
The Black Knights have appeared in the NCAA Division I women's basketball tournament three times. They have a record of 0–3.

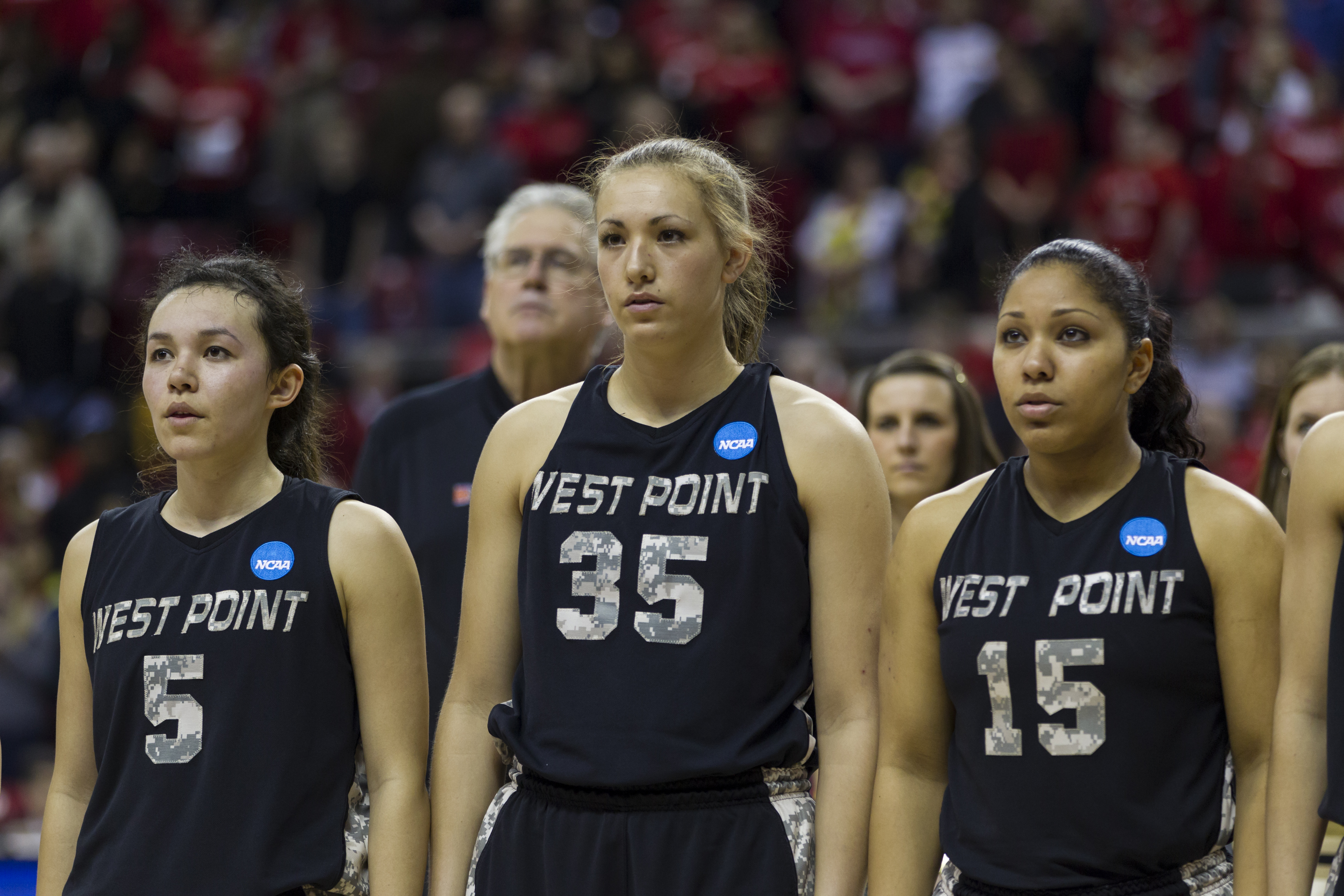
(L-R): #5 Kelsey Minato, head coach Dave Magarity, #35 Dani Failor, and #15 Krishawn Tillett at the 2014 NCAA Division I women's basketball tournament in College Park, Maryland.

Year	Round	Opponent	Result
2006	First Round	Tennessee	L 54–102
2014	First Round	Maryland	L 52–90
2016	First Round	Syracuse	L 56–73

=== WNIT appearances ===
The Black Knights have appeared in the Women's National Invitation Tournament three times. They have a record of 2–2.

Year	Round	Opponent	Result
2013	First Round	Fordham	L 46–55
2015	First Round	St. John's	L 56–64
2026	Second Round; Super 16; Great 8	NJIT; La Salle; TBD	W 59–52; W 74–63; TBD

=== NCAA Division II Tournament appearances ===
The Black Knights had a record of 2–2 in NCAA Division II Tournament appearances in their time spent in Division II.

Year	Round	Opponent	Result
1984	Regional Finals; Quarterfinals	Utica; Valdosta State	W 59–53; L 65–92
1988	Semifinals; Regional Finals	Gannon; Pittsburgh-Jonestown	W 68–53; L 66–71
