= 2026 Patriot League women's basketball tournament =

American college basketball tournament

- Classification: Division I
- Season: 2025–26
- Teams: 10
- Site: Campus sites
- Television: ESPN+, CBSSN

2025–26 Patriot League women's basketball standings
	Conf.				Overall
Team	W		L	PCT	W		L	PCT
Navy	16	–	2	.889	22	–	8	.733
Holy Cross †	14	–	4	.778	23	–	10	.697
Army	14	–	4	.778	26	–	7	.788
Lehigh	11	–	7	.611	17	–	14	.548
Loyola	8	–	10	.444	12	–	18	.400
Lafayette	7	–	11	.389	11	–	19	.367
Bucknell	7	–	11	.389	11	–	19	.367
Boston University	6	–	12	.333	11	–	20	.355
American	5	–	13	.278	7	–	23	.233
Colgate	2	–	16	.111	7	–	24	.226
† 2026 Patriot League tournament winner As of March 25, 2026

The 2026 Patriot League Women's Basketball Tournament was the conference postseason tournament for the Patriot League. The tournament was held March 7-15, 2026 at campus sites of the higher seeds. The winner received the conference's automatic bid to the NCAA Tournament.

== Seeds ==
All ten teams in the conference standings qualified for the tournament. The teams were seeded by record in conference, with a tiebreaker system to seed teams with identical conference records.

The two tiebreakers used by the Patriot League are: 1) head-to-head record of teams with identical record 2) a comparison of records between the tied institutions starting at the highest possible seed and continuing until the tie is broken, and 3) NCAA NET Rankings available on day following the conclusion of Patriot League regular season play.

Seed	School	Conference	Tiebreaker
1	Navy	16–2	
2	Holy Cross	14–4	1–1 vs. Navy
3	Army	14–4	0–2 vs. Navy
4	Lehigh	11–7	
5	Loyola (MD)	8–10	
6	Lafayette	7–11	2–0 vs. Bucknell
7	Bucknell	7–11	0–2 vs. Lafayette
8	Boston University	6–12	
9	American	5–13	
10	Colgate	2–16	

== Schedule ==
Game	Time	Matchup	Score	Television	Attendance
First round – Saturday, March 7
1	2:00 p.m.	No. 8 Boston University vs. No. 9 American	69–58	ESPN+	211
2	4:00 p.m.	No. 7 Bucknell vs. No. 10 Colgate	47–57	ESPN+	253
Quarterfinals – Monday, March 9
3	7:00 p.m.	No. 1 Navy vs. No. 8 Boston University	76–66	ESPN+	365
4	6:00 p.m.	No. 4 Lehigh vs. No. 5 Loyola (MD)	68–54	ESPN+	809
5	6:00 p.m.	No. 3 Army vs. No. 6 Lafayette	65–57	ESPN+	604
6	6:00 p.m.	No. 2 Holy Cross vs. No. 10 Colgate	72–36	ESPN+	732
Semifinals – Thursday, March 12
7	7:00 p.m.	No. 1 Navy vs. No. 4 Lehigh	76–81^{OT}	ESPN+	454
8	6:00 p.m.	No. 2 Holy Cross vs. No. 3 Army	61–55	ESPN+	856
Championship – Sunday, March 15
9	Noon	No. 2 Holy Cross vs. No. 4 Lehigh	77–70	CBSSN	1,315
Game times in ET. Rankings denote tournament seeding. All games hosted by higher-seeded team.

== Bracket ==
First round Saturday, March 7 ESPN+
8	Boston University	69
9	American	58
7	Bucknell	47
10	Colgate	57

Quarterfinals; Monday, March 9 ESPN+
1	Navy	76
8	Boston University	66
4	Lehigh	68
5	Loyola (MD)	54
2	Holy Cross	72
10	Colgate	36
3	Army	65
6	Lafayette	57

Semifinals; Thursday, March 12; ESPN+
1	Navy	76
4	Lehigh	81*
2	Holy Cross	61
3	Army	55

Championship; Sunday, March 15; CBSSN
4	Lehigh	70
2	Holy Cross	77

* denotes overtime period
