= WHS =

WHS may refer to:

== Organizations ==
- WHSmith, a British retailer
- Walgreens Health Services, the healthcare division of Walgreens
- Washington Headquarters Services, a U.S. DoD Field Activity, located at The Pentagon
- Wau Holland Foundation (German: Wau Holland Stiftung), a German charity
- Waverly Hills Sanatorium
- William Hunt and Sons, tool manufacturers from 1780/1793 on, since 1960 a brand of Spear & Jackson
- Wisconsin Historical Society
- Wellstar Health System

=== Schools ===
- Waldron High School (Arkansas)
- Wales High School
- Waltham High School
- Washington High School (disambiguation)
- Washingtonville High School
- Watertown High School (disambiguation)
- Wauconda High School
- Weddington High School
- Weslaco High School
- Wellesley High School
- West High School (disambiguation)
- Western High School (disambiguation)
- Westfield High School (New Jersey)
- Westlake High School (disambiguation)
- Westmount High School
- Wetherby High School
- Wildwood High School
- Williston High School (disambiguation)
- Whitko High School
- Walt Whitman High School (disambiguation)
- Windermere High School
- Woodbridge High School (disambiguation)
- Woodinville High School
- Woodland High School (disambiguation)
- Wylie High School (disambiguation)
- Thomas Sprigg Wootton High School

== Medicine ==
- Wobbly hedgehog syndrome
- Wolf–Hirschhorn syndrome

== Transport ==
- Whyteleafe South railway station, Surrey, National Rail station code

== Other uses ==
- Wood hybrid systems
- Windows Home Server
- World Handicap System, a global handicapping system in the sport of golf
- World Heritage Site

== See also ==
- WH (disambiguation)
