= Pinewood =

Pinewood may refer to:

- Pine wood, the wood from pine trees

== Places ==
=== Bahamas ===
- Pinewood (Bahamas Parliament constituency)

=== Canada ===
- Pinewood (North Bay), a neighborhood in North Bay, Ontario, Canada
- Pinewood, Ontario, a township in Ontario, Canada

=== England ===
- Pinewood, Berkshire, a township
- Pinewood, Hampshire, a village
- Pinewood, Suffolk, a fortress

=== United States ===
- Pinewood, Florida, a census-designated place in Miami-Dade County
- Pinewoods Dance Camp in Plymouth, Massachusetts
- Pinewood, Minnesota, an unincorporated area in Beltrami County
- Pinewood, South Carolina, a town in Sumter County
- Pinewood (Nunnelly, Tennessee), a former historic mansion and plantation
- Pinewood Estates, Texas, an unincorporated community in Hardin County
- Pinewoods (Lightfoot, Virginia), a historic home

== Other uses ==
- "Pinewood" (Gotham), an episode of Gotham
- Pinewood Group, an international group of film production studios
  - Pinewood Studios, a film studio in Britain
  - Pinewood Ontario Studios, a film studio in Ontario, Canada
  - Pinewood Iskandar Malaysia Studios, a studio company in Johor, Malaysia
- Pinewood Technologies, a Birmingham, UK car dealership SaaS vendor

== See also ==
- Pinewood derby, a kind of toy car race associated with the Boy Scouts of America

- Pinewood Derby (South Park), a 2009 episode of the television show South Park

- Pinewood Elementary School (disambiguation)
- Pinewood School (disambiguation)
- Piney Woods (disambiguation)
- Pine (disambiguation)
- Wood (disambiguation)
