= 2026–27 Columbia Lions women's basketball team =

Intercollegiate basketball season

2026–27 Columbia Lions women's basketball
- Conference: Ivy League
- Record: 3–3 (0–0 Ivy)
- Head coach: Megan Griffith (11th season)
- Associate head coach: Tyler Cordell
- Assistant coaches: Allie Bassetti; Kizmahr Grell
- Home arena: Levien Gymnasium

2026–27 Ivy League women's basketball standings
	Conf.				Overall
Team	W		L	PCT	W		L	PCT
Princeton	0	–	0	–	6	–	1	.857
Penn	0	–	0	–	5	–	1	.833
Dartmouth	0	–	0	–	4	–	1	.800
Harvard	0	–	0	–	5	–	2	.714
Yale	0	–	0	–	4	–	2	.667
Columbia	0	–	0	–	3	–	2	.600
Cornell	0	–	0	–	3	–	2	.600
Brown	0	–	0	–	2	–	4	.333
† 2027 Ivy League tournament winner As of November 22, 2026

The 2026–27 Columbia Lions women's basketball team currently represents Columbia University during the 2026–27 NCAA Division I women's basketball season. The Lions, led by eleventh-year head coach Megan Griffith, play their home games at Levien Gymnasium in New York City and compete as a member of the Ivy League.

== Previous season ==
The Lions finished the 2025–26 season 25–8 overall and 11–3 in Ivy League play, to finish second in the conference. As the No. 2 seed in the Ivy League tournament, they lost 65–67 in overtime to defending champions No. 3 Harvard in the semifinals.

Following the elimination, the Lions earned an at-large bid to the WBIT, their first appearance in the tournament since its creation. They were seeded No. 4 in the North Dakota State Bracket. They routed unseeded St. John's 74–26 and top seeded North Dakota State 86–57 in the first and second rounds respectively, advancing to the quarterfinals to defeat No. 3 California before taking a 67–50 victory over Wisconsin in the semifinals. Finally, Columbia captured the WBIT championship and their first ever postseason title in program history after defeating BYU 81–64.

== Offseason ==
=== Departures ===
Columbia departures
Name	Number	Pos.	Height	Year	Hometown	Reason for departure
Susie Rafiu	0	Forward	6'1"	Senior	Ipswich, England	Graduated
Perri Page	1	Guard/Forward	5'11"	Senior	Pittsburgh, PA	Graduated
Vasiliki Cholopoulou	7	Guard	5'10"	Freshman	Kozani, Greece	Transferred to Loyola Chicago
María Arrebola	15	Guard/Forward	6'0"	Sophomore	Almería, Spain	TBD; not listed on roster
Shay Shippen	22	Guard	5'11"	Freshman	Idaho Falls, ID	Transferred to Montana

=== Incoming transfers ===
Columbia incoming transfers
Name	Number	Pos.	Height	Year	Hometown	Previous school
Mary Ashley Stevenson	20	Forward	6'2"	Junior	New York, NY	Stanford

=== Recruiting class ===
College recruiting
Name	Hometown	School	Height	Weight	Commit date
Mathis Dritz; W	Westlake Village, CA	Westlake High School	6 ft 1 in (1.85 m)	N/A	
Mathis Dritz; W	Recruit ratings: Rivals: ESPN: (92)				
Overall recruit ranking:
Note: In many cases, Scout, Rivals, 247Sports, On3, and ESPN may conflict in their listings of height and weight.; In these cases, the average was taken. ESPN grades are on a 100-point scale.; Sources: "2026 Player Commits". ESPN. Archived from the original on September 14, 2026.

== Preseason ==
On October 7, 2026, the Ivy League released its annual preseason poll. Columbia was picked to finish second in the conference, along with five first place votes.

=== Preseason rankings ===
Ivy League Preseason Poll
Place	Team	Votes
1	Princeton	161 (15)
2	Columbia	149 (5)
3	Harvard	131 (1)
4	Penn	104
5	Brown	74
6	Cornell	60
7	Yale	48
8	Dartmouth	29
(#) first-place votes

== Roster ==
2026–27 Columbia Lions women's basketball team
Players
Coaches

Pos.	#	Name	Height	Year	Previous school	Hometown
F	2	Alicia Mitchell	6 ft 2 in (1.88 m)	So	Loomis Chaffee School	Springfield, MA
F	3	Eirny Erinugha	6 ft 0 in (1.83 m)	So	Notre Dame High School	Calgary, Alberta
G	4	Fliss Henderson	5 ft 11 in (1.8 m)	Sr	St Luke's Grammar School	North Curl Curl, Australia
G	5	Mia Broom	5 ft 9 in (1.75 m)	Jr	Lakeside School	Seattle, WA
G/F	8	Mathis Dritz	6 ft 2 in (1.88 m)	Fr	Westlake High School	Westlake Village, CA
F	9	Chloe Vella	6 ft 3 in (1.91 m)	Fr	City of London Academy	London, England
G	11	Nasi Simmons	5 ft 9 in (1.75 m)	Jr	Noble and Greenough School	Brockton, MA
G	12	Marija Avlijas	5 ft 10 in (1.78 m)	Sr	ŽKK Art Basket; Ole Miss	Belgrade, Serbia
G	14	Chloe Dix	5 ft 10 in (1.78 m)	Fr	St. Luke's Grammar School	Sydney, Australia
F	20	Mary Ashley Stevenson	6 ft 2 in (1.88 m)	Jr	Dalton School; Stanford	New York, NY
F/C	21	Marta Jaama	6 ft 2 in (1.88 m)	Jr	Tallinn Arte Gymnasium	Tallinn, Estonia
F	23	Hilke Feldrappe	6 ft 3 in (1.91 m)	Sr	Schul- und Leistungssportzentrum Berlin; Missouri	Berlin, Germany
G	24	Riley Weiss	5 ft 10 in (1.78 m)	Sr	North Broward Prep	Hewlett, NY
G/F	42	Blau Tor	6 ft 0 in (1.83 m)	Jr	INS Joaquim Blume	Barcelona, Spain

Head coach

- Megan Griffith (Columbia)

Assistant coach(es)

- Tyler Cordell (Ohio Wesleyan)
- Allie Bassetti (Rowan)
- Kizmahr Grell (Dickinson)

Legend

- (C) Team captain
- (S) Suspended
- (I) Ineligible
- (W) Walk-on
- Injured
- Current redshirt

Roster
Last update: September 14, 2026

== Schedule and results ==
Date time, TV	Rank^{#}	Opponent^{#}	Result	Record	High points	High rebounds	High assists	Site (attendance) city, state
Non-conference regular season
November 2, 2026*; 11:00 a.m., ESPN+		Davidson	W 71–65	1–0	20 – Stevenson	10 – Henderson	7 – Henderson	Levien Gymnasium (2,732); New York, NY
November 6, 2026*; 6:00 p.m., ESPN+		vs. Rhode Island; Scheduling Alliance	W 76–62	2–0	13 – Tied	12 – Henderson	4 – Tied	Curb Event Center (226); Nashville, TN
November 8, 2026*; 3:30 p.m., ESPN+		at Belmont; Scheduling Alliance	W 84–64	3–0	28 – Weiss	13 – Henderson	4 – Henderson	Curb Event Center (767); Nashville, TN
November 12, 2026*; 7:00 p.m., SNY		No. 2 Michigan	L 58–81	3–1	23 – Weiss	6 – Tied	4 – Henderson	Levien Gymnasium (2,506); New York, NY
November 15, 2026*; 1:00 p.m., B1G+		at No. 19т Maryland	L 58–85	3–2	13 – Weiss	6 – Tied	3 – Weiss	Xfinity Center (4,519); College Park, MD
November 21, 2026*; 7:00 p.m., SNY		No. 5 Duke	L 47–71	3–3	12 – Tied	9 – Henderson	5 – Broom	Levien Gymnasium (2,557); New York, NY
November 27, 2026*; 7:30 p.m.		vs. San Diego State; Rainbow Wahine Showdown						Stan Sheriff Center; Honolulu, HI
November 28, 2026*; 5:00 p.m.		at Hawaii; Rainbow Wahine Showdown						Stan Sheriff Center; Honolulu, HI
November 29, 2026*; 6:30 p.m.		vs. Stanford; Rainbow Wahine Showdown						Stan Sheriff Center; Honolulu, HI
December 3, 2026*; 7:00 p.m.		Old Dominion						Levien Gymnasium; New York, NY
December 6, 2026*; 2:00 p.m.		at Wagner						Spiro Sports Center; Staten Island, NY
December 9, 2026*; 11:00 a.m.		at Saint Joseph's						Hagan Arena; Philadelphia, PA
December 13, 2026*; 2:00 p.m.		Seton Hall						Levien Gymnasium; New York, NY
December 16, 2026*; 7:00 p.m.		at Fairfield						Leo D. Mahoney Arena; Fairfield, CT
December 29, 2026*; 7:00 p.m.		Oregon State						Levien Gymnasium; New York, NY
Ivy League regular season
January 3, 2027; 1:00 p.m.		at Cornell						Newman Arena; Ithaca, NY
January 9, 2027; TBA		Harvard						Levien Gymnasium; New York, NY
January 16, 2027; TBA		at Brown						Pizzitola Sports Center; Providence, RI
January 18, 2027; TBA		at Yale						John J. Lee Amphitheater; New Haven, CT
January 23, 2027; TBA		at Dartmouth						Leede Arena; Hanover, NH
January 29, 2027; TBA		Penn						Levien Gymnasium; New York, NY
January 30, 2027; TBA		Princeton						Levien Gymnasium; New York, NY
February 6, 2027; TBA		Cornell						Levien Gymnasium; New York, NY
February 12, 2027; TBA		at Penn						The Palestra; Philadelphia, PA
February 13, 2027; TBA		at Princeton						Jadwin Gymnasium; Princeton, NJ
February 20, 2027; TBA		Dartmouth						Levien Gymnasium; New York, NY
February 26, 2027; TBA		Brown						Levien Gymnasium; New York, NY
February 27, 2027; TBA		Yale						Levien Gymnasium; New York, NY
March 6, 2027; TBA		at Harvard						Lavietes Pavilion; Cambridge, MA
*Non-conference game. ^{#}Rankings from AP Poll. (#) Tournament seedings in parentheses. All times are in Eastern.
