= 2026–27 Brown Bears women's basketball team =

American college basketball season

2026–27 Brown Bears women's basketball
- Conference: Ivy League
- Record: 3–4 (0–0 Ivy)
- Head coach: Monique LeBlanc (7th season)
- Assistant coaches: Tyler Patch; Jason Pellum; Devon Quattrocchi
- Home arena: Pizzitola Sports Center

2026–27 Ivy League women's basketball standings
	Conf.				Overall
Team	W		L	PCT	W		L	PCT
Princeton	0	–	0	–	6	–	1	.857
Penn	0	–	0	–	5	–	1	.833
Dartmouth	0	–	0	–	4	–	1	.800
Harvard	0	–	0	–	5	–	2	.714
Yale	0	–	0	–	4	–	2	.667
Columbia	0	–	0	–	3	–	2	.600
Cornell	0	–	0	–	3	–	2	.600
Brown	0	–	0	–	2	–	4	.333
† 2027 Ivy League tournament winner As of November 22, 2026

The 2026–27 Brown Bears women's basketball team currently represents Brown University during the 2026–27 NCAA Division I women's basketball season. The Bears, led by seventh-year head coach Monique LeBlanc, play their home games at the Pizzitola Sports Center in Providence, Rhode Island and compete as a member of the Ivy League.

== Previous season ==
The Brown finished the 2025–26 season 16–11 overall and 8–6 in Ivy League play, finishing fourth in the conference and qualifying for the Ivy League tournament for the first time since its creation in 2017. As the No. 4 seed, they lost 51–65 in the semifinals to top-seeded Princeton.

== Offseason ==
=== Departures ===
Brown departures
Name	Number	Pos.	Height	Year	Hometown	Reason for departure
Alyssa Moreland	11	Forward	5'11"	Senior	Beverly, MA	Graduated
Mady Calhoun	14	Guard	5'10"	Senior	Barrington, RI	Graduated
Beth Nelson	15	Forward	6'0"	Senior	Murfreesboro, TN	Graduated
Grace Arnolie	21	Guard	5'8"	Senior	Vienna, VA	Graduated
Mackenzie Leahy	22	Guard	5'8"	Senior	West Dundee, IL	Graduated
Ada Anamekwe	23	Forward	6'0"	Senior	Dallas, TX	Graduated, transferred to Mercer

=== Incoming transfers ===
There were no incoming transfers for the 2026–27 season.

=== Recruiting class ===
There was no 2026 recruiting class.

== Preseason ==
On October 7, 2026, the Ivy League released its annual preseason poll. Brown was picked to finish fifth in the conference.

=== Preseason rankings ===
Ivy League Preseason Poll
Place	Team	Votes
1	Princeton	161 (15)
2	Columbia	149 (5)
3	Harvard	131 (1)
4	Penn	104
5	Brown	74
6	Cornell	60
7	Yale	48
8	Dartmouth	29
(#) first-place votes

== Roster ==
2026–27 Brown Bears women's basketball team
Players
Coaches

Pos.	#	Name	Height	Year	Previous school	Hometown
G	1	Charlotte Climenhage	6 ft 1 in (1.85 m)	Sr	Folsom High School; Nevada	Folsom, CA
G	2	Gia Powell	5 ft 8 in (1.73 m)	Jr	Meadowdale High School	Edmonds, WA
G	3	Lindsay Harzich	5 ft 11 in (1.8 m)	So	Benet Academy	Hinsdale, IL
G/F	4	Isabella Wesley	5 ft 10 in (1.78 m)	So	The Dalton School	New York, NY
G	5	Olivia Young	5 ft 11 in (1.8 m)	Sr	Cardinal Gibbons High School	Durham, NC
G	7	Monét Witherspoon	5 ft 8 in (1.73 m)	Jr	John Burroughs School; Tufts	St. Louis, MO
G	8	Sela Klein	5 ft 11 in (1.8 m)	Jr	New Trier Township High School	Wilmette, IL
F	9	Morgan Ross	6 ft 0 in (1.83 m)	So	Head-Royce School	Oakland, CA
G	10	Caitlyn Kramer	5 ft 9 in (1.75 m)	Fr	Pinewood School	Los Altos Hills, CA
G	11	Sophia Eastman	5 ft 10 in (1.78 m)	Fr	Sammamish High School	Bellevue, WA
G	12	Charlotte Adams-Lopez	5 ft 7 in (1.7 m)	So	Bishop Feehan High School	North Attleboro, MA
G	21	Sravya Janapati	5 ft 11 in (1.8 m)	Fr	Paul VI Catholic High School	Ashburn, VA
G	22	Erin Reid	5 ft 10 in (1.78 m)	Fr	Rumson-Fair Haven Regional High School	Fair Haven, NJ
G/F	23	Summer Lee	6 ft 2 in (1.88 m)	Fr	Carrboro High School	Carrboro, NC
F	33	Aima Ofunrein	6 ft 1 in (1.85 m)	So	Stony Point High School	Round Rock, TX
F	99	Nalah Smith	6 ft 3 in (1.91 m)	Fr	Evangelical Christian School	Fort Myers, FL

Head coach

- Monique LeBlanc (Bucknell)

Assistant coach(es)

- Tyler Patch (Rhode Island College)
- Jason Pellum (Connecticut)
- Devon Quattrocchi (Smith)
- James Logan Hatch (Stanford

Legend

- (C) Team captain
- (S) Suspended
- (I) Ineligible
- (W) Walk-on
- Injured
- Current redshirt

Roster
Last update: September 14, 2026

== Schedule and results ==
Date time, TV	Rank^{#}	Opponent^{#}	Result	Record	High points	High rebounds	High assists	Site (attendance) city, state
Non-conference regular season
November 2, 2026*; 6:00 p.m., ESPN+		at Siena	L 71–82	0–1	25 – Powell	15 – Young	6 – Kramer	UHY Center (445); Loudonville, NY
November 5, 2026*; 7:00 p.m., ESPN+		Army	L 56–81	0–2	13 – Smith	6 – Ross	2 – Tied	Pizzitola Sports Center (389); Providence, RI
November 7, 2026*; 3:00 p.m., ESPN+		Bucknell	W 73–61	1–2	18 – Ofunrein	11 – Ofunrein	4 – Wesley	Pizzitola Sports Center (387); Providence, RI
November 12, 2026*; 4:30 p.m., ESPN+		Holy Cross	L 64–77	1–3	–	–	–	Pizzitola Sports Center (338); Providence, RI
November 15, 2026*; 1:00 p.m., ESPN+		at Maine	L 48–53	1–4	–	–	–	Memorial Gymnasium (1,092); Orono, ME
November 19, 2026*; 7:00 p.m., ESPN+		Merrimack	W 58–48	2–4	–	–	–	Pizzitola Sports Center; Providence, RI
November 21, 2026*; 1:00 p.m., ESPN+		UMBC	W 81–77 ^{2OT}	3–4	–	–	–	Pizzitola Sports Center; Providence, RI
November 25, 2026*; 12:00 p.m., ESPN+		at Boston University						Case Gym; Boston, MA
November 29, 2026*; 4:00 p.m., ACC Network		at North Carolina						Carmichael Arena; Chapel Hill, NC
December 2, 2026*; 7:00 p.m., ESPN+		Marist						Pizzitola Sports Center; Providence, RI
December 5, 2026*; 1:00 p.m., ESPN+		George Washington						Pizzitola Sports Center; Providence, RI
December 6, 2026*; 1:00 p.m., ESPN+		Nichols						Pizzitola Sports Center; Providence, RI
December 9, 2026*; 6:00 p.m., ESPN+		at New Hampshire						Lundholm Gymnasium; Durham, NH
December 21, 2026*; 6:00 p.m., ESPN+		at Bryant						Chace Athletic Center; Smithfield, RI
December 30, 2026*; 8:00 p.m., YouTube		at Texas State						Strahan Arena; San Marcos, TX
Ivy League regular season
January 4, 2027; 7:00 p.m., ESPN+		Yale						Pizzitola Sports Center; Providence, RI
January 9, 2027; 2:00 p.m., ESPN+		at Penn						The Palestra; Philadelphia, PA
January 16, 2027; 1:00 p.m., ESPN+		Columbia						Pizzitola Sports Center; Providence, RI
January 18, 2027; 1:00 p.m., ESPN+		Cornell						Pizzitola Sports Center; Providence, RI
January 23, 2027; 2:00 p.m., ESPN+		at Princeton						Jadwin Gymnasium; Princeton, NJ
January 29, 2027; 7:00 p.m., ESPN+		Harvard						Pizzitola Sports Center; Providence, RI
January 30, 2027; 5:00 p.m., ESPN+		Dartmouth						Pizzitola Sports Center; Providence, RI
February 6, 2027; 2:00 p.m., ESPN+		at Yale						John J. Lee Amphitheater; New Haven, CT
February 12, 2027; 7:00 p.m., ESPN+		at Harvard						Lavietes Pavilion; Cambridge, MA
February 13, 2027; 5:00 p.m., ESPN+		at Dartmouth						Leede Arena; Hanover, NH
February 20, 2027; 1:00 p.m., ESPN+		Princeton						Pizzitola Sports Center; Providence, RI
February 26, 2027; TBA, ESPN+		Columbia						Levien Gymnasium; New York, NY
February 27, 2027; TBA, ESPN+		at Cornell						Newman Arena; Ithaca, NY
March 6, 2027; 1:00 p.m., ESPN+		Penn						Pizzitola Sports Center; Providence, RI
*Non-conference game. ^{#}Rankings from AP Poll. (#) Tournament seedings in parentheses. All times are in Eastern.
