= West High School =

West High School may refer to:

== United States ==
- West High School (Phoenix, Arizona), a former high school, 1949–1983
- West High School (Bakersfield, California)
- West High School (Torrance, California)
- West High School (Colorado), Denver, Colorado
- West High School (Sioux City, Iowa)
- West High School (Waterloo, Iowa)
- West High School (Minneapolis, Minnesota), a former high school (1908-1982)
- West High School (Kansas City, Missouri), a former high school (closed 1981), now an apartment building
- West High School (Akron, Ohio), a former high school that became first a junior high school and then apartments for senior citizens
- West High School (Columbus, Ohio)
- West High School (Jackson, Tennessee), abolished in 1992 and merged with South Side High School (Jackson, Tennessee)
- West High School (Knoxville, Tennessee)
- West High School (Texas), West, Texas
- West High School (Utah), Salt Lake City, Utah

== Schools with variant names in the United States ==
- Appleton West High School, Appleton, Wisconsin
- Bellevue West High School, Bellevue, Nebraska
- Billings West High School, Billings, Montana
- Blue Valley West High School, Overland Park, Kansas
- Central Bucks High School West, Doylestown, Pennsylvania
- Davenport West High School, Davenport, Iowa
- Glenbard West High School, Glen Ellyn, Illinois
- Green Bay West High School, Green Bay, Wisconsin
- Iowa City West High School, Iowa City, Iowa
- Joliet West High School, Joliet, Illinois
- Kenmore West Senior High School, Buffalo, New York
- Lakota West High School, Cincinnati, Ohio
- Lee's Summit West High School, Lee's Summit, Missouri
- Lincoln-West High School, Cleveland, Ohio
- Madison West High School, Madison, Wisconsin
- Maine West High School, Des Plaines, Illinois
- Manchester High School West, Manchester, New Hampshire
- Mankato West High School, Mankato, Minnesota
- Merrill F. West High School, Tracy, California
- Millard West High School, Omaha, Nebraska
- Montreal West High School, Montreal, Quebec, Canada
- Niles West High School, Skokie, Illinois
- Oshkosh West High School, Oshkosh, Wisconsin
- Parkway West High School (Ballwin, Missouri)
- Plano West Senior High School, Plano, Texas
- Pocono Mountain West High School, Pocono Summit, Pennsylvania
- Sun Prairie West High School, Sun Prairie, Wisconsin
- Traverse City West Senior High School, Traverse City, Michigan
- Waukesha West High School, Waukesha, Wisconsin
- Wauwatosa West High School, Wauwatosa, Wisconsin
- West Anchorage High School, Anchorage, Alaska
- West Aurora High School, Aurora, Illinois
- West Bend West High School, West Bend, Wisconsin
- West Windsor-Plainsboro High School North, Plainsboro Township, New Jersey
- West Windsor-Plainsboro High School South, Princeton Junction, New Jersey
- Wichita West High School, Wichita, Kansas
- Wilson Magnet High School, formerly West High School, Rochester, New York
- W. F. West High School, Chehalis, Washington

== See also ==
- West (disambiguation)
- Western High School (disambiguation)
- Westlake High School (disambiguation)
- Westmount High School
