= Western High School =

Western High School may refer to:

== United States ==
- Western High School (Anaheim, California), Anaheim, California
- Western High School (Illinois), Barry, Illinois
- Western High School (Florida), Davie, Florida
- Western High School (Indiana), Russiaville, Indiana
- Western High School (Maryland), Baltimore, Maryland
- Western High School (Auburn, Michigan), Auburn, Michigan
- Western High School (Parma, Michigan), Parma, Michigan
- Western International High School, Detroit, Michigan
- Walled Lake Western High School, Commerce Township, Michigan
- Western High School (Nevada), Las Vegas, Nevada, part of the Clark County School District
- Western High School (New Mexico), Silver City, New Mexico
- Western High School (Ohio), Latham, Ohio
- Western High School (Paris, Kentucky), Paris, Kentucky
- Western High School (Louisville, Kentucky), Louisville, Kentucky, now known as Western MST Magnet High School
- Western High School (Washington, D.C.), Washington, D.C., now known as Duke Ellington School of the Arts

== Canada ==
- Western Canada High School, Calgary, Canada

== See also ==
- West High School (disambiguation)
- Western (disambiguation)
