= 2026–27 Penn Quakers women's basketball team =

American college basketball season

2026–27 Penn Quakers women's basketball
- Conference: Ivy League
- Record: 5–1 (0–0 Ivy)
- Head coach: Mike McLaughlin (18th season)
- Associate head coach: Ashley Robinson
- Assistant coaches: Liam Shanahan; Kaity Healy
- Home arena: The Palestra

2026–27 Ivy League women's basketball standings
	Conf.				Overall
Team	W		L	PCT	W		L	PCT
Princeton	0	–	0	–	6	–	1	.857
Penn	0	–	0	–	5	–	1	.833
Dartmouth	0	–	0	–	4	–	1	.800
Harvard	0	–	0	–	5	–	2	.714
Yale	0	–	0	–	4	–	2	.667
Columbia	0	–	0	–	3	–	2	.600
Cornell	0	–	0	–	3	–	2	.600
Brown	0	–	0	–	2	–	4	.333
† 2027 Ivy League tournament winner As of November 21, 2026

The 2026–27 Penn Quakers women's basketball team currently represents the University of Pennsylvania during the 2025–26 NCAA Division I women's basketball season. The Quakers, led by eighteenth-year head coach Mike McLaughlin, play their home games at The Palestra in Philadelphia, Pennsylvania, and compete as a member of the Ivy League.

== Previous season ==
The Quakers finished the 2025–26 season 17–10 overall and 7–7 in Ivy League play, finishing fifth in the conference. They failed to qualify for the Ivy League tournament.

== Offseason ==
=== Departures ===
Penn departures
Name	Number	Pos.	Height	Year	Hometown	Reason for departure
Ruke Ogbevire	3	Guard	5'7"	Freshman	Houston, TX	Transferred to Sam Houston
Saniah Caldwell	4	Guard	5'9"	Senior	Franklin Lakes, NJ	Graduated
Sarah Miller	8	Guard	5'10"	Sophomore	Phoenix, AZ	Transferred to UC Irvine
Simone Sawyer	11	Guard	5'11"	Senior	Lincolnshire, IL	Graduated
Reagan Jamison	14	Guard	6'0"	Sophomore	Vancouver, WA	TBD; not listed on roster
Georgia Heine	15	Guard	6'0"	Senior	Spring Lake Heights, NJ	Graduated
Helena Lasic	24	Forward	6'4"	Junior	Brampton, Ontario	Transferred to Windsor (U Sports) (Note: Entered portal on October 23, 2025, sat out the rest of the 2025–26 season.)
Sarah Gordon	32	Guard	5'11"	Freshman	Vestavia Hills, AL	TBD; not listed on roster

=== Incoming transfers ===
Penn incoming transfers
Name	Number	Pos.	Height	Year	Hometown	Previous school
Candace Lienafa	17	Forward	5'11"	Junior	Longueil, Quebec	Davidson
Christina Pham	30	Guard	5'6"	Sophomore	Boston, MA	Fairfield

=== Recruiting class ===
There was no 2026 recruiting class.

== Preseason ==
On October 7, 2026, the Ivy League released its annual preseason poll. Penn was picked to finish fourth in the conference.

=== Preseason rankings ===
Ivy League Preseason Poll
Place	Team	Votes
1	Princeton	161 (15)
2	Columbia	149 (5)
3	Harvard	131 (1)
4	Penn	104
5	Brown	74
6	Cornell	60
7	Yale	48
8	Dartmouth	29
(#) first-place votes

== Roster ==
2026–27 Penn Quakers women's basketball team
Players
Coaches

Pos.	#	Name	Height	Year	Previous school	Hometown
G	0	Ashna Tambe	5 ft 7 in (1.7 m)	Jr	Hockaday School	Plano, TX
G	2	Brooke Suttle	6 ft 0 in (1.83 m)	Jr	Campbell High School	Atlanta, GA
G	3	Madison Kocis	6 ft 0 in (1.83 m)	Fr	St. John Vianney High School	Chatham, NJ
G	4	Jayah Curtis	5 ft 11 in (1.8 m)	Fr	Morris Catholic High School	Parsippany, NJ
F	5	Ari Paraskevopoulou	6 ft 0 in (1.83 m)	So	16th General HS of Athens	Athens, Greece
C	10	Tina Njike	6 ft 2 in (1.88 m)	Sr	Skyline High School	Salt Lake City, UT
F	11	Ava Jones	6 ft 1 in (1.85 m)	Fr	Hutchison School	Memphis, TN
F	17	Candace Lienafa	5 ft 11 in (1.8 m)	Jr	Davidson	Longueil, Quebec
G	20	Abby Sharpe	6 ft 0 in (1.83 m)	Sr	Plymouth-Whitemarsh High School	Lafayette Hill, PA
C	21	Kate Lipatova	6 ft 3 in (1.91 m)	So	Putnam Science Academy	Moscow, Russia
G	22	Mataya Gayle	5 ft 7 in (1.7 m)	Sr	River Ridge High School	Woodstock, GA
G	23	Ese Ogbevire	5 ft 7 in (1.7 m)	Sr	Fulshear High School	Houston, TX
G	24	Rachel Thatcher	5 ft 8 in (1.73 m)	Fr	Paul VI Catholic High School	Haddon Township, NJ
F	25	Katie Collins	6 ft 1 in (1.85 m)	Jr	Manasquan High School	Manasquan, NJ
G	30	Christina Pham	5 ft 6 in (1.68 m)	So	Noble and Greenough School; Fairfield	Boston, MA
F	33	Gabriella Kelley	6 ft 1 in (1.85 m)	Jr	San Francisco University High School	San Francisco, CA

Head coach

- Mike McLaughlin (Holy Family)

Assistant coach(es)

- Ashley Robinson (Saint Joseph's)
- Liam Shanahan (Pittsburgh)
- Kaity Healy (Seton Hall)

Legend

- (C) Team captain
- (S) Suspended
- (I) Ineligible
- (W) Walk-on
- Injured
- Current redshirt

Roster
Last update: September 14, 2026

== Schedule and results ==
Date time, TV	Rank^{#}	Opponent^{#}	Result	Record	High points	High rebounds	High assists	Site (attendance) city, state
Non-conference regular season
November 3, 2026*; 6:00 p.m., ESPN+		Swarthmore	W 110–27	1–0	14 – Njike	7 – Tied	6 – Collins	The Palestra (123); Philadelphia, PA
November 6, 2026*; 1:00 p.m., ESPN+		Drexel; Big 5 Women's Classic Pod 1	W 71–70	2–0	19 – Njike	9 – Collins	5 – Gayle	The Palestra (451); Philadelphia, PA
November 8, 2026*; 2:00 p.m., MEAC Network		at Norfolk State	W 72–56	3–0	18 – Gayle	5 – Tied	6 – Thatcher	Echols Hall (361); Norfolk, VA
November 12, 2026*; 6:00 p.m., ESPN+		Longwood	W 72–53	4–0	16 – Tied	10 – Thatcher	7 – Collins	The Palestra (299); Philadelphia, PA
November 14, 2026*; 4:00 p.m., ESPN+		No. 23 North Carolina	L 60–71	4–1	22 – Gayle	10 – Suttle	5 – Thatcher	The Palestra (2,714); Philadelphia, PA
November 18, 2026*; 7:00 p.m., ESPN+		at Saint Joseph's; Big 5 Women's Classic Pod 1	W 65–58	5–1	17 – Collins	8 – Njike	6 – Gayle	Michael J. Hagan '85 Arena (979); Philadelphia, PA
November 22, 2026*; 11:30 a.m., ESPN+		at Maine						Memorial Gymnasium; Orono, ME
November 24, 2026*; 5:00 p.m., ESPN+		Hofstra						The Palestra; Philadelphia, PA
November 27, 2026*; 5:00 p.m., FloCollege		at Chapman						Harold Hutton Sports Center; Orange, CA
November 29, 2026*; 5:00 p.m., B1G+		at UCLA						Pauley Pavilion; Los Angeles, CA
December 3, 2026*; 6:00 p.m., MEAC Network		at Maryland Eastern Shore						Hytche Athletic Center; Princess Anne, MD
December 6, 2026*; TBA		TBD; Big 5 Women's Classic						The Palestra; Philadelphia, PA
December 18, 2026*; 11:00 a.m., ESPN+		William & Mary						The Palestra; Philadelphia, PA
December 19, 2026*; 4:00 p.m., ESPN+		Binghamton						The Palestra; Philadelphia, PA
Ivy League regular season
January 5, 2027; 6:00 p.m., ESPN+		at Princeton						Jadwin Gymnasium; Princeton, NJ
January 9, 2027; 2:00 p.m., ESPN+		Brown						The Palestra; Philadelphia, PA
January 16, 2027; 2:00 p.m., ESPN+		at Dartmouth						Leede Arena; Hanover, NH
January 18, 2027; 2:00 p.m., ESPN+		at Harvard						Lavietes Pavilion; Cambridge, MA
January 23, 2027; 2:00 p.m., ESPN+		Yale						The Palestra; Philadelphia, PA
January 29, 2027; 6:00 p.m., ESPN+		at Columbia						Levien Gymnasium; New York, NY
January 30, 2027; TBA, ESPN+		at Cornell						Newman Arena; Ithaca, NY
February 6, 2027; 1:00 p.m., ESPN+		Princeton						The Palestra; Philadelphia, PA
February 12, 2027; 6:00 p.m., ESPN+		Columbia						The Palestra; Philadelphia, PA
February 13, 2027; 4:00 p.m., ESPN+		Cornell						The Palestra; Philadelphia, PA
February 20, 2027; 2:00 p.m., ESPN+		at Yale						John J. Lee Amphitheater; New Haven, CT
February 26, 2027; 6:00 p.m., ESPN+		Dartmouth						The Palestra; Philadelphia, PA
February 27, 2027; 4:00 p.m., ESPN+		Harvard						The Palestra; Philadelphia, PA
March 6, 2027; 1:00 p.m., ESPN+		at Brown						Pizzitola Sports Center; Providence, RI
*Non-conference game. ^{#}Rankings from AP Poll. (#) Tournament seedings in parentheses. All times are in Eastern.
