= Piney Woods (disambiguation) =

The Piney Woods usually refers to a terrestrial ecoregion in the US southern states of Arkansas, Louisiana, Oklahoma, and Texas.

Piney Woods may also refer to:

- Pine forests generally
- A historic ecoregion in the US states of North Carolina, South Carolina, and Georgia, now known as the Sandhills and Inner Banks
- Piney Woods Country Life School in Piney Woods, Mississippi, United States
- Piney Woods, Michigan, an unincorporated community
- Piney Woods, Mississippi, an unincorporated community

Pineywoods may also refer to:

- Pineywoods cattle, endangered breed of landrace heritage cattle
- Pineywoods Guinea
- Pineywoods geranium
- Pineywoods dropseed
- Pineywoods goldenrod

== See also ==
- Pine Belt (Mississippi), a region in southern Mississippi
- Pinewood (disambiguation)
