= 2026–27 Yale Bulldogs women's basketball team =

American college basketball season

2026–27 Yale Bulldogs women's basketball
- Conference: Ivy League
- Record: 4–2 (0–0 Ivy)
- Head coach: Dalila Eshe (5th season)
- Assistant coaches: Jevon Estelle; Keisha Hampton; Anna Kim
- Home arena: John J. Lee Amphitheater

2026–27 Ivy League women's basketball standings
| | Conf. | | | | Overall |
| Team | W | | L | PCT | W | | L | PCT |
|---|---|---|---|---|---|---|---|---|
| Princeton | 0 | – | 0 | – | 5 | – | 1 | .833 |
| Dartmouth | 0 | – | 0 | – | 4 | – | 1 | .800 |
| Penn | 0 | – | 0 | – | 4 | – | 1 | .800 |
| Yale | 0 | – | 0 | – | 4 | – | 1 | .800 |
| Columbia | 0 | – | 0 | – | 3 | – | 2 | .600 |
| Harvard | 0 | – | 0 | – | 3 | – | 2 | .600 |
| Cornell | 0 | – | 0 | – | 2 | – | 2 | .500 |
| Brown | 0 | – | 0 | – | 1 | – | 3 | .250 |
† 2027 Ivy League tournament winner As of November 19, 2026

The 2026–27 Yale Bulldogs women's basketball team currently represents Yale University during the 2026–27 NCAA Division I women's basketball season. The Bulldogs, led by fifth-year head coach Dalila Eshe, play their home games at John J. Lee Amphitheater in New Haven, Connecticut, and compete as a member of the Ivy League.

== Previous season ==
The Bulldogs finished the 2025–26 season 7–20 overall and 3–11 in Ivy League play, finishing seventh in the conference. They failed to qualify for the Ivy League tournament.

== Offseason ==
=== Departures ===
Yale departures
| Name | Number | Pos. | Height | Year | Hometown | Reason for departure |
|---|---|---|---|---|---|---|
| Kiley Capstaw | 21 | Forward | 5' 11" | Senior | West Orange, NJ | Graduated |

=== Incoming transfers ===
Yale incoming transfers
| Name | Number | Pos. | Height | Year | Hometown | Previous school |
|---|---|---|---|---|---|---|
| Cloe Vecina | 31 | Guard | 5' 8" | Junior | Vigo, Spain | Oregon State |

=== Recruiting class ===
There was no 2026 recruiting class.

== Preseason ==
On October 7, 2026, the Ivy League released its annual preseason poll. Yale was picked to finish seventh in the conference.

=== Preseason rankings ===
Ivy League Preseason Poll
| Place | Team | Votes |
|---|---|---|
| 1 | Princeton | 161 (15) |
| 2 | Columbia | 149 (5) |
| 3 | Harvard | 131 (1) |
| 4 | Penn | 104 |
| 5 | Brown | 74 |
| 6 | Cornell | 60 |
| 7 | Yale | 48 |
| 8 | Dartmouth | 29 |
(#) first-place votes

== Roster ==
2026–27 Yale Bulldogs women's basketball team
Players
Coaches

| Pos. | # | Name | Height | Year | Previous school | Hometown |
|---|---|---|---|---|---|---|
| G | 0 | Olivia Kim | 5 ft 8 in (1.73 m) | So | Broomfield High School | Broomfield, CO |
| G | 1 | Ciniya Moore | 5 ft 10 in (1.78 m) | Jr | IMG Academy | Bradenton, FL |
| G | 2 | Lea Vukic | 6 ft 0 in (1.83 m) | Fr | Gimnazija i ekonomska škola Benedikta Kotruljevića | Zagreb, Croatia |
| G | 3 | Hannah Wasserman | 5 ft 11 in (1.8 m) | So | Scarsdale High School | Scarsdale, NY |
| G | 4 | Lucy Lynn (C) | 5 ft 7 in (1.7 m) | Sr | Gonzaga Prep | Liberty Lake, WA |
| G | 5 | Magdalena Schmidt | 5 ft 11 in (1.8 m) | Jr | BG BRG Gmunden and Ballsportgymnasium Wien | Gmunden, Austria |
| G | 9 | Radhika Garapaty | 5 ft 9 in (1.75 m) | So | Notre Dame High School | Milpitas, CA |
| G | 10 | Ke'iara Odume | 5 ft 11 in (1.8 m) | Jr | Loomis Chaffee School | Syracuse, NY |
| F | 11 | Ana Guillen | 6 ft 0 in (1.83 m) | Sr | Sant Andreu de Nazaret; Wisconsin | Badalona, Spain |
| F | 14 | Kasey Davey | 6 ft 0 in (1.83 m) | Fr | Providence School of Jacksonville | Atlantic Beach, FL |
| F | 17 | Luisa Vydrova | 6 ft 1 in (1.85 m) | Sr | Gymnazium Nad Stolou; UTEP | Prague, Czechia |
| G | 18 | Helena Keane | 6 ft 0 in (1.83 m) | Fr | Muckross Park College | Dublin, Ireland |
| F | 20 | Mary Meng | 6 ft 5 in (1.96 m) | Sr | Midview High School; Michigan State | Grafton, OH |
| G | 21 | Maddie Smith | 5 ft 9 in (1.75 m) | Fr | Flintridge Preparatory School | Arcadia, FL |
| G | 22 | Marisa Chapman | 5 ft 9 in (1.75 m) | Jr | Storm King School | Middletown, NY |
| G | 30 | Katie Diao | 5 ft 9 in (1.75 m) | Fr | Richard Montgomery High School | Rockville, MD |
| G | 31 | Cloe Vecina | 5 ft 8 in (1.73 m) | Jr | IES Alexandre Bóveda; Oregon State | Vigo, Spain |
| F | 32 | Dorka Kastl | 6 ft 2 in (1.88 m) | So | Holderness School | Budapest, Hungary |
| F | 33 | Sophia Gibson | 6 ft 4 in (1.93 m) | So | Notre Dame Academy | Taylor Mill, KY |

Head coach

- Dalila Eshe (Florida)

Assistant coach(es)

- Jevon Estelle (Grand Canyon)
- Keisha Hampton (DePaul)
- Anna Kim (Long Beach State)

Legend

- (C) Team captain
- (S) Suspended
- (I) Ineligible
- (W) Walk-on
- Injured
- Current redshirt

Roster
Last update: September 14, 2026

== Schedule and results ==
| Date time, TV | Rank^{#} | Opponent^{#} | Result | Record | High points | High rebounds | High assists | Site (attendance) city, state |
Non-conference regular season
| November 2, 2026*; 4:30 p.m., ESPN+ | | Elms | W 111–38 | 1–0 | 23 – Keane | 13 – Vukic | 3 – Tied | John J. Lee Amphitheater (277); New Haven, CT |
| November 6, 2026*; 6:00 p.m., ESPN+ | | Saint Francis (PA) | W 106–24 | 2–0 | 15 – Moore | 11 – Gibson | 5 – Tied | John J. Lee Amphitheater (205); New Haven, CT |
| November 10, 2026*; 7:00 p.m., ESPN+ | | at Loyola Maryland | W 71–67 ^{OT} | 3–0 | 13 – Vukic | 8 – Chapman | 6 – Kastl | Reitz Arena (245); Baltimore, MD |
| November 14, 2026*; 11:00 a.m., ESPN+ | | Rider | W 65–47 | 4–0 | 19 – Vukic | 11 – Kastl | 4 – Tied | John J. Lee Amphitheater (79); New Haven, CT |
| November 16, 2026*; 6:30 p.m., ESPN+ | | at Quinnipiac | L 53–59 | 4–1 | 19 – Moore | 8 – Vukic | 6 – Vecina | M&T Bank Arena (284); Hamden, CT |
| November 18, 2026*; 4:30 p.m., ESPN+ | | New Hampshire | L 58–64 | 4–2 | 16 – Tied | 8 – Chapman | 5 – Vecina | John J. Lee Amphitheater (171); New Haven, CT |
| November 24, 2026*; 11:00 a.m., ESPN+ | | American | | | | | | John J. Lee Amphitheater; New Haven, CT |
| November 28, 2026*; 7:00 p.m. | | at Marist | | | | | | McCann Arena; Poughkeepsie, NY |
| November 30, 2026*; 5:00 p.m., ESPN+ | | Western Connecticut | | | | | | John J. Lee Amphitheater; New Haven, CT |
| December 4, 2026*; 9:00 p.m. | | at Gonzaga | | | | | | McCarthey Athletic Center; Spokane, WA |
| December 6, 2026*; 12:00 p.m. | | at Akron | | | | | | James A. Rhodes Arena; Akron, OH |
| December 9, 2026*; 4:30 p.m., ESPN+ | | Saint Peter's | | | | | | John J. Lee Amphitheater; New Haven, CT |
| December 12, 2026*; 1:00 p.m. | | at Northeastern | | | | | | Cabot Center; Boston, MA |
| December 19, 2026*; 2:00 p.m., ESPN+ | | Western Kentucky | | | | | | John J. Lee Amphitheater; New Haven, CT |
| December 30, 2026*; 5:00 p.m., ESPN+ | | New Haven | | | | | | John J. Lee Amphitheater; New Haven, CT |
Ivy League regular season
| January 4, 2027; 7:00 p.m., ESPN+ | | at Brown | | | | | | Pizzitola Sports Center; Providence, RI |
| January 9, 2027; 2:00 p.m., ESPN+ | | at Princeton | | | | | | Jadwin Gymnasium; Princeton, NJ |
| January 16, 2027; 2:00 p.m., ESPN+ | | Cornell | | | | | | John J. Lee Amphitheater; New Haven, CT |
| January 18, 2027; 2:00 p.m., ESPN+ | | Columbia | | | | | | John J. Lee Amphitheater; New Haven, CT |
| January 23, 2027; 2:00 p.m., ESPN+ | | at Penn | | | | | | The Palestra; Philadelphia, PA |
| January 29, 2027; 7:00 p.m., ESPN+ | | Dartmouth | | | | | | John J. Lee Amphitheater; New Haven, CT |
| January 30, 2027; 5:00 p.m., ESPN+ | | Harvard | | | | | | John J. Lee Amphitheater; New Haven, CT |
| February 6, 2027; 2:00 p.m., ESPN+ | | Brown | | | | | | John J. Lee Amphitheater; New Haven, CT |
| February 12, 2027; 6:00 p.m., ESPN+ | | at Dartmouth | | | | | | Leede Arena; Hanover, NH |
| February 13, 2027; 6:00 p.m., ESPN+ | | at Harvard | | | | | | Lavietes Pavilion; Cambridge, MA |
| February 20, 2027; 2:00 p.m., ESPN+ | | Brown | | | | | | John J. Lee Amphitheater; New Haven, CT |
| February 26, 2027; TBA, ESPN+ | | at Cornell | | | | | | Newman Arena; Ithaca, NY |
| February 27, 2027; TBA, ESPN+ | | at Columbia | | | | | | Levien Gymnasium; New York, NY |
| March 6, 2027; 2:00 p.m., ESPN+ | | Princeton | | | | | | John J. Lee Amphitheater; New Haven, CT |
*Non-conference game. ^{#}Rankings from AP poll. (#) Tournament seedings in parentheses. All times are in Eastern.
