= Brown Bears women's basketball =

Brown University sports team

2026–27 Brown Bears women's basketball team
- University: Brown University
- First season: 1973; 53 years ago
- Head coach: Monique LeBlanc (5th season)
- Location: Providence, Rhode Island
- Arena: Pizzitola Sports Center (capacity: 2,800)
- Conference: Ivy League
- Nickname: Bears
- Colors: Seal brown, cardinal red, and white
- Student section: The Brown Bear's Den

NCAA Division I tournament appearances
- 1994

Conference regular-season champions
- 1984, 1985, 1992, 1993, 1994, 2006

Uniforms
Home	Away

The Brown Bears women's basketball team is the intercollegiate women's basketball program representing Brown University. The school competes in the Ivy League in Division I of the National Collegiate Athletic Association (NCAA). The Bears play home basketball games at the Pizzitola Sports Center in Providence, Rhode Island on the university campus.

== History ==
Brown has won 6 Ivy League championships, three of them outright (1984, 1992, 1993) and three shared (1985, 1994, 2006). Twice they have played in a playoff (the league did not have a conference tournament until 2017) to determine the Ivy League bid for the NCAA Tournament, winning 72–62 win over Dartmouth in 1994 and losing 73–62 in 2006 to Dartmouth.

Season	Record	Conference Record	Coach
1973–74	11–1	n/a	Gail Davis
1974–75	16–4	3–2 (2nd)	Gail Davis
1975–76	13–7	2–1 (2nd)	Carole Kleinfelder
1976–77	7–11	1–2 (4th)	Gail Klock
1977–78	9–13	2–2 (5th)	Gail Klock
1978–79	7–13	1–2 (6th)	Gail Klock
1979–80	12–13	5–5 (6th)	Gail Klock
1980–81	8–17	4–6 (6th)	Maureen Enos
1981–82	9–15	4–5 (4th)	Maureen Enos
1982–83	12–12	7–5 (4th)	Maureen Enos
1983–84	16–8	10–2 (1st)	Maureen Enos
1984–85	15–11	9–3 (1st)	Maureen Enos
1985–86	12–14	5–7 (5th)	Maureen Enos
1986–87	9–15	6–8 (5th)	Maureen Enos
1987–88	6–20	5–9 (5th)	Maureen Enos
1988–89	16–10	9–5 (3rd)	Jean Marie Burr
1989–90	16–10	9–5 (2nd)	Jean Marie Burr
1990–91	19–7	10–4 (2nd)	Jean Marie Burr
1991–92	22–4	13–1 (1st)	Jean Marie Burr
1992–93	19–7	13–1 (1st)	Jean Marie Burr
1993–94	18–10	11–3 (1st)	Jean Marie Burr
1994–95	12–14	8–6 (3rd)	Jean Marie Burr
1995–96	10–16	7–7 (5th)	Jean Marie Burr
1996–97	15–11	10–4 (2nd)	Jean Marie Burr
1997–98	11–15	7–7 (6th)	Jean Marie Burr
1998–99	12–14	7–7 (4th)	Jean Marie Burr
1999-00	9–19	4–10 (7th)	Jean Marie Burr
2000–01	10–17	5–9 (6th)	Jean Marie Burr
2001–02	5–22	2–12 (8th)	Jean Marie Burr
2002–03	15–12	9–5 (T-2nd)	Jean Marie Burr
2003–04	16–11	9–5 (T-2nd)	Jean Marie Burr
2004–05	18–9	10–4 (3rd)	Jean Marie Burr
2005–06	18–10	12–2 (T-1st)	Jean Marie Burr
2006–07	5–23	3–11 (8th)	Jean Marie Burr
2007–08	2–26	1–13 (8th)	Jean Marie Burr
2008–09	3–25	1–13 (8th)	Jean Marie Burr
2009–10	8–20	5–9 (6th)	Jean Marie Burr
2010–11	10–18	6–8 (4th)	Jean Marie Burr
2011–12	16–12	7–7 (4th)	Jean Marie Burr
2012–13	9–19	3–11 (7th)	Jean Marie Burr
2013–14	10–18	4–10 (6th)	Jean Marie Burr
2014–15	10–18	4–10 (7th)	Sarah Behn
2015–16	15–13	3–11 (7th)	Sarah Behn
2016–17	17–13	7–7 (T-4th)	Sarah Behn

== Postseason appearances ==
The Bears have made the NCAA Division I women's basketball tournament once. They have a record of 0–1.

Year	Seed	Round	Opponent	Result
1994	16	First Round	(1) Connecticut	L 60–79
