= 2026–27 Harvard Crimson women's basketball team =

American college basketball season

2026–27 Harvard Crimson women's basketball
- Conference: Ivy League
- Record: 4–2 (0–0 Ivy)
- Head coach: Carrie Moore (5th season)
- Assistant coaches: Ali Sanders; Steve Harney; Ariel Gaston
- Home arena: Lavietes Pavilion

2026–27 Ivy League women's basketball standings
	Conf.				Overall
Team	W		L	PCT	W		L	PCT
Princeton	0	–	0	–	5	–	1	.833
Dartmouth	0	–	0	–	4	–	1	.800
Penn	0	–	0	–	4	–	1	.800
Yale	0	–	0	–	4	–	1	.800
Columbia	0	–	0	–	3	–	2	.600
Harvard	0	–	0	–	3	–	2	.600
Cornell	0	–	0	–	2	–	2	.500
Brown	0	–	0	–	1	–	3	.250
† 2027 Ivy League tournament winner As of November 19, 2026

The 2026–27 Harvard Crimson women's basketball team currently represents Harvard University during the 2026–27 NCAA Division I women's basketball season. The Crimson, led by fifth-year head coach Carrie Moore, play their home games at the Lavietes Pavilion in Cambridge, Massachusetts and compete as a member of the Ivy League.

== Previous season ==
The Crimson finished the 2025–26 season 20–12 overall and 10–4 in Ivy League play, finishing third in the conference for the second consecutive season. As the No. 3 seed and defending champions in the Ivy League tournament, they defeated No. 2 Columbia 67–65 in overtime to once again advance to the championship game. They could not defend their title, as they fell to top-seeded Princeton 53–63.

Following their Ivy Madness run, the Crimson earned an at-large bid to the WBIT, their first appearance in the tournament since its creation. They were seeded No. 4 in the Utah Bracket. They defeated unseeded Navy and Eastern Kentucky 73–52 and 63–34 in the first and second rounds respectively. Their run would end in the quarterfinals, as they lost 61–64 in overtime to No. 3 seeded Wisconsin to end their season.

== Offseason ==
=== Departures ===
Harvard departures
Name	Number	Pos.	Height	Year	Hometown	Reason for departure
Gabby Anderson	5	Guard	5'11"	Senior	Columbus, OH	Graduated
Saniyah Glenn-Bello	22	Guard	6'0"	Senior	Staten Island, NY	Graduated, transferred to Vanderbilt (Note: Glenn-Bello is currently eligible, pending litigation, to play a final year in the 2026–27 season following a preliminary injunction granted in Glancey v. NCAA, an August lawsuit challenging the NCAA’s age-based eligibility model, which excluded the class of 2022.)
Katie Krupa	31	Forward	6'1"	Senior	Morton, IL	Graduated

=== Incoming transfers ===
There were no incoming transfers for the 2026–27 season.

=== Recruiting class ===
There was no 2026 recruiting class.

== Preseason ==
On October 7, 2026, the Ivy League released its annual preseason poll. Harvard was picked to finish third in the conference, with one first place vote.

=== Preseason rankings ===
Ivy League Preseason Poll
Place	Team	Votes
1	Princeton	161 (15)
2	Columbia	149 (5)
3	Harvard	131 (1)
4	Penn	104
5	Brown	74
6	Cornell	60
7	Yale	48
8	Dartmouth	29
(#) first-place votes

== Roster ==
2026–27 Harvard Crimson women's basketball team
Players
Coaches

Pos.	#	Name	Height	Year	Previous school	Hometown
G	0	Olivia Jones	5 ft 10 in (1.78 m)	So	Westtown School	Harrisburg, PA
G	1	Aubrey Shaw	6 ft 2 in (1.88 m)	So	Blue Valley North High School	Overland Park, KS
F	3	Asani Ceaser	6 ft 0 in (1.83 m)	Jr	Centennial High School	Las Vegas, NV
G	6	Lydia Chatira	6 ft 0 in (1.83 m)	Jr	ACS Athens	Pikermi, Greece
G	7	Sierra Woolhouse	5 ft 11 in (1.8 m)	Fr	St. Leonard's College	Hampton, Australia
G	10	Adyra Rajan	5 ft 9 in (1.75 m)	Fr	Fairmont Preparatory Academy	Cerritos, CA
G	11	Alayna Rocco	5 ft 10 in (1.78 m)	Jr	North Catholic High School	Pittsburgh, PA
G	12	Karlee White (C)	5 ft 9 in (1.75 m)	Sr	Oak Park High School	Burbank, CA
F	13	Hana Belibi	5 ft 0 in (1.52 m)	Jr	Regis Jesuit High School	Englewood, CO
F/C	15	Maya Nahar	6 ft 4 in (1.93 m)	So	Western Reserve Academy	Paramaribo, Suriname
F	20	Sophie Smith	6 ft 2 in (1.88 m)	Fr	Red Bank Catholic High School	Little Silver, NJ
G/F	21	Ava Krumwiede	6 ft 1 in (1.85 m)	So	Harpeth Hall	Nashville, TN
G	23	Nina Emnace	5 ft 7 in (1.7 m)	Jr	Trinity Hall	Toms River, NJ
F	24	Mary Hollensteiner (C)	6 ft 1 in (1.85 m)	Sr	Stone Ridge School of the Sacred Heart	Bethesda, MD
G/F	25	Sam Wills	6 ft 0 in (1.83 m)	So	Visitation High School	Mendota Heights, MN
G/F	40	Abigail Wright (C)	6 ft 1 in (1.85 m)	Sr	Newton North High School	Newton, MA

Head coach

- Carrie Moore (Western Michigan)

Assistant coach(es)

- Ali Sanders (Southeastern)
- Steve Harney (Dickinson)
- Ariel Gaston (New Hampshire)

Legend

- (C) Team captain
- (S) Suspended
- (I) Ineligible
- (W) Walk-on
- Injured
- Current redshirt

Roster
Last update: September 14, 2026

== Schedule and results ==
Date time, TV	Rank^{#}	Opponent^{#}	Result	Record	High points	High rebounds	High assists	Site (attendance) city, state
Non-conference regular season
November 2, 2026*; 6:00 p.m., B1G+		at No. 17 Minnesota	L 62–82	0–1	20 – Wills	7 – Wright	5 – White	The Barn (7,185); Minneapolis, MN
November 5, 2026*; 7:00 p.m., ESPN+		Boston College	W 81–51	1–1	25 – White	6 – Tied	4 – Tied	Lavietes Pavilion (748); Cambridge, MA
November 9, 2026*; 6:00 p.m., ESPN+		at Holy Cross	W 63–42	2–1	17 – Chatira	10 – Jones	3 – Tied	Hart Center (640); Worcester, MA
November 11, 2026*; 7:00 p.m., ESPN+		UMass	W 78–65	3–1	22 – Wright	10 – Jones	5 – Tied	Lavietes Pavilion (521); Cambridge, MA
November 15, 2026*; 2:00 p.m., ESPN+		Michigan State	L 53–75	3–2	19 – White	8 – Jones	4 – Jones	Lavietes Pavilion (860); Cambridge, MA
November 18, 2026*; 5:00 p.m., ESPN+		Syracuse	W 79–67	4–2	30 – White	9 – Jones	9 – Wright	Lavietes Pavilion (569); Cambridge, MA
November 20, 2026*; 8:30 p.m., YouTube		at Colorado State						Moby Arena; Fort Collins, CO
November 22, 2026*; 4:00 p.m., MW+		at Wyoming						Arena-Auditorium; Laramie, WY
November 25, 2026*; 12:00 p.m.		Illinois State						Lavietes Pavilion; Cambridge, MA
November 28, 2026*; TBA, ACCNX		vs. Pittsburgh; Christmas City Classic opening round						Stabler Arena; Bethlehem, PA
November 29, 2026*; 12:00 p.m. or 2:30 p.m.		vs. Liberty or Lehigh; Christmas City Classic						Stabler Arena; Bethlehem, PA
December 4, 2026*; 7:00 p.m., ESPN+		at West Virginia						Hope Coliseum; Morgantown, WV
December 6, 2026*; 1:00 p.m., ESPN+		at Marshall						Cam Henderson Center; Huntington, WV
December 20, 2026*; 12:00 p.m., ESPN+		UC Davis						Lavietes Pavilion; Cambridge, MA
December 28, 2026*; 9:00 p.m., ESPN+		at Texas						Moody Center; Austin, TX
Ivy League regular season
January 2, 2027; 2:00 p.m., ESPN+		Dartmouth						Lavietes Pavilion; Cambridge, MA
January 9, 2027; TBA		at Columbia						Levien Gymnasium; New York, NY
January 16, 2027; 2:00 p.m., ESPN+		Princeton						Lavietes Pavilion; Cambridge, MA
January 18, 2027; 2:00 p.m., ESPN+		Penn						Lavietes Pavilion; Cambridge, MA
January 23, 2027; 4:00 p.m., ESPN+		Cornell						Lavietes Pavilion; Cambridge, MA
January 29, 2027; 7:00 p.m., ESPN+		at Brown						Pizzitola Sports Center; Providence, RI
January 30, 2027; 5:00 p.m., ESPN+		at Yale						John J. Lee Amphitheater; New Haven, CT
February 6, 2027; 2:00 p.m., ESPN+		at Dartmouth						Leede Arena; Hanover, NH
February 12, 2027; 7:00 p.m., ESPN+		Brown						Lavietes Pavilion; Cambridge, MA
February 13, 2027; 6:00 p.m., ESPN+		Yale						Lavietes Pavilion; Cambridge, MA
February 20, 2027; TBA		at Cornell						Newman Arena; Ithaca, NY
February 26, 2027; 7:00 p.m., ESPN+		at Princeton						Jadwin Gymnasium; Princeton, NJ
February 27, 2027; 4:00 p.m., NBCSP & ESPN+		at Penn						The Palestra; Philadelphia, PA
March 6, 2027; 2:00 p.m., ESPN+		Columbia						Lavietes Pavilion; Cambridge, MA
*Non-conference game. ^{#}Rankings from AP Poll. (#) Tournament seedings in parentheses. All times are in Eastern.
