= 2026–27 Cornell Big Red women's basketball team =

American college basketball season

2026–27 Cornell Big Red women's basketball
- Conference: Ivy League
- Record: 0–1 (0–0 Ivy)
- Head coach: Emily Garner (3rd season)
- Associate head coach: Courtnay Pilypaitis
- Assistant coaches: Amber Easter; Vanese Barnes
- Home arena: Newman Arena

2026–27 Ivy League women's basketball standings
	Conf.				Overall
Team	W		L	PCT	W		L	PCT
Brown	0	–	0	–	0	–	0	–
Columbia	0	–	0	–	0	–	0	–
Cornell	0	–	0	–	0	–	0	–
Dartmouth	0	–	0	–	0	–	0	–
Harvard	0	–	0	–	0	–	0	–
Penn	0	–	0	–	0	–	0	–
Princeton	0	–	0	–	0	–	0	–
Yale	0	–	0	–	0	–	0	–
† 2027 Ivy League tournament winner

The 2026–27 Cornell Big Red women's basketball team currently represents Cornell University during the 2026–27 NCAA Division I women's basketball season. The Big Red, led by third-year head coach Emily Garner, play their home games at Newman Arena in Ithaca, New York, and compete as a member of the Ivy League.

== Previous season ==
The Big Red finished the 2025–26 season 9–18 overall and 4–10 in Ivy League play, finishing sixth in the conference. They failed to qualify for the Ivy League tournament.

== Offseason ==
=== Departures ===
Cornell departures
Name	Number	Pos.	Height	Year	Hometown	Reason for departure
Azareya Kilgoe	0	Guard	5'4"	Junior	Seaford, DE	TBD; removed from roster in late 2025
Vivienne Knee	3	Guard/Forward	5'9"	Senior	New York, NY	Graduated
Emily Pape	32	Forward	6'1"	Senior	Park Ridge, IL	Graduated, transferred to Newcastle (England)

=== Incoming transfers ===
There were no incoming transfers for the 2026–27 season.

=== Recruiting class ===
There was no 2026 recruiting class.

== Preseason ==
On October 7, 2026, the Ivy League released its annual preseason poll. Cornell was picked to finish sixth in the conference.

=== Preseason rankings ===
Ivy League Preseason Poll
Place	Team	Votes
1	Princeton	161 (15)
2	Columbia	149 (5)
3	Harvard	131 (1)
4	Penn	104
5	Brown	74
6	Cornell	60
7	Yale	48
8	Dartmouth	29
(#) first-place votes

== Roster ==
2026–27 Cornell Big Red women's basketball team
Players
Coaches

Pos.	#	Name	Height	Year	Previous school	Hometown
G	0	Trinity Jones	5 ft 7 in (1.7 m)	So	Desert Vista High School	Phoenix, AZ
G/F	1	Alana Andrews	6 ft 2 in (1.88 m)	Jr	Grace Church School	New York, NY
G/F	3	Rhylin Fehrenbach	5 ft 11 in (1.8 m)	Fr	Long Island Lutheran High School	Rochester, NY
G/F	5	Rachel Kaus	6 ft 0 in (1.83 m)	Sr	Lake Forest High School	Lake Bluff, IL
F	10	Audrey Childers	6 ft 3 in (1.91 m)	So	Los Gatos High School	Los Gatos, CA
F	11	Grace Renners	6 ft 1 in (1.85 m)	So	Seattle Prep	Bellevue, WA
F	13	Emma O'Brien	6 ft 1 in (1.85 m)	Fr	Lyons Township High School	LaGrange, IL
G	14	Katie Leonard	5 ft 11 in (1.8 m)	Fr	Seaforth High School	Moncure, NC
G	15	Simone Richmond	5 ft 6 in (1.68 m)	Fr	Allen High School	Allen, TX
G	20	Willa Chinn	5 ft 10 in (1.78 m)	So	Lakeside School	Seattle, WA
G	21	Kelsey Langston	5 ft 7 in (1.7 m)	Jr	Loyola Academy	Wilmette, IL
G	22	Clarke Jackson	5 ft 9 in (1.75 m)	Sr	Gahanna-Lincoln High School	Columbus, OH
F	24	Brooke Nunally-Gardner	6 ft 0 in (1.83 m)	Fr	Dexter Southfield School	Stoughton, MA
G/F	25	Ally Pape	5 ft 11 in (1.8 m)	So	Maine South High School	Park Ridge, IL
G	32	Audrey Chen	5 ft 7 in (1.7 m)	Jr	La Salle College Prep	South Pasadena, CA
G	33	Paige Engels	5 ft 8 in (1.73 m)	Jr	Loyola Academy	Golf, IL

Head coach

- Emily Garner (Lafayette)

Assistant coach(es)

- Courtnay Pilypaitis (Vermont)
- Amber Easter (George Mason)
- Vanese Barnes (Saint Joseph's (ME))

Legend

- (C) Team captain
- (S) Suspended
- (I) Ineligible
- (W) Walk-on
- Injured
- Current redshirt

Roster
Last update: September 14, 2026

== Schedule and results ==
Date time, TV	Rank^{#}	Opponent^{#}	Result	Record	High points	High rebounds	High assists	Site (attendance) city, state
Regular season
November 2, 2026*; 5:00 p.m., Peacock/NBCSN		at No. 2 UConn	L 35–100	0–1	8 – Kaus	4 – Richmond	3 – Langston	PeoplesBank Arena (10,409); Hartford, CT
November 5, 2026*; TBA, ESPN+		Fredonia						Newman Arena; Ithaca, NY
November 8, 2026*; TBA, ESPN+		at Syracuse						JMA Wireless Dome; Syracuse, NY
November 13, 2026*; 5:00 p.m., ESPN+		Canisius						Newman Arena; Ithaca, NY
November 18, 2026*; 6:00 p.m., ESPN+		Mercyhurst						Newman Arena; Ithaca, NY
November 21, 2026*; TBA, ESPN+		at Albany						Broadview Center; Albany, NY
November 24, 2026*; 6:00 p.m., ESPN+		Wagner						Newman Arena; Ithaca, NY
November 28, 2026*; TBA, ESPN+		at Loyola Maryland						Reitz Arena; Baltimore, MD
November 30, 2026*; TBA, ESPN+		at Siena						UHY Center; Loudonville, NY
December 2, 2026*; TBA, ESPN+		at Niagara						Gallagher Center; Lewiston, NY
December 6, 2026*; 2:00 p.m., ESPN+		Le Moyne						Newman Arena; Ithaca, NY
December 8, 2026*; 11:00 a.m., ESPN+		St. Bonaventure						Newman Arena; Ithaca, NY
December 20, 2026*; TBA		at Monmouth						OceanFirst Bank Center; West Long Branch, NJ
December 29, 2026*; TBA		at Buffalo						Broadview Arena; Buffalo, NY
January 3, 2027; 1:00 p.m., ESPN+		Columbia						Newman Arena; Ithaca, NY
January 4, 2027*; 3:00 p.m., ESPN+		New Paltz						Newman Arena; Ithaca, NY
January 9, 2027; 2:00 p.m., ESPN+		Dartmouth						Newman Arena; Ithaca, NY
January 16, 2027; TBA, ESPN+		at Yale						John J. Lee Amphitheater; New Haven, CT
January 18, 2027; TBA, ESPN+		at Brown						Pizzitola Sports Center; Providence, RI
January 23, 2027; TBA, ESPN+		at Harvard						Lavietes Pavilion; Cambridge, MA
January 29, 2027; TBA, ESPN+		Princeton						Newman Arena; Ithaca, NY
January 30, 2027; TBA, ESPN+		Penn						Newman Arena; Ithaca, NY
February 6, 2027; TBA		at Columbia						Levien Gymnasium; New York, NY
February 12, 2027; TBA		at Princeton						Jadwin Gymnasium; Princeton, NJ
February 13, 2027; TBA		at Penn						The Palestra; Philadelphia, PA
February 20, 2027; TBA, ESPN+		Harvard						Newman Arena; Ithaca, NY
February 26, 2027; TBA, ESPN+		Yale						Newman Arena; Ithaca, NY
February 27, 2027; TBA, ESPN+		Brown						Newman Arena; Ithaca, NY
March 6, 2027; TBA, ESPN+		at Dartmouth						Leede Arena; Hanover, NH
*Non-conference game. ^{#}Rankings from AP Poll. (#) Tournament seedings in parentheses. All times are in Eastern.
