= 2026–27 Syracuse Orange women's basketball team =

Intercollegiate basketball season

2026–27 Syracuse Orange women's basketball
- Conference: Atlantic Coast Conference
- Record: 4–1 (0–0 ACC)
- Head coach: Felisha Legette-Jack (5th season)
- Associate head coach: Natasha Adair
- Assistant coaches: Khyreed Carter; Caleb Samson
- Home arena: JMA Wireless Dome

2026–27 ACC women's basketball standings
	Conf.				Overall
Team	W		L	PCT	W		L	PCT
No. 3 Louisville	0	–	0	–	7	–	0	1.000
California	0	–	0	–	5	–	0	1.000
Florida State	0	–	0	–	5	–	0	1.000
Miami (FL)	0	–	0	–	5	–	0	1.000
Virginia	0	–	0	–	5	–	0	1.000
Virginia Tech	0	–	0	–	5	–	0	1.000
No. 5 Duke	0	–	0	–	4	–	0	1.000
No. 13 Notre Dame	0	–	0	–	4	–	0	1.000
Pittsburgh	0	–	0	–	4	–	0	1.000
Syracuse	0	–	0	–	4	–	0	1.000
SMU	0	–	0	–	5	–	1	.833
Clemson	0	–	0	–	4	–	1	.800
Georgia Tech	0	–	0	–	4	–	1	.800
NC State	0	–	0	–	4	–	1	.800
Stanford	0	–	0	–	4	–	1	.800
Wake Forest	0	–	0	–	4	–	1	.800
Boston College	0	–	0	–	3	–	2	.600
No. 24 North Carolina	0	–	0	–	2	–	2	.500
† 2027 ACC tournament winner As of November 19, 2026; Rankings from AP Poll

The 2026–27 Syracuse Orange women's basketball team currently represents Syracuse University during the 2026–27 NCAA Division I women's basketball season. The Orange, led by fifth-year head coach Felisha Legette-Jack, play their home games at the JMA Wireless Dome in Syracuse, New York and compete as a member of the Atlantic Coast Conference.

== Previous season ==
The Orange finished the 2025–26 season 24–9 overall and 12–6 in ACC play, to finish in a three-way tie for fifth place in the conference with Notre Dame and Virginia Tech. As the No. 7 seed in the ACC tournament, they earned a bye to the second round, where they defeated No. 10 California. They then fell to No. 2 Louisville in the semifinals.

Following their ACC tournament elimination, the Orange received an at-large bid to the NCAA tournament, where they were seeded No. 8 in the Fort Worth #1 Regional. In the first round, they defeated No. 8 Iowa State 70–58 to move on to the second round. However, they could not go on to the Sweet Sixteen, as they fell to top-seeded and undefeated UConn 45–98 to end their season. The 53-point loss to the Huskies was the team's worst NCAA tournament loss in program history.

== Offseason ==
=== Departures ===
Syracuse departures
Name	Number	Pos.	Height	Year	Hometown	Reason for departure
Aurora Almón	0	Forward	6'4"	Sophomore	Santo Domingo, Dominican Republic	Transferred to Florida
Journey Thompson	2	Forward	6'3"	Senior	McMurray, PA	Graduated
Sophie Burrows	4	Guard	6'2"	Junior	Lower Plenty, Australia	Transferred to North Carolina
Laila Phelia	5	Guard	6'0"	Senior	Cincinnati, OH	Graduated; went unselected in the 2026 WNBA draft, signed a training camp contract with the Atlanta Dream
Camdyn Nelson	13	Guard	5'8"	Freshman	Greenwich, CT	Transferred to Northwestern
Madeline Potts	17	Guard	6'0"	Sophomore	Doncaster, Australia	Transferred to Saint Joseph's
Dominique Darius	20	Guard	5'10"	Graduate Student	Jacksonville, FL	Exhausted eligibility (Note: Darius was denied a waiver for an additional year of eligibility by the NCAA on September 9.)
Justus Fitzgerald	22	Forward	6'1"	Freshman	Roswell, GA	Transferred to Hampton
Oyindamola Akinbolawa	25	Center	6'5"	Senior	Lagos, Nigeria	Graduated
Jasmyn Cooper	30	Forward	6'1"	Freshman	North Easton, MA	Transferred to Northwestern

=== Incoming transfers ===
Syracuse incoming transfers
Name	Number	Pos.	Height	Year	Hometown	Previous school
Tyi Skinner	0	Guard	5'5"	5th year	Washington, D.C.	SMU
Jaleesa Molina	8	Forward	6'3"	Senior	The Hague, Netherlands	Temple
Emely Rodriguez	21	Guard	6'0"	Junior	La Romana, Dominican Republic	Iowa
Sarah Rambus	23	Forward	6'3"	Senior	Flint, MI	Oregon

=== Recruiting class ===
There was no 2026 recruiting class.

== Roster ==
2026–27 Syracuse Orange women's basketball team
Players
Coaches

Pos.	#	Name	Height	Year	Previous school	Hometown
G	0	Tyi Skinner (5th)	5 ft 5 in (1.65 m)	Sr	TPLS Christian Academy; SMU	Washington, D.C.
F	1	Keira Scott (C)	6 ft 1 in (1.85 m)	Jr	DME Academy	Falls Church, VA
G	3	Olivia Schmitt (C)	5 ft 5 in (1.65 m)	Jr	DME Academy	Staten Island, NY
G	4	Madison Howard	5 ft 8 in (1.73 m)	Fr	Monsignor Scanlan High School	The Bronx, NY
G	5	Angelica Velez (C)	5 ft 7 in (1.7 m)	Sr	The Webb School; LSU	The Bronx, NY
G	6	Elif Çayir	5 ft 10 in (1.78 m)	Fr		Ankara, Turkey
F	8	Jaleesa Molina	6 ft 3 in (1.91 m)	Sr	Temple	The Hague, Netherlands
F	9	Célaine Ricco	5 ft 8 in (1.73 m)	Fr		Melun, France
F	10	Destiny Robinson	6 ft 0 in (1.83 m)	Fr	St. Mary's High School	Queens, NY
G/F	14	Shy Hawkins	6 ft 2 in (1.88 m)	Jr	William Floyd High School	Mastic Beach, NY
G	21	Emely Rodriguez	6 ft 0 in (1.83 m)	Jr	Central Pointe Christian Academy; Iowa	La Romana, Dominican Republic
F	23	Sarah Rambus	6 ft 3 in (1.91 m)	Sr	IMG Academy; Oregon	Flint, MI
C	44	Uche Izoje	6 ft 3 in (1.91 m)	So		Asaba, Nigeria

Head coach

- Felisha Legette-Jack (Syracuse)

Assistant coach(es)

- Natasha Adair (South Florida)
- Khyreed Carter (Michigan State)
- Caleb Samson (Illinois)

Legend

- (C) Team captain
- (S) Suspended
- (I) Ineligible
- (W) Walk-on
- (5th) Fifth year senior
- Injured
- Current redshirt

Roster
Last update: August 14, 2026

== Schedule and results ==
Date time, TV	Rank^{#}	Opponent^{#}	Result	Record	High points	High rebounds	High assists	Site (attendance) city, state
Exhibition
October 12, 2026*; 6:30 p.m., NBCSN/UConn+		vs. UConn; Rivalry	L 60–88		14 – Rodriguez	8 – Izoje	2 – Tied	Mohegan Sun Arena (5,012); Uncasville, CT
Regular season
November 3, 2026*; 6:00 p.m., ACCNX		Sacred Heart	W 75–48	1–0	16 – Izoje	14 – Izoje	5 – Skinner	JMA Wireless Dome (2,695); Syracuse, NY
November 8, 2026*; 2:00 p.m., ACCNX		Cornell	W 80–48	2–0	22 – Izoje	8 – Izoje	3 – Tied	JMA Wireless Dome (2,704); Syracuse, NY
November 11, 2026*; 6:00 p.m., ACCNX		Siena	W 82–58	3–0	22 – Izoje	10 – Izoje	3 – Tied	JMA Wireless Dome (2,713); Syracuse, NY
November 15, 2026*; 7:00 p.m., ACCN		Canisius	W 82–68	4–0	23 – Izoje	9 – Izoje	4 – Skinner	JMA Wireless Dome (2,619); Syracuse, NY
November 18, 2026*; 5:00 p.m., NESN+/ESPN+		at Harvard	L 67–79	4–1	23 – Izoje	10 – Izoje	3 – Tied	Lavietes Pavilion (569); Cambridge, MA
November 25, 2026*; 11:00 a.m.		vs. Southern; Discover Puerto Rico Shootout						Coliseo Guillermo Angulo; San Juan, PR
November 26, 2026*; 1:30 p.m.		vs. Wisconsin; Discover Puerto Rico Shootout						Coliseo Guillermo Angulo; San Juan, PR
November 27, 2026*; 11:00 a.m.		vs. Auburn; Discover Puerto Rico Shootout						Coliseo Guillermo Angulo; San Juan, PR
December 3, 2026*; 7:00 p.m., ESPNU		Oklahoma; ACC–SEC Challenge						JMA Wireless Dome; Syracuse, NY
December 6, 2026; 2:00 p.m., ACCNX		SMU						JMA Wireless Dome; Syracuse, NY
December 16, 2026*; 6:00 p.m.		at Le Moyne						Ted Grant Court; DeWitt, NY
December 18, 2026*; 10:00 a.m., ACCNX		Bucknell						JMA Wireless Dome; Syracuse, NY
December 28, 2026; 6:00 p.m., ACC Network		at Duke						Cameron Indoor Stadium; Durham, NC
December 31, 2026; 6:00 p.m., ACC Network		North Carolina						JMA Wireless Dome; Syracuse, NY
January 3, 2027; 4:00 p.m., ACC Network		at Virginia Tech						Cassell Coliseum; Blacksburg, VA
January 7, 2027; 6:00 p.m., ACCNX		Pittsburgh						JMA Wireless Dome; Syracuse, NY
January 10, 2027; 12:00 p.m., ACCNX		at Florida State						Donald L. Tucker Civic Center; Tallahassee, FL
January 14, 2027; 6:00 p.m., ACCNX		Boston College						JMA Wireless Dome; Syracuse, NY
January 17, 2027; 3:00 p.m., ACCNX		Notre Dame						JMA Wireless Dome; Syracuse, NY
January 21, 2027; 10:00 p.m., ACCNX		at Stanford						Maples Pavilion; Stanford, CA
January 24, 2027; 6:00 p.m., ACC Network		at California						Haas Pavilion; Berkeley, CA
January 28, 2027; 6:00 p.m., ACCNX		Miami (FL)						JMA Wireless Dome; Syracuse, NY
January 31, 2027; 6:00 p.m., ACC Network		at Georgia Tech						McCamish Pavilion; Atlanta, GA
February 7, 2027; 12:00 p.m., ACC Network		NC State						JMA Wireless Dome; Syracuse, NY
February 11, 2027; 6:00 p.m., ACC Network		at Louisville						KFC Yum! Center; Louisville, KY
February 14, 2027; 2:00 p.m., ACCNX		Virginia						JMA Wireless Dome; Syracuse, NY
February 18, 2027; 6:00 p.m., ACCNX		at Boston College						Conte Forum; Chestnut Hill, MA
February 22, 2027; 6:00 p.m., ESPN2		at Clemson						Littlejohn Coliseum; Clemson, SC
February 28, 2027; 12:00 p.m., ACC Network		Wake Forest						JMA Wireless Dome; Syracuse, NY
*Non-conference game. ^{#}Rankings from AP Poll. (#) Tournament seedings in parentheses. All times are in Eastern.
