= 2026–27 Dartmouth Big Green women's basketball team =

American college basketball season

2026–27 Dartmouth Big Green women's basketball
- Conference: Ivy League
- Record: 1–1 (0–0 Ivy)
- Head coach: Linda Cimino (4th season)
- Assistant coaches: Shelby Boyle; Sean Ehlbeck; Zenovia Walker
- Home arena: Leede Arena

2026–27 Ivy League women's basketball standings
	Conf.				Overall
Team	W		L	PCT	W		L	PCT
Columbia	0	–	0	–	1	–	0	1.000
Dartmouth	0	–	0	–	1	–	0	1.000
Penn	0	–	0	–	1	–	0	1.000
Princeton	0	–	0	–	1	–	0	1.000
Yale	0	–	0	–	1	–	0	1.000
Brown	0	–	0	–	0	–	1	.000
Cornell	0	–	0	–	0	–	1	.000
Harvard	0	–	0	–	0	–	1	.000
† 2027 Ivy League tournament winner As of November 6, 2026

The 2026–27 Dartmouth Big Green women's basketball team currently represents Dartmouth College during the 2026–27 NCAA Division I women's basketball season. The Big Green, led by fourth-year head coach Linda Cimino, play their home games at Leede Arena in Hanover, New Hampshire and compete as a member of the Ivy League.

== Previous season ==
The Big Green finished the 2025–26 season 10–21 overall and 1–13 in Ivy League play, finishing last in the conference for the fourth straight season. They failed to qualify for the Ivy League tournament.

== Offseason ==
=== Departures ===
Dartmouth departures
Name	Number	Pos.	Height	Year	Hometown	Reason for departure
Nina Minicozzi	1	Guard	5'8"	Junior	Belmont, MA	Entered transfer portal
Olivia Lawlor	10	Forward	6'1"	Senior	Summit, NJ	Graduated, entered transfer portal (Note: Did not play in the 2025–26 season.)
Brooke Hollawell	20	Guard	5'9"	Senior	Wall, NJ	Graduated
Clare Meyer	25	Forward	6'3"	Senior	Philadelphia, PA	Graduated

=== Incoming transfers ===
Dartmouth incoming transfers
Name	Number	Pos.	Height	Year	Hometown	Previous school
Magda Freire	12	Guard	5'8"	Junior	Lisbon, Portugal	Queens

=== Recruiting class ===
There was no 2026 recruiting class.

== Preseason ==
On October 7, 2026, the Ivy League released its annual preseason poll. Dartmouth was picked to finish last in the conference.

=== Preseason rankings ===
Ivy League Preseason Poll
Place	Team	Votes
1	Princeton	161 (15)
2	Columbia	149 (5)
3	Harvard	131 (1)
4	Penn	104
5	Brown	74
6	Cornell	60
7	Yale	48
8	Dartmouth	29
(#) first-place votes

== Roster ==
2026–27 Dartmouth Big Green women's basketball team
Players
Coaches

Pos.	#	Name	Height	Year	Previous school	Hometown
G	1	Maya Shifrin	5 ft 4 in (1.63 m)	Fr	École Notre Dame des Victoires	Lyon, France
G	2	Emma Olausson	6 ft 0 in (1.83 m)	So	Hamden Hall Country Day School	Guilford, CT
G	3	Jacalyn Myrthill	5 ft 5 in (1.65 m)	So	Mount Paran Christian School	Atlanta, GA
F	4	Cate MacDonald	6 ft 1 in (1.85 m)	Sr	New Hampton School	Lynnfield, MA
G	5	Ellie Cerf	5 ft 6 in (1.68 m)	Jr	Bethlehem Central High School	Delmar, NY
G	10	Anna Beischer	5 ft 10 in (1.78 m)	Fr	San Francisco University High School	San Francisco, CA
G	11	Alexandra Eldredge	5 ft 11 in (1.8 m)	Sr	Worcester Academy; Southern Utah	McLean, VA
G	12	Magda Freire	5 ft 8 in (1.73 m)	Jr	Escola Amelia Rey Colaço; Queens	Lisbon, Portugal
G	13	Zeynep Ozel	5 ft 8 in (1.73 m)	Jr	Blair Academy	Istanbul, Turkey
F	14	Yufei Zou	6 ft 4 in (1.93 m)	So	IMG Academy	Tianjin, China
G	15	Tahira Muhammad	5 ft 8 in (1.73 m)	Jr	Noble and Greenough School	Hyde Park, MA
F	21	Olivia Austin	6 ft 1 in (1.85 m)	Jr	Nazareth Academy	Western Springs, IL
G	22	Sierra Carson	5 ft 8 in (1.73 m)	Sr	Oxford Hills Comprehensive High School	Norway, ME
G	23	Izzy Cruz	5 ft 8 in (1.73 m)	Fr	Loomis Chaffee School	Stafford Springs, CT
F	24	Debra Hill	6 ft 1 in (1.85 m)	So	Blair Academy	Bedminster, NJ
F	34	Eve Jungman	6 ft 4 in (1.93 m)	Fr	Washington-Liberty High School	Arlington, VA
F	44	Peyton Hoblock	6 ft 3 in (1.91 m)	Fr	Shaker High School	Loudonville, NY

Head coach

- Linda Cimino (Adelphi)

Assistant coach(es)

- Shelby Boyle (Boston College)
- Sean Ehlbeck (Maryland)
- Zenoviah Walker (Transylvania)

Legend

- (C) Team captain
- (S) Suspended
- (I) Ineligible
- (W) Walk-on
- Injured
- Current redshirt

Roster
Last update: September 14, 2026

== Schedule and results ==
Date time, TV	Rank^{#}	Opponent^{#}	Result	Record	High points	High rebounds	High assists	Site (attendance) city, state
Non-conference regular season
November 2, 2026*; 6:30 p.m., ESPN+		Boston University	W 56–49	1–0	14 – Macdonald	8 – Macdonald	4 – Tied	Leede Arena (824); Hanover, NH
November 5, 2026*; 6:00 p.m., ESPN+		at Holy Cross	L 46–49	1–1	13 – Eldredge	14 – Macdonald	3 – Carson	Hart Center Arena (489); Worcester, MA
November 11, 2026*; TBA		New Hampshire						Leede Arena; Hanover, NH
November 14, 2026*; TBA		NJIT						Leede Arena; Hanover, NH
November 28, 2026*; TBA		St. Joseph's–Brooklyn						Leede Arena; Hanover, NH
November 30, 2026*; 6:00 p.m.		at New Haven						The Hazell Center; West Haven, CT
December 2, 2026*; TBA		Siena						Leede Arena; Hanover, NH
December 5, 2026*; TBA		Iona						Leede Arena; Hanover, NH
December 9, 2026*; TBA		at UMass Lowell						Kennedy Family Athletic Complex; Lowell, MA
December 12, 2026*; TBA		at Merrimack						Lawler Arena; Andover, MA
December 16, 2026*; TBA		at St. John's						Carnesecca Arena; Queens, NY
December 18, 2026*; TBA		at Rhode Island						Ryan Center; Kingston, RI
December 28, 2026*; TBA		Vermont						Leede Arena; Hanover, NH
Ivy League regular season
January 2, 2027; TBA		at Harvard						Lavietes Pavilion; Cambridge, MA
January 9, 2027; TBA		at Cornell						Newman Arena; Ithaca, NY
January 16, 2027; TBA		Penn						Leede Arena; Hanover, NH
January 18, 2027; TBA		Princeton						Leede Arena; Hanover, NH
January 23, 2027; TBA		Columbia						Leede Arena; Hanover, NH
January 29, 2027; TBA		at Yale						John J. Lee Amphitheater; New Haven, CT
January 30, 2027; TBA		at Brown						Pizzitola Sports Center; Providence, RI
February 6, 2027; TBA		Harvard						Leede Arena; Hanover, NH
February 12, 2027; TBA		Yale						Leede Arena; Hanover, NH
February 13, 2027; TBA		Brown						Leede Arena; Hanover, NH
February 20, 2027; TBA		at Columbia						Levien Gymnasium; New York, NY
February 26, 2027; TBA		at Penn						The Palestra; Philadelphia, PA
February 27, 2027; TBA		at Princeton						Jadwin Gymnasium; Princeton, NJ
March 6, 2027; TBA		Cornell						Leede Arena; Hanover, NH
*Non-conference game. ^{#}Rankings from AP Poll. (#) Tournament seedings in parentheses. All times are in Eastern.
