= Silver High School =

Coordinates: 32°47′48″N 108°15′58″W

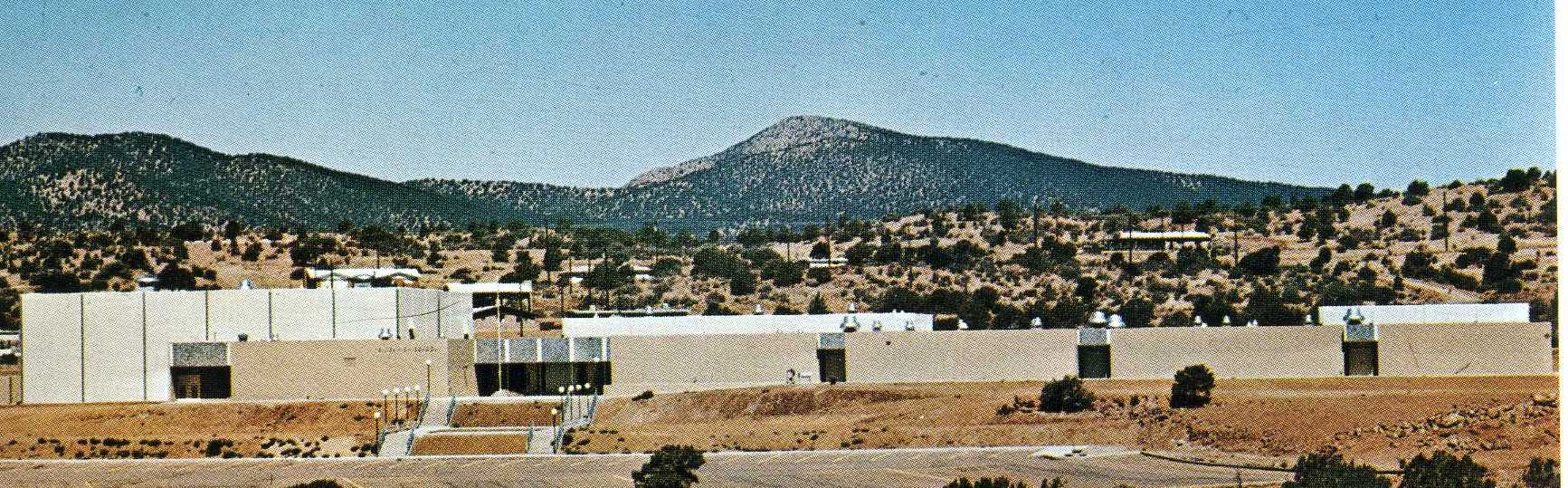
- Silver High from the East

Location
- 3200 N Silver St; Silver City, New Mexico 88061; United States

Information
- Type: Public, Grades 9-12
- Established: 1960
- Principal: Beth Lougee
- Faculty: 36.50 (FTE)
- Enrollment: 645 (2023–2024)
- Student to teacher ratio: 17.67
- Colors: Blue and Silver
- Nickname: Home of the Fighting Colts
- Yearbook: El Potrillo
- Information: (575)388-1563; 3200 N. Silver St. Silver City, NM 88061
- Website: www.silverschools.org/silver-high-school-2

Silver High School is a high school in Silver City, New Mexico. The school was opened in its current location in 1967. It was previously known as Western High School and was part of Western New Mexico University.

== History ==
In 1949, New Mexico State Teachers College became New Mexico Western College. At the same time, the name of the high school was changed to Western High. In 1960, the school became under the authority of the Silver City Board of Education. At that time, the school's name was changed from Western High School to Silver High School.

== Construction ==
In 1966, the present high school building was opened on 32nd street and Silver streets.

The dedication for the new building was held on Sunday, October 29, 1967, at 2:30 p.m., where Superintendent John H. Gaines presided. The school's construction had ended the summer before. At the time, the present enrollment of Silver High was 568 for the 10th, 11th and 12th grades, which was a 15% increase from the year before. The new high school started with 28 teachers plus administrative and maintenance staff.

== Current Administration ==
- Principal - Shane Coker
- Assistant Principal -Claudia Smith
- Assistant Principal and Athletic Director - Gary Allison

== Athletics ==
Silver High School has historically been a 4A division school in the New Mexico Activities Association (the state agency responsible for managing high school athletics in New Mexico), but for the 2010–11 school year, SHS was reduced to a 3A rating. Divisions are based on school enrollment and determine which other high schools, in the relevant geographical district, the school competes with.

- Softball (Current 7x in a row State Champions)
- Football
- Baseball
- Wrestling
- Boys Basketball
- Girls Basketball
- Volleyball
- Track
- Cheerleading
- Cross Country
- Golf
- Girls Soccer
- Boys Soccer
- Tennis

== Other ==
- Drama
- Choir
- Marching Band
- Concert Band
- Jazz Band
- Key Club
- Chess Club
- Student Council
- FCCLA
- FFA
- Dance [Varsity and JV]
- National Honor Society
- Science Olympiad
- Mathematics
- National History Day
