= 2026–27 Princeton Tigers women's basketball team =

Intercollegiate basketball season

2026–27 Princeton Tigers women's basketball
- Conference: Ivy League
- Record: 6–1 (0–0 Ivy)
- Head coach: Lauren Gosselin (1st season)
- Assistant coaches: Lindsey Werner; Jordan Edwards; Jenna Rose
- Home arena: Jadwin Gymnasium

2026–27 Ivy League women's basketball standings
	Conf.				Overall
Team	W		L	PCT	W		L	PCT
Princeton	0	–	0	–	5	–	1	.833
Dartmouth	0	–	0	–	4	–	1	.800
Penn	0	–	0	–	4	–	1	.800
Yale	0	–	0	–	4	–	1	.800
Columbia	0	–	0	–	3	–	2	.600
Harvard	0	–	0	–	3	–	2	.600
Cornell	0	–	0	–	2	–	2	.500
Brown	0	–	0	–	1	–	3	.250
† 2027 Ivy League tournament winner As of November 19, 2026

The 2026–27 Princeton Tigers women's basketball team currently represents Princeton University during the 2026–27 NCAA Division I women's basketball season. The Tigers, led by first-year head coach Lauren Gosselin, play their home games at Jadwin Gymnasium in Princeton, New Jersey, and compete as a member of the Ivy League.

== Previous season ==
The Tigers finished the 2025–26 season 26–4 overall and 12–2 in Ivy League play, finishing as conference regular season champions for the nineteenth time in program history. As the top seed in the Ivy League tournament, they defeated No. 4 Brown 65–51 in the semifinals and advanced to the championship game, where they took down defending champions No. 3 Harvard 63–53 to claim the Ivy League title and earn an automatic bid to the NCAA tournament.

The Tigers were seeded No. 9 in the Sacramento #2 Regional. They lost in the first round 68–82 to No. 8. Oklahoma State to end their season.

On March 25, four days after the end of the season, head coach Carla Berube left the program after seven years with the team in order to take the head coaching job at Northwestern. Two weeks later on April 8, Lauren Gosselin was promoted to the head coach position after serving as the program's associated head coach for the past three seasons.

=== Departures ===
Princeton departures
Name	Number	Pos.	Height	Year	Hometown	Reason for departure
Taylor Charles	11	Forward	6'2"	Senior	Elgin, IL	Graduated
Madison St. Rose	23	Guard	5'10"	Senior	Old Bridge, NJ	Graduated, transferred to Notre Dame

=== Incoming transfers ===
There were no incoming transfers for the 2026–27 season.

=== Recruiting class ===
College recruiting
Name	Hometown	School	Height	Weight	Commit date
Ava Yoon; G	Rockville, MD	Sidwell Friends School	5 ft 8 in (1.73 m)	N/A	
Ava Yoon; G	Recruit ratings: 247Sports:				
Overall recruit ranking:
Note: In many cases, Scout, Rivals, 247Sports, On3, and ESPN may conflict in their listings of height and weight.; In these cases, the average was taken. ESPN grades are on a 100-point scale.; Sources: "2026 Player Commits". ESPN. Archived from the original on September 14, 2026.

== Preseason ==
On October 7, 2026, the Ivy League released its annual preseason poll. Princeton was picked to finish first in the conference, with fifteen first place votes.

=== Preseason rankings ===
Ivy League Preseason Poll
Place	Team	Votes
1	Princeton	161 (15)
2	Columbia	149 (5)
3	Harvard	131 (1)
4	Penn	104
5	Brown	74
6	Cornell	60
7	Yale	48
8	Dartmouth	29
(#) first-place votes

== Roster ==
2026–27 Princeton Tigers women's basketball team
Players
Coaches

Pos.	#	Name	Height	Year	Previous school	Hometown
F	1	Emily Eadie	6 ft 0 in (1.83 m)	Jr	Sage Hill School	Newport Beach, CA
G/F	2	Olivia Hutcherson (C)	5 ft 11 in (1.8 m)	Sr	Holy Innocents' Episcopal School	Johns Creek, GA
G	3	Cristina Parrella	5 ft 10 in (1.78 m)	Jr	Saddle River Day School	Closter, NJ
G	4	Grace O'Sullivan	6 ft 0 in (1.83 m)	So	Rivers School	Acton, MA
G/F	5	Fadima Tall	6 ft 0 in (1.83 m)	Sr	Georgetown Visitation Prep	Silver Spring, MD
G	7	Ava Yoon	5 ft 8 in (1.73 m)	Fr	Sidwell Friends School	Rockville, MD
F	8	Sarah Lessig	6 ft 2 in (1.88 m)	So	Garfield High School	Seattle, WA
G/F	9	Sarah Aldeguer	6 ft 2 in (1.88 m)	Fr	Fairmont Preparatory Academy	Santa Ana, CA
G	10	Skye Belker (C)	5 ft 9 in (1.75 m)	Sr	Windward School	Los Angeles, CA
G	11	Mei-Ling Perry	5 ft 10 in (1.78 m)	Fr	Troy High School	Irvine, CA
G	13	Ashley Chea	5 ft 8 in (1.73 m)	Sr	Flintridge Prep	Los Angeles, CA
G	21	Toby Nweke	5 ft 9 in (1.75 m)	Jr	Georgetown Visitation Prep	Woodbine, MA
G/F	22	Eva Smith	6 ft 1 in (1.85 m)	Fr	St Hilda's Anglican School for Girls	Cottesloe, Australia
G	24	Mari Bickley	5 ft 10 in (1.78 m)	Sr	Laurel School	Akron, OH

Head coach

- Lauren Gosselin (Bentley)

Assistant coach(es)

- Lindsay Werner (Merrimack)
- Jordan Edwards (High Point)
- Jenna Ross (Utah)

Legend

- (C) Team captain
- (S) Suspended
- (I) Ineligible
- (W) Walk-on
- Injured
- Current redshirt

Roster
Last update: September 14, 2026

== Schedule and results ==
Date time, TV	Rank^{#}	Opponent^{#}	Result	Record	High points	High rebounds	High assists	Site (attendance) city, state
Non-conference regular season
November 2, 2026*; 7:30 p.m., ESPN+		Belmont	W 63–52	1–0	29 – Tall	22 – Tall	5 – Belker	Jadwin Gymnasium (481); Princeton, NJ
November 6, 2026*; 6:00 p.m., ESPN+		at Richmond; Opening Statement	W 65–57	2–0	27 – Tall	10 – Tall	6 – Belker	Robins Center; Richmond, VA
November 8, 2026*; 12:00 p.m., ESPN+f		vs. Murray State; Opening Statement	W 76–74	3–0	28 – Belker	8 – Tall	5 – Tall	Robins Center; Richmond, VA
November 10, 2026*; 7:00 p.m., NBCSP/SNY		Villanova	W 81–74	4–0	28 – Tall	7 – Tied	6 – Chea	Jadwin Gymnasium (651); Princeton, NJ
November 13, 2026*; 9:00 p.m., ESPN+		at Pepperdine	W 49–41	5–0	14 – Tall	7 – Eadie	3 – Belker	Firestone Fieldhouse (526); Malibu, CA
November 15, 2026*; 6:00 p.m., BTN		at No. 10т UCLA	L 34–55	5–1	9 – Tall	6 – Tied	2 – Tied	Pauley Pavilion (8,909); Los Angeles, CA
November 18, 2026*; 7:00 p.m., ESPN+		George Mason	W 55–53	6–1	26 – Tall	16 – Tall	5 – Belker	Jadwin Gymnasium (442); Princeton, NJ
November 22, 2026*; 1:00 p.m.		Georgia Tech						Jadwin Gymnasium; Princeton, NJ
November 25, 2026*; 12:00 p.m.		Rutgers						Jadwin Gymnasium; Princeton, NJ
December 2, 2026*; 7:00 p.m.		at Seton Hall						Walsh Gymnasium; South Orange, NJ
December 5, 2026*; TBA		at Rice						Tudor Fieldhouse; Houston, TX
December 7, 2026*; TBA		at Houston Christian						Sharp Gymnasium; Houston, TX
December 10, 2026*; 11:00 a.m.		Rhode Island						Jadwin Gymnasium; Princeton, NJ
December 13, 2026*; 1:00 p.m.		Portland						Jadwin Gymnasium; Princeton, NJ
January 1, 2027*; 1:00 p.m.		Oregon State						Jadwin Gymnasium; Princeton, NJ
Ivy League regular season
January 5, 2027; 6:00 p.m.		Penn						Jadwin Gymnasium; Princeton, NJ
January 9, 2027; 2:00 p.m.		Yale						Jadwin Gymnasium; Princeton, NJ
January 16, 2027; TBA		at Harvard						Lavietes Pavilion; Cambridge, MA
January 18, 2027; TBA		at Dartmouth						Leede Arena; Hanover, NH
January 23, 2027; 2:00 p.m.		Brown						Jadwin Gymnasium; Princeton, NJ
January 29, 2027; TBA		at Cornell						Newman Arena; Ithaca, NY
January 30, 2027; TBA		at Columbia						Levien Gymnasium; New York, NY
February 6, 2027; TBA		at Penn						The Palestra; Philadelphia, PA
February 12, 2027; 7:00 p.m.		Cornell						Jadwin Gymnasium; Princeton, NJ
February 13, 2027; 5:00 p.m.		Columbia						Jadwin Gymnasium; Princeton, NJ
February 20, 2027; TBA		at Brown						Pizzitola Sports Center; Providence, RI
February 26, 2027; 7:00 p.m.		Harvard						Jadwin Gymnasium; Princeton, NJ
February 27, 2027; 5:00 p.m.		Dartmouth						Jadwin Gymnasium; Princeton, NJ
March 6, 2027; TBA		at Yale						John J. Lee Amphitheater; New Haven, CT
*Non-conference game. ^{#}Rankings from AP Poll. (#) Tournament seedings in parentheses. All times are in Eastern.
