= Western High School (New Mexico) =

Coordinates: 32°46′35″N 108°16′51″W

- Western High School from West Avenue
- Interactive map of the Western High School area
- Alternative names: Old Silver High

General information
- Type: School
- Location: West Avenue, Silver City, New Mexico, United States
- Completed: 1939
- Demolished: 1983

Technical details
- Structural system: Concrete

Design and construction
- Main contractor: Bradbury and Marchant of Albuquerque

Western High School was a building located in Silver City, New Mexico. It was the former location of Silver High School before the current location of Silver High School was built.

== History ==
Silver City, was founded in 1870. The first public school opened in 1874. On February 11, 1893, when the Thirtieth Session of the Territorial Legislature of New Mexico passed "An Act to Establish and Provide for the Maintenance and Government of the Normal Schools of New Mexico." The location of the school was chosen on a hill so that people coming to town could see the school clearly.

Old Silver High School before destruction, 1982

In 1918, the first high school was opened, and was part of the Normal School. In the 1920s, the New Mexico Normal School became the New Mexico State Teachers' College. The regents made the High School a separate department of the school. In 1926, the high school became the Grant County High School. The school became accredited in 1934. Because of increasing population growth in the area, the old facilities were no longer accommodatable. Plans to create a new high school were being drawn up in 1937.

The Chamber of Commerce and local governments proposed creating a new high school that could accommodate 600 students. Governor Tingley, the governor of New Mexico at the time, approved the sale of bonds to get the project started.

In 1949, State Teachers College became New Mexico Western College. At the same time, the name of the high school was changed to Western High. Because the funding of the high school, in 1939, was by a legislative appropriation by a Silver City bond issue, a suit found that the university should transfer the title of the building and furnishings to the Silver City School District and cease to operate it. In 1960, the school became under the authority of the Silver City Board of Education. At that time, the school's name was changed to Silver High School.

== Silver High School ==
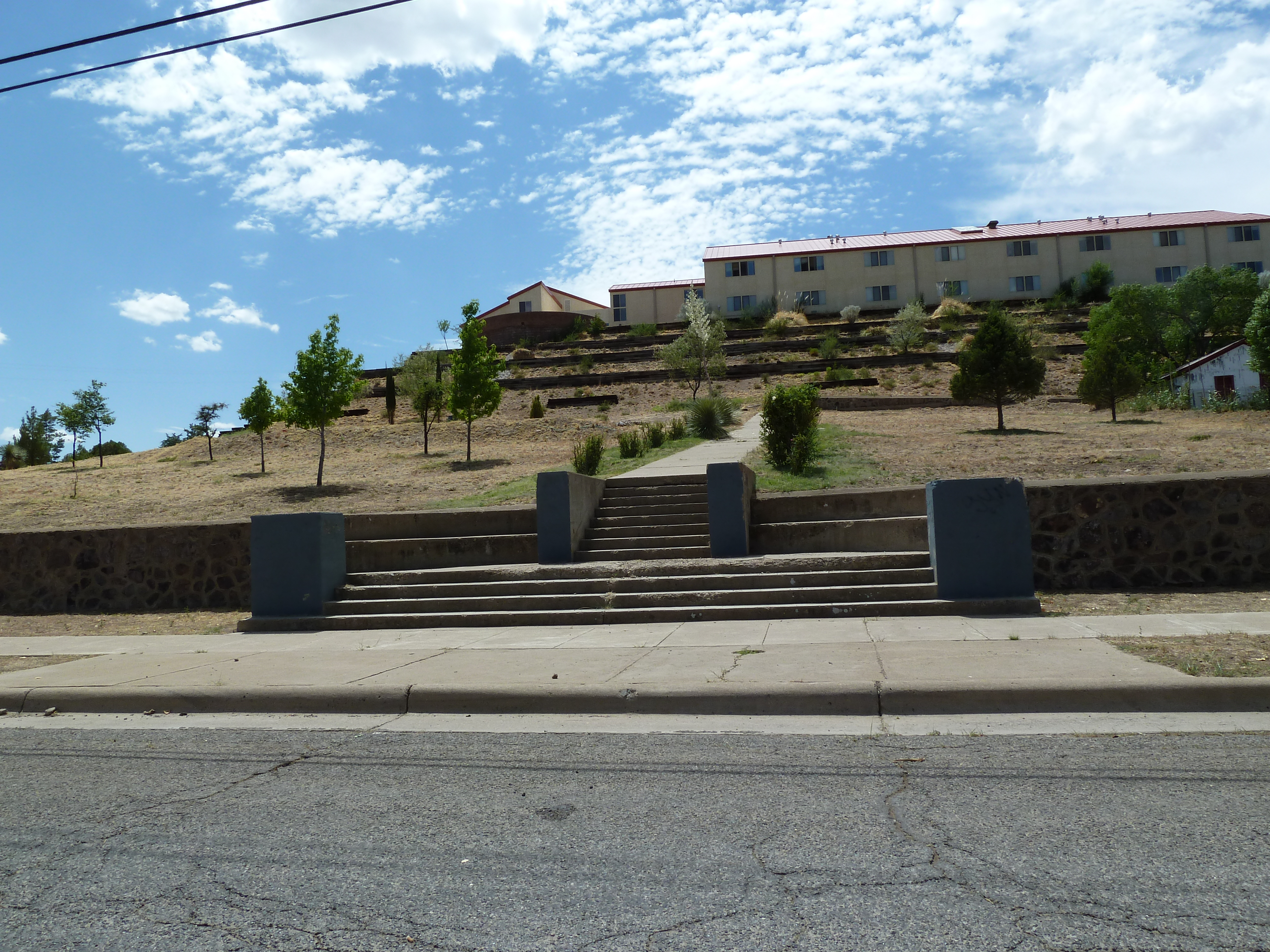
Western High location in 2011. Western New Mexico Centennial Hall dormitories are located at the top of the property which were erected in 1993.

In 1965, the school had become overcrowded to the point that split sessions were required. In 1966, the present high school building was built on 32nd and Silver streets. The old school building remained vacant and was used for various activities.

== Demolition ==
The building was purchased by Neil Parrish and Larry Phifer to develop the building into apartments. During the reroofing project, it was determined that there was significant water damage to the building. The amount of money required to renovate the building was astronomical. Demolition activities began, but because the building was so well built, the demolition activities proved difficult. The building stood partially demolished until 1983. The university repurchased the building and completed the demolition. The concrete stairs leading up to the former building can still be seen today.

The former location of the building holds the location of dormitories for the Western New Mexico College.
