= Walt Whitman High School =

Walt Whitman High School may refer to:

- Walt Whitman High School (Maryland) in Bethesda, Maryland
- Walt Whitman High School (New York) in Huntington Station, New York
- Walt Whitman Community School in Dallas, Texas
- Walt Whitman High School, fictional high school in the television drama comedy Room 222 (1969-1974)
