= Watertown High School =

Watertown High School may refer to:

- Watertown High School (Connecticut) in Watertown, Connecticut
- Watertown High School (Massachusetts) in Watertown, Massachusetts
- Watertown High School (New York) in Watertown, New York
- Watertown High School (South Dakota) in Watertown, South Dakota
- Watertown High School (Tennessee) in Watertown, Tennessee
- Watertown High School (Wisconsin) in Watertown, Wisconsin
