= Woodland High School =

Woodland High School may refer to schools in the United States:

- Woodland High School (California), Woodland, California
- Woodland High School (Cartersville, Georgia), Cartersville, Georgia
- Woodland High School (East Point, Georgia), East Point, Georgia
- Woodland High School (Stockbridge, Georgia), Stockbridge, Georgia
- Woodland High School (Illinois), Streator, Illinois
- Woodland High School in Baileyville, Maine
- Woodland High School, Fairfax, Oklahoma: See Woodland Public Schools (Oklahoma)
- Woodland High School (South Carolina), Dorchester, South Carolina
- Woodland High School (Washington), Woodland, Washington
