= Hybrid wood =

Hybrid wood or wood hybrid systems (WHS) is a multilayer composite material, composed on the surface of a skin made of composite wood (WPC) adhering to an underneath structural core, in general aluminum. Invented in Japan in 2008, this technological evolution is based on wood composite technology which was conceived in 1972 by Sadao Nishibori and patented in 1983 to substitute threatened exotic wood species. WHS are not fibre-reinforced plastic (FRP).

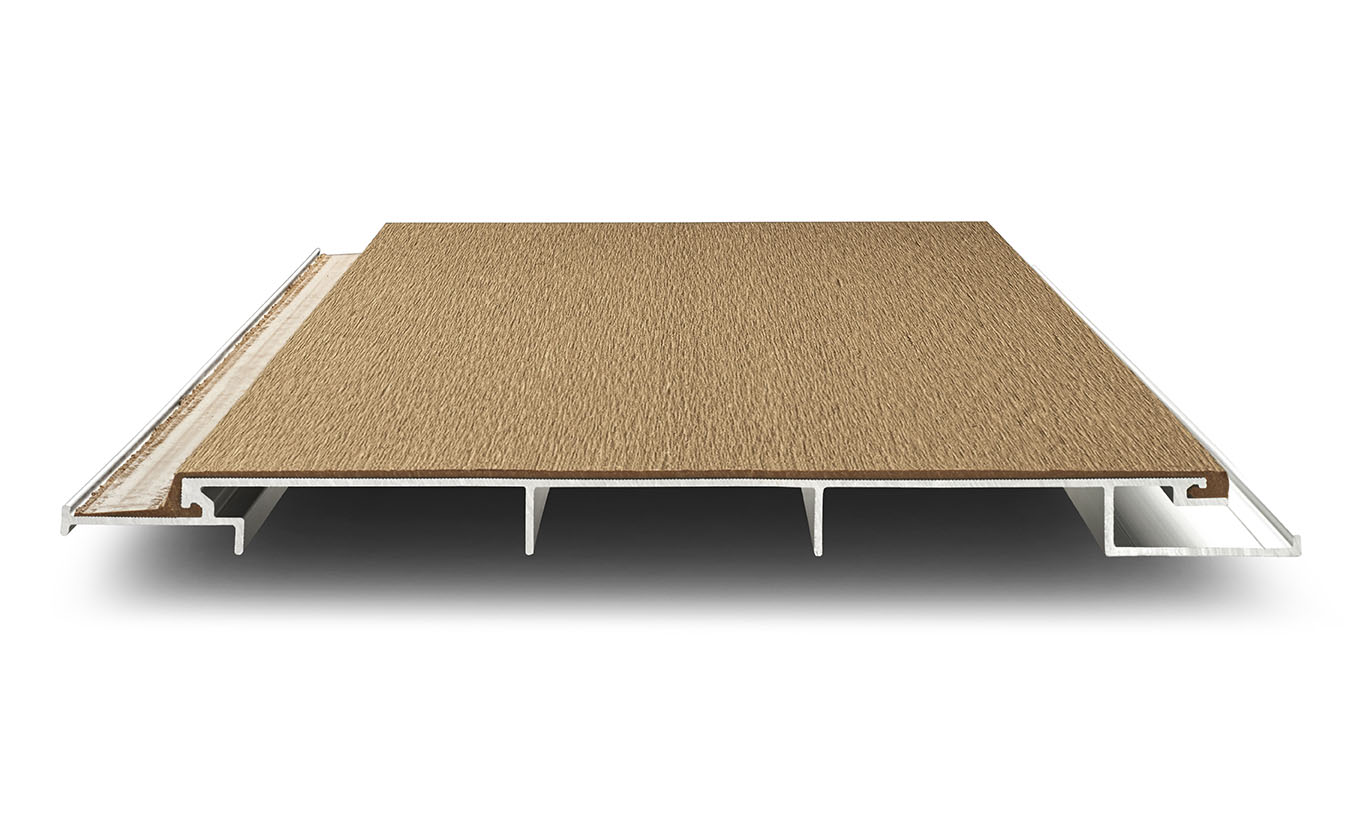
Wood Hybrid (siding)

In truth, speaking of hybrid wood profiles only makes sense when the outer layer – the composite wood – and the core – aluminum – are adhering sufficiently to each other to prevent any delamination under any climatic conditions to which they may be exposed. To this day, only coextrusion at high temperature of a powerful adhesive and of composite wood allows the "fusion" of 2 materials as different as aluminum and composite wood. This adhesiveness is so powerful that bending the profiles is possible even at very low radii, thus broadening significantly the fields of applications.

In the construction, decoration or design industry sector, hybrid woods have the look, feel and sometimes smell of natural wood. They are easier to install and better performing than natural wood and their exceptional properties allow utilizations that are many times broader than those of wood. They are used in exterior and interior applications such as façades trims, cladding, louvers, screens, pergola, canopies or any durable installations such as urban furniture for instance.

== Manufacturing ==
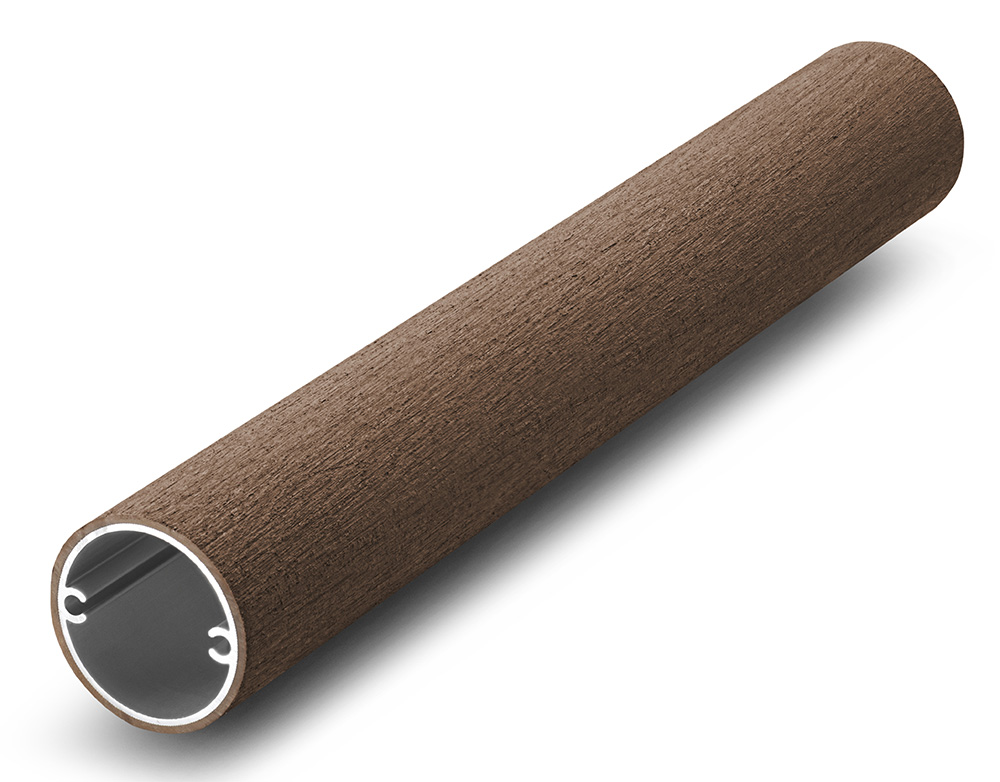
Hybrid wood

Wood hybrid profiles are obtained through extrusion. The wood composite covers a core in anodized aluminum core. The optimal adhesiveness between these two materials is made possible by applying a coextruded intermediate adhesive layer. The wood composite layer can be applied on only one side of the profile if so required. The wood fibers to resins ratio as well as the type of core vary according to the desired characteristics. Manufacturing of these profiles generates a low carbon print only if the raw materials are of recycled origin.

== Properties ==
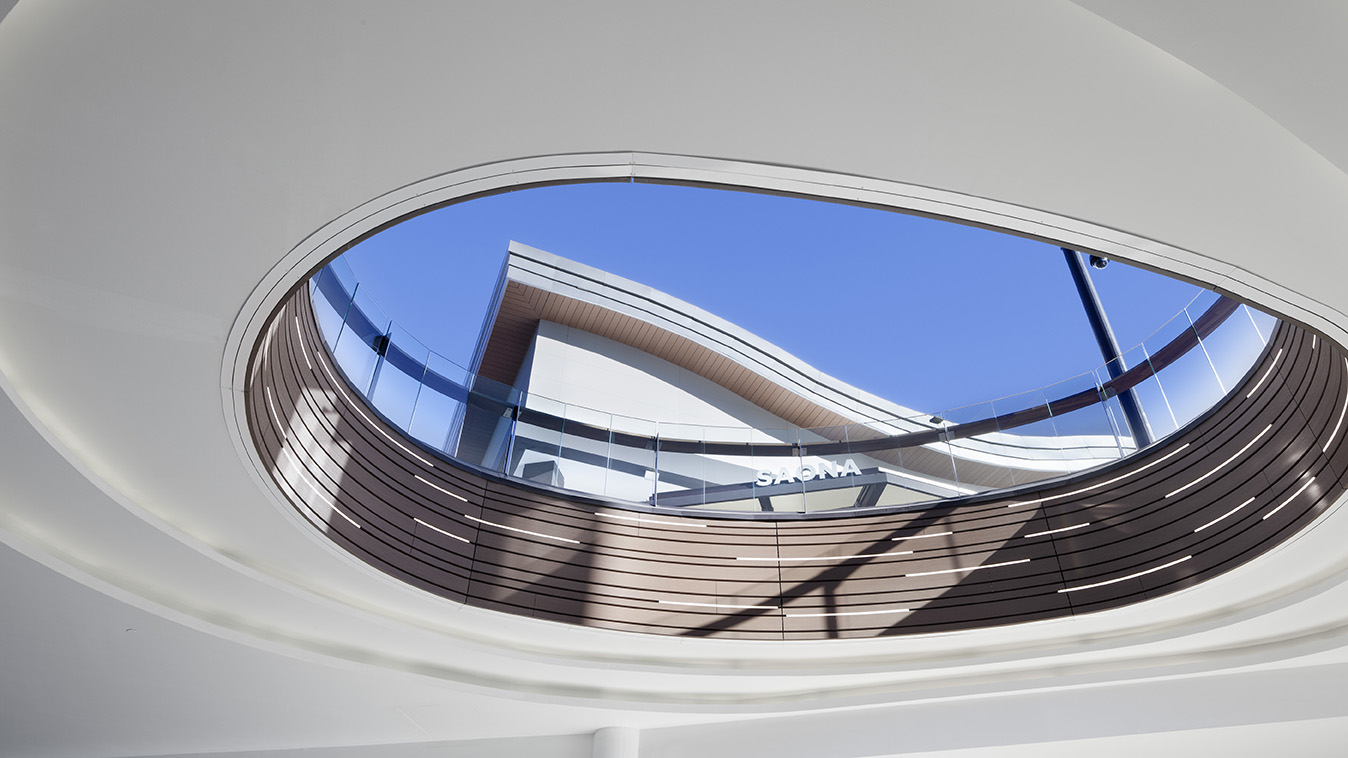
Bent hybrid wood

The lifetime of wood hybrid profiles is significantly longer than that of exotic woods, both internally and externally. For the same cross section, the aluminum used for the core allows the profile to be lighter, more stable (no shrinkage, no warping, no splinter, no knot) and more rigid than a natural wood profile, thus allowing longer spans between supports or longer cantilevers. Over time and without maintenance the aspect of the overall installation as well of the surface of the profiles will remain in accordance to the wishes of the designer or the architect. The material is rot proof, is insensitive to bad weather, sun exposure, fungus or termites. The combination of the physical properties of the core and of the aesthetics of the composite wood allows hybrid woods to outperform:

- Composite woods: because of their mechanical properties, their dimensional stability, their lightness, and their ease of implementation.
- Natural woods: because of their durability, their original colorfastness, their lengths and cross sections and the lack of maintenance or staining, independently of the climatic conditions or the moisture level of their environment.

== History ==
Hollow composite woods, invented in 1992, offer a weak mechanical resistance. During their installation as railings or louvers, it is imperative that metallic supporting rods be inserted in the cells in order to avoid the profiles to flex, buckle or warp. Without these rods and for this particular technology, these disturbances remain unavoidable under the joint actions of bad weather, of the sun and of moisture intake by the material. The use of the supporting rods creates another issue: the notable difference of the expansion coefficient of both raw materials (a 3.5 factor between hybrid wood and metal) creates frequent disturbances, even when installation has been carefully made. For a horizontal installation, the stagnation of condensation waters between composite and metal decreases the durability of the installation.

In 2008, major technological advancements allowed to marry two distinct technologies: extrusion of a correctly assayed compound and application through extrusion at high temperature of a layered adhesive. This "fusion" of such different materials – composite wood and aluminum – is made possible by the thin adhesive layered sandwiched between outer skin and central core. This breakthrough allows today to market easy to install products with the look and feel of exotic wood and perfectly durable without maintenance.

== Applications ==
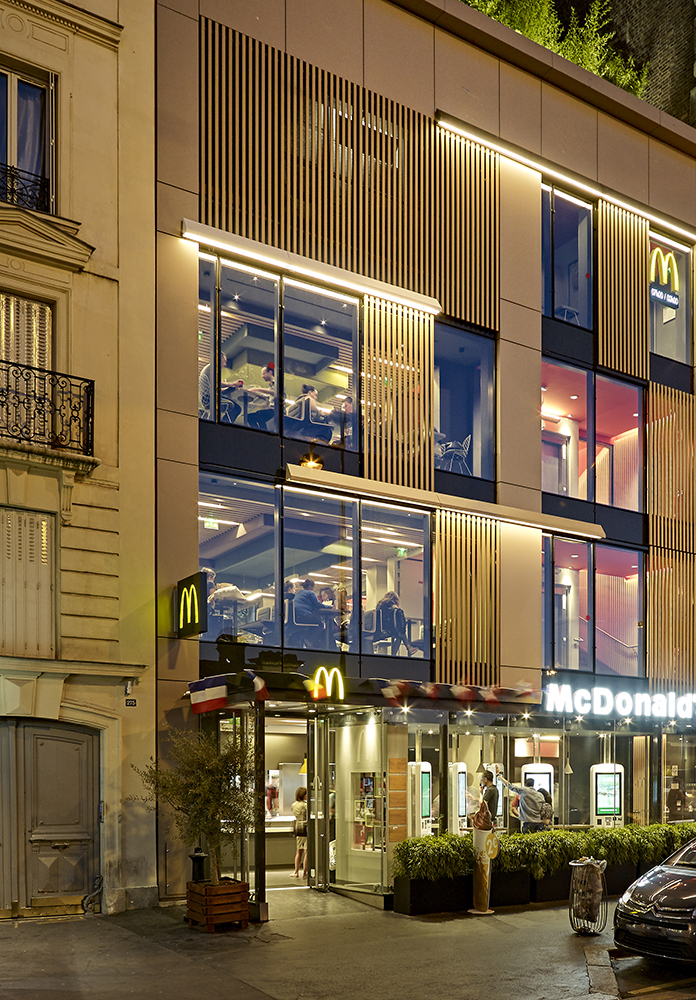
Façade in hybrid wood

For new buildings as well as for renovations, hybrid wood profiles are perfectly suitable for cladding, siding, screen wall, windbreak, fence, pergola, trims, louvers and railings.

== See also ==
- Advanced composite materials (engineering)
- Composite material
- Hybrid material
