= Williston High School =

Williston High School may refer to:

- Williston High School (Florida) — Williston, Florida
- Williston High School (North Dakota) — Williston, North Dakota
- Williston Northampton School — Easthampton, Massachusetts
- Williston-Elko High School — Williston, South Carolina
- Williston Industrial School — Wilmington, North Carolina
