= Woodbridge High School =

Several high schools are called Woodbridge High School including:

Canada

- Woodbridge College, Woodbridge, Ontario (1958–1991)

United Kingdom

- Woodbridge High School, Woodford Green, Woodford Bridge, London

United States

- Woodbridge High School (Irvine, California)
- Woodbridge High School (Bridgeville, Delaware)
- Woodbridge High School (New Jersey), Woodbridge, New Jersey
- Woodbridge High School (Virginia), Woodbridge, Virginia
