= Pinewood School =

Pinewood School may refer to:

- Pinewood School, Los Altos, California, United States
- Pinewood School, Bourton, Vale of White Horse, Oxfordshire, England
- Pinewood Preparatory School, Summerville, South Carolina, United States
- Pinewood School, Blackburn, Scotland

== See also ==
- Pinewood Elementary School (disambiguation)
