= Wylie High School =

Wylie High School may refer to:

- Wylie High School (Abilene, Texas), United States
- Wylie High School (Wylie, Texas), United States
