= Pinewood Elementary School =

Pinewood Elementary School may refer to:

In Canada:

- Pinewood Elementary School (Cranbrook, British Columbia)
- Pinewood Elementary School (Delta, British Columbia)
- Pinewood Elementary School (Prince George), British Columbia
- Pinewood Elementary School (North Delta, British Columbia)
- Pinewood Elementary School (Mascouche, Quebec) - Sir Wilfrid Laurier School Board

In the United States:

- Pinewood Elementary School (Jacksonville, Arkansas)
- Pinewood Elementary School (Mims, Florida)
- Pinewood Elementary School (Timonium, Maryland)
- Pinewood Elementary School (Mounds View, Minnesota)
- Pinewood Elementary School (Omaha, Nebraska)
- Pinewood Community School (Eagan, Minnesota)
