= Westlake High School =

Westlake High School may refer to:

- Westlake High School (California), Westlake Village, California
- Westlake High School (Georgia), Atlanta, Georgia
- Westlake High School (Louisiana), Westlake, Louisiana
- Westlake High School (Maryland), Waldorf, Maryland
- Westlake High School (New York), Thornwood, New York
- Westlake High School (Ohio), Westlake, Ohio
- Westlake High School (Texas), near West Lake Hills, Texas
- Westlake High School (Utah), Saratoga Springs, Utah
- Harvard-Westlake School, Los Angeles, California
- Westlake Boys High School, Forrest Hill, Auckland, New Zealand
