= West (disambiguation) =

West is a cardinal direction or compass point.

West or The West may also refer to:

== Geography and locations ==
=== Global context ===
- The Western world
- Western culture and Western civilization in general
- The Western Bloc, countries allied with NATO during the Cold War
- The Occident, an early-modern term originated with geographical divisions mirroring the cultural divide between the Hellenistic east and Latin West, and the political divide between the Western and Eastern Roman empires

=== Regional contexts ===
- The American frontier, also called "The Old West" or "The Wild West", an American process of westward movement from 1600 to 1920
- Western United States, a region in the United States of America
- Western Canada
- Western Australia
- The Western Regions, a historical term for regions of Chinese suzerainty in Central Asia
- Western Territories (Ziemie Zachodnie) or Recovered Territories (Ziemie Odzyskane), Former eastern territories of Germany annexed to Poland
- West Region (Cameroon)
- West Bengal
- Canada West
- West Scotland (Scottish Parliament electoral region)
- Al-Maghrib (Arabic: المغرب, lit. 'the west'), Arabic name for Morocco, a country in Northwest Africa
- West River (South Dakota)

=== Rivers and localities ===
- West River (disambiguation)
- West (Cornish hundred) or West Wivelshire, a county subdivision of Cornwall, England
- West (London sub region), a sub-region of the London Plan
- West, Mississippi, United States
- West, Texas, United States
- West, West Virginia, United States
- West Township (disambiguation); all are in the United States

=== Astronomical locations ===
- Comet West, a comet discovered by Danish astronomer Richard M. West
- 2022 West, an asteroid

== Acronyms ==
- Wales Evangelical School of Theology
- Western European Summer Time
- Weinstein Enhanced Sensory Test, a monofilament esthesiometer
- Western European Satellite Triangulation subcommittee of IAG
- WEST (formerly Tore Supra), Tungsten (W) Environment in Steady-state Tokamak, the name for the refitted Tore Supra tokamak reactor in Cadarache, France

== People and fictional characters ==
- West (surname), list of people with surname West
- Justice West (disambiguation)
- West Rosen, a fictional character from the television series Heroes

== Film, television, and radio ==
- West (2007 film), a 2007 Australian drama directed by Daniel Krige
- West (2013 film), a German drama film directed by Christian Schwochow
- The West (1938 film), a 1938 French drama film
- The West (miniseries), a 1996 television documentary miniseries directed by Stephen Ives
- West (TV series), a 1973–74 Canadian documentary series
- WEST (TV network), a western television network
- WEST (AM), a radio station (1400 AM) licensed to Easton, Pennsylvania, United States

== Print media ==
- West (publisher), an American publisher
- "West" (short story), a story by Orson Scott Card
- The West (Mayakovsky), a 1922–1924 poetry cycle by Vladimir Mayakovsky
- West magazine, published in two separate periods by the Los Angeles Times (and otherwise known as the Los Angeles Times Magazine)
- San Jose Mercury News West Magazine or West, a Sunday magazine that succeeded the L.A. Times' West magazine
- The West Australian, a newspaper
- West (novel), a 2018 novel by Edith Pattou
- The West: The History of an Idea, a 2025 book by Georgios Varouxakis
- West (poetry collection), a 2023 poetry collection by Paisley Rekdal

== Music ==
- West (EP), an album by Ego Likeness
- West (Lucinda Williams album), 2007, or the title song
- West (Mark Eitzel album)
- The West (album), an album by Matmos, or the title song
- "West" (song), a rock song by The Alice Rose
- "West", a 2001 song by rock duo Pinback from their album Blue Screen Life

== Organizations ==
- West (brewery), a microbrewery in Glasgow, Scotland
- West Corporation, formerly West TeleServices
- West Hartlepool R.F.C. or simply West, a rugby football club
- West Race Cars, an American-Australian racing car manufacturer
- West High School (disambiguation)

== Other uses ==
- West (cigarette), a tobacco brand
- West, the command-line tool in Zephyr (operating system)
- Western Line (Auckland) (timetable code: WEST), New Zealand
- Toronto West Detention Centre, a maximum security remand facility
- Kingdom of the West, a region within the Society for Creative Anachronism
- One side in the East–West Shrine Game

== See also ==
- Westlife, an Irish band
- Western (disambiguation)
- Wests (disambiguation)
- Ouest (department), Haiti
- Ouest (disambiguation), French for West
- Oeste Subregion, Portugal
- Oeste (disambiguation), Portuguese and Spanish for West
