= Western =

Western may refer to:

== Culture and society ==
- Western world, geopolitical division
  - Western culture, collective culture of the countries that identify as "western"

== Places ==
- Western, Nebraska, a village in the United States
- Western, New York, a town in the United States
- Western Creek, Tasmania, a locality in Australia
- Western Junction, Tasmania, a locality in Australia
- Western United States, a region of the United States

== Arts and entertainment ==
- Western (genre), a category of fiction and visual art centered on the American Old West
  - Western fiction, the Western genre as featured in literature
  - Western film, the western genre in film
  - Western music (North America), a type of American folk music
  - Westerns on television, the western genre in television

=== Films ===
- Western (1997 film), a French road movie directed by Manuel Poirier
- Western (2017 film), a German-Austrian film

=== Music ===
- Westerns (EP), an EP by Pete Yorn
- WSTRN, a British hip hop group from west London
- "Western", a song by Black Midi from Schlagenheim

== Business ==
- The Western, a closed hotel/casino in Las Vegas, United States
- Western Cartridge Company, a manufacturer of ammunition
- Western Publishing, a defunct publishing company

== Educational institutions ==
- Western Washington University in Bellingham, Washington, United States
- Western Theological Seminary in Holland, Michigan, United States
- Western University of Health Sciences in Pomona, California, United States
- University of Western Ontario, London, Ontario, Canada (branded as Western University since 2012)
- Western University (Azerbaijan), Baku
- Western High School (disambiguation)

== Foods ==
- Denver sandwich or Western sandwich
- Western omelet

== Sport ==
- Western A.F.C., a football club from Christchurch, New Zealand
- Western F.C., a former football club from Glasgow, Scotland
- Western Mustangs, the athletic program of the University of Western Ontario (aka Western University)
- Western Open, a professional golf tournament
- Westerns cricket team, a cricket team in Zimbabwe

== Transportation ==
- Western (airline), an airline founded in 2006
- Western Railway (disambiguation), various railroads
- Western station (CTA Blue Line Forest Park branch)
- Western station (CTA Blue Line O'Hare branch)
- Western station (CTA Brown Line)
- Western station (CTA Orange Line)
- Western station (CTA Pink Line)
- British Rail Class 52 or Westerns, a class of locomotives
- Western Airlines, a defunct airline
- Western Express Air, a regional airline in Bullhead City, Arizona, United States
- Western Air, a Bahamian airline

== People ==
- Western (surname), a list of people with the surname

== Other uses ==
- Toronto Western Hospital, Toronto, Canada
- Western blot, an analytical technique to detect proteins

== See also ==
- Western Area, Sierra Leone
- Westerner (disambiguation)
- West (disambiguation)
- Western Avenue (disambiguation)
- Western Division (disambiguation)
- Western Range (disambiguation), various mountain and missile ranges
- Western Region (disambiguation)
- Western Suburbs (disambiguation)
- Weston (disambiguation)
- Wests (disambiguation)
