= Mario Sergio Conti =

Brazilian journalist and writer (born 1954)

Mario Sérgio Conti
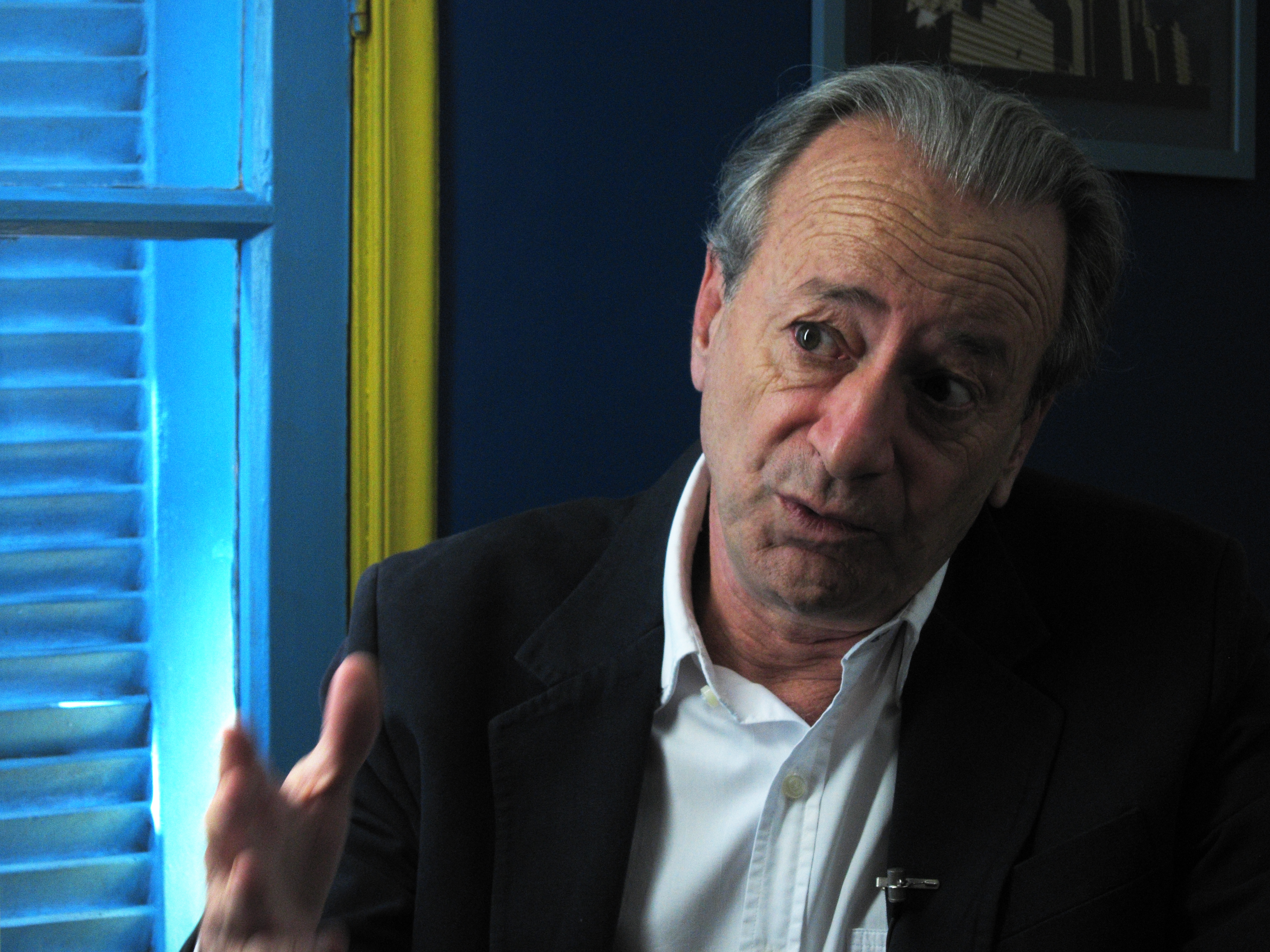
- Mario Sérgio Conti in 2013.
- Born: Mario Sergio Conti; 1954 (age 71–72); São Paulo, São Paulo, Brazil
- Education: University of São Paulo
- Occupations: Journalist; Writer; Translator; TV presenter
- Years active: 1977 – present
- Children: 4

Mario Sergio Conti (born 1954) is a journalist, writer, translator and television presenter. He was editor of Veja, Jornal do Brasil and Piauí. He wrote the book Notícias do Planalto: a Imprensa e Fernando Collor. He is currently a columnist for the newspaper Folha de S.Paulo and presents the television program Diálogos com Mario Sérgio Conti, on GloboNews.

== Biography ==
=== Early years and education ===
Mario Sergio Conti was born in São Paulo in 1954. His paternal grandfather came from a family of Italian fishermen from San Lucido in Calabria, Italy, who emigrated to Brazil after a tsunami destroyed their boats. His father, Mariano, was born in São Paulo and his mother was of French descent and lived near Osvaldo Cruz Square in the Paraíso neighborhood, also in the city of São Paulo.

Conti graduated in Journalism from the School of Communications and Arts (ECA) of University of São Paulo (USP).

=== Career ===
He began his professional life at the Folha de S.Paulo newspaper in 1977. After his time at the newspaper, he worked for 15 years at Veja magazine, where he became editor-in-chief. He left the weekly news magazine in 1998. At Veja, he took over as editor-in-chief from journalist José Roberto Guzzo, who had been in charge of the magazine for fifteen years. In 1999, he published the book Notícias do Planalto by Companhia das Letras, in which he studied the relationship between the Brazilian press and President Fernando Collor de Mello. In 2000, the book won the Jabuti prize in the reportage category.

After the book was published, in the early 2000s, he was one of the journalists on the NoMínimo website, alongside names such as Zuenir Ventura and Ivan Lessa. At Rádio Bandeirantes he worked as the station's correspondent in Paris. He returned to Brazil and for a short time was editor-in-chief of the Rio de Janeiro newspaper Jornal do Brasil.

In 2006, Mario alongside João Moreira Salles, Walter Salles, Dorrit Harazim and Marcos Sá Corrêa, founded piauí magazine, inspired by The New Yorker magazine, with the aim of creating a magazine with traces of the new journalism. In 2011, he left the magazine (becoming an occasional contributor) to take over the Roda Viva interview program on TV Cultura, replacing Marília Gabriela. During his time at the helm of the program, he interviewed names such as João Ubaldo Ribeiro, Tom Zé, Roberto Freire, Domenico De Masi, among others.

According to journalist and writer Elio Gaspari, in his column in the Folha de S. Paulo newspaper, Conti's premature dismissal – which took place in 2013 – was decided by Marcos Mendonça, who was close to the then governor of São Paulo, Geraldo Alckmin (PSDB) to manage the Padre Anchieta Foundation, responsible for controlling TV Cultura. Conti had invited former President Fernando Henrique Cardoso (PSDB) for an interview, when Mendonça disinvited the tucano. When he found out, Conti called Cardoso again and kept the interview that aired. To replace him, Mendonça appointed journalist Augusto Nunes, who had presented the program in the 1980s.

In September 2013, he became a columnist for the second section of the Rio newspaper O Globo. The following year, he made a gaffe that was published in the Folha de S. Paulo newspaper and in O Globo. On a flight between Rio de Janeiro and São Paulo, Conti met Vladimir Palomo, a lookalike of the then coach of the Brazilian national football team, Luiz Felipe Scolari. The interview was published as an exclusive on the newspapers' digital portals. Shortly afterwards, the editors issued an errata after it was discovered that the interview had been given by a look-alike. Also in 2014, he debuted the interview program Diálogos com Mario Sérgio Conti, aired on GloboNews, the subscription TV channel of the Globo group, where he interviews politicians, artists and intellectuals. The first interviewee was Cesare Battisti, a former member of the Armed Proletarians for Communism (PAC), a far-left militant group that committed illegal acts in Italy, who was living in Brazil and was denied extradition by then president Luiz Inácio Lula da Silva (PT). In 2024, the program celebrated ten years on the air.

In 2015, he got a weekly column in Folha de S. Paulo. In 2022, Companhia das Letras published his translation of the first volume of Marcel Proust's In Search of Lost Time.

== Personal life ==
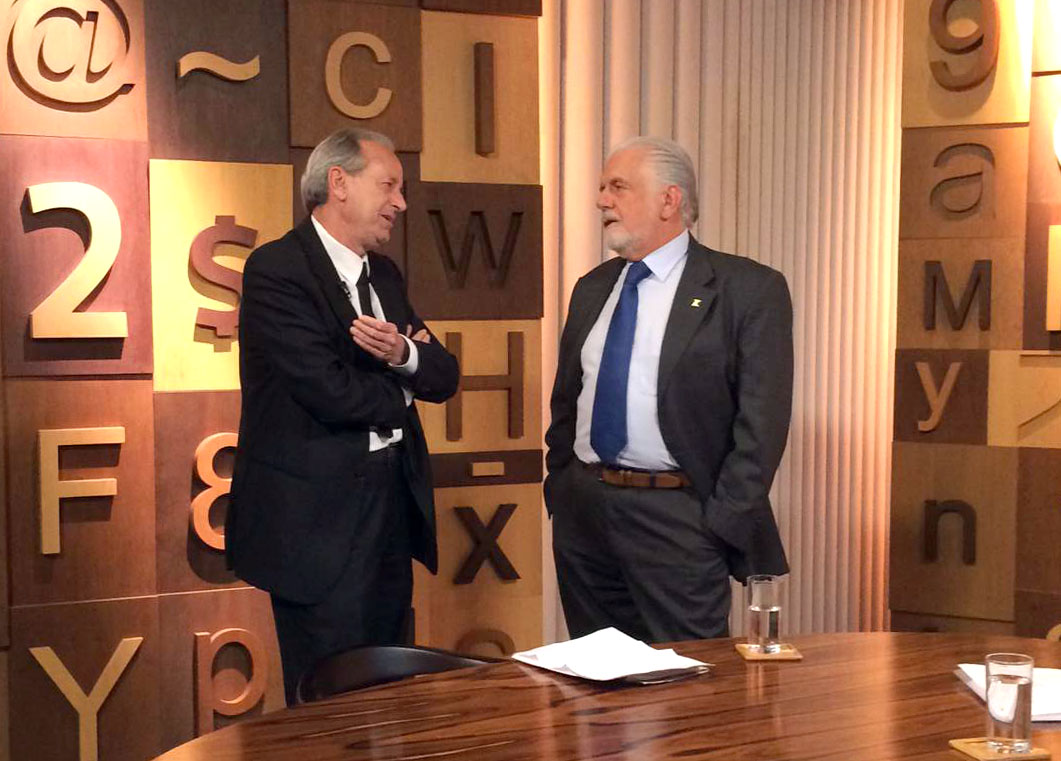
Conti (left) with politician Jaques Wagner in the Diálogos program.

Of Italian and French descent, he is the father of four children: filmmaker Carol, editor André, veterinarian Luisa and Lina, who studied sociology and philosophy in Bologna, Italy.

=== Religious views ===
In May 2024, he declared himself an atheist in his Folha column, stating that “the idea of God persists because in the consumer society billions do not consume. Religions fulfill the function of giving imaginary relief to those who don't have it in real, material life". On Easter 2021, he had already released a provocative text in which he noted: “Blessed are those who believe in Christ as children believe in the Easter bunny: as a joke, from time to time, until the age of seven.”

== Works ==
=== Books ===
- Notícias do Planalto: a imprensa e Fernando Collor. São Paulo: Companhia das Letras, 1999.
- Eles Foram para Petrópolis: uma Correspondência Virtual na Virada do Século (with Ivan Lessa). São Paulo: Companhia das Letras, 2009.

=== Translation ===
- In Search of Lost Time by Marcel Proust. São Paulo: Companhia das Letras, 2022.
