= Revista Oeste =

Political News Media

- Owner: Editora Tipuana
- Founder(s): Jairo Leal, Augusto Nunes and Jose Roberto Guzzo
- Founded: March 27, 2020
- Language: Portuguese
- Country: Brazil
- Website: www.revistaoeste.com

Revista Oeste is a Brazilian weekly digital magazine founded on March 27, 2020, by Jairo Leal, Augusto Nunes, and José Roberto Guzzo. It focuses on political journalism, with an editorial line aligned to the right, advocating positions such as social conservatism and economic liberalism.

== History ==
The Revista Oeste was founded on March 27, 2020, by journalists Jairo Leal, Augusto Nunes, and José Roberto Guzzo. The publication focuses on political reporting, with an editorial line aligned with the Brazilian political right, social conservatism, and economic liberalism. On August 19, 2020, journalist Silvio Navarro, previously associated with Veja and Jovem Pan, joined the magazine as executive editor.

On November 23, 2022, Oeste launched the program Oeste sem Filtro Broadcast live from Monday to Friday, the show became one of the outlet’s main audiovisual productions and reportedly surpassed the audience of Os Pingos nos Is aired by Jovem Pan, on several occasions.

On January 12, 2023, Revista Oeste's YouTube channel was demonetized after YouTube determined that some of its content did not comply with the platform's monetization policies. The publication challenged the decision in court. Following the demonetization, the magazine stated that subscription revenue remained an important source of funding. On January 30, 2023, the publication entered into a partnership agreement with Rádio Estúdio 92.3 FM in Cascavel, Paraná, allowing Oeste Sem Filtro to be rebroadcast daily on the station.

Beginning on July 27, 2024, part of Oeste’s programming, including Oeste Sem Filtro, started airing on the satellite channel TVD News, expanding the magazine’s television reach. In October 2024, the magazine became a finalist in the Most Admired Journalists award in the Economics, Business and Finance press category, with Amanda Sampaio, Carlo Cauti and Luís Artur Nogueira among the nominees.

On February 27, 2025, Oeste announced the hiring of sports journalist Milton Neves, known for his work with broadcasters including Jovem Pan and Rádio Bandeirantes. Later that year, on June 18, the outlet announced plans to launch a 24-hour television news channel named Oeste TV. The project was revealed during an edition of Oeste Sem Filtro, which was also carried by TVD News. On August 2, 2025, the magazine reported the death of journalist J. R. Guzzo, one of its founders, at the age of 82 following a heart attack. On August 18, 2025, Oeste launched its first sports program, Esporte Sem Firula, hosted by Milton Neves on YouTube. Concurrently, the magazine relocated its headquarters to a new address featuring three studios dedicated to its programming—an initiative tied to the upcoming launch of Oeste TV, the magazine's own television channel. Also in August 2025, the radio station Conecta 107.9 FM, based in Rondônia, announced that it would begin rebroadcasting Oeste Sem Filtro, marking the group’s first broadcasting partnership in the state. On December 9, 2025, Silvio Navarro left the publication after more than five years working on programs such as Oeste Sem Filtro and Arena Oeste. The reasons for his departure were not publicly disclosed. On December 10, 2025, Rádio AuriVerde ended its partnership with Revista Oeste, causing Oeste Sem Filtro to cease transmission on 97.5 FM in Bauru and neighboring areas.

On January 26, 2026, Oeste officially launched Oeste TV, a subscription television channel initially made available on Vivo TV channel 608.

=== Censorship and misinformation ===
The magazine has also been the target of lawsuits and attempts at censorship, which they consider attacks on press freedom. In 2022, by consensus decision, Revista Oeste was classified as an unreliable source on the Portuguese Wikipedia. Sometimes involved in controversies, the magazine is pointed out by critics as a vehicle for the dissemination of fake news, an allegation that Revista Oeste and its followers contest.
