= Guzzi =

Guzzi is a surname. Notable people with the surname include:

- Paolo Guzzi, (born 1940), Italian poet and critic
- Paul Guzzi (born 1942), American businessman and former Massachusetts Secretary of the Commonwealth

== See also ==
- Guzzo (disambiguation)
- Moto Guzzi, Italian motorcycle manufacturer
