= Judge West =

Judge West may refer to:

- Caleb Walton West (1844–1909), municipal judge in Kentucky
- DuVal West (1861–1949), judge of the United States District Court for the Western District of Texas
- Elmer Gordon West (1914–1992), judge of the United States District Courts for the Eastern and Middle Districts of Louisiana
- Lee Roy West (1929–2020), judge of the United States District Court for the Western District of Oklahoma
- Roger Blake West (1928–1978), judge of the United States District Court for the Eastern District of Louisiana
- Samuel H. West (1872–1938), judge of the United States District Court for the Northern District of Ohio

== See also ==
- Justice West (disambiguation)
