= Oeste =

Oeste is the Portuguese and Spanish word for west. The term may refer to:

== Geography ==
- Õeste, a village in Leisi Parish, county of Saare, Estonia
- Oeste (intermunicipal community), Portugal, an administrative region and a NUTS III subregion

== Other uses ==
- Oeste Futebol Clube, an association football team in the State of São Paulo, Brazil
- Oeste TV, a television channel based in the city of São Paulo, in the state of the same name

== See also ==
- West (disambiguation)
