= List of programs broadcast by GloboNews =

This is a list of programs currently and soon to be broadcast by Globo News, the news channel of the Brazilian network Globo.

== Current programming ==
=== Newscasts ===
| Title | Main Hosts |
|---|---|
| Jornal GloboNews - Edição da Meia-Noite | Marcelly Setúbal |
| Jornal GloboNews | Marcelly Setúbal |
| GloboNews em Ponto | Mônica Waldvogel; Victor Boyjadian |
| Conexão GloboNews | Narayanna Borges; Rafael Colombo |
| GloboNews Mais | Julia Duailibi |
| Jornal GloboNews - Edição das 18h | Natuza Nery |
| GloboNews em Pauta | Marcelo Cosme |
| Jornal das Dez | Aline Midlej |
| Especial de Domingo | Elisabete Pacheco |
| GloboNews Radar | Camila Bomfim |
| Jornal GloboNews - Edição das 03h | Rotation of presenters |
| Jornal GloboNews - Edição das 06h | Rotation of presenters |
| Jornal GloboNews - Edição das 07h | Rotation of presenters |
| Jornal GloboNews - Edição das 08h | Rotation of presenters |
| Jornal GloboNews - Edição das 10h | Rotation of presenters |
| Jornal GloboNews - Edição do Meio-Dia | Rotation of presenters |
| Jornal GloboNews - Edição das 15h | Rotation of presenters |
| Jornal GloboNews - Edição das 17h | Rotation of presenters |
| Jornal GloboNews - Edição das 20h | Rotation of presenters |

==== News features ====
- Cidades e Soluções

=== Talk shows ===
| Title | Main Hosts |
|---|---|
| Estúdio i | Andréia Sadi |
| Central GloboNews | Natuza Nery |
| GloboNews Fernando Gabeira | Fernando Gabeira |
| GloboNews Miriam Leitão | Miriam Leitão |
| GloboNews Internacional | Marcelo Lins e Guga Chacra |
| Diálogos com Mario Sérgio Conti | Mario Sérgio Conti |
| GloboNews Roberto D'Ávila | Roberto D'Ávila |

=== Archive programming and specials ===
- GloboNews Documentário
- Globo News Especial

=== Repeats of TV Globo's shows ===
- Fantástico
- Globo Repórter
- Globo Rural
- Conversa com Bial
- Pequenas Empresas & Grandes Negócios

== Defunct programming ==
- Almanaque
- Arquivo N
- Atividade
- Boletim de Notícias
- Central das Eleições
- Em Cima da Hora
- Em Cima da Hora - Edição das 10:00
- Em Cima da Hora - Edição das Seis
- Em Foco com Andréia Sadi
- Entrevista Especial
- Espaço Aberto
- Espaço GloboNews
- GloboNews Alexandre Garcia
- GloboNews Painel
- Jornal GloboNews - Edição de 01h
- Jornal GloboNews - Edição das 02h
- Jornal GloboNews - Edição das 04h
- Jornal GloboNews - Edição das 05h
- Jornal GloboNews - Edição das 09h
- Jornal GloboNews - Edição das 11h
- Jornal GloboNews - Edição das 13h
- Jornal GloboNews - Edição das 14h
- Jornal GloboNews - Edição das 16h
- Jornal GloboNews - Edição das 19h
- Jornal GloboNews - Edição das 21h
- Manhattan Connection
- Mundo S/A
- Navegador
- N de Notícia
- Ofício em Cena
- Pelo Mundo
- Plano Geral
- Review
- Sarau
- Starte
- Tempo e Temperatura
- Via Brasil

== See also ==
- List of programs broadcast by TV Globo
