= The Westerner =

A Westerner is a person from the Western world.

The Westerner may also refer to:

== Arts and entertainment ==
- The Westerners, a 1919 American film directed by Edward Sloman
- The Westerner (1934 film), an American western starring Tim McCoy
- The Westerner (1940 film), an American western starring Gary Cooper and Walter Brennan
- The Westerner (TV series), a 1960 show created by Sam Peckinpah
- The Westerner (video game), a 2004 PC game published by Focus Home Interactive
- The Westerner, a 1907 play by Anthony E. Wills

== Other uses ==
- The Westerner, successor to The West Coast Miner newspaper in Tasmania

== See also ==
- Westerner (disambiguation)
