= Oeste TV =

Brazilian multi-platform news channel

- Type: News channel; FAST; Streaming television; Pay television
- Country: Brazil
- Broadcast area: Brazil; United States; Canada; YouTube (Worldwide)
- Headquarters: Avenida Paulista, Bela Vista, São Paulo

Programming
- Language: Brazilian Portuguese
- Picture format: 1080i (HDTV)

Ownership
- Owner: Revista Oeste
- Parent: Editora Tipuana Ltda
- Key people: Jairo Leal (managing partner)

History
- Launched: January 26, 2026; 9 months ago

Availability

Streaming media
- Oeste Videos: Live Stream
- YouTube: Live Stream

Oeste TV is a Brazilian multi-platform news channel based in São Paulo, the capital of the state of the same name, owned by Editora Tipuana Ltda., which also publishes Revista Oeste. Its programming includes news programs, interviews, debates, and political and economic analysis.

== History ==
Oeste TV was developed as a television project associated with Revista Oeste, a Brazilian digital publication founded in March 27, 2020. Over time, the publication expanded its activities beyond written content to include audiovisual programming distributed online platforms, radio partnerships, and satellite television. On July 27, 2024, part of Revista Oeste's programming, including the program Oeste Sem Filtro, began to be carried on the TVD News satellite channel, increasing its distribution through television platforms.

On June 18, 2025, Revista Oeste announced the creation of Oeste TV, described as a 24-hour cable news channel. The channel was launched on January 26, 2026, as a subscription television service, initially becoming available on Vivo TV (channel 608). On March 10, 2026, the channel was added to the NX Play catalog, a streaming and pay television service. On March 21, 2026, Oeste TV became available on channel 90.5 of the Multimídia TV operator (pay TV and fiber optic broadband) in Jandira (SP), Santos Dumont (MG) and in the West Zone of Rio de Janeiro (RJ). On April 8, 2026, Oeste TV was added to the Samsung TV Plus platform, where it became available on channel 2045. On April 23, 2026, the broadcaster became part of the CDNTV lineup, a digital television and streaming platform, operating on channel 171. On May 5, 2026, the channel was added to Oi TV (channel 215). On May 15, 2026, Oeste TV became available on SóPlay, a Brazilian video streaming application that offers free content in high definition. In May 2026, Oeste TV began being broadcast in the United States and Canada through UVOtv (a free ad-supported linear streaming platform based in New York), occupying channel 6 on the platform.

== Programming ==
Oeste TV's programming consists primarily of news programs, interviews, debates, political and economic analysis, as well as sports- and agribusiness-related content. Part of the channel's programming originated from content previously produced by Revista Oeste for digital platforms and internet broadcasts.

Programs broadcast by the channel include Jornal da Oeste, divided into two weekday editions; Oeste com Elas; Arena Oeste; Oeste Sem Filtro, aired since 2022; Esporte Sem Firula; A Força do Agro; Faroeste à Brasileira, launched in 2024; and A Palavra Final.

On weekdays, the channel's schedule includes Jornal da Oeste – Primeira Edição from 7:00 a.m. to 10:00 a.m.; Oeste com Elas from 10:00 a.m. to 12:00 p.m.; Esporte Sem Firula from 12:00 p.m. to 2:00 p.m.; Faroeste à Brasileira from 2:00 p.m. to 4:00 p.m.; Jornal da Oeste – Segunda Edição from 4:00 p.m. to 5:45 p.m.; Oeste Sem Filtro from 5:45 p.m. to 7:50 p.m.; A Palavra Final from 7:50 p.m. to 8:00 p.m.; and A Força do Agro from 8:00 p.m. to 8:30 p.m.

Before the launch of Oeste TV in 2026, part of Revista Oeste's programming was rebroadcast by TVD News in 2024, including Oeste Sem Filtro.

The channel's programming includes live broadcasts, reruns, and productions made for television and digital platforms.

=== Programs ===
- Jornal da Oeste – Primeira Edição
- Oeste com Elas
- Esporte Sem Firula
- Faroeste à Brasileira
- Jornal da Oeste – Segunda Edição
- Oeste Sem Filtro
- A Palavra Final
- A Força do Agro
