= Western Suburbs =

Western Suburbs is a term used to refer to the western part of a city, or things associated with such a region. In particular, it may refer to

- Western Suburbs (Melbourne), encompassing the cities of Brimbank, Maribyrnong, Melton and Wyndham in Melbourne, Australia
- Western Suburbs (Mumbai), a region in Mumbai, India
- Western Suburbs (Perth), a group of suburbs of Perth, Western Australia
- Western Sydney, a region of Sydney, Australia

== Football clubs ==
=== Association (soccer) ===
- Western Suburbs SC, a VSL team in Melbourne, Australia
- Western Suburbs SC (NSW), a former NSL team in Sydney, Australia
- Western Suburbs FC, a football club in Porirua, New Zealand

=== Rugby league ===
- Western Suburbs Magpies, a NSWRL team in Sydney, Australia
- Western Suburbs Panthers, a QRL team in Brisbane, Australia
- Western Suburbs Red Devils, a rugby league team in Figtree, NSW
- Western Suburbs Rosellas, a rugby league team in Newcastle, NSW

=== Rugby union ===
- Western District RUFC (Wests Lions), a rugby union club in Canberra, Australia
- Western Suburbs District RUFC (West Harbour), a rugby union club in Sydney, Australia
- Western Suburbs RFC (Wellington), a rugby union club in Wellington, New Zealand
- Western Suburbs RUFC (Wests Bulldogs), a rugby union club in Brisbane, Queensland, Australia

== See also ==
- Wests (disambiguation)
