= Guzzo (surname) =

Guzzo (Italian pronunciation: [ˈɡuttso]) is an Italian surname. Notable people with the surname include:

- Alberto Breccia Guzzo (1946–2014), Uruguayan politician and lawyer
- Garry Guzzo (born 1941), Canadian politician
- Giovanni Guzzo (born 1986), Venezuelan violinist
- José Roberto Guzzo (1943–2025), Brazilian journalist
- Lou Guzzo (1919–2013), American journalist, author and television commentator
- Marco Guzzo (born 1994), Italian footballer
- Patsy Guzzo (1914–1993), Canadian ice hockey player, Olympic gold medalist
- Raphael Guzzo (born 1995), Portuguese footballer
- Vincenzo Guzzo (born 1969), Canadian entrepreneur
