= Daniela Lima (journalist) =

Brazilian journalist

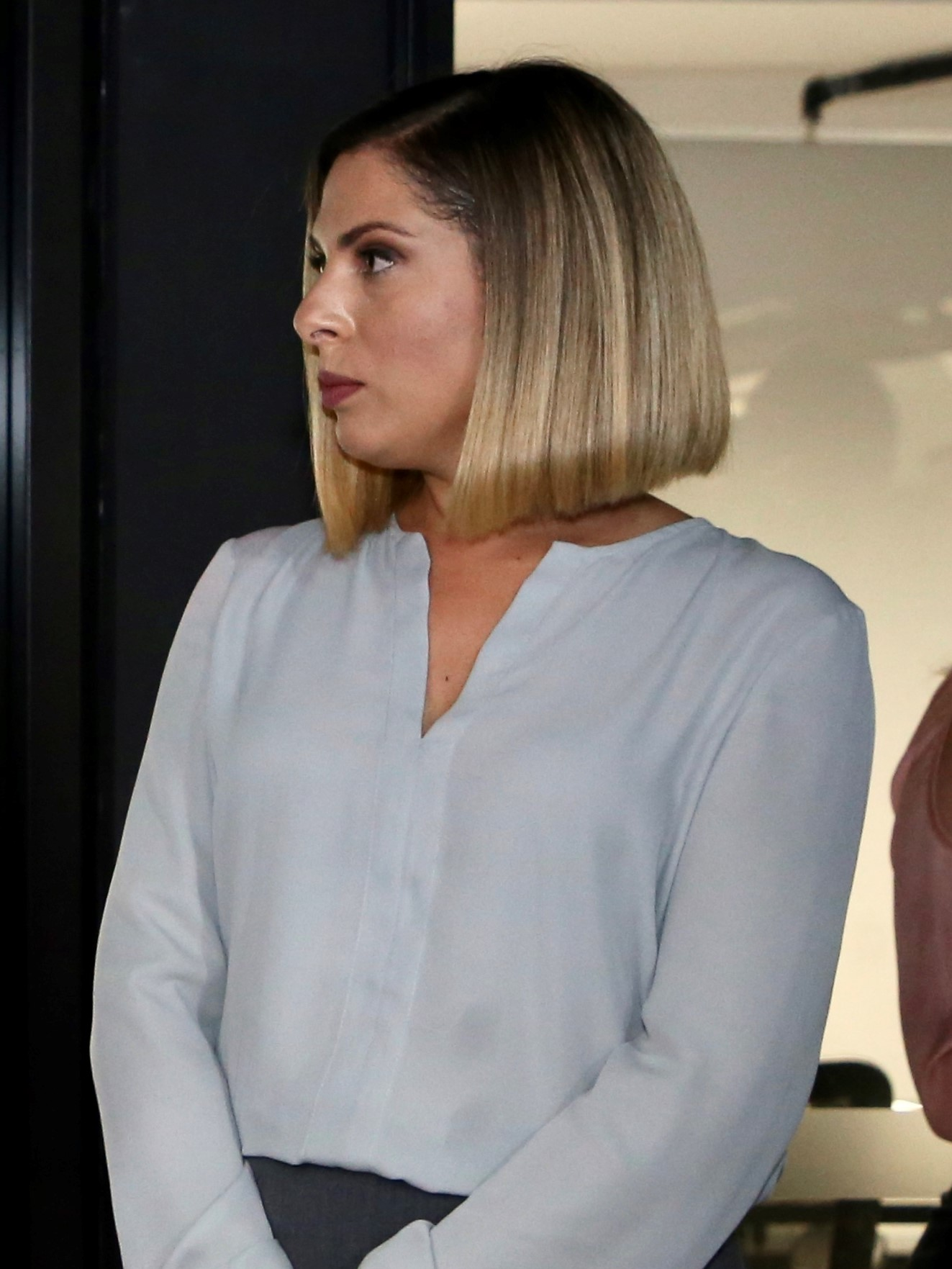
- Daniela Lima in 2023
- Born: July 17, 1985 (age 41); Brasília, Federal District, Brazil
- Citizenship: Brazilian
- Education: Centro Universitário de Brasília
- Occupations: journalist, podcaster
- Years active: 2003–present
- Employer: Universo Online
- Known for: Painel (Folha de S.Paulo)
- Television: Roda Viva, CNN 360°, Conexão GloboNews
- Title: anchor

Daniela Lima (17 July 1985) is a Brazilian television presenter, journalist and podcaster. She used to present the programme Roda Viva on TV Cultura.

== Biography ==
=== First years and education ===
Daniela Lima was born in Brasília, the capital of Brazil, in 1985, the daughter of civil servants. In the city, she graduated in Journalism from the Centro Universitário de Brasília (UniCeub) and began her career in 2003, whilst still at university, as an intern at Veja magazine.

=== Career ===
Daniela Lima joined Veja magazine as a reporter in 2006. In 2008, she worked as a reporter and political columnist for the Correio Braziliense newspaper. She joined Folha de S. Paulo in 2010, one of Brazil’s largest newspapers, where she established herself as one of the leading reporters on the ‘Poder’ section, covering the inner workings of national politics. In 2017, she was promoted to editor of the ‘Painel’ column, taking charge of one of the most influential sections in Brazilian political journalism.

In August 2019, she was hired by TV Cultura, where she presented the talk show Roda Viva, taking over from Ricardo Lessa. In December 2019, she resigned from TV Cultura and Folha de S.Paulo to join CNN Brasil. On the channel, she presented O Mundo Pós-Pandemia, the weekend news bulletins, but above all CNN 360°, an evening news programme focusing on political and economic news, which, under her leadership, became one of the channel’s most-watched programmes. On the programme, she even interviewed President Luiz Inácio Lula da Silva. She presented the news programme until 21 June 2023, and the following day announced her resignation. A few hours later, following the closure of CNN Brasil, it was announced that Daniela Lima had been hired by Grupo Globo. Until August 2025, she presented the programme Conexão GloboNews on GloboNews, a pay-TV news channel, until she was dismissed. According to journalist Gabriel Vaquer of the Folha de S. Paulo newspaper, it appears that Daniela’s dismissal followed an opinion poll conducted by the consultancy firm Quaest, which characterised the GloboNews channel and journalist Daniela as ‘a left-wing channel’, with the journalist’s image being one of the reasons for this. In an interview with writer Tati Bernardi, Daniela stated that, regarding the reasons given by the broadcaster, she had not received a detailed explanation, having been told only that the channel would be undergoing a ‘reorganisation’, something that happens from time to time. In September of that year, she made her debut as a columnist for the Universo Online (UOL) website, whilst also working for the group’s cable television channel, Canal UOL. In October of that year, she was hired by Transamérica Media Company (TMC) to work as a political commentator on the station’s programmes.

== Filmography ==
=== TV ===
| Year | Programme | Position | Broadcaster | Ref. |
|---|---|---|---|---|
| 2019–20 | Roda Viva | Presenter | TV Cultura | |
| 2020–23 | CNN 360° | Presenter | CNN Brasil | |
| 2020 | O Mundo Pós-Pandemia | Presenter | CNN Brasil | |
| 2023–2025 | Conexão GloboNews | Presenter | GloboNews | |

== Prizes ==
Lista de prêmios de Daniela Lima
| Year | Prize | Category | Work | Result | Ref. |
|---|---|---|---|---|---|
| 2019 | APCA Television Award | News programme | Roda Viva | Won | |
| 2021 | APCA Television Award | Highlights of the year | — | Nominated | |
