= James Templeton & Co =

James Templeton & Co was a Glasgow-based textile company that grew to become one of the leading carpet manufacturers in Britain during the 19th and 20th centuries.

== History ==
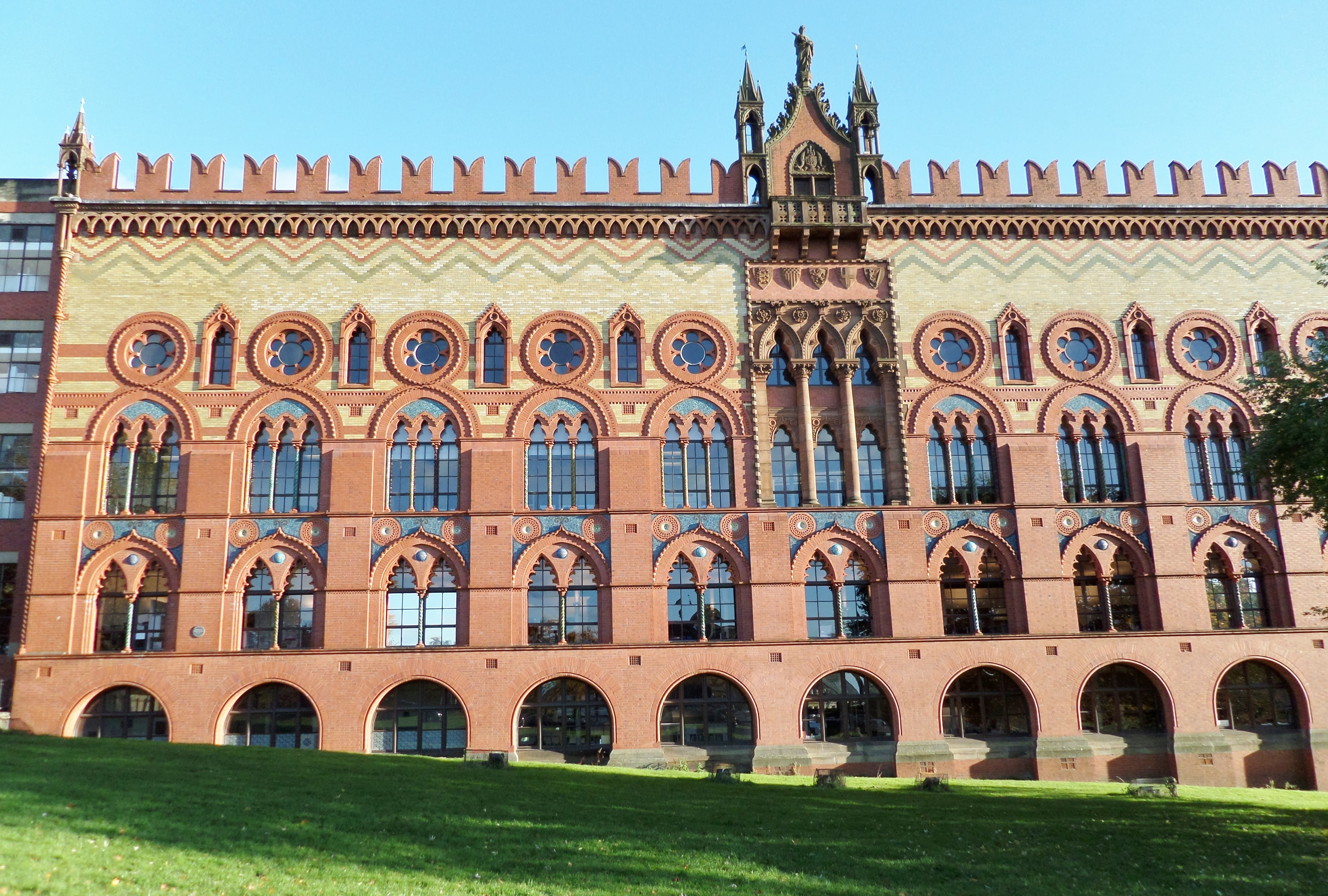
Templeton's Carpet Factory, Glasgow Green, Scotland

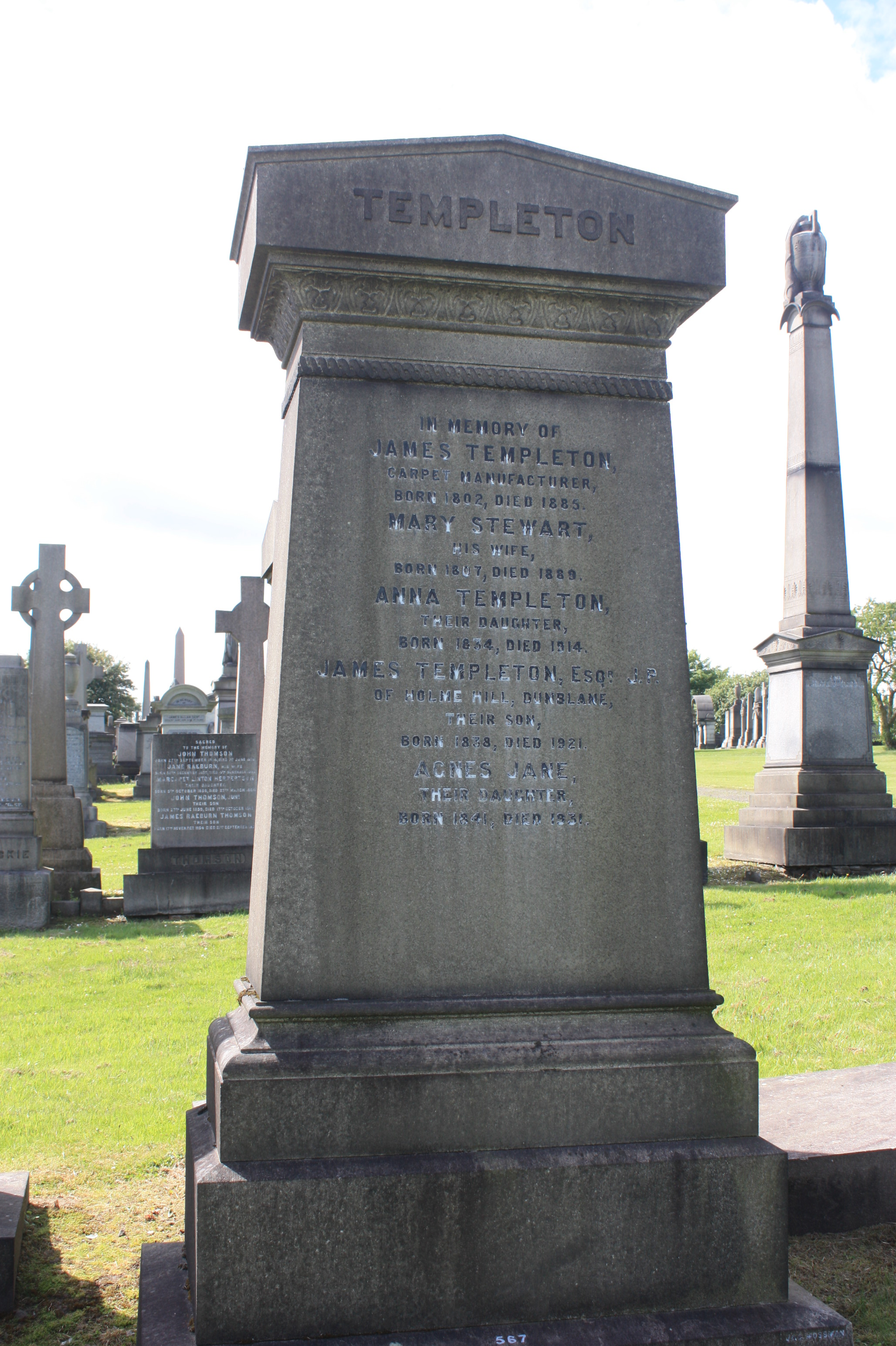
The grave of James Templeton, Glasgow Necropolis

James Templeton (1802-1885) was a farmer's son born in the Campbeltown area on 7 July 1802 the son of Archibald Templeton and his wife Ann Harvey.

Around 1820 he came to Glasgow to work in with a Mr Rose, a draper by trade. In 1823 he moved to Liverpool, and soon after he obtained a lucrative post in Mexico where he made enough money to return to Scotland and start his own business in 1826. In 1829 he opened a shawl manufactury in Paisley, as shawls were the new fashion. In 1837, through contact with another shawl manufacturer, William Quiglay, a new process was invented for processing chenille, a standard fabric for shawls, into compact C-shaped tufts which were both very soft and preserved their shape very well, enabling complex patterns to be created, and Templeton immediately saw this as ideal for carpet manufacture. Quiglay and Templeton took out a patent on this tufted carpet process, but only for 14 years.

The ensuing carpet firm of "James Templeton & Son" was established in Bridgeton in 1839. The original factory was on King Street (now called Redan Street) but burned down on Christmas Day 1856. In 1857 a new factory was built on William Street (later renamed Templeton Street). The factory specialised in "picture carpets", such as the Twelve Apostles Carpet which they exhibited at the Paris Exhibition of 1867.

John Stewart Templeton (1832-1918) and James Templeton Jr (1838-1921), the sons, took over the firm around 1865. Both father and son and the extended family lived in a large townhouse at 7 Woodside Crescent in the Kelvinside district.

James Templeton died in 1885 and is buried in the upper part of Glasgow Necropolis. His wife Mary Stewart and son James lie with him.

In 1889 a further carpet mill (originally called Albert Mill after Prince Albert) was built facing Glasgow Green, based on the Doge's Palace, Venice. This quickly became a much-loved local landmark.

On 1 November 1889 the wall of a partially completed 4 storey building collapsed, killing 29 women workers aged between 14 and 25.

The company also had its own recreational facilities in Rutherglen which are mostly now playing fields for the local high school, although the bowling club bearing the Templeton name at that location continues on its own.

In 1969, Templeton's bought a rival carpet firm, Grays, of Ayr, but their expansion brought about the demise of the firm. The company was bought by a British/Malaysian manufacturing and plantation group, the Guthrie Corporation, and briefly traded under the name of "British Carpets" but could not survive. In 1974 the company was renamed as "British Carpets Ltd" but the name continued to some extent.

At its peak, Templeton's Bridgeton factory employed 3000 people before closing in 1979.

In 1981, the rights to use the name "James Templeton & Co" were purchased by their former rivals, "Stoddard & Co" who had begun carpet production in 1864 and a new factory was built in Elderslie. The Glasgow Green factory building was converted by the Scottish Development Agency and became a business centre, Templeton On The Green, in 1984. In 1990, when Glasgow was the City of Culture for that year, the building featured on a UK postage stamp.
