= Ouest =

Ouest (French for west) may refer to:

- Ouest (department), Haiti
- Ouest Department (Ivory Coast), defunct administrative subdivision of Ivory Coast
- Ouest Province, Cameroon
- Ouest Province, Rwanda
- Ouest-France, a French newspaper
- West France (European Parliament constituency) (French: Ouest)
- Western Canada (French: Ouest du Canada)

== See also ==
- West (disambiguation)
