= West (poetry collection) =

2023 poetry collection by Paisley Rekdal

West: A Translation
- Author: Paisley Rekdal
- Publisher: Copper Canyon Press
- Publication date: May 2, 2023
- Pages: 176
- ISBN: 978-1556596568
- Preceded by: Appropriate: A Provocation

West: A Translation is a 2023 poetry collection by Paisley Rekdal, published by Copper Canyon Press. The book, along with its accompanying website, is a multimodal project about the transcontinental railroad in the United States and the broader history of Chinese Americans. Rekdal's 11th book, it was longlisted for the 2023 National Book Award for Poetry and won the 2024 Kingsley Tufts Poetry Award and the 34th Annual Reading the West Book Award in Poetry from the Mountains & Plains Independent Booksellers Association.

== Background ==
In 1869, the transcontinental railroad in the United States was completed, connecting both coasts of the country together. Countless Chinese American migrant workers participated in the construction of the rail project, mostly around the Sierra Nevada, in conditions that proved treacherous and fatal for many.

As the Poet Laureate of Utah in 2018, Rekdal was asked to write a poem about the railroad for its 150th anniversary. Instead, feeling a pressing need to address the gaps in the railroad's history, Rekdal endeavored to write a hybrid work of poems and essays that would become West: A Translation.

== Contents ==
In two sections—"West" and "Notes Toward an Untranslated Century"—the book tackles Chinese American history ranging from the transcontinental railroad to the Chinese Exclusion Act to the poetry of the Angel Island Immigration Station. In addition to prominently featuring the voices of those Rekdal considered underrepresented and dispossessed in the "archive" of history, it also features historical figures such as Brigham Young, Leland Stanford, Andrew Johnson, and countless others.

One issue Rekdal faced in putting together the book was the silence of the archive with regard to perspectives of the railroad which weren't well-documented or documented at all. Well-recorded perspectives allowed Rekdal more creative liberty in her poems, whereas scarcer materials meant Rekdal had to stay "extremely close to their stories, rhythms, diction, and pacing." In the Georgia Review, Rekdal stated:

"Interestingly, the environment and Chinese railroad workers share something in common when it comes to the history of the Transcontinental: the lack of a voice. No letters or written records authored by Chinese railroad workers have yet been discovered, so our understanding of the Chinese experience on the Transcontinental is essentially imaginative, and often imagined by white authors."

The book also comes with a website which provides visual poetry and further elaborates on the histories touched on by the book. Rekdal had created the website out of a desire to bring "images and text together so that people would have a multi-sensory experience." The website can be accessed online but also through a QR code on the book's back flap.

== Critical reception ==
In a starred review, Publishers Weekly concluded: "Through these poems, readers are asked to wrestle with the complex, layered histories of race, creed, class, and gender that are all too often overlooked in monolithic presentations of America's past and present. Elegiac and shot through with righteous anger, this essential collection demands a national reckoning."

Critics lauded Rekdal's multimodal approach to an often forgotten and overlooked history. The Poetry Foundation called the book "gorgeously designed". Los Angeles Review of Books said "West is a book of ghosts—not the white-sheeted apparitions of the popular imagination but specters of the past that flicker imperceptibly in the present, shaping our lives in ways we cannot grapple with until we recognize them." International Examiner stated that "The first half of West: A Translation is fascinating in showing the power of poetry and archival work as well as Rekdal's prowess as a poet ... The second half is difficult to read but perhaps the difficulty is the point, how impressive and pressing can be the same, two halves of the same baggage." Good River Review wrote, of the book, that "Astonishing in scope and intelligence, its ambitions are as vast as the nineteenth-century frontier and the dreams for American empire."
