= Guzzo =

Guzzo may refer to:

- Cinémas Guzzo, a theatre chain in Canada
- 34716 Guzzo, an asteroid in the Main Asteroid Belt of the Solar System
- Sergeant Guzzo, a character in Call of Duty 2: Big Red One and Call of Duty 3
- Guzzo (surname), a surname of Italian origin
