= Diálogos com Mario Sergio Conti =

Brazilian talk show hosted by Mario Sergio Conti, which premiered in 2014 on GloboNews

- Genre: Talk show
- Presented by: Mario Sergio Conti
- Country of origin: Brazil
- Original language: Portuguese
- No. of seasons: 12

Original release
- Network: GloboNews
- Release: April 10, 2014 – present

Diálogos com Mario Sergio Conti is a Brazilian talk show hosted by journalist Mario Sergio Conti and broadcast on GloboNews since April 10, 2014.

== History ==
The program was created to be a standout among the talk shows on the Brazilian pay-TV channel GloboNews, according to Eugenia Moreyra, the channel’s director. The talk show premiered on April 10, 2014, with journalist Mario Sergio Conti serving as the host. In an interview with journalist Mauricio Stycer of the Universo Online website, he stated that the American talk show model, which is replicated on Brazilian broadcast TV, is out of the question. “The writers even write the jokes that the guests tell.” After leaving the panel of the program Roda Viva, which he hosted for over two years, he said that his inspiration for hosting the format would be Piers Morgan and David Pujadas.

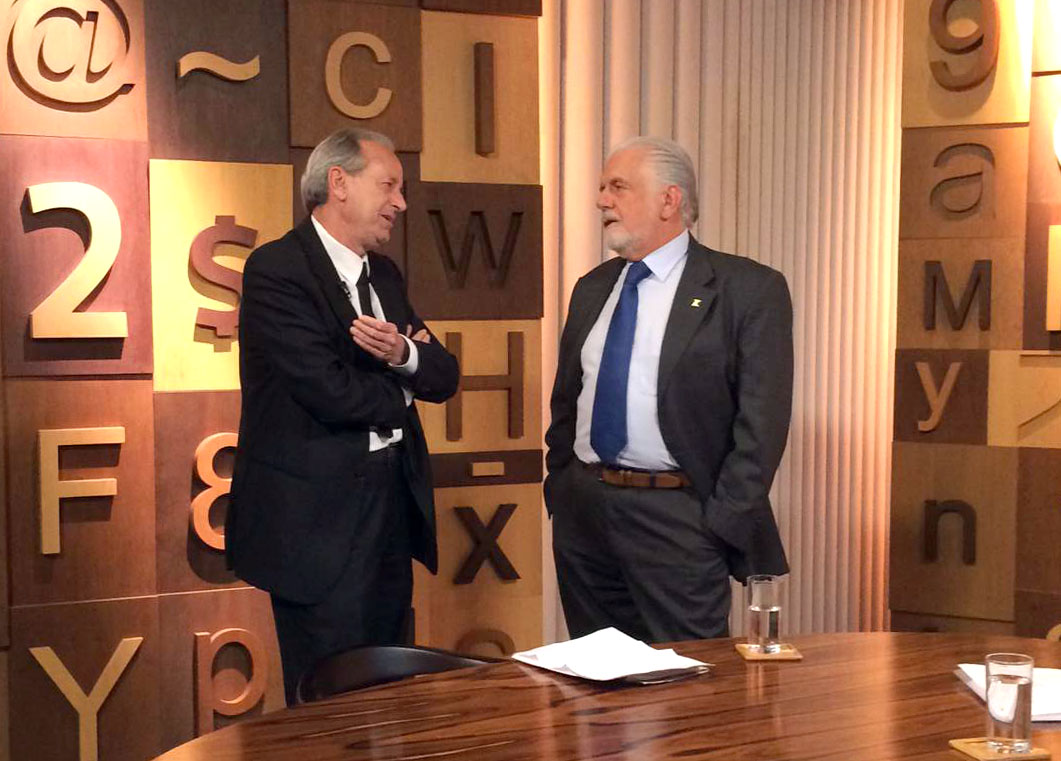
Conti (left) with politician Jaques Wagner in the Diálogos program.

The program's first guest was Italian activist Cesare Battisti, marking his first interview on a Brazilian television program. Prominent figures have appeared as guests on the show, including politicians such as Fernando Haddad, Jaques Wagner, Fernando Henrique Cardoso, Tarso Genro Jean Wyllys, and Rubens Ricupero, the French writers Édouard Louis and Bernard-Henri Lévy, the philosopher José Arthur Giannotti, the actors Gregorio Duvivier and Othon Bastos, and the historian Boris Fausto. The president of Wikimedia Brasil, Érica Azzelini, was also interviewed.

To celebrate the station’s 25th anniversary in 2021, the interview with Battisti was rebroadcast as a special feature in the series Grandes Entrevistas (Note: A loose translation into English, Great Interviews.), which selected the channel’s best interviews from that era.
