= Chenille fabric =

Type of yarn and the fabric made of it

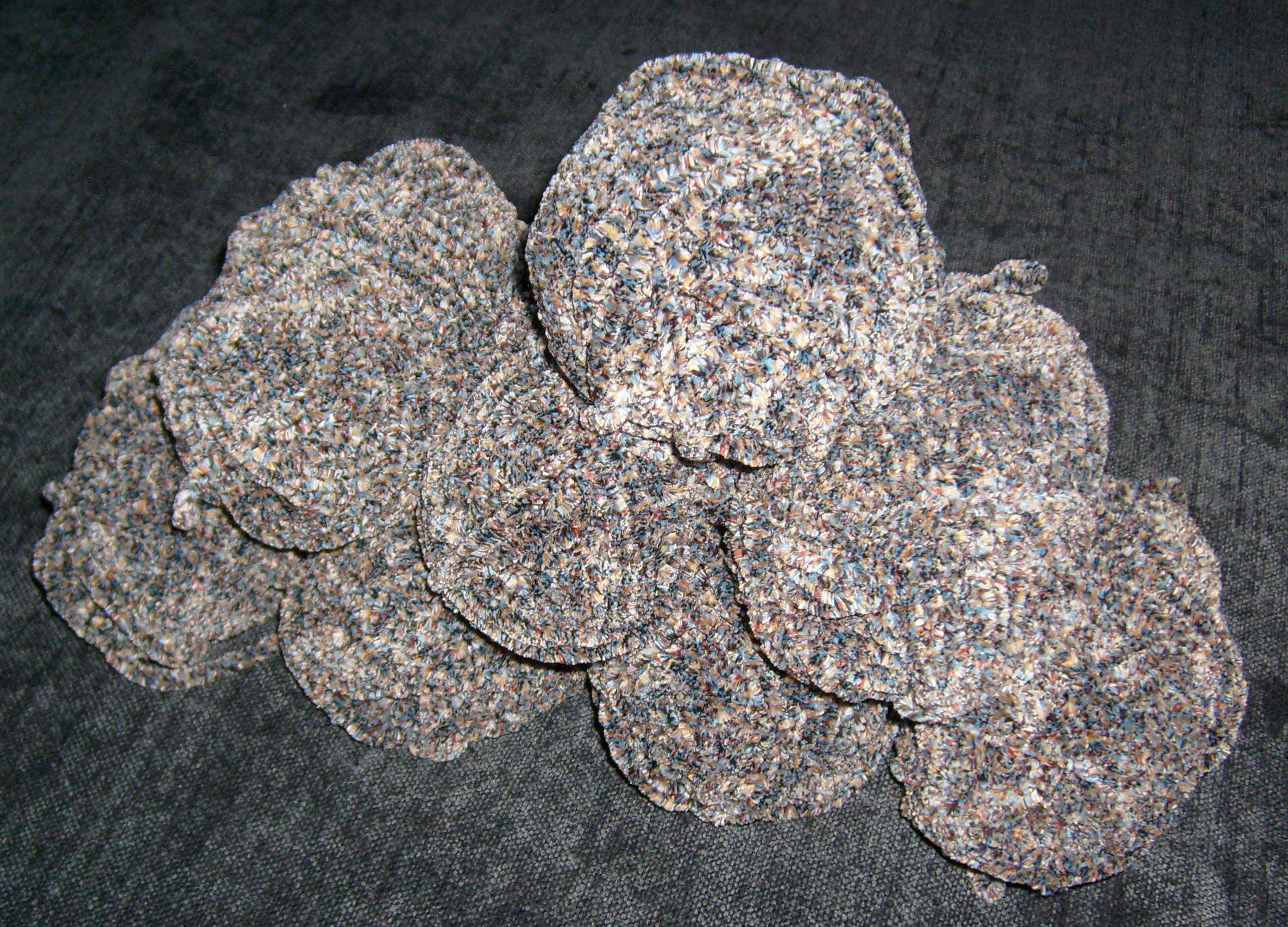
Chenille yarn

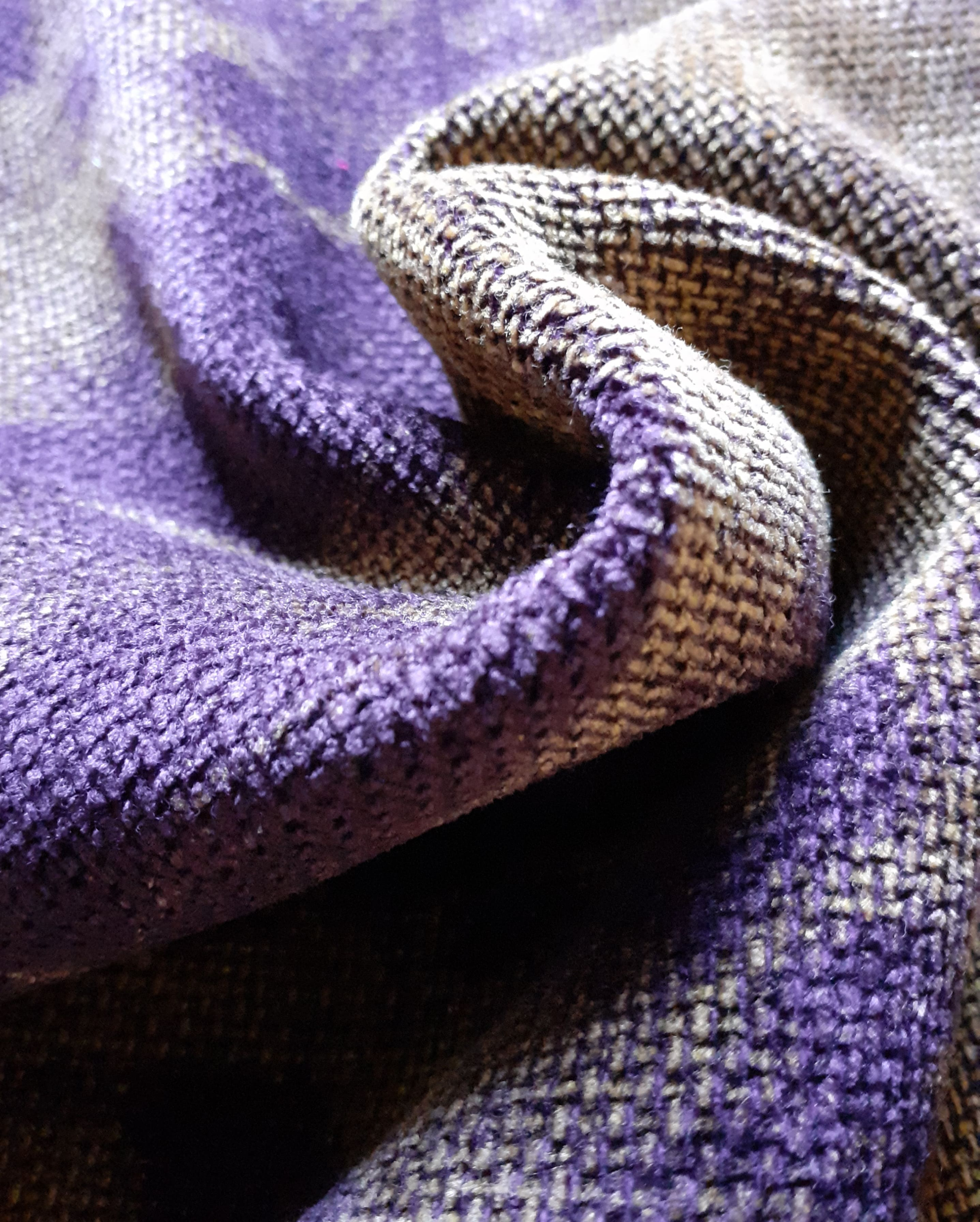
Chenille fabric

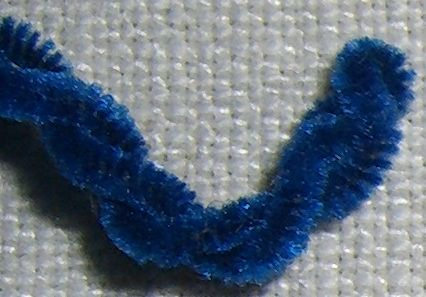
Chenille yarn

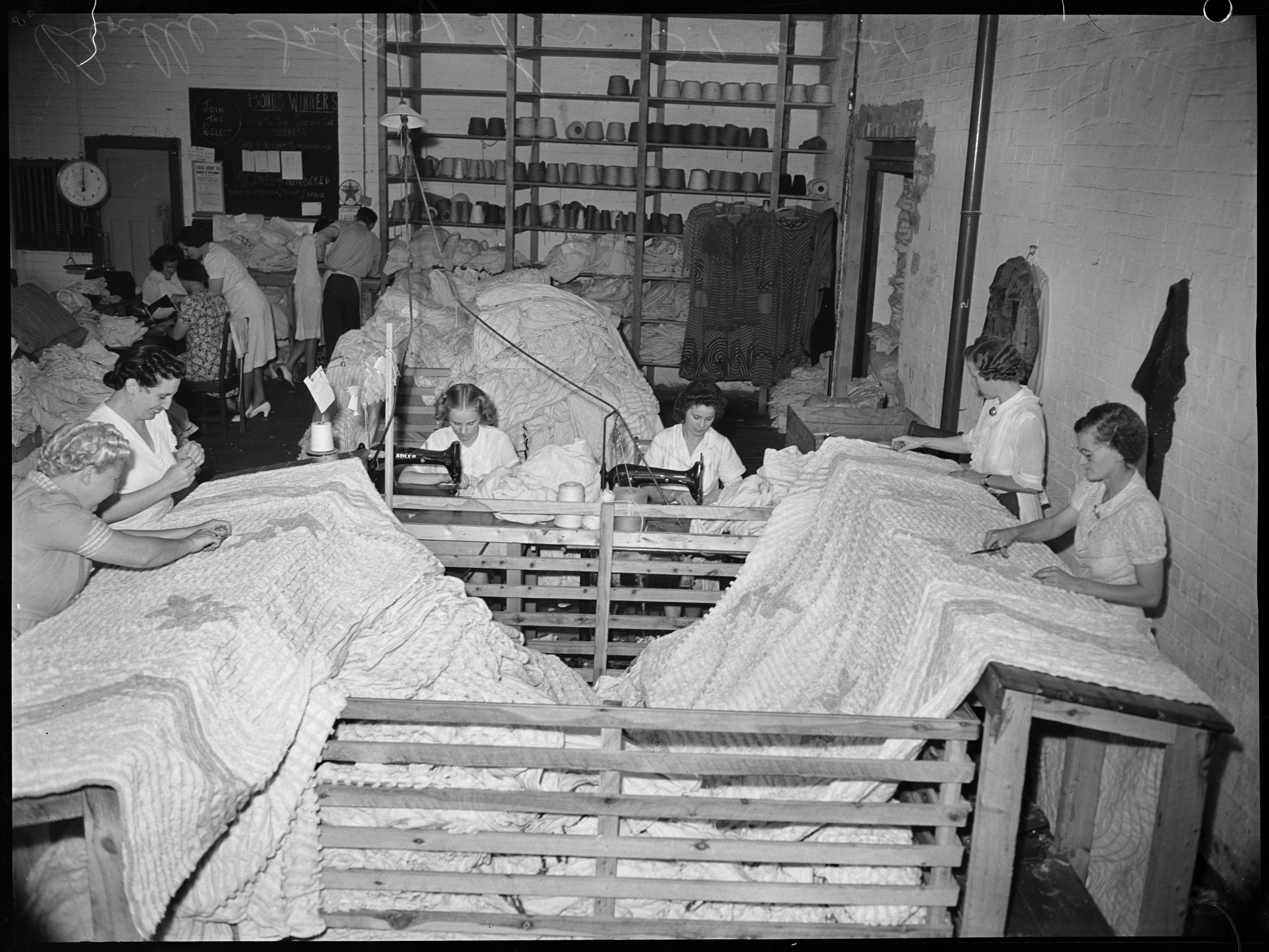
Workers at the Pacific Chenille Craft Co., Sydney, 1941

Chenille (French pronunciation: [ʃənij(ə)]) is a type of yarn, or the fabric made from it. Chenille is the French word for caterpillar, whose fur the yarn is supposed to resemble.

== History ==
According to textile historians, chenille-type yarn is a relatively recent invention, dating to the 18th century and believed to have originated in France. The original technique involved weaving a "leno" fabric and then cutting the fabric into strips to make the chenille yarn.

Alexander Buchanan, a foreman in a Paisley fabric mill, is credited with introducing chenille fabric to Scotland in the 1830s. Here he developed a way to weave fuzzy shawls. Tufts of coloured wool were woven together into a blanket that was then cut into strips. They were treated by heating rollers in order to create the frizz. This resulted in a very soft, fuzzy fabric named chenille. Another Paisley shawl manufacturer went on to further develop the technique. James Templeton and William Quiglay worked to refine this process while working on imitation oriental rugs.

The intricate patterns used to be difficult to reproduce by automation, but this technique solved that issue. These men patented the process but Quiglay soon sold out his interest. Templeton then went on to open a successful carpet company, James Templeton & Co, that became a leading carpet manufacturer throughout the 19th and 20th centuries.

In the 1920s and 1930s, Dalton in Northwest Georgia became the tufted bedspread capital of the US thanks to Catherine Evans (later adding Whitener) who initially revived the handcraft technique in the 1890s. Hand-tufted bedspreads with an embroidered appearance became increasingly popular and were referred to as "chenille", a term which stuck. With effective marketing, chenille bedspreads appeared in city department stores and tufting subsequently became important to the economic development of North Georgia, maintaining families even through the Depression era. Merchants organised "spread houses" where products tufted on farms were finished using heat washing to shrink and "set" the fabric. Trucks delivered pattern-stamped sheets and dyed chenille yarns to families for tufting, then returned to pay the tufters and collect the spreads for finishing. By this time, tufters all over the state were creating not only bedspreads but pillow shams and mats, and selling them by the highway. Dalton County native B. J. Bandy made a million dollars in the bedspread business with the help of his wife, Dicksie Bradley Bandy, by the late 1930s; he was the first, and was followed by many others.

In the 1930s, usage for the tufted fabric became widely desirable for throws, mats, bedspreads, and carpets, but not, as yet, apparel. Companies shifted handwork from the farms into factories for greater control and productivity, encouraged to pursue centralized production by the wage and hour provisions of the National Recovery Administration's tufted bedspread code. With the trend towards mechanization, adapted sewing machines were used to insert raised yarn tufts.

Chenille became popular for apparel with commercial production in the 1970s.

Standards of industrial production were not introduced until the 1990s, when the Chenille International Manufacturers Association (CIMA) was formed with the mission to improve and develop the manufacturing processes. From the 1970s each machine head made two chenille yarns straight onto bobbins; a machine could have over 50 heads with 100 spindles. Giesse was one of the first major machine manufacturers. Giesse acquired Iteco company in 2010, integrating the chenille yarn electronic quality control directly on their machine. Chenille fabrics are also often used in letterman jackets, also known as "varsity jackets" due to the letter patches.

== Description ==
The chenille yarn is manufactured by placing short lengths of yarn, called the "pile", between two "core yarns" and then twisting the yarn together. The edges of these piles then stand at right angles to the yarn's core, giving chenille both its softness and its characteristic look. Chenille will look different in one direction compared to another, as the fibers catch the light differently. Chenille can appear iridescent without actually using iridescent fibers. The yarn is commonly manufactured from cotton, but can also be made using acrylic, rayon and olefin.

=== Improvements ===
One of the problems with chenille yarns is that the tufts can work loose, leaving bare fabric. This was resolved by using a low-melt nylon in the core of the yarn, then autoclaving (steaming) the hanks of yarn to set the pile in place.

== In quilting ==
Since the late 1990s, chenille appeared in quilting in a number of yarns, yards or finishes. As a yarn, it is a soft, feathery synthetic that when stitched onto a backing fabric, gives a velvety appearance, also known as imitation or "faux chenille". Real chenille quilts are made using patches of chenille fabric in various patterns and colors, with or without "ragging" the seams.

The chenille effect by ragging the seams has been adapted by quilters for a casual country look. A quilt with a so-called "chenille finish" is known as a "rag quilt" or "slash quilt" due to the frayed exposed seams of the patches and the method of achieving this. Layers of soft cotton are batted together in patches or blocks and sewn with wide, raw edges to the front. These edges are then cut, or slashed, to create a worn, soft, "chenille" effect.

== Care ==
Many chenille fabrics should be dry cleaned. If hand or machine-washed, they should be machine-dried using low heat, or as a heavy textile, dried flat to avoid stretching, never hung.

In the case of chenille sofa coverings, spot cleaning is recommended, as the fabric should not be put in a washing machine.
