= Western (surname) =

Western is a surname. Notable people with the surname include:

- Albert Western (1923–1987), Australian rules footballer
- Andrew Western (born 1985), British politician
- Anne Western (born 1955), English politician
- Bruce Western (born 1964), Australian-born American sociologist
- Cyrus Western, American politician
- Edward Western (1845–1919), English cricketer
- Franklin Western (born 1972), basketball player
- Frederick Western (1880–1951), Anglican bishop
- Joel Western (born 2002), Australian rules footballer
- John Western (1931–2011), Australian academic and author
- Johnny Western (born 1934), American country singer-songwriter
- Jon Western (1963–2022), American political scholar
- Lucille Western (1843–1877), American stage actress
- Matt Western (born 1962), British politician
- Mike Western (1925–2008), British comics artist
- Phil Western (1971–2019), Canadian musician
- Samuel Western (1652–1699), English politician
- Thomas Western, several people
