= Poet Laureate of Utah =

- Incumbent; Lisa Bickmore since 2022
- Type: Poet laureate
- Formation: 1997
- First holder: David Lee

The poet laureate of Utah is the poet laureate for the U.S. state of Utah. The Utah State Poet Laureate Program was established in 1997. As a joint project of the governor's office and the Utah Arts Council Literature Program, the governor appoints the Utah poet laureate for a five-year term.

== List of poets laureate ==
- David Lee (1997–2003)
- Ken Brewer (2003–2006)
- Katharine Coles (2006–2012)
- Lance Larsen (2012 – 2017)
- Paisley Rekdal (2017–2022)
- Lisa Bickmore (2022–present)

== See also ==
- Poet laureate
- List of U.S. state poets laureate
- United States Poet Laureate
