= Templeton On The Green =

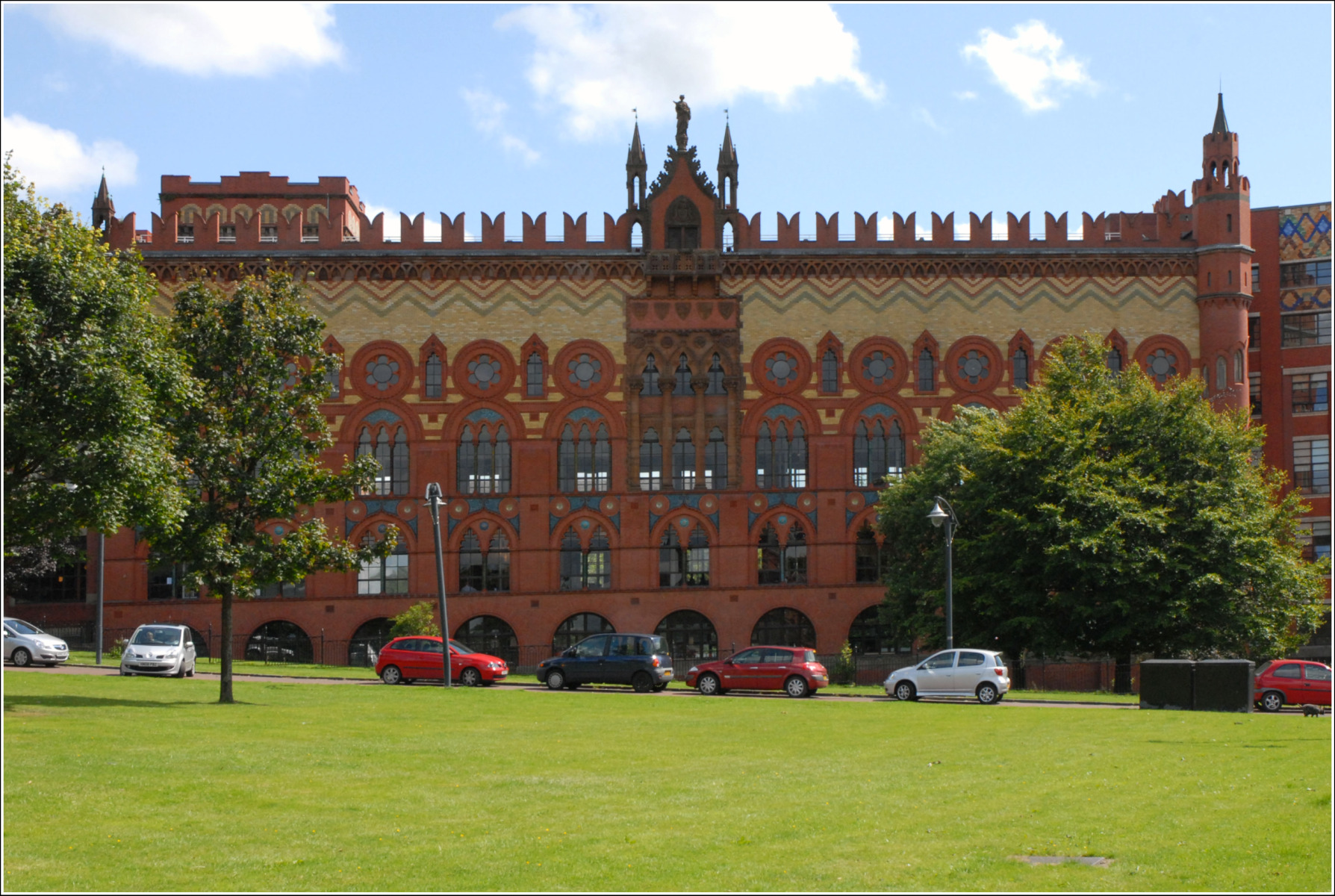
- Interactive map of the Templeton On The Green area
- Former names: Templeton Carpet Factory

General information
- Architectural style: Victorian Gothic
- Location: Scotland, United Kingdom, Glasgow
- Coordinates: 55.8503°N 4.2341°W
- Construction started: 1889
- Opened: 1892

Design and construction
- Architect: William Leiper
- Designations: category A listed building

Templeton On The Green, converted from the Templeton Carpet Factory, is a distinctive building near the People's Palace, in Glasgow, Scotland, opened in 1892. In 1984 it was converted into the Templeton Business Centre, then in 2005 a major regeneration project made it into a mixed use 'lifestyle village' incorporating apartments, office space, and the WEST brewery, bar and restaurant.

== History ==
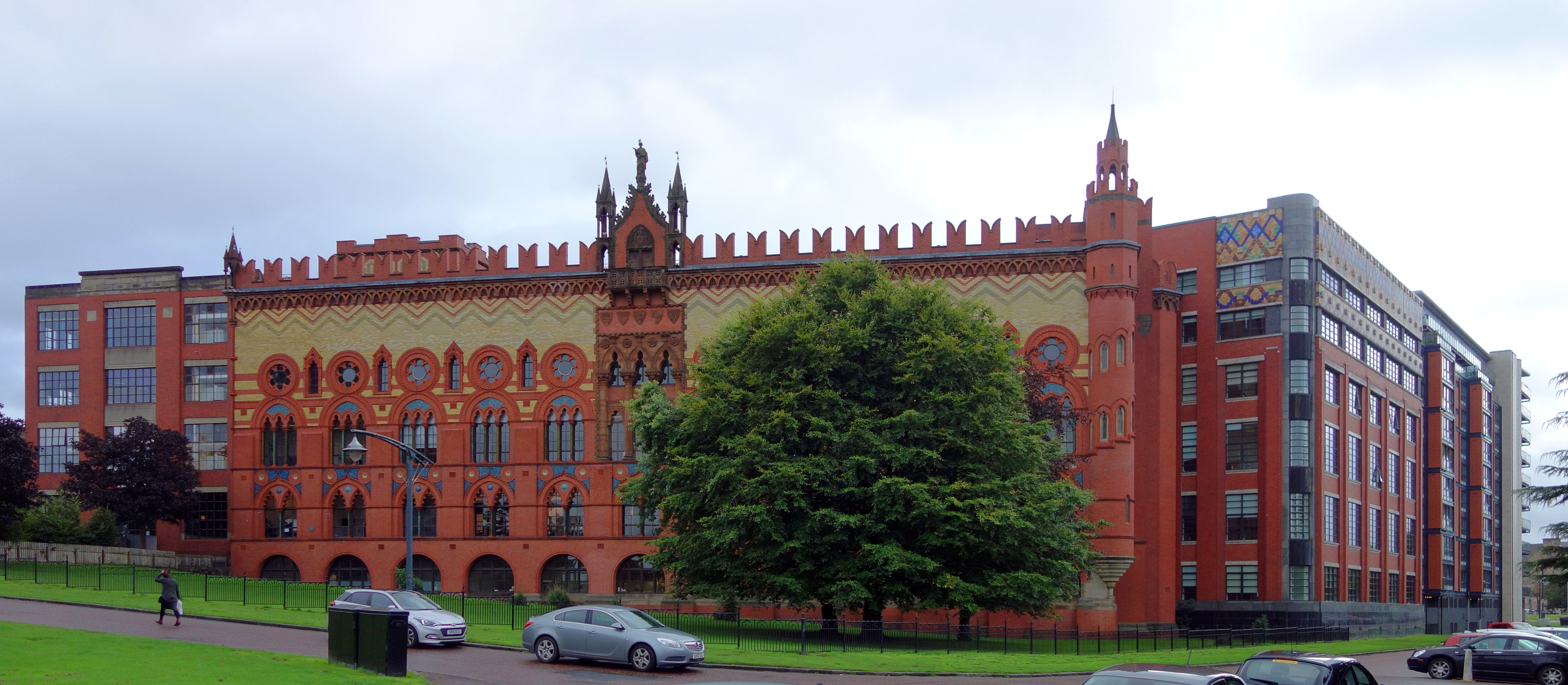
Templeton On The Green

The building was designed and built as a carpet factory for James Templeton and Son, for the manufacture of Templeton's patented spool Axminster carpets.

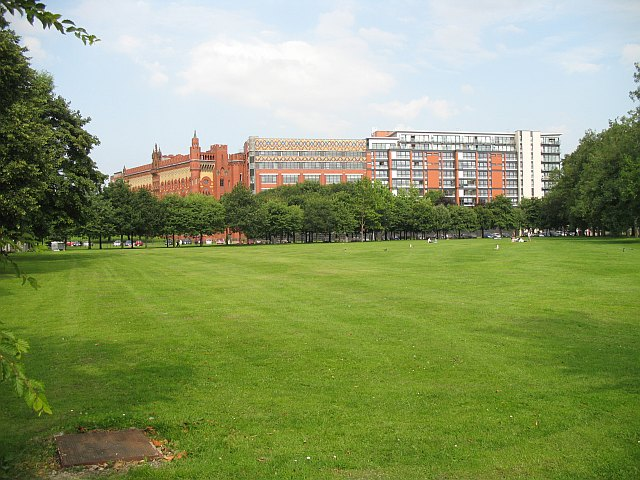

After repeated design proposals had been rejected by Glasgow Corporation, James Templeton hired the famous architect William Leiper to produce a design that would be so grand it could not possibly be rejected, so William Leiper modelled the building on the Doge's Palace in Venice. (Venetian Gothic style)

Construction began in 1888. On 1 November 1889, during construction, the factory façade collapsed due to insecure fixings and the wind which blew it down. 29 women were killed in adjacent weaving sheds. The building was completed in 1892. (The story of the disaster is carved in a section of stone beneath the base of Templeton Gate, installed during refurbishment work to the area in 2005.) The building was completed in 1892, at a cost of £20,000, but restoration of the collapsed facade and weaving sheds added £3000 to the building costs.

A fire in the factory in 1900 resulted in more deaths, commemorated by a female statue on top of the facade.

In 1983, James Templeton & Co merged with A F Stoddard and Henry Widnell & Stewart to form Stoddard Carpets. The building was converted by the Scottish Development Agency and became a business centre in 1984.

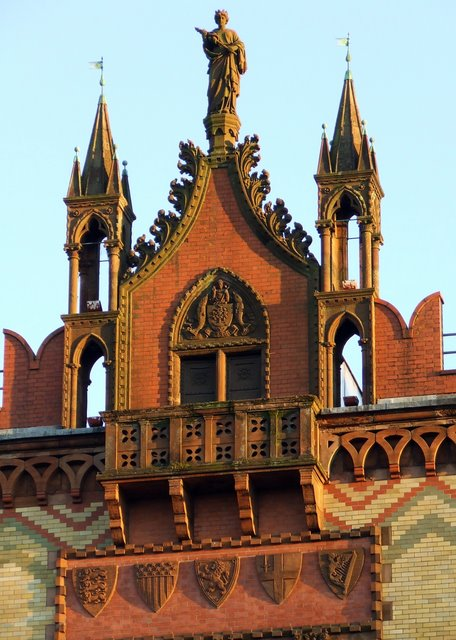
Templeton building detail

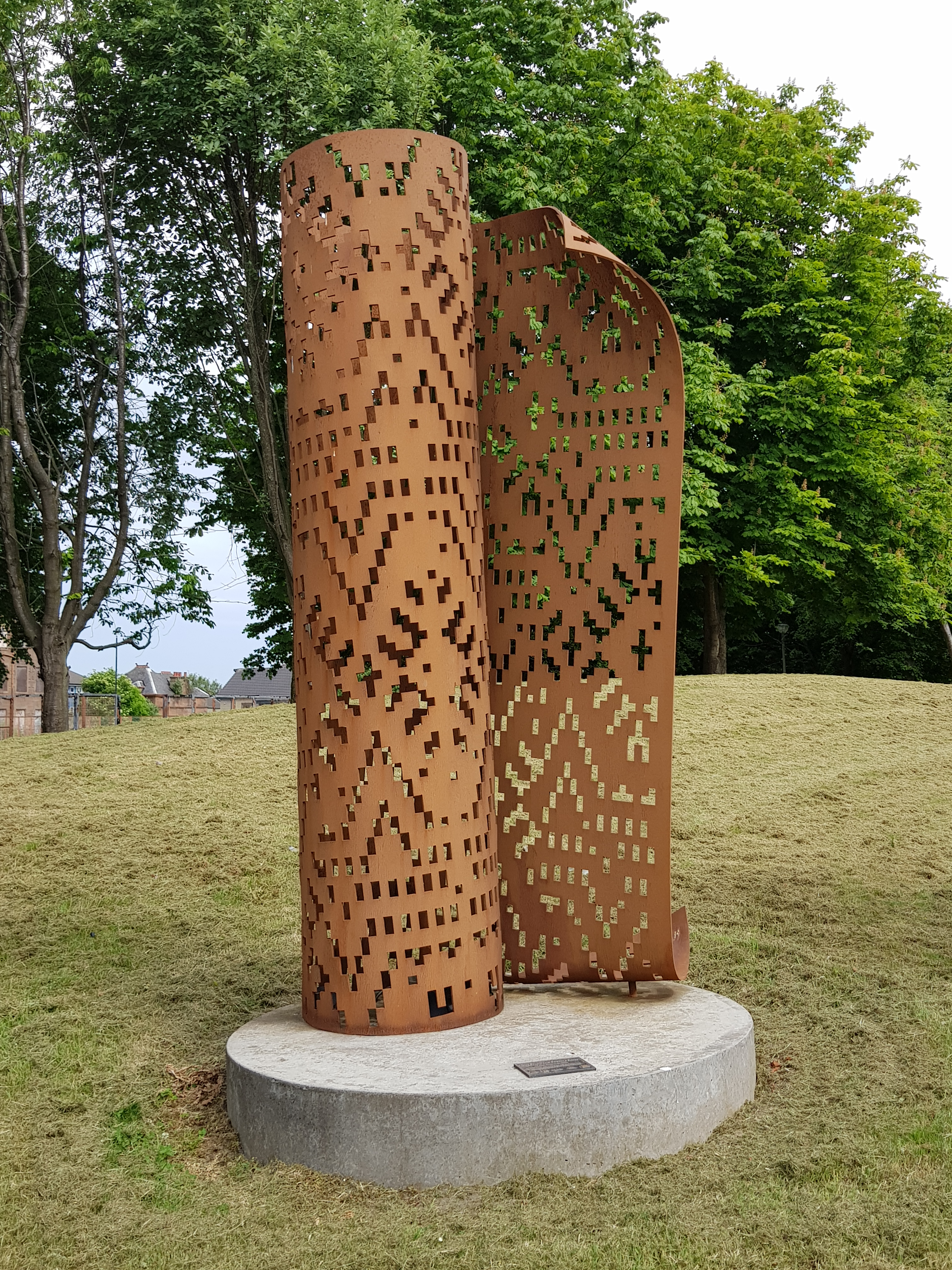
Cut from the factory floor, Iain Kettle

== Current use ==
In 2005, the building was extensively modified in a £22 million regeneration project to form a mixed use 'lifestyle village'. This incorporates 143 new apartments, accommodation for Sportscotland (the Scottish Institute of Sport), [IDP Architects], Front Page (a creative design studio) and the WEST brewery, bar and restaurant, which takes up the ground floor of the main building.
