= Thomas Western =

Thomas Western may refer to:

- Thomas Western (Royal Navy officer) (1761–1814) British admiral
- Sir Thomas Western, 1st Baronet (1795–1873), British Liberal politician, Member of Parliament (MP) for North Essex 1865–1868, illegitimate son of the above
- Sir Thomas Western, 2nd Baronet (1821–1877), English Liberal Party politician
