= Paisley Rekdal =

American poet

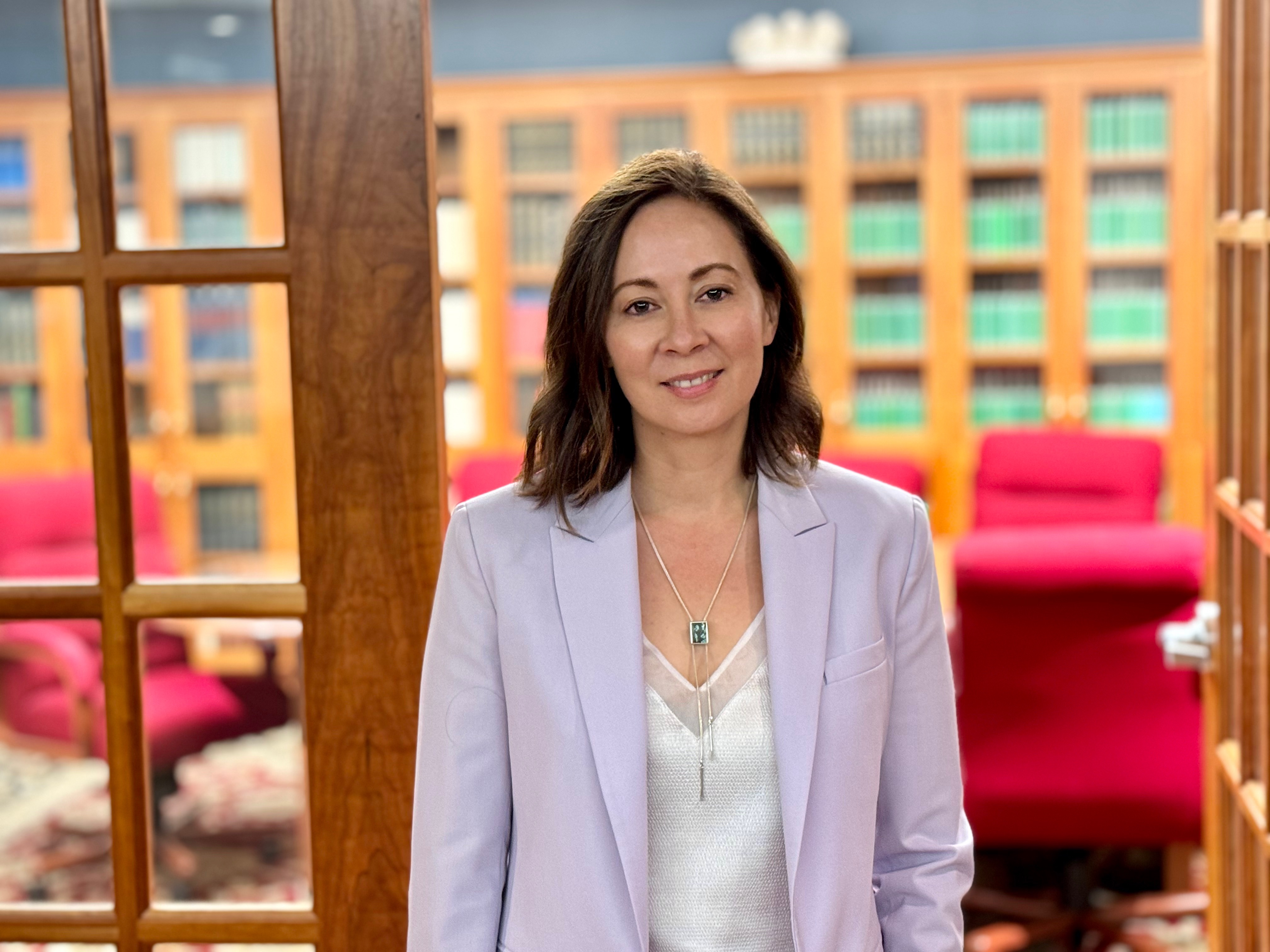
- Rekdal at AWP 2025
- Education: University of Washington (BA); Pontifical Institute of Mediaeval Studies (MA); University of Michigan (MFA)
- Occupations: Professor, University of Utah
- Writing career
- Genre: Poetry
- Website: Official website

Paisley Rekdal is an American poet and former Poet Laureate of Utah. She is the author of a book of essays, The Night My Mother Met Bruce Lee: Observations on Not Fitting In, the memoir Intimate, and six books of poetry. For her work, she has received numerous fellowships, grants, and awards, including a Guggenheim Fellowship, the 2024 The Kingsley and Kate Tufts Poetry Awards, the Amy Lowell Poetry Traveling Fellowship, a Fulbright Fellowship, a Civitella Ranieri Residency, a National Endowment for the Arts Fellowship, Pushcart Prizes in both 2009 and 2013, Narrative's Poetry Prize, the AWP Creative Nonfiction Prize, and several other awards from the state arts council. She has been recognized for her poems and essays in The New York Times Magazine, American Poetry Review, The Kenyon Review, The New Republic, Tin House, the Best American Poetry series, and on National Public Radio, among others. She was a recipient of a 2019 Academy of American Poets' Poets Laureate Fellowship.

== Early life and education ==
She grew up in Seattle, Washington, the daughter of a Chinese-American mother and a Norwegian father. She received a Bachelor of Arts degree from the University of Washington, as well as a Master of Arts degree from the University of Toronto for Medieval Studies and a Master of Fine Arts degree from the University of Michigan.

== Career ==
Rekdal is a professor at the University of Utah in Salt Lake City, and at Goddard College's low-residency Master of Fine Arts in Creative Writing program in Port Townsend, Washington. She is also credited with having created the community web project Mapping Salt Lake City.

Her work has appeared in Black Warrior Review, Denver Quarterly, Michigan Quarterly Review, Narrative Magazine, Nerve, New England Review, The New York Times Magazine, The New Yorker, NPR, Ploughshares, Prairie Schooner, Quarterly West, The Virginia Quarterly Review, and Blackbird.

She was appointed Poet Laureate of Utah in May 2017.

In 2018, Rekdal was awarded the Narrative Prize for a trilogy of poems, “Quiver,” “Telling the Wasps,” and “The Olive Tree at Vouves,” which combine "Keatsian lyricism with a mortal questioning of the nature of memory in the modern age."

In August 2025, the U.S. Air Force Academy canceled an invited lecture by Paisley Rekdal after discovering her social media posts criticizing former President Donald Trump, sparking debate over free speech and academic independence. The decision drew concern from the donor of the lecture series, who stated speakers' politics had not previously influenced selection.

== Works ==
=== Poetry ===
- A Crash of Rhinos. University of Georgia Press. 2000. ISBN 978-0-8203-2273-5.
- Six Girls Without Pants, Eastern Washington University Press, 2002, ISBN 9780910055826
- The Invention of the Kaleidoscope. University of Pittsburgh Press. 25 February 2007. ISBN 978-0-8229-9083-3.
- Animal Eye. University of Pittsburgh Press. 26 February 2012. ISBN 978-0-8229-7838-1.
- Imaginary Vessels. Copper Canyon Press, 2017 ISBN 1556594976
- Nightingale. Copper Canyon Press. 7 May 2019. ISBN 978-1-5565-9567-7
- West: A Translation. Copper Canyon Press. 2 May 2023. ISBN 9781556596568

=== Prose ===
- The Night My Mother Met Bruce Lee: Observations on Not Fitting In. Vintage Books. 18 December 2007. ISBN 978-0-307-42908-7.
- Intimate: An American Family Photo Album, Tupelo Press, 2012, ISBN 9781936797080
- The Broken Country, University of Georgia Press, 2017, ISBN 9780820351179
- Appropriate: A Provocation, W.W. Norton, 2021, ISBN 978-1-324-00358-8
- Real Toads, Imaginary Gardens: How to Read and Write Poetry Forensically, W.W. Norton, 2024, ISBN 978-0-393-88198-1
