= West, West Virginia =

Unincorporated community in West Virginia, US

Coordinates: 39°40′42″N 80°40′11″W

West is an unincorporated community in Wetzel County, in the U.S. state of West Virginia.

== History ==
A post office called West was established in 1864, and remained in operation until 1953. The origin of the name West is obscure; it might be named after the local West family.
