= The West: The History of an Idea =

2025 politics book by Georgios Varouxakis

The West: The History of an Idea is a 2025 politics book by Greek historian Georgios Varouxakis.

== Background ==
Georgios Varouxakis is a Greek historian of political thought at Queen Mary University of London.

== Summary ==
In the book, Varouxakis argues that the concept of the Western world primarily emerged between the 1820s and 1840s. He argues that, unlike other concepts that Europeans used to distinguish themselves from non-European countries (concepts that were mainly founded on European Christian identity), the concept of West was formulated with the goal of separating western European countries from other European countries (especially the Russian Empire, which was increasingly seen as a rival). Varouxakis points towards French philosopher Auguste Comte as being the key figure behind the popularisation of the concept.

In an interview with Philip Oltermann of The Guardian, Varouxakis stated that, particularly following the 1814-15 Congress of Vienna and the Ottoman Empire's loss in the 1821-1829 Greek War of Independence, "more and more western Europeans began to worry about Russia’s inevitable domination of Europe... In the 1830s, talk of “the west” and a “western alliance” became more acute, because by then Alexander I had died and Nicholas I was very despotic. There was an anxiety that Russia was not on the margins anymore and could be about to dominate Europe. Crucially, France had become a constitutional monarchy as of 1830 with the July Revolution. Suddenly an Anglo-French “western” alliance of constitutional regimes made sense in a way it didn’t before with the absolutist Bourbons."

== Critical reception ==
American political scientist John Ikenberry praised the book as a "masterful study." American historian Yuri Slezkine wrote that "Varouxakis tells this story with wit, insight, and erudition," praising it as "the first comprehensive history of the idea of the West is also, for the foreseeable future, the best." Max Skjönsberg of the University of Texas at Austin reviewed the book as "a must-read for anyone with an interest in current and world affairs," describing it was "a monumental achievement of scholarship. Its chief contribution is its decentering of imperial and racial paradigms, which have become politicized and turned into stale orthodoxies that have led to distortions in historical understanding." British historian Mark Mazower described the book as "a salutary reminder of how recent our ideas about the ancient past can really be and how deceptively complex are the ties that bind us with it."

Jaroslaw Kuisz of the University of Oxford reviewed the book as "both chronological and thematic," while warning that "its primary limitation is the absence of a usable classification system for readers seeking to navigate the labyrinth. Thus, his declared aim—to transcend the ivory tower and offer conceptual tools of social relevance—remains only partly fulfilled." Ukrainian writer Oksana Forostyna described the book as "messy, cacophonous," saying that "if Varouxakis’ aim was to prove how complicated, self-contradictory, and ambiguous the term is, his book succeeds. It also proves, it seems, that no one was « the West » from the beginning (whatever we consider the beginning)," but that "what would make the book more balanced, however, is giving more room to voices who were forced to question their own « westernness », including those from the author’s native Greece."

== See also ==
=== External links ===
LibraryThing
