= West (brewery) =

Alcoholic beverage restaurant

Coordinates: 55.85088°N 4.23387°W

WEST Brewery
- Industry: Alcoholic beverage, restaurant
- Founded: 2006; 20 years ago
- Headquarters: Glasgow, Scotland, UK
- Products: Beer
- Owner: Petra Wetzel
- Website: www.westbeer.com

West brewery is an alcoholic beverage restaurant located in the Templeton Building in Glasgow Green, Scotland. West produces German Style lagers and wheat beers, both in kegs and bottles, which are sold primarily to the UK market. All West lagers and wheat beers are brewed in accordance with the 1516 Reinheitsgebot, the German Purity Law.

== History ==
West Brewery opened in March 2006, serving beer made in its Glasgow Green microbrewery to customers in the adjoining beer hall, West on the Green. The company West Brewing Company went into administration, but was bought back by Wetzel in 2008.

In 2016, following a decade in business, West opened a new £5 million brewery, housed in the same premises within the Templeton Building on Glasgow Green. The new brewery brought with it a ten-fold increase in capacity to 2,500,000 litres (550,000 imp gal; 660,000 US gal) per year.

In the same year, West on the Green also expanded with the opening of an adjacent 250-capacity Wedding and Events space.

== Products ==
All West beers are brewed in accordance with the 1516 Reinheitsgebot, the German Purity Law which allows only malt (barley,wheat,oats or rye), hops, yeast and water to be used in the brewing process.

== Awards ==
West has won many awards for its lagers and wheat beer, as well as for the restaurant on Glasgow Green. Awards include:

- SIBA Supreme Champion Craft Beer in Keg 2011 (Gold) for Hefeweizen
- SIBA Champion Speciality Beer 2011 (Gold) for Hefeweizen
- SIBA Champion Coloured and Dark Lager 2011 (Silver) for Munich Red
- SIBA Champion Coloured and Dark Lager 2011 (Bronze) for Dunkel
- AA Pub of the Year Scotland 2012-2013
- SLTN Family Outlet of the Year 2012
- Scottish Restaurant Awards – Best Family Friendly Restaurant 2011
