= Multiplatform Television Service =

In the cable television industry, Multiplatform Service refers to the secure delivery of rich media, information and applications to any device, regardless of transport, distribution system or user interface, providing the consumer with flawless, integrated and user activity access and management of their entertainment and communication services.

== Applications ==
- Caller ID between TV and voice phone
- Video Phone: Manage personal services from a web interface: ringtones, forwarding, v-mail boxes
- Location or Device Shifting of a program from one device to another at the same spot in the program. For example: watch a program on TV – pause – continue watching on another device, such as your PC or TV, in another room
- Multi-room Whole Home DVR services: record once and watch in any room on any device.
- Alerts for notification of program availability. Alerts can appear on other devices. Alerts may also include options to record, tune or add to watch list
- PC to TV viewing: access content on the PC via the TV
- TV to PC viewing: access content on the TV via the PC
- Management setting preferences on one device (PC) for another device (TV), parental controls, manage accounts
- Personal programming capabilities: set recordings to your DVR from the phone
- Personalization: set preferences, set favorites, include zip codes for location services
- Communication: email, voicemail consumption on multiple devices, social sites
- Network-DVR or Digital Locker: content is in the cloud
- Media Management: moving content throughout the home (using DLNA and other standards)
- Personalizing Advertising: targeted or addressable advertising
- Social Networking Applications: sharing of programming clips, scheduled recording, and real-time commentary during shows

== Sources ==
- http://www.multichannel.com/article/453840-Multiplatform_Usage_Soars_Around_World_Cup_ESPN_XP_Research.php
- http://www.multichannel.com/article/455221-Disney_Channel_s_Mickey_Mouse_Special_Revs_Up_Multiplatform_Exposure.php
- https://www.nytimes.com/2010/01/04/technology/04video.html?_r=1
