= Westerner =

Westerner or Westerners may refer to:

== People ==
- a person from the Western world
- a person from the Western United States

== Sports ==
- Westerner (horse) (born 1999), British Thoroughbred, 2005 winner of the Ascot Gold Cup horse race
- Westerner States, former name of the Hollywood Derby American Thoroughbred horse race
- Ballinger Westerners, a former minor league baseball team based in Ballinger, Texas
- Danbury Westerners, a collegiate summer baseball team based in Danbury, Connecticut, United States
- Westerners, nickname of Western Texas College, a public community college in Snyder, Texas, United States
- Westerner, mascot of Lubbock High School, Lubbock, Texas

== Transportation ==
- Westerner, a train operated by the Missouri Pacific Railroad between St. Louis and Kansas City, Missouri
- Westerner, a train operated by the New York, Chicago and St. Louis Railroad between Buffalo and Chicago
- Westerner, a train operated by the Texas and Pacific Railway between St. Louis and El Paso
- USS Westerner, a United States Navy cargo ship in commission from 1918 to 1919
- Westerner, a limited-edition, luxury version of the AMC Rebel station wagon

== Other uses ==
- Westerner Gambling House and Saloon, a former Las Vegas casino owned by Benny Binion
- Westerners (Korean political faction), a political faction in 16th-century Korea
- Westerner, a short-lived comic book (three issues) put out by I. W. Publications
- The Westerner, a 2016 album by John Doe (musician)

== See also ==
- The Westerner (disambiguation)
