= Roda Viva =

- Genre: Journalism, talk show
- Created by: Rodolpho Gamberini
- Presented by: Ernesto Paglia (since 2026)
- Opening theme: "Splintered in Her Head" by The Cure (1986–1994); Various themes (1994–2008; 2017–present); Roda Viva by Chico Buarque and MPB4 (instrumental; 2008–2016)
- Country of origin: Brazil

Production
- Camera setup: Multicamera
- Running time: 90 minutes

Original release
- Network: TV Cultura
- Release: 29 September 1986 – present

Roda Viva is a Brazilian talk show produced and broadcast by TV Cultura since 29 September 1986, traditionally on Monday nights, currently airing at 10 PM (BST). Several political leaders, writers, philosophers, artists, and notable people were interviewed in the show.

Roda Viva features a host presenter, who serves as a mediator, and several journalists from news outlets. In the program the guest sits on a swivel chair in the middle of a circle of journalists, who are in a higher position. The interviewed person turns to answer the journalist asking the question. The studio is surrounded by cameras, so the guest is always facing at least one of them. The mood of the show is of an informal conversation.

Among the people interviewed in Roda Viva were István Mészáros, Marina Silva, Enéas Carneiro, Luís Carlos Prestes, Fernando Henrique Cardoso, José Sarney, Fernando Collor, Fidel Castro, Itamar Franco, Ciro Gomes, Roberto Campos, Eduardo Campos, José Saramago, Tom Jobim, Leonel Brizola, Luiz Inácio Lula da Silva, Dilma Rousseff, Newton Cruz, Cabo Anselmo, Jimmy Wales, Hugo Chávez, Noam Chomsky, Yuval Noah Harari, Sônia Braga, and Mario Vargas Llosa.

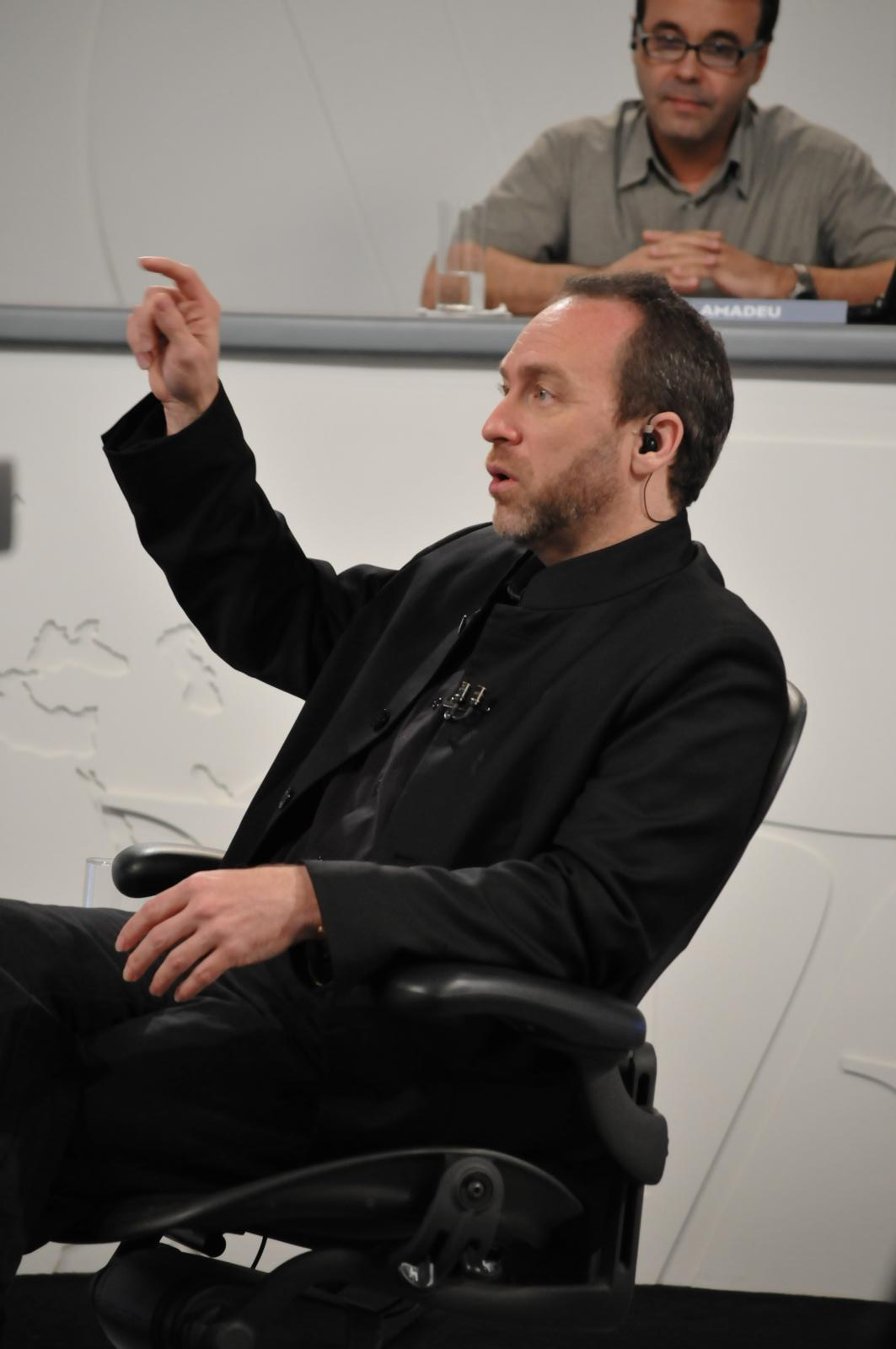
Jimmy Wales being interviewed in 2008

== Hosts ==
Mediator	Seasons	Episodes
Ernesto Paglia	2026–present	
Vera Magalhães	2020–2026	
Daniela Lima	2019-2020	
Ricardo Lessa	2018-2019	
Augusto Nunes	2013-2018	about 500
Mario Sergio Conti	2011-2013	223
Marília Gabriela	2010-2011	213
Heródoto Barbeiro	2009	187
Lillian Witte Fibe	2008	167
Carlos Eduardo Lins da Silva	2008	135
Paulo Markun	1998-2007	45
Matinas Suzuki Jr.	1995-1998	12
Heródoto Barbeiro	1994-1995	123
Roseli Tardelli	1994	67
Rodolfo Konder	1990	56
Jorge Escosteguy	1989-1994	12
Augusto Nunes	1987-1989	23
Rodolpho Gamberini	1986-1987	56

== Awards and nominations ==
Year	Event	Category	Results
1987	Troféu Imprensa	Best talk show	Nominated
1988	Troféu Imprensa	Best talk show	Won
1989	Troféu Imprensa	Best talk show	Nominated
2001	Troféu Imprensa	Best talk show	Won
2007	Troféu Imprensa	Best talk show	Won
