= Wests =

Wests may refer to:

- Wests (drink), a New Zealand beverage manufacturer
- Wests Panthers, an Australian rugby league football club based in Brisbane Western Suburbs
- Wests Tigers, an Australian rugby league team in the NRL, from Inner West and Western Sydney
- Western Suburbs Magpies, an Australian rugby league football club based in Sydney's Western Suburbs
- Western Suburbs Rosellas, an Australian rugby league football club based in Newcastle's Western Suburbs

== See also ==
- West (disambiguation)
- Western (disambiguation)
