= Western Avenue =

Western Avenue may refer to:

== United Kingdom ==
- Western Avenue (London)

== United States ==
- Western Avenue (Albany, New York)
- Western Avenue (Chicago)
- Western Avenue (Los Angeles)
- Western Avenue (Washington, D.C.)
- Western Avenue station (Milwaukee District) on the Milwaukee District North Line, Milwaukee District West Line, and North Central Service in West Town, Chicago, Illinois
- Western Avenue station (BNSF Railway) on the BNSF Line in Pilsen, Chicago, Illinois
- Western Avenue station (Metro Transit) in Saint Paul, Minnesota
