= Paolo Guzzi =

Italian poet and critic

Paolo Guzzi, born in 1940, is an Italian poet and critic.

== Works ==
- Consumo pro capite, Trevi, Rome, 1973
- Moduli di trasformazione, foreword by Fabio Doplicher, Carte Segrete, Rome, 1980
- Continuum. 1983-1984, Lucarini, Rome, 1985
- Magazzini generali n. 5, a booklet with Raffaella Spera and Antonio Spagnuolo), 1987
- Dizionario inverso, foreword by Lamberto Pignotti, Il Ventaglio, Rome, 1991
- Ecografie, Campanotto, Udine, 1999
- Teatro e no, Giubbe Rosse, Florence, 2004
