= Justice West =

Justice West may refer to:

- Charles S. West (1829–1885), associate justice of the Texas Supreme Court
- Jesse F. West (1862–1929), associate justice of the Virginia Supreme Court of Appeals
- Judson S. West (1855–1935), associate justice of the Kansas Supreme Court
- Lee Roy West (1929–2020), Special justice of the Oklahoma Supreme Court
- Thomas F. West (1874–1931), associate justice and chief justice of the Florida Supreme Court from 1917 to 1925
- William H. West (judge) (1824–1911), associate justice of the Ohio Supreme Court
- William West (Rhode Island politician) (c. 1733–1816), associate justice of the Rhode Island Supreme Court
