= Augusto Nunes =

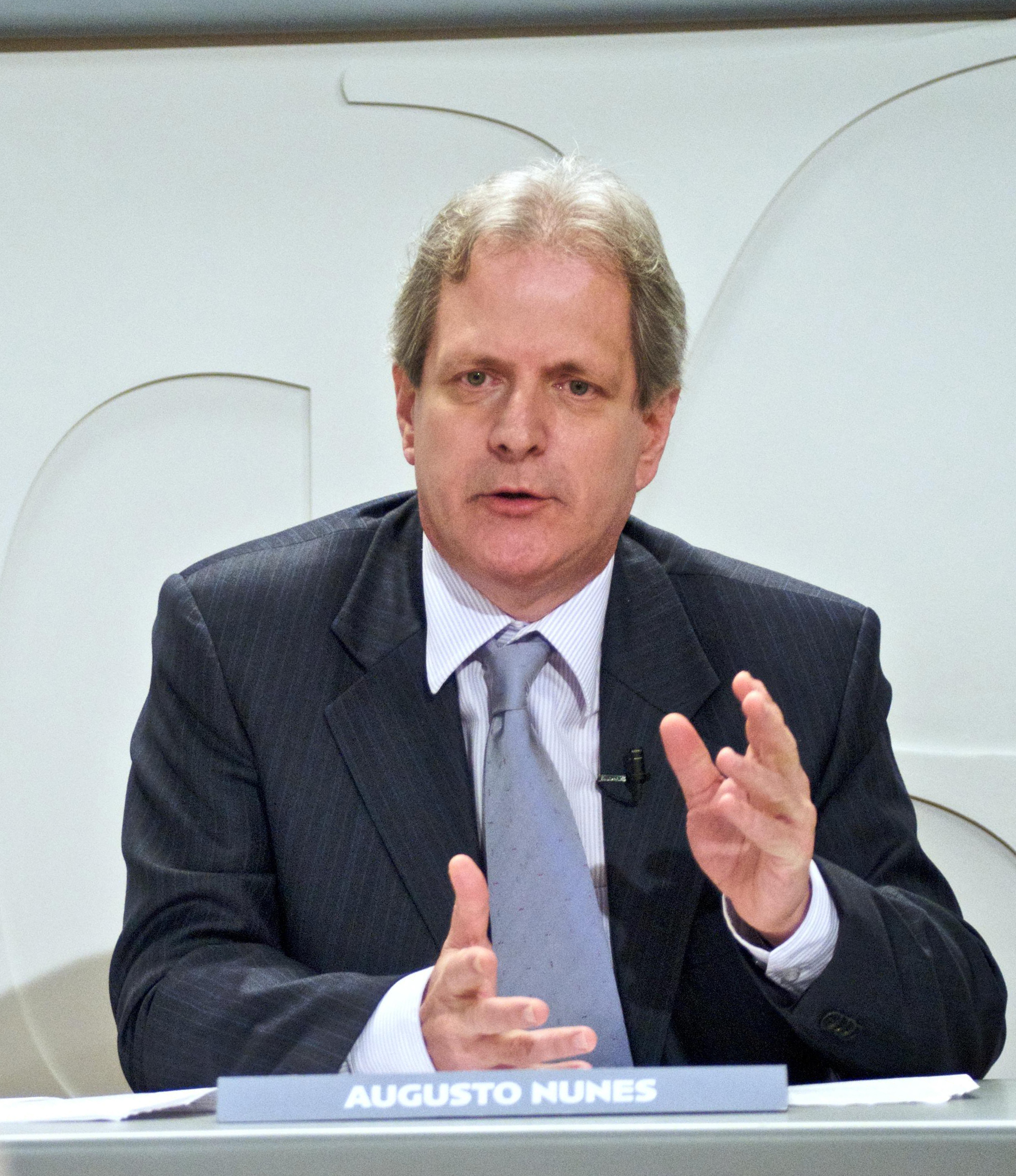
Augusto Nunes in 2014 - foto: Silvio Tanaka - TV Cultura

Augusto Nunes da Silva (born September 25, 1949; Taquaritinga, state of São Paulo) is a Brazilian journalist, writer and commentator. He is one of Brazil's main conservative journalists.

== Career ==
He was a columnist for Veja magazine, editor-in-chief of R7 and host of the journal of Record News.

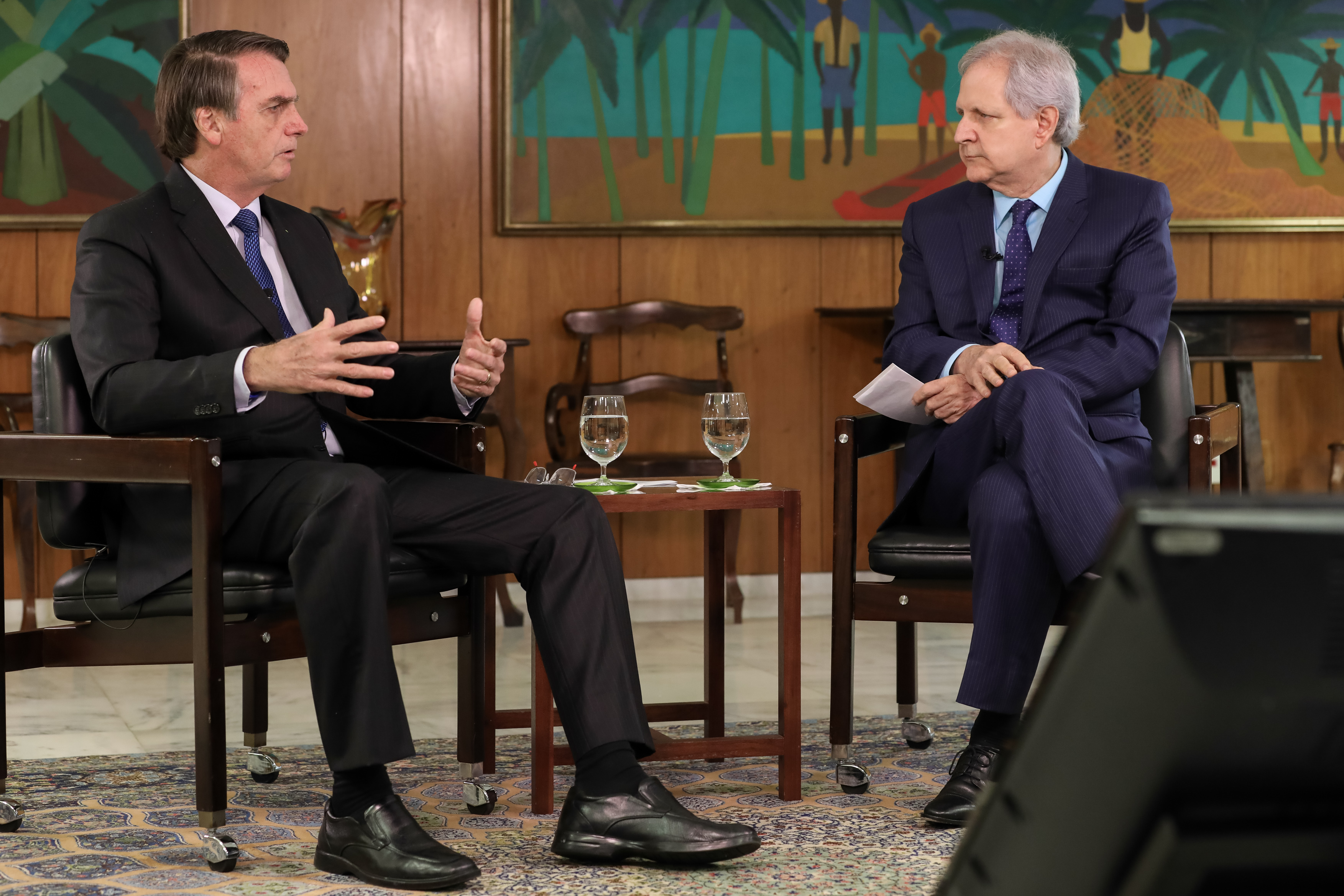
Augusto Nunes (right) interviewing Brazilian president Jair Bolsonaro (left).

He was the main interviewer of the Roda Viva program between 2010 and 2014.

Currently he works at Jovem Pan, being a commentator on the program Os Pingos nos Is and host of Direto ao Ponto, as well as writing for Revista Oeste.

=== Fight with Glenn Greenwald ===
In 2019, Augusto attacked American journalist Glenn Greenwald live on air.

== Awards ==
He won the ExxonMobil Journalism Award four times.

Nunes was included in a selection of the six most important journalists in Brazil, according to Fundação Getulio Vargas (FGV).
