= José Roberto Guzzo =

Brazilian journalist (1943–2025)

José Roberto Dias Guzzo (July 10, 1943 – August 2, 2025), better known as J.R. Guzzo, was a Brazilian journalist.

== Life and career ==
Guzzo was born July 10, 1943, in São Paulo. Between 1976 and 1991, he was the editor-in-chief of the magazine Veja. He was involved in controversy in November 2012 surrounding an article in the magazine, which was considered homophobic, for its comparison of homosexuality and zoophilia. In October 2019, Guzzo was fired from Veja, after the magazine did not publish his column criticizing the Supreme Court.

Guzzo died at 5:00 BRT on August 2, 2025, 23 days after his 82nd birthday.
