= Allie LeClaire =

American basketball player (born 1996)

Eastern Illinois
- League: Ohio Valley Conference

Personal information
- Born: February 13, 1996 (age 30) Green Bay, Wisconsin, U.S.
- Listed height: 5 ft 10 in (1.78 m)

Career information
- High school: Notre Dame Academy (Green Bay, Wisconsin)
- College: Green Bay (2014–2018)
- Playing career: 2018–2020
- Coaching career: 2020–present

Career history

Playing
- 2018–2019: Liffey Celtics
- 2019: Wisconsin GLO
- 2020: Young Angels Košice

Coaching
- 2020–2021: St. Norbert College (assistant)
- 2021–2024: Eastern Illinois University (assistant)
- 2024-present: University of Wisconsin–Green Bay (assistant)

Career highlights
- Irish National Cup Winner (2019); Women's Super League Player of the Year (2019); Global Women's Basketball Association Champion (2019); Horizon League tournament MVP (2018)

Allison LeClaire (born February 13, 1996) is an American former professional basketball player currently serving as an assistant coach for the University of Wisconsin–Green Bay women's basketball team. LeClaire attended Notre Dame Academy in Green Bay, Wisconsin, and played college basketball for UWGB. LeClaire went on to play professionally overseas for the Liffey Celtics of the Irish Women's Super League and Young Angels Košice of the Slovak Women's Basketball Extraliga before returning to the United States to coach.

== Early life ==
LeClaire was born in 1996 in Green Bay, Wisconsin. She attended Notre Dame Academy, where her teams won back-to-back Division II state basketball titles in 2013 and 2014. LeClaire was a heavily lauded high school player, earning multiple All-State and player of the year awards. She graduated as Notre Dame's all-time leading scorer.

== College career ==
LeClaire committed to the University of Wisconsin—Green Bay and did not redshirt for her freshman season, averaging 20.1 minutes per game and leading the team in three-point shooting percentage. In her sophomore season, LeClaire led the team in scoring with 12.5 points per game, and finished her collegiate career two years later earning Horizon League Player of the Week honors for the week of January 8, 2018. LeClaire was also named All-Horizon League Second Team that season and was the Horizon League Tournament MVP. LeClaire is seventh on Green Bay's all-time scoring list with 1,489 points, and never missed a game in her collegiate career.

== Professional career ==
In July 2018, LeClaire signed a contract with the Liffey Celtics of the Irish Women's Super League, where she averaged 19.4 points per game, 6.6 rebounds per game, 2.9 assists per game, and 1.8 steals per game. LeClaire won the Irish National Cup with Liffey, and was named the league's player of the year. Over the summer of 2019, LeClaire joined former teammates Jessica Lindstrom and Mehryn Kraker on the Wisconsin GLO of the Global Women's Basketball Association, where they won the league's inaugural championship. After the GLO's summer season, she signed a short-term contract with Young Angels Košice of the Slovak Women's Basketball Extraliga, where she was named Import Player of the Year as well as guard of the year.

== Coaching career ==
LeClaire opted not to sign an extension with Young Angels, and returned to the United States in March 2020, feeling that her career as a player was at an end. LeClaire served as coach for the Wisconsin Legends AAU team before her hiring at St. Norbert College in April 2020, replacing outgoing assistant coach Sam Terry.
