= Jessica Lindstrom =

American basketball player (born 1996)

No. 21 – Luleå Basket
- Position: Forward
- League: Basketligan dam

Personal information
- Born: February 28, 1996 (age 30) Superior, Wisconsin, U.S.
- Listed height: 6 ft 1 in (1.85 m)

Career information
- High school: Superior (Superior, Wisconsin)
- College: Green Bay (2014–2018)
- WNBA draft: 2018: undrafted
- Playing career: 2018–present

Career history
- 2018–2019: T71 Dudelange
- 2019: Wisconsin GLO
- 2019–2021: Kangoeroes Basket Mechelen
- 2021–2024: BC Castors Braine
- 2024-present: Luleå Basket

Career highlights
- Global Women's Basketball Association Championship Game MVP (2019); First-team All-Horizon League (2018); Horizon League Tournament MVP (2017); 3× All-Horizon League Defensive Team (2016–2018)

Jessica Lindstrom (born February 28, 1996) is an American professional basketball player for Luleå Basket of the Basketligan dam, having previously played for the Wisconsin GLO of the Global Women's Basketball Association and T71 Dudelange, and Kangoeroes Basket Mechelen. A standout at Superior High School that led the school to a state finals berth in 2014, Lindstrom played college basketball for the University of Wisconsin–Green Bay.

== Early life ==
Lindstrom was born in Superior, Wisconsin and attended Superior High School. At Superior, Lindstrom was a successful and heavily lauded player. She graduated as the all-time scoring and rebounding leader for either basketball program at the school, and was one of three players at the school to score 1,000 career points. Her senior year, Lindstrom led the Spartans to the Division 1 state championship game, which they lost to Mukwonago High School. For her performance in the postseason, Lindstrom was named to the State All-Tournament Team. She also received Associated Press All-State First Team honors in 2013 and 2014, and also received Wisconsin Basketball Coaches Association All-State honors all four years of high school, twice as an honorable mention and twice as First Team All-State. Local newspapers the Duluth News Tribune and Superior Telegram each named Lindstrom as their player of the year multiple times, thrice for the News-Tribune and four times for the Telegram. Entering her freshman year of college, Lindstrom ranked at #223 on Blue Star Basketball's top recruits for the 2014 season.

== College career ==
Lindstrom received offers from the University of Wisconsin–Madison, Marquette University, University of Wisconsin–Milwaukee, Drake University, Northern Illinois University, and North Dakota State University, but opted to play for the University of Wisconsin–Green Bay. In her freshman season, Lindstrom appeared in 25 games, averaging 10.3 minutes per game. The following season, Lindstrom led the team in rebounds, field goal percentage, and double-doubles, leading to a selection for the Horizon League's All-Defensive Team. Her junior season, Lindstrom started all but one game for Green Bay, and twice scored a career-high 24 points against Marquette and Cleveland State. She also led the team in rebounds and received Horizon League Player of the Week honors three times. In her final year, Lindstrom averaged a double-double per game with 15 points and 10.5 rebounds per game, winning multiple awards and setting multiple school records.

=== Green Bay statistics ===
Legend
| GP | Games played | GS | Games started | MPG | Minutes per game |
| FG% | Field goal percentage | 3P% | 3-point field goal percentage | FT% | Free throw percentage |
| RPG | Rebounds per game | APG | Assists per game | SPG | Steals per game |
| BPG | Blocks per game | PPG | Points per game | **Bold** | Career high |

| Year | Team | GP | Points | FG% | 3P% | FT% | RPG | APG | SPG | BPG | PPG |
|---|---|---|---|---|---|---|---|---|---|---|---|
| 2014–15 | Green Bay | 25 | 119 | 46.3% | 34.3% | 71.7% | 2.9 | 0.3 | 0.5 | 0.1 | 4.8 |
| 2015–16 | Green Bay | 33 | 330 | 47.1% | 35.8% | 56.0% | 8.8 | 1.0 | 1.0 | **0.6** | 10.0 |
| 2016–17 | Green Bay | 33 | 432 | **48.9%** | **40.3%** | 72.0% | 9.8 | 1.4 | **1.2** | 0.5 | 13.1 |
| 2017–18 | Green Bay | 33 | **498** | 48.7% | 37.5% | **76.5%** | **10.5** | **2.3** | 1.2 | **0.6** | **15.1** |
| Career | | 124 | 1379 | 48.2% | 37.7% | 70.2% | 8.3 | 1.3 | 1.0 | 0.5 | 11.1 |

== Professional career ==
Lindstrom was invited to the Los Angeles Sparks' training camp, but did not make the final roster. She signed a contract with T71 Dudelange in June 2018 and announced in April 2019 that she would return to Wisconsin to play for the Oshkosh, Wisconsin-based Wisconsin GLO of the Global Women's Basketball Association, beginning shortly after the Total League season ended. Lindstrom played for the GLO with former teammates Mehryn Kraker and Allie LeClaire, as well as Julie Wojta, considered Green Bay's all-time best women's basketball player. In the GWBA, Lindstrom led the GLO to a championship, and was named the championship game's most valuable player. Over the summer of 2019, Lindstrom signed a contract with Kangoeroes Basket Mechelen of the Pro Basketball League, playing there for two years before joining BC Castors Braine in 2021.

== Awards and honors ==
=== High school ===
- 2× Associated Press All-State First Team (2013, 2014)
- 2× Wisconsin Basketball Coaches Association (WBCA) First Team All-State (2013, 2014)
- Wisconsin Interscholastic Athletic Association State All-Tournament Team (2014)
- 2× WBCA All-State Honorable Mention (2011, 2012)
- 4× Lake Superior Conference First Team All-Conference (2010–2014)
- 4× Superior Telegram Player of the Year
- 3× Duluth News-Tribune All-Area Player of the Year
- Wisconsin Sports Network Top Post Player of the Year (2014)
- All-time scoring and rebounding leader across both boys and girls basketball

=== College ===
- First Team All-Horizon League (2018)
- 3× All-Horizon League Defensive Team (2016, 2017, 2018)
- 3x Horizon League All-Tournament Team (2016, 2017, 2018)
- Horizon League All-Tournament MVP (2017)
- Second Team All-Horizon League (2017)
- 7× Horizon League Player of the Week (3 in 2017, 4 in 2018)
- Program record holder for double-doubles (41)
- Program record holder for rebounds (1,030)
- Tied program record for single-season rebounds (345)

=== Professional ===
- Global Women's Basketball Association Championship Game MVP
