= Cofrin Memorial Arboretum =

Botanical garden in Green Bay, Wisconsin, US

Coordinates: 44°32′10″N 87°54′58″W

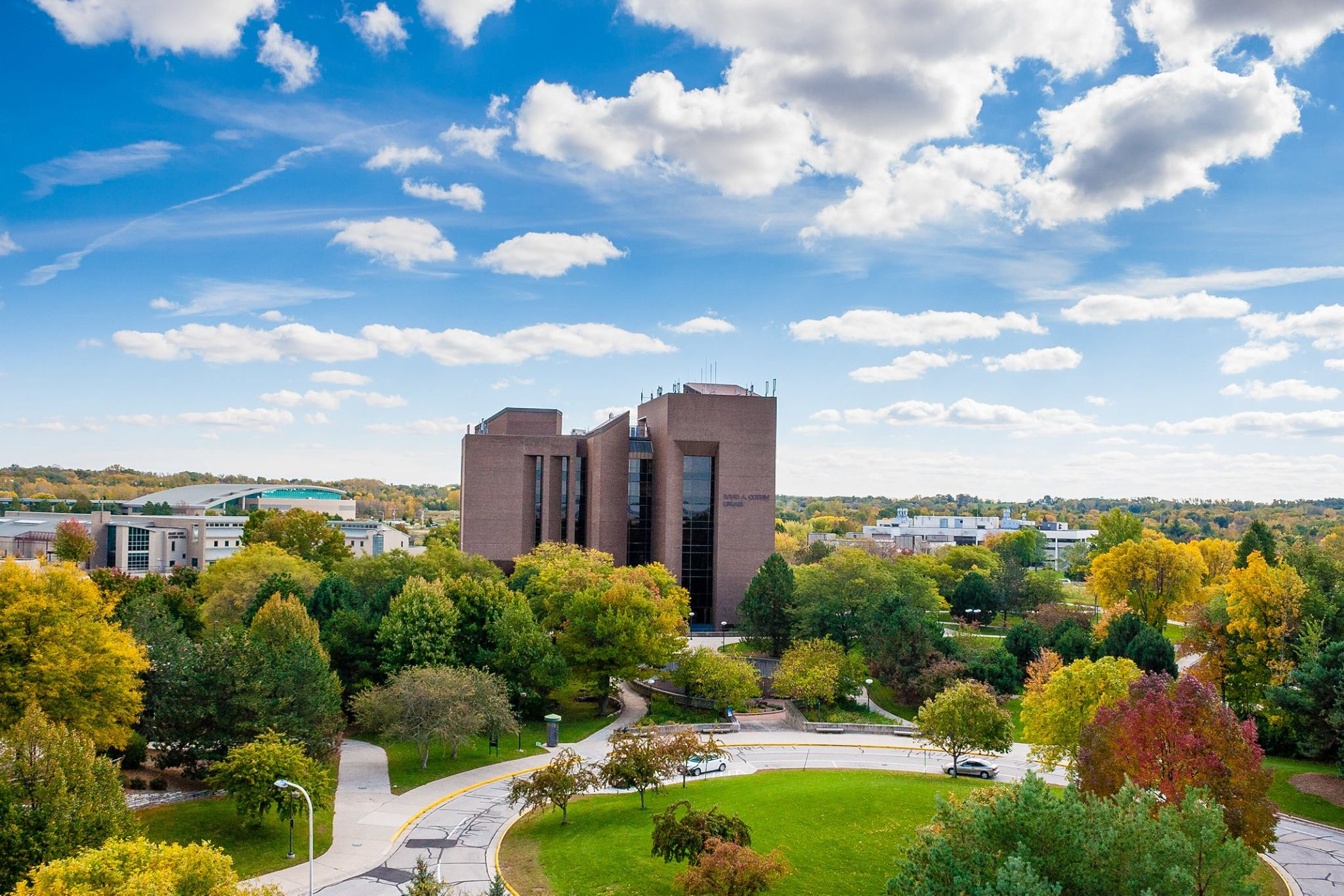
- The arboretum surrounds the Green Bay campus.
- Interactive map of Cofrin Memorial Arboretum
- Type: Arboretum
- Location: University of Wisconsin–Green Bay campus in Green Bay, Wisconsin
- Area: 290 acres (120 ha)
- Website: www.uwgb.edu/arboretum/

The Cofrin Memorial Arboretum 290 acres (120 hectares) surrounds the University of Wisconsin–Green Bay campus in Green Bay, Wisconsin, United States. Its six miles (10 km) of trails are open to the public.

== History ==
Today's Arboretum began in 1971, when a long-range campus plan was drawn up, recommending the creation of a park-like arboretum and trail system. In 1975, a major contribution in honor of John and Austin Cofrin enabled development of the trails, additional property, and improvements in the botanical plantings.

== Areas ==
At present the Arboretum contains the following areas:

Keith White Prairie
8.5 acres (3.4) maintained through prescribed burns. Grasses include big bluestem, Indian grass, and switch grass. Flower species include yellow cone flower, prairie dock, lupin, black-eyed Susan, spiderwort, and false indigo.
Mahon Woods
a remnant of the indigenous forests, with 59 species of trees and shrubs including oaks (Quercus alba, Quercus rubra), sugar maple (Acer saccharum), and white pines (Pinus strobus). Other species include trillium (Trillium grandiflorum), trout lilies (Erythronium americanum, Erythronium albidum), violets (Viola sororia, Viola pubescens), and toothworts (Dentaria laciniata, Dentaria diphylla).
Niagara Escarpment
white cedar trees.
Northern Barrens
An artificially developed sandy habitat for plant species that cannot flourish in the clay soils of the campus.
Oak Savanna
scattered oak trees within fields of grasses and herbs.
Paul Sager Tract
20 acres (8 hectares) including small natural springs, 2 ponds, and associated wetlands.
Succession Plots
13 experimental plots ranging in age from 2 to 17 years of natural succession. At present, its plants include, in rough order of succession: lamb's quarters (Chenopodium album), ragweed (Ambrosia artemisiifolia), foxtail grass (Setaria glauca), bluegrass (Poa pratensis), quackgrass (Agropyron repens), smooth brome (Bromus inermis), goldenrods (Solidago canadensis, Solidago graminifolia) asters (Aster novae-angliae, Aster ericoides), box elder (Acer negundo), cottonwood (Populus deltoides), quaking aspen (Populus tremuloides), sugar maple (Acer saccharum), American beech (Fagus grandifolia), eastern hemlock (Tsuga canadensis) and yellow birch (Betula alleghaniensis).

== See also ==
- List of botanical gardens and arboretums in Wisconsin
