= Kate Peterson Abiad =

American basketball player and coach

Current position
- Title: Head coach
- Team: Purdue Fort Wayne
- Conference: Horizon League
- Record: 0–0 (–)

Biographical details
- Born: January 25, 1969 (age 57); River Falls, Wisconsin, U.S.

Playing career
- 1987–1991: Wisconsin–Stevens Point

Coaching career (HC unless noted)
- 1991–1993: Indiana (assistant)
- 1993–1997: Eastern Illinois (assistant)
- 1997–2003: Wisconsin (assistant)
- 2003–2018: Cleveland State
- 2024–2026: Green Bay (assistant)
- 2026–present: Purdue Fort Wayne

Head coaching record
- Overall: 206–252 (.450)
- Tournaments: 0–2 (NCAA); 0–1 (WNIT); 1–1 (WBI)

Kathleen L. Peterson Abiad (born January 25, 1969) is the current head coach for the Purdue Fort Wayne Mastodons women's basketball team. She previously coached at Cleveland State from 2003 to 2018 and served as an assistant coach for Green Bay.

== Career ==
In 2008, she led the Vikings to their first Horizon League tournament championship and first-ever appearance in the NCAA tournament. After that season, she signed a contract extension through 2013. She came to the Vikings after serving as an assistant coach for the Indiana Hoosiers, Eastern Illinois Panthers, and Wisconsin Badgers.

== Head coaching record ==
Record table
Season	Team	Overall	Conference	Standing	Postseason
Cleveland State Vikings (Horizon League) (2003–2018)
2003–04	Cleveland State	12–16	9–7	T–4th	
2004–05	Cleveland State	4–25	2–14	9th	
2005–06	Cleveland State	4–24	2–14	9th	
2006–07	Cleveland State	8–22	5–11	T–6th	
2007–08	Cleveland State	19–14	10–8	T–4th	NCAA First Round
2008–09	Cleveland State	19–13	12–6	3rd	
2009–10	Cleveland State	19–14	11–7	4th	NCAA First Round
2010–11	Cleveland State	21–12	12–6	T–2nd	WBI Second Round
2011–12	Cleveland State	12–19	6–12	7th	
2012–13	Cleveland State	13–17	5–11	T–6th	
2013–14	Cleveland State	14–16	9–7	5th	
2014–15	Cleveland State	19–13	10–6	3rd	WNIT First Round
2015–16	Cleveland State	9–20	6–12	8th	
2016–17	Cleveland State	14–16	9–9	6th	
2017–18	Cleveland State	19–11	11–7	T–4th	
Cleveland State:		206–252 (.450)	122–137 (.471)		
Purdue Fort Wayne Mastodons (Horizon League) (2026–present)
2026–27	Purdue Fort Wayne	–	–		
Purdue Fort Wayne:		– (–)	– (–)		
Total:		206–252 (.450)			
National champion Postseason invitational champion Conference regular season champion Conference regular season and conference tournament champion Division regular season champion Division regular season and conference tournament champion Conference tournament champion
