= Women's Super League (disambiguation) =

Women's Super League is the highest league of women's football in England.

Women's Super League may also refer to:

== Basketball ==
- Women's Super Basketball League (Taiwan)
- Women's Super League (basketball), Ireland

== Cricket ==
- Women's Super League (cricket), England
- Women's T20 Super League, South Africa

== Floorball ==
- Swedish Super League (women's floorball)

== Football (soccer) ==
- Swiss Women's Super League
- Super League Vrouwenvoetbal, Belgium
- Chinese Women's Super League
- Ecuadorian women's football championship or Súperliga Femenina
- Namibia Women's Super League
- Serbian SuperLiga (women)
- Primera División (women) or Superliga, a football league in Spain
- Turkish Women's Football Super League, Turkey
- Indonesia Women's League, Indonesia

== Rugby League ==
- RFL Women's Super League, the top division of the British rugby league system
- RFL Women's Super League South, an expansion league for southern rugby league clubs (2021 to 2023)

== Rugby Union ==
- Women's Super League 1, a rugby union club competition in South Africa

== Volleyball ==
- Brazilian Women's Volleyball Super League
- Chinese Volleyball Super League
- Russian Women's Volleyball Super League
- Superliga Femenina de Voleibol, Spain
- Philippine Super Liga

== See also ==
- Northern Super League, a women's professional soccer league in Canada
