= Horizon League women's basketball tournament =

- Conference basketball championship
- Sport: Basketball
- Conference: Horizon League
- Number of teams: 11
- Format: Single-elimination tournament
- Current stadium: Corteva Coliseum
- Current location: Indianapolis, Indiana
- Played: 1986–present
- Last contest: 2026
- Current champion: Green Bay (19th)
- Most championships: Green Bay (19)
- Official website: Horizon League Women's Basketball

The Horizon League women's basketball tournament is the conference championship tournament in women's basketball for the Horizon League. It is a single-elimination tournament involving all of the 10 league schools, and seeding is based on regular-season records with head-to-head match-up as a tie-breaker. The winner receives the conference's automatic bid to the NCAA women's basketball tournament.

In the first round, the #7 seed faces off against the #10 and the #8 faces off against the #9. The #1 and #2 seeds play the winner of those games in the quarterfinals, while the #3 seed faces off against the #6 seed and the #4 seed faces off against the #5 seed.

The tournament has been held since 1989.

== Results ==
Year	Champions	Score	Runner-up	Championship Venue
1989	Notre Dame (1)	75–53	Loyola Chicago	Dayton, Ohio
1990	Notre Dame (2)	67–66	Butler	Dayton, Ohio
1991	Notre Dame (3)	62–52	Butler	Dayton, Ohio
1992	Notre Dame (4)	59–54	Xavier	Cincinnati, Ohio
1993	Xavier (1)	82–72	Butler	South Bend, Indiana
1994	Notre Dame (5)	72–63	Xavier	Indianapolis, Indiana
1995	Northern Illinois (1)	80–77 (OT)	La Salle	DeKalb, Illinois
1996	Butler (1)	56–53	Green Bay	Green Bay, Wisconsin
1997	Detroit (1)	63–55	Green Bay	Green Bay, Wisconsin
1998	Green Bay (1)	61–54	Butler	Indianapolis, Indiana
1999	Green Bay (2)	74–54	Detroit	Cleveland, Ohio
2000	Green Bay (3)	79–72	Cleveland State	Detroit, Michigan
2001	Milwaukee (1)	77–62	Green Bay	Chicago, Illinois
2002	Green Bay (4)	72–63	Detroit	Chicago, Illinois
2003	Green Bay (5)	83–59	Detroit	Green Bay, Wisconsin
2004	Green Bay (6)	66–54	Detroit	Milwaukee, Wisconsin
2005	Green Bay (7)	58–48	Wright State	Dayton, Ohio
2006	Milwaukee (2)	71–63	UIC	Milwaukee, Wisconsin
2007	Green Bay (8)	91–64	Butler	Green Bay, Wisconsin
2008	Cleveland State (1)	70–56	Wright State	Green Bay, Wisconsin
2009	Green Bay (9)	65–41	Milwaukee	Green Bay, Wisconsin
2010	Cleveland State (2)	66–57	Butler	Green Bay, Wisconsin
2011	Green Bay (10)	74–63	Butler	Green Bay, Wisconsin
2012	Green Bay (11)	66–53	Detroit	Green Bay, Wisconsin
2013	Green Bay (12)	54–38	Loyola Chicago	Green Bay, Wisconsin
2014	Wright State (1)	88–69	Green Bay	Green Bay, Wisconsin
2015	Green Bay (13)	86–77 (OT)	Wright State	Green Bay, Wisconsin
2016	Green Bay (14)	64–32	Milwaukee	Green Bay, Wisconsin
2017	Green Bay (15)	64–52	Detroit	Detroit, Michigan
2018	Green Bay (16)	62–44	Wright State	Detroit, Michigan
2019	Wright State (2)	55–53	Green Bay	Detroit, Michigan
2020	IUPUI (1)	51–37	Green Bay	Indianapolis, Indiana
2021	Wright State (3)	53–41	IUPUI	Indianapolis, Indiana
2022	IUPUI (2)	61–54	Cleveland State	Indianapolis, Indiana
2023	Cleveland State (3)	73–61	Green Bay	Indianapolis, Indiana
2024	Green Bay (17)	64–40	Cleveland State	Indianapolis, Indiana
2025	Green Bay (18)	76-63	Purdue Fort Wayne	Indianapolis, Indiana
2026	Green Bay (19)	57-49	Youngstown State	Indianapolis, Indiana

== Champions ==
School	Titles	Years
Green Bay	19	1998, 1999, 2000, 2002, 2003, 2004, 2005, 2007, 2009, 2011, 2012, 2013, 2015, 2016, 2017, 2018, 2024, 2025, 2026
Notre Dame	5	1989, 1990, 1991, 1992, 1994
Cleveland State	3	2008, 2010, 2023
Wright State	3	2014, 2019, 2021
IU Indy	2	2020, 2022
Milwaukee	2	2001, 2006
Detroit Mercy	1	1997
Butler	1	1996
Northern Illinois	1	1995
Xavier	1	1993

- Northern Kentucky, Oakland, Purdue Fort Wayne, Robert Morris, and Youngstown State have not yet won a Horizon League tournament.
- Dayton, Duquesne, Evansville, Illinois Chicago, La Salle, Loyola Chicago, Marquette, Saint Louis, and Valparaiso never won the tournament as Horizon League members.
- Schools highlighted in pink are former Horizon League members.
- Northern Illinois, a former member that will return to the Horizon League in 2026, is highlighted in light blue.

== See also ==
- Horizon League men's basketball tournament
