= 2024–25 Women's Super League (basketball) =

Women's basketball league in Ireland

Women's Super League
- Season: 2024–25
- Dates: Regular season: 5 October 2024 – 16 March 2025; Play Offs: 23 March – 13 April 2025
- Teams: 10

Finals
- Champions: Killester (2nd title)
- Runners-up: Utility Trust St. Paul's
- Finals MVP: (United States) Destiny Strother

Statistical leaders
Points	(United States) Shannon Powell	24.7
Rebounds	(United States) Shannon Powell	12.7
Assists	(Republic of Ireland) Aine Mckenna	6.0
Steals	(Republic of Ireland) Maeve Phelan	5.3
Blocks	(United States) Brady Shannon	3.0

The 2024–25 Women's Super League (or Domino’s Women’s Super League for sponsorship reasons) is the 47th season of the top division women's basketball league in Ireland since its establishment in 1978. It starts in October 2024 with the first round of the regular season and ends in May 2025.

Killester are the defending champions.

Killester won their second title after beating Utility Trust St. Paul's in the final.

== Format ==
Each team plays each other twice. The top eight teams qualify for the play offs where every round is held as a one off game.

== Regular season ==
Pos	Team	Pld	W	L	PF	PA	PD	Pts	Qualification
1	SETU Waterford Wildcats	18	15	3	1441	1341	+100	45	Play Offs
2	FloMAX Liffey Celtics	18	13	5	1344	1134	+210	39	Play Offs
3	Killester	18	12	6	1431	1228	+203	36	Play Offs
4	Trinity Meteors	18	10	8	1384	1198	+186	30	Play Offs
5	Midlands Park Portlaoise Panthers	18	9	9	1184	1228	−44	27 (Note: Midlands Park Portlaoise Panthers 143–140 Gurranabraher Credit Union Brunell)	Play Offs
6	Gurranabraher Credit Union Brunell	18	9	9	1408	1327	+81	27	Play Offs
7	The Address UCC Glanmire	18	8	10	1363	1330	+33	24	Play Offs
8	Utility Trust St. Paul's	18	7	11	1222	1275	−53	21	Play Offs
9	Catalyst Fr. Mathews	18	6	12	1185	1270	−85	18	
10	University of Galway Mystics	18	1	17	970	1601	−631	3	Relegation

Source: National League
Rules for classification: 1) Points; 2) Points difference; 3) Points scored.

== Play offs ==
Quarterfinals
1	SETU Waterford Wildcats	66
8	Utility Trust St. Paul's	69
4	Trinity Meteors	80
5	Midlands Park Portlaoise Panthers	73
2	FloMAX Liffey Celtics	88
7	The Address UCC Glanmire	66
3	Killester	88
6	Gurranabraher Credit Union Brunell	80

Semifinals
8	Utility Trust St. Paul's	67
4	Trinity Meteors	64
2	FloMAX Liffey Celtics	85
3	Killester	92

Final
8	Utility Trust St. Paul's	63
3	Killester	83

Champions of Ireland

Killester
Second title
