= 2012–13 Cleveland State Vikings women's basketball team =

Intercollegiate basketball season

2012–13 Cleveland State Vikings women's basketball
- Conference: Horizon League
- Record: 13–17 (5–11 Horizon)
- Head coach: Kate Peterson Abiad
- Assistant coaches: Bernard Scott; Brittany Korth; Andrew Crane
- Home arena: Wolstein Center

2012–13 Horizon League women's basketball standings
	Conf.				Overall
Team	W		L	PCT	W		L	PCT
No. 20 Green Bay †	16	–	0	1.000	29	–	2	.935
Youngstown State	11	–	5	.688	21	–	9	.700
Loyola	10	–	6	.625	17	–	15	.531
Detroit	9	–	7	.563	17	–	13	.567
Wright State	6	–	10	.375	12	–	18	.400
Milwaukee	5	–	11	.313	9	–	20	.310
Cleveland State	5	–	11	.313	13	–	17	.433
Valparaiso	5	–	11	.313	11	–	20	.355
UIC	5	–	11	.313	9	–	21	.300
† 2013 Horizon League Tournament winner As of March 18, 2013; Rankings from AP poll

The 2012–13 Cleveland State Vikings women's basketball team represented Cleveland State University in the 2012–13 NCAA Division I women's basketball season. Their head coach was Kate Peterson Abiad. The Vikings played their home games at the Wolstein Center and were members of the Horizon League. It was the 40th season of Cleveland State women's basketball. Last year they finished the season 12–19, 6–12 in Horizon League play to finish seventh overall.

== Preseason ==
The preseason Horizon League Coaches' Poll picked the Vikings to finish fifth.

== Regular season ==
Shalonda Winton was named to the 2012 Nugget Classic All-Tournament Team. On December 8, 2012, Cleveland State recorded their first victory over Miami (OH) in program history. On the same night Shalonda Winton also recorded just the sixth triple double in program history. On December 30, 2012, Shalonda Winton recorded another triple double against Lake Erie College.

== Roster ==
2012–13 Cleveland State Vikings women's basketball team
Players
Coaches

Pos.	#	Name	Height	Year	Previous school	Hometown
G	4	Adesuwa Aideyman	5 ft 7 in (1.7 m)	Fr	Reynoldsburg	Reynoldsburg, Ohio
G	15	Cori Coleman	5 ft 8 in (1.73 m)	So	Murry Bergtraum	Springfield Gardens, New York
G	23	Jasmine Flanagan	5 ft 5 in (1.65 m)	Fr	Centennial	Corona, California
F	1	Imani Gordon	5 ft 10 in (1.78 m)	So	Firestone	Akron, Ohio
G	21	Kiersten Green	5 ft 5 in (1.65 m)	So	Manheim Township	Lancaster, Pennsylvania
F	32	Nafeshia Holifield	6 ft 0 in (1.83 m)	Fr	Milwaukee Vincent	Wisconsin, Milwaukee
G	33	Brandee Kelly	6 ft 0 in (1.83 m)	Jr	Beaumont	St. Louis, Missouri
G	30	Honesty King	5 ft 4 in (1.63 m)	Sr	Elyria	Lorain, Ohio
F	5	Allison Mitchell	5 ft 9 in (1.75 m)	Fr	South Point	South Point, Ohio
F	14	Kaila Montgomery	6 ft 1 in (1.85 m)	Sr	Waterloo Collegiate Institute	Waterloo, Ontario
F	40	Haley Schmitt	6 ft 1 in (1.85 m)	Jr	Gahanna Lincoln	Gahanna, Ohio
F	20	Shalonda Winton	5 ft 11 in (1.8 m)	Sr	Westinghouse	Pittsburgh, Pennsylvania
G	2	Tess Zufall	5 ft 8 in (1.73 m)	So	Greensburg Central Catholic	Slickville, Pennsylvania

Head coach

- Kate Peterson Abiad (UW–Stevens Point)

Assistant coach(es)

- Bernard Scott (Toledo)
- Brittany Korth (Cleveland State)
- Andrew Crane (Dubuque)

Legend

- (C) Team captain
- (S) Suspended
- (I) Ineligible
- (W) Walk-on
- Injured
- Current redshirt

Roster
Last update: 22 September 2012

Source: Cleveland State Women's Basketball Roster

== Schedule ==
Date time, TV	Rank^{#}	Opponent^{#}	Result	Record	High points	High rebounds	High assists	Site (attendance) city, state
Exhibition
Oct. 31*; 7:00 pm		Walsh	W 83–67	1–0	26 – Winton	13 – Winton	4 – Winton	Wolstein Center (224); Cleveland, OH
Nov. 4*; 2:00 pm		Ursuline	W 66–33	2–0	15 – Winton	8 – Winton	4 – Green	Wolstein Center (N/A); Cleveland, OH
Regular Season
Nov. 9*; 5:00 pm		South Dakota	W 60–46	1–0	22 – Winton	10 – Winton	4 – Flanagan	Wolstein Center (1,018); Cleveland, OH
Nov. 13*; 7:00 pm		at Ohio	L 56–63	1–1	24 – Winton	15 – Winton	3 – Green	Convocation Center (581); Athens, OH
Nov. 18*; 3:00 pm		at Illinois	L 64–83	1–2	24 – Winton	18 – Gordon	3 – Green, Winton	Assembly Hall (1,612); Champaign, IL
Nov. 23*; 5:00 pm		at Nevada	L 79–86	1–3	31 – Winton	17 – Winton	5 – Winton	Lawlor Events Center (1,142); Reno, NV
Nov. 24*; 2:00 pm		vs. Santa Clara	L 71–82	1–4	23 – Winton	6 – Gordon	5 – Green	Lawlor Events Center (N/A); Reno, NV
Nov. 28*; 7:00 pm		Virginia Commonwealth	W 68–57	2–4	17 – Winton	12 – Winton	5 – Winton	Wolstein Center (181); Cleveland, OH
Dec. 2*; 2:00 pm		at Indiana	W 69–58	3–4	23 – Winton	8 – Gordon	9 – Winton	Assembly Hall (2,125); Bloomington, IN
Dec. 8*; 2:00 pm		Miami (OH)	W 87–75	4–4	29 – Winton	14 – Winton	11 – Winton	Wolstein Center (475); Cleveland, OH
Dec. 16*; 3:00 pm		at Tennessee State	W 66–59	5–4	17 – Winton	7 – Hess	6 – Winton	Gentry Complex (397); Nashville, TN
Dec. 18*; 7:00 pm		Mississippi	W 67–55	6–4	20 – Coleman	9 – Winton	3 – Coleman, Winton	Wolstein Center (203); Cleveland, OH
Dec. 22*; 2:00 pm		New Hampshire	W 58–47	7–4	22 – Winton	9 – Winton	4 – Green	Wolstein Center (223); Cleveland, OH
Dec. 30*; 2:00 pm		Lake Erie	W 70–51	8–4	18 – Winton	12 – Winton	11 – Winton	Wolstein Center (294); Cleveland, OH
Jan. 3*; 6:00 pm		Butler	L 54–56	8–5	15 – Winton	10 – Winton	3 – King, Winton	Wolstein Center (257); Cleveland, OH
Jan. 9; 6:00 pm		at Illinois–Chicago	W 73–69 ^{OT}	9–5 (1–0)	25 – Winton	15 – Winton	8 – Green	UIC Pavilion (165); Chicago, IL
Jan. 12; 2:00 pm		Detroit	W 77–66	10–5 (2–0)	32 – Winton	10 – Winton	7 – Winton	Wolstein Center (637); Cleveland, OH
Jan. 17; 7:00 pm		Green Bay	L 49–52	10–6 (2–1)	13 – Winton	12 – Winton	4 – Winton	Wolstein Center (257); Cleveland, OH
Jan. 19; 2:00 pm		Milwaukee	L 60–63	10–7 (2–2)	22 – Winton	8 – Holifield, Winton	4 – King, Winton	Wolstein Center (235); Cleveland, OH
Jan. 24; 7:00 pm		Youngstown State	L 63–72	10–8 (2–3)	16 – Coleman	9 – Winton	5 – King	Wolstein Center (236); Cleveland, OH
Jan. 31; 7:00 pm		at Detroit	L 77–96	10–9 (2–4)	25 – Green	10 – Coleman	4 – Coleman	Calihan Hall (237); Detroit, MI
Feb. 2; 2:35 pm		at Valparaiso	L 84–92 ^{OT}	10–10 (2–5)	28 – Winton	10 – Gordon	4 – Green	Athletics–Recreation Center (575); Valparaiso, IN
Feb. 7; 7:00 pm		Wright State	W 68–63	11–10 (3–5)	24 – Winton	9 – Winton	4 – Coleman, Green, Gordon	Wolstein Center (153); Cleveland, OH
Feb. 9; 3:00 pm		at Loyola–Chicago	L 78–79	11–11 (3–6)	25 – Winton	10 – Winton	6 – Winton	Joseph J. Gentile Arena (317); Chicago, IL
Feb. 11; 7:00 pm		Illinois–Chicago	W 75–69	12–11 (4–6)	32 – Winton	9 – Winton	5 – Green	Wolstein Center (135); Cleveland, OH
Feb. 14; 8:00 pm		at Green Bay	L 51–88	12–12 (4–7)	21 – Winton	11 – Winton	4 – Green, Winton	Kress Events Center (2,056); Green Bay, WI
Feb. 16; 3:00 pm		at Milwaukee	L 72–73	12–13 (4–8)	24 – Winton	9 – Winton	4 – Coleman, Gordon	Klotsche Center (1,016); Milwaukee, WI
Feb. 21; 7:05 pm		at Youngstown State	L 69–73	12–14 (4–9)	20 – Winton	9 – Winton	3 – Schmitt, Winton	Beeghly Center (1,065); Youngstown, OH
Feb. 25; 7:00 pm		Loyola–Chicago	L 67–72	12–15 (4–10)	18 – Winton	10 – Winton	4 – Winton	Wolstein Center (213); Cleveland, OH
Mar. 2; 2:00 pm		Valparaiso	W 58–54	13–15 (5–10)	21 – Winton	12 – Winton	4 – Green	Wolstein Center (358); Cleveland, OH
Mar. 7; 7:00 pm		at Wright State	L 53–61	13–16 (5–11)	15 – Winton	16 – Winton	3 – Green	Nutter Center (631); Fairborn, OH
Horizon League Tournament
Mar. 13*; 7:05 pm		at Youngstown State	L 62–69	13–17	19 – Winton	15 – Winton	7 – Green	Beeghly Center (1,648); Youngstown, OH
*Non-conference game. ^{#}Rankings from Coaches' Poll. (#) Tournament seedings in parentheses. All times are in Eastern Time..

== Rankings ==
Ranking movements Legend: — = Not ranked
	Week																			
Poll	Pre	1	2	3	4	5	6	7	8	9	10	11	12	13	14	15	16	17	18	Final
AP	—	—																		
Coaches	—	—																		
Mid-Major		—																		
