= 2017–18 Green Bay Phoenix women's basketball team =

Intercollegiate basketball season

2017–18 Green Bay Phoenix women's basketball

Horizon League regular-season and tournament champions

NCAA women's tournament, first round
- Conference: Horizon League

Ranking
- AP: No. 21
- Record: 29–4 (16–2 Horizon)
- Head coach: Kevin Borseth (15th season)
- Assistant coaches: Amanda Leonhard-Perry; Sarah Bronk; Megan Vogel
- Home arena: Kress Events Center

2017–18 Horizon League women's basketball standings
	Conf.				Overall
Team	W		L	PCT	W		L	PCT
No. 21 Green Bay †	16	–	2	.889	29	–	4	.879
IUPUI	13	–	5	.722	22	–	10	.688
Wright State	12	–	6	.667	23	–	11	.676
Milwaukee	11	–	7	.611	21	–	12	.636
Cleveland State	11	–	7	.611	19	–	11	.633
Youngstown State	11	–	7	.611	16	–	16	.500
Oakland	7	–	11	.389	15	–	16	.484
Northern Kentucky	6	–	12	.333	9	–	22	.290
Detroit	2	–	16	.111	2	–	28	.067
UIC	1	–	17	.056	8	–	22	.267
† 2018 Horizon League Tournament winner As of 18 March 2018; Rankings from AP poll

The 2017–18 Green Bay Phoenix women's basketball team represented the University of Wisconsin–Green Bay in the 2017–18 NCAA Division I women's basketball season. The Phoenix, led by head coach Kevin Borseth, in the sixth year of his current stint and 15th year overall at Green Bay, played their home games at the Kress Events Center in Green Bay, Wisconsin and were members of the Horizon League. It was the 39th season of Green Bay women's basketball. The Phoenix finished the season 29–4, 16–2 in Horizon League play, to win the Horizon League regular-season and tournament titles to earn an automatic to the NCAA women's tournament. They lost to Minnesota in the first round.

== Roster ==
2017–18 Green Bay Phoenix women's basketball team
Players
Coaches

Pos.	#	Name	Height	Year	Hometown
G	1	Jen Wellnitz	5 ft 8 in (1.73 m)	RS Jr	South Wayne, WI
G	3	Frankie Wurtz	5 ft 8 in (1.73 m)	So	Kimberly, WI
G	4	Caitlyn Hibner	6 ft 0 in (1.83 m)	So	Portage, WI
G	5	Laken James	5 ft 9 in (1.75 m)	RS Jr	Oconto, WI
G	10	Anna Brecht	6 ft 0 in (1.83 m)	Fr	Sioux Falls, SD
G	14	Meghan Pingel	5 ft 8 in (1.73 m)	RS Fr	Sun Prairie, WI
G/F	21	Jessica Lindstrom	6 ft 1 in (1.85 m)	Sr	Superior, WI
G	24	Allie LeClaire	5 ft 10 in (1.78 m)	Sr	Green Bay, WI
G/F	25	Lyndsey Robson	6 ft 0 in (1.83 m)	Fr	Burnsville, MN
F	32	Karly Murphy	6 ft 1 in (1.85 m)	RS Fr	River Falls, WI
G	33	Alex Luehring	6 ft 2 in (1.88 m)	Fr	Verona, WI
F/C	42	Mackenzie Wolf	6 ft 4 in (1.93 m)	RS So	Kohler, WI
F	44	Anna Dier	6 ft 0 in (1.83 m)	So	Algoma, WI
F/C	52	Madison Wolf	6 ft 3 in (1.91 m)	RS So	Kohler, WI

Head coach

- Kevin Borseth (Lake Superior State)

Assistant coach(es)

- Amanda Leonhard-Perry (Green Bay)
- Sarah Bronk (St. Thomas (MN))
- Megan Vogel (South Dakota State)

Legend

- (C) Team captain
- (S) Suspended
- (I) Ineligible
- (W) Walk-on
- Injured
- Current redshirt

Roster
Last update: April 13, 2025

== Schedule ==
Date time, TV	Rank^{#}	Opponent^{#}	Result	Record	High points	High rebounds	High assists	Site (attendance) city, state
Exhibition
October 26, 2017*; 7:00 p.m.		UW–Whitewater	W 71–34		12 – Mad. Wolf	4 – Murphy	4 – Lindstrom	Kress Events Center (1,669); Green Bay, WI
November 2, 2017*; 7:00 p.m.		Michigan Tech	W 87–49		15 – LeClaire	3 – Lindstrom	3 – 3 tied	Kress Events Center (2,031); Green Bay, WI
Non-conference regular season
November 11, 2017*; 12:00 p.m., ESPN3		Chattanooga	W 60–30	1–0	13 – LeClaire	6 – Lindstrom	8 – Wellnitz	Kress Events Center (1,908); Green Bay, WI
November 15, 2017*; 7:00 p.m.		at Wisconsin	W 67–34	2–0	19 – Hibner	9 – Lindstrom	4 – James	Kohl Center (3,495); Madison, WI
November 18, 2017*; 1:00 p.m., ESPN3		South Dakota State; Festival Foods Family Day	W 55–41	3–0	19 – Lindstrom	10 – Lindstrom	2 – 3 tied	Kress Events Center (2,026); Green Bay, WI
November 23, 2017*; 10:00 a.m.		vs. Columbia; Cancún Challenge Mayan Division	W 61–43	4–0	13 – Murphy	12 – Lindstrom	3 – LeClaire	Hard Rock Hotel Riviera Maya (982); Cancún, Mexico
November 24, 2017*; 12:30 p.m.		vs. No. 24 Arizona State; Cancún Challenge Mayan Division	W 61–48	5–0	18 – LeClaire	8 – Lindstrom	5 – LeClaire	Hard Rock Hotel Riviera Maya; Cancún, Mexico
November 25, 2017*; 10:00 a.m.		vs. No. 7 Mississippi State; Cancún Challenge Mayan Division	L 46–67	5–1	14 – Lindstrom	7 – Wurtz	3 – James	Hard Rock Hotel Riviera Maya (982); Cancún, Mexico
December 2, 2017*; 1:00 p.m., ESPN3		No. 23 Marquette	W 63–55	6–1	15 – Lindstrom	12 – Murphy	4 – Wellnitz	Kress Events Center (2,865); Green Bay, WI
December 6, 2017*; 10:00 a.m., SPEC	No. 23	at Dayton	W 75–64	7–1	29 – Lindstrom	14 – Lindstrom	6 – Wellnitz	UD Arena (8,416); Dayton, OH
December 10, 2017*; 1:00 p.m., ESPN3	No. 23	at Loyola–Chicago	W 76–39	8–1	16 – Wurtz	12 – Lindstrom	5 – Lindstrom	Joseph J. Gentile Arena (304); Chicago, IL
December 16, 2017*; 1:00 p.m., ESPN3	No. 21	Bradley	W 72–40	9–1	18 – Murphy	9 – Lindstrom	3 – LeClaire	Kress Events Center (2,239); Green Bay, WI
December 19, 2017*; 11:00 a.m.	No. 21	at Northwestern	W 63–57	10–1	22 – LeClaire	10 – Lindstrom	4 – Lindstrom	Allstate Arena (4,112); Rosemont, IL
Horizon League regular season
December 28, 2017; 3:30 p.m., ESPN3	No. 19	at Wright State	W 58–51	11–1 (1–0)	15 – 2 tied	12 – Lindstrom	5 – LeClaire	Nutter Center (814); Fairborn, OH
December 30, 2017; 12:00 p.m., ESPN3	No. 19	at Northern Kentucky	L 54–62	11–2 (1–1)	20 – Lindstrom	12 – Lindstrom	4 – 2 tied	BB&T Arena (958); Highland Heights, KY
January 6, 2018; 1:00 p.m., ESPN3		Milwaukee; Cellcom Food Drive	W 52–29	12–2 (2–1)	28 – LeClaire	10 – 2 tied	4 – Wellnitz	Kress Events Center (2,801); Green Bay, WI
January 11, 2018; 7:00 p.m., ESPN3	No. 25	Youngstown State	W 65–56	13–2 (3–1)	14 – Murphy	13 – Lindstrom	6 – Wellnitz	Kress Events Center (1,982); Green Bay, WI
January 13, 2018; 1:00 p.m., ESPN3	No. 25	Cleveland State	W 69–43	14–2 (4–1)	16 – Lindstrom	8 – Lindstrom	9 – Wellnitz	Kress Events Center (2,447); Green Bay, WI
January 15, 2018; 6:00 p.m., ESPN3	No. 23	at IUPUI	W 60–34	15–2 (5–1)	20 – LeClaire	7 – Lindstrom	4 – 2 tied	The Jungle (472); Indianapolis, IN
January 18, 2018; 6:00 p.m., ESPN3	No. 23	at Detroit	W 85–27	16–2 (6–1)	15 – Wurtz	9 – Lindstrom	6 – 2 tied	Calihan Hall (232); Detroit, MI
January 20, 2018; 2:00 p.m., ESPN3	No. 23	at Oakland	W 81–48	17–2 (7–1)	22 – Lindstrom	13 – Lindstrom	9 – Wellnitz	Athletics Center O'rena (624); Rochester, MI
January 26, 2018; 7:00 p.m., ESPN3	No. 22	UIC	W 65–36	18–2 (8–1)	13 – 2 tied	12 – Lindstrom	8 – Wellnitz	Kress Events Center (2,510); Green Bay, WI
January 28, 2018; 1:00 p.m., ESPN3	No. 22	IUPUI	W 52–45	19–2 (9–1)	22 – LeClaire	6 – Lindstrom	3 – 2 tied	Kress Events Center (2,970); Green Bay, WI
February 1, 2018; 7:00 p.m., ESPN3	No. 20	Northern Kentucky	W 58–41	20–2 (10–1)	13 – 3 tied	11 – Lindstrom	3 – 3 tied	Kress Events Center (2,308); Green Bay, WI
February 3, 2018; 1:00 p.m., ESPN3	No. 20	Wright State; Alumni Day	W 75–68	21–2 (11–1)	22 – LeClaire	10 – Hibner	7 – Wellnitz	Kress Events Center (2,950); Green Bay, WI
February 10, 2018; 2:00 p.m., ESPN3	No. 20	at Milwaukee	W 65–36	22–2 (12–1)	16 – LeClaire	6 – Hibner	5 – LeClaire	Klotsche Center (1,489); Milwaukee, WI
February 15, 2018; 6:00 p.m., ESPN3	No. 19	at Cleveland State	L 60-71	22–3 (12–2)	23 – Lindstrom	21 – Lindstrom	5 – Wellnitz	Wolstein Center (203); Cleveland, OH
February 17, 2018; 12:00 p.m., ESPN3	No. 19	at Youngstown State	W 67–42	23–3 (13–2)	21 – Lindstrom	15 – Lindstrom	4 – Lindstrom	Beeghly Center (1,360); Youngstown, OH
February 19, 2018; 4:00 p.m., ESPN3	No. 22	at UIC	W 66–37	24–3 (14–2)	22 – Lindstrom	13 – Lindstrom	5 – Wellnitz	UIC Pavilion (413); Chicago, IL
February 23, 2018; 7:00 p.m., ESPN3	No. 22	Oakland; Festival Foods Family Night	W 78–48	25–3 (15–2)	16 – Lindstrom	12 – Lindstrom	5 – Wellnitz	Kress Events Center (2,679); Green Bay, WI
February 25, 2018; 1:00 p.m., ESPN3	No. 22	Detroit	W 88–45	26–3 (16–2)	19 – Lindstrom	14 – Lindstrom	5 – Wellnitz	Kress Events Center (2,885); Green Bay, WI
Horizon League women's tournament
March 3, 2018; 1:30 p.m., ESPN3	(1) No. 21	vs. (8) Northern Kentucky; Quarterfinals	W 62–49	27–3	21 – LeClaire	12 – Lindstrom	4 – 2 tied	Little Caesars Arena; Detroit, MI
March 5, 2018; 12:00 p.m., ESPN3	(1) No. 21	vs. (5) Youngstown State; Semifinals	W 66–45	28–3	17 – Lindstrom	9 – Lindstrom	5 – LeClaire	Little Caesars Arena; Detroit, MI
March 6, 2018; 1:00 p.m., ESPNU	(1) No. 21	vs. (3) Wright State; Championship game	W 62–44	29–3	24 – LeClaire	14 – Lindstrom	8 – Wellnitz	Little Caesars Arena; Detroit, MI
2018 NCAA women's tournament
March 16, 2018*; 4:15 p.m., ESPN2	(7 S) No. 21	vs. (10 S) Minnesota; First round	L 77–89	29–4	17 – LeClaire	8 – Lindstrom	5 – Wellnitz	Matthew Knight Arena; Eugene, OR
*Non-conference game. ^{#}Rankings from AP poll. (#) Tournament seedings in parentheses. S=Spokane Region. All times are in Central.

== Rankings ==
Ranking movement Legend: ██ Increase in ranking. ██ Decrease in ranking. NR = Not ranked. RV = Received votes.
Poll	Pre	Wk 2	Wk 3	Wk 4	Wk 5	Wk 6	Wk 7	Wk 8	Wk 9	Wk 10	Wk 11	Wk 12	Wk 13	Wk 14	Wk 15	Wk 16	Wk 17	Wk 18	Wk 19	Final
AP	NR	NR	RV	RV	23	21	21	19	RV	25	23	22	20	20	19	22	21	22	22	N/A
Coaches	NR	NR	RV	RV	25	24	23	20	24	24	22	21	20	17	15	21	21	21	21	RV

== Awards and honors ==
=== Horizon League awards ===
- Defensive Player of the Year: Jen Wellnitz
- All-League First Team: Jessica Lindstrom
- All-League Second Team: Allie LeClaire
- All-Freshman Team: Karly Murphy
- All-Defensive Team: Jen Wellnitz, Jessica Lindstrom
- All-Academic Team: Jessica Lindstrom
