= Kathleen E. Christensen =

American social scientist and author

Kathleen E. Christensen is an American social scientist and author best known for her research on the changing nature of work, including remote and contingent work, as well as workplace flexibility. She currently directs the Alfred P. Sloan Foundation's Working Longer program designed to deepen scholarly and public understanding of aging Americans' work patterns.

== Biography ==
Christensen received her BS from the University of Wisconsin- Green Bay and a PhD from Pennsylvania State University.

Prior to joining the Alfred P. Sloan Foundation, Christensen was a professor of environmental psychology at the Graduate Center of City University of New York, where she was one of the first people to conduct research on remote work and contingent work.

Christensen established and led the Alfred P Sloan Foundation's program on working families, which resulted in $130 million of funding for work-family research. She is considered one of the pioneers in the field.

In 2003, Christensen launched the national workplace flexibility campaign, which set the goal of making workplace flexibility a compelling national issue and the standard of the American workplace. This campaign funded many research studies and projects related to advancing workplace flexibility over the course of a decade. The program culminated in 2010 with a White House Forum of Workplace Flexibility.

In 2010, Working Mother magazine called Christensen "the foremost strategic supporter of research and initiatives in the area of work-life"."

Christensen spoke at the 2014 White House Summit on Working Families and the 2010 White House Forum on Workplace Flexibility.

She has written op-eds that have appeared in the Washington Post, USA Today, Chicago Tribune, Philadelphia Inquirer and Atlanta Journal-Constitution.

== Publications ==
=== Books ===
- Workplace Flexibility: Realigning 20th Century Jobs for a 21st Century Workforce
- Contingent Work: American Employment Relations in Transition
- Turbulence in the American Workplace
- Women and Home-based Work: The Unspoken Contract
- The New Era of Home-based Work: Directions and Policies
