= Indigo bush =

The common name indigo bush can refer to plants in any of several genera in the legume family, including:

- Amorpha, native to North America
- Dalea
- Psorothamnus

== See also ==
- False indigo
