= Oshkosh Arena =

Small arena in Oshkosh, Wisconsin

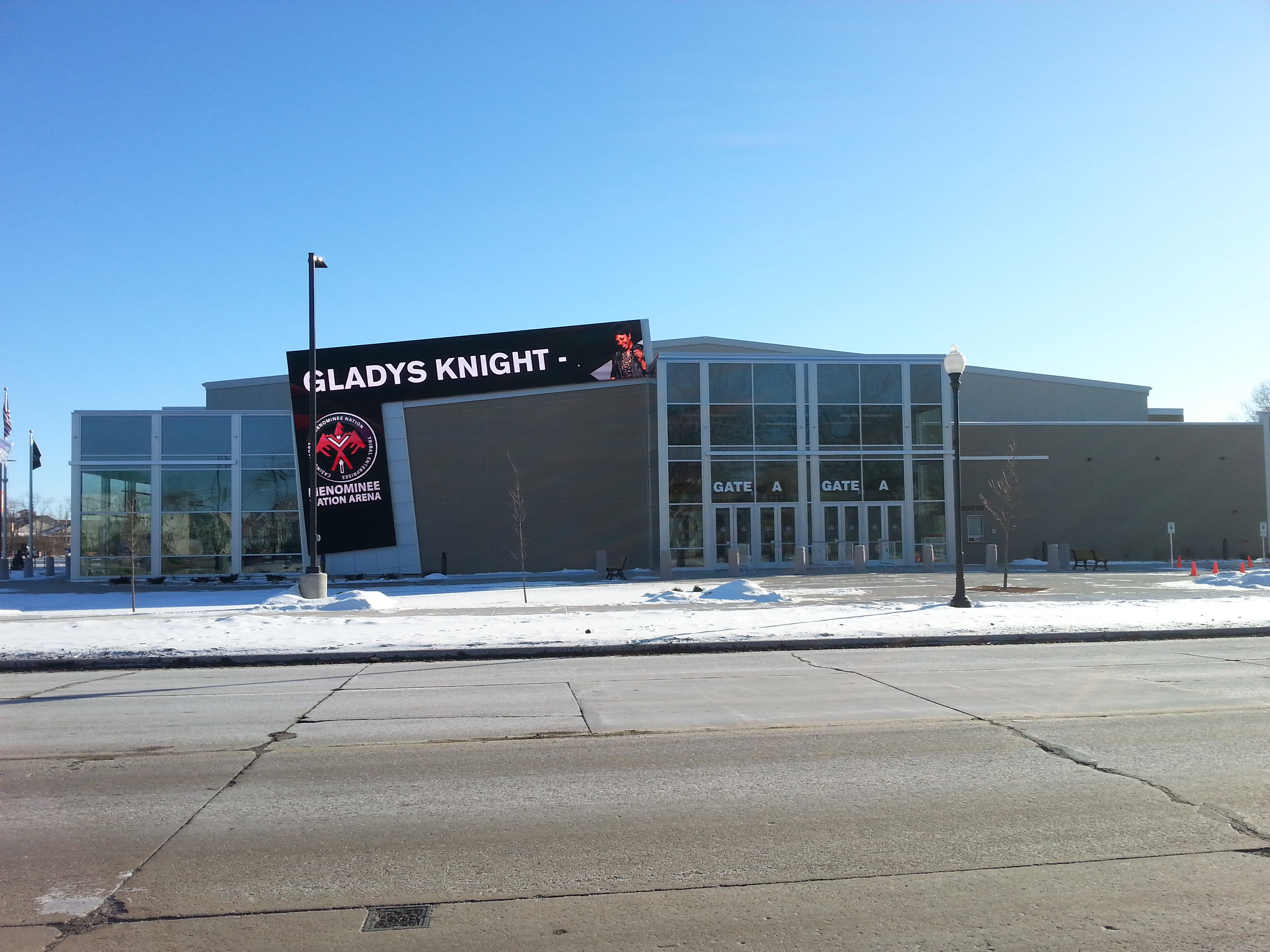
- Oshkosh Arena in 2017
- Interactive map of Oshkosh Arena
- Former names: Menominee Nation Arena (2017-2021)
- Location: 1212 South Main Street; Oshkosh, Wisconsin, United States
- Coordinates: 44°00′27″N 88°32′15″W
- Owner: Fox Valley Pro Basketball
- Operator: VenuWorks
- Capacity: 3,500
- Type: Multi-purpose arena
- Events: Music, concerts, and sporting events
- Scoreboard: Yes

Construction
- Groundbreaking: March 29, 2017
- Built: 2017
- Opened: December 1, 2017
- Cost: $15 million ($20.1 million in 2025 dollars)
- General contractor: Bayland Buildings

Tenants
- Wisconsin Herd (NBAGL) (2017–present); Wisconsin Glo (GWBA) (2019–2023); Wisconsin Aviators (AIF) (2027–present)

Website
- oshkosharena.com

Oshkosh Arena, formerly Menominee Nation Arena, is a 64,300 sq ft (5,970 m^{2}) indoor arena located in Oshkosh, in the U.S. state of Wisconsin. The facility is primarily used for basketball, but also hosts conventions and concerts. It serves as the home of the Wisconsin Herd of the NBA G League, which is affiliated with the Milwaukee Bucks of the National Basketball Association. The first event to be held at the arena, a Wisconsin Herd game, was on December 1, 2017.

== Location and design ==
The arena is located along the east side of South Main Street, on the former site of the Buckstaff Furniture Company. With a seating capacity of 3,500 spectators, the new arena broke ground on March 29, 2017, with completion slated for late November.

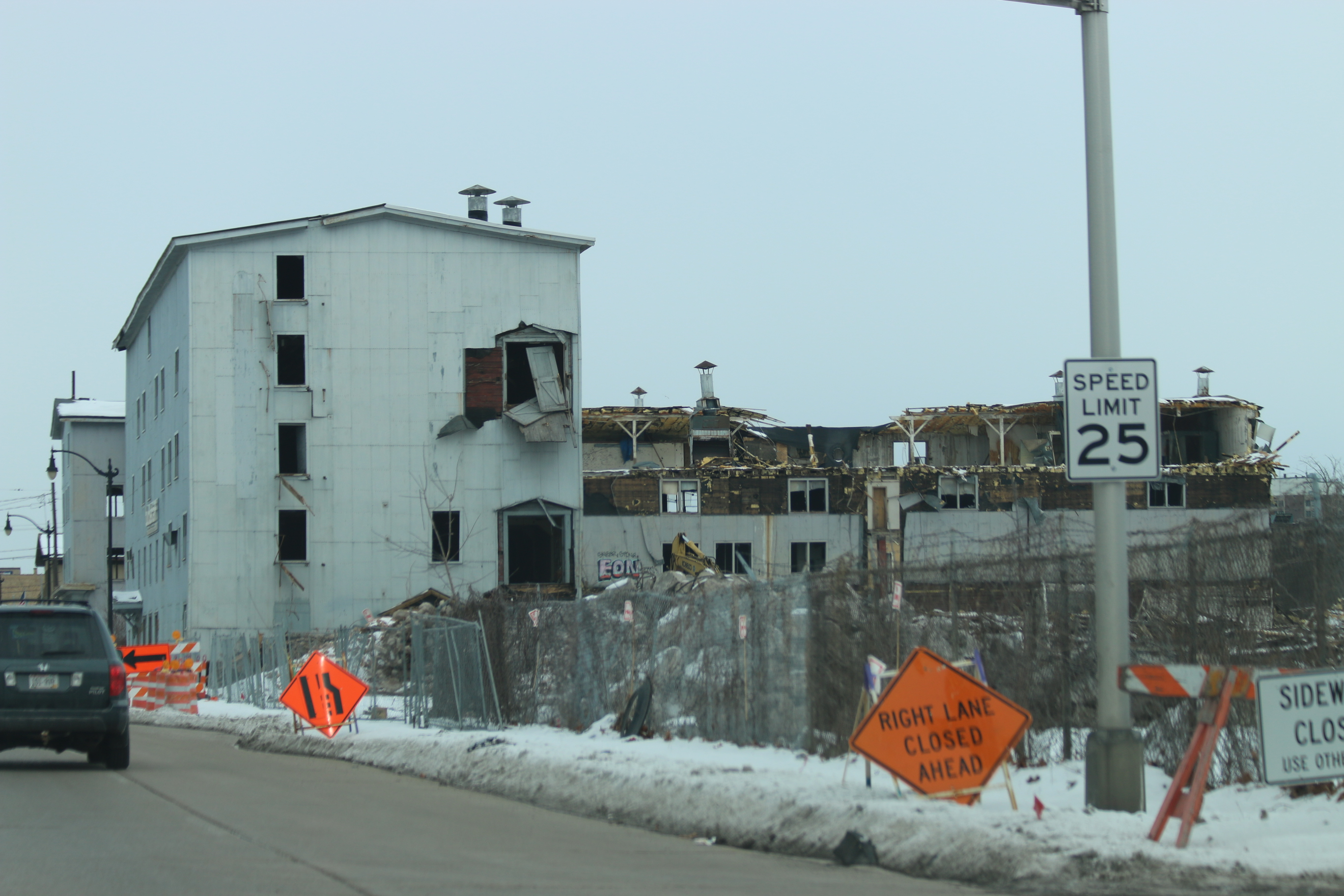
Razing the Buckstaff building in February 2017

== History ==
On January 25, 2017, the Oshkosh City Council unanimously approved the construction of the $15 million facility. The cost of the construction was privately funded, with the arena being part of a larger development plan for a new housing and commercial area called the Sawdust District, located near Pioneer Drive Park along the shores of Lake Winnebago. On June 13, 2017, the Oshkosh City Council announced that the arena was to receive an additional $250,000 in state-supported funding for improvement of the nearby roadways and infrastructures to improve transit to the facility.

On October 23, 2017, the Menominee tribe announced that they had purchased the naming rights to the arena, renaming it to Menominee Nation Arena. Terms of the deal were not disclosed.

The owner and operator of the arena, Fox Valley Pro Basketball, Inc. filed bankruptcy on August 19, 2019. In March 2021, it was announced that the Menominee tribe were ending their naming rights contract as part of their business restructuring caused by financial effects of the COVID-19 pandemic. The arena was renamed Oshkosh Arena.
