= 2013 Horizon League women's basketball tournament =

- Classification: Division I
- Season: 2012–13
- Teams: 9

The 2013 Horizon League women's basketball tournament took place at the end of the 2012–13 regular season. The tournament was won by Green Bay, who defeated Loyola in the championship game.

== Seeds ==
All Horizon League schools played in the tournament. Teams were seeded by 2012–13 Horizon League regular season record, with a tiebreaker system to seed teams with identical conference records. The top 7 teams received a bye to the quarterfinals.

== Bracket ==
First round Monday, March 11
8	Valparaiso	67
9	UIC	57

Quarterfinals; Wednesday, March 13
1	Green Bay	80
8	Valparaiso	59
4	Detroit	72
5	Wright State	56
3	Loyola	71
6	Milwaukee	54
2	Youngstown State	69
7	Cleveland State	62

Semifinals; Friday, March 15
1	Green Bay	71
4	Detroit	54
2	Youngstown State	45
3	Loyola	72

Championship; Sunday, March 17
1	Green Bay	54
3	Loyola	38

== See also ==
- Horizon League Women's Basketball Champions
