= Alfred P. Sloan Foundation =

American philanthropic nonprofit organization

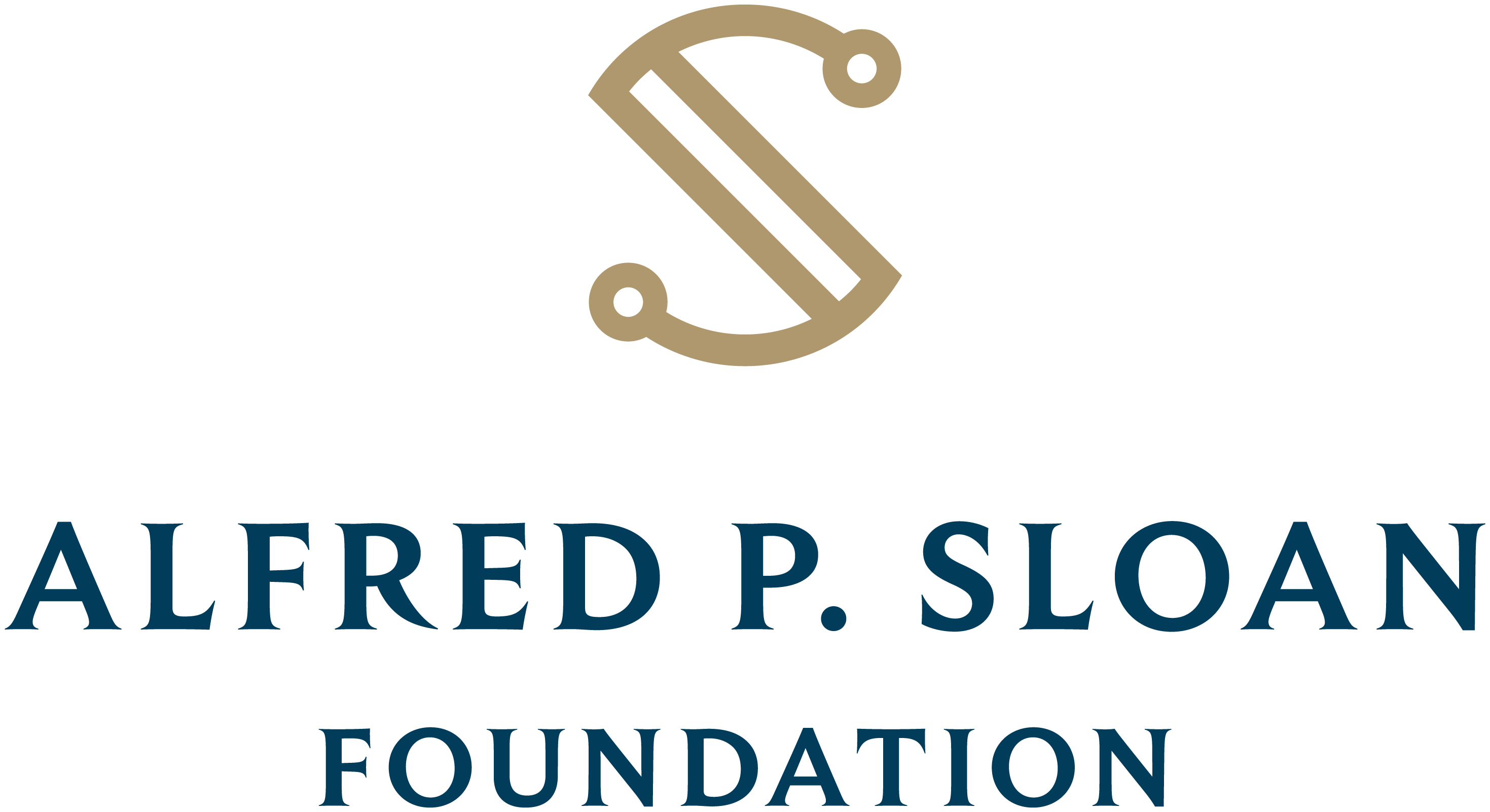
- Founded: 1934; 92 years ago
- Founder: Alfred Pritchard Sloan Jr.
- Purpose: Research and education in science, technology, engineering, mathematics and economics
- Location: New York City, New York, U.S.
- Method: Grantmaking
- Key people: Stacie Bloom (president)
- Endowment: US$2.0 billion
- Employees: 38
- Website: sloan.org

The Alfred P. Sloan Foundation is an American philanthropic nonprofit organization. It was established in 1934 by Alfred P. Sloan Jr., president and chief executive officer of General Motors.

The Sloan Foundation makes grants to support original research and broad-based education related to science, technology, and economics. The foundation is an independent entity and has no formal relationship with General Motors. As of 2024, the Sloan Foundation's assets totaled $2.2 billion.

== History ==
During the initial years of Alfred P. Sloan's presidency, the foundation devoted its resources almost exclusively to education in economics and business. Grants were made to develop materials to improve high school and college economics teaching; for preparation of and wide distribution of inexpensive pamphlets on the pressing economic and social issues of the day; for weekly radio airing of round table discussions on current topics in economics and related subjects; and for establishing a Tax Institute at the Wharton School of the University of Pennsylvania to interpret new taxes and new trends in public finance for the average citizen.

From 1936 to 1945, Harold S. Sloan, an economist and Alfred's younger brother, served as director and vice president of the foundation.

The Sloan Foundation also made many civic contributions to the foundation's home city of New York, including grants to Lincoln Center for the Performing Arts, Channel 13, New York Public Library, New York University, and the Fund for the City of New York.

Starting in 2026, Stacie Bloom assumed presidency of the foundation.

== Programs ==
The Alfred P. Sloan Foundation makes grants in seven broad subjects, known within the foundation as major program areas:

- Science,
- Economics,
- STEM Higher Education,
- Digital Information Technology,
- Public Understanding of Science, Technology & Economics,
- Working Longer,
- Energy & Environment.

The Sloan Work and Family Researchers Network supports research and education about work-family issues. The foundation also funded the national workplace flexibility campaign as part of the Working Families program led by Kathleen E. Christensen.

The Sloan Research Fellowships are annual awards given to more than 126 young researchers and university faculty, to further studies in chemistry, computational and evolutionary microbiology, computer science, economics, mathematics, neuroscience, ocean sciences and physics.

In March 2008, the foundation awarded a $3 million grant to the Wikimedia Foundation. It made additional grants in July 2011 and January 2017.

The Sloan Foundation is the primary funder of the Sloan Digital Sky Survey, a major astronomical survey that began data collection in 2000.

In 1945, the Sloan Foundation donated $4 million to launch the Sloan Kettering Cancer Institute, now the Memorial Sloan Kettering Cancer Center.

In 1950, the Sloan Foundation made a gift of more than $5 million to establish a School of Industrial Management, now known as the MIT Sloan School of Management.

In 1955, the Sloan Foundation made a gift to establish the first two-year academic program in healthcare management in the US at Cornell University, initially called the Sloan Institute of Hospital Administration and now known as the Sloan Program in Health Administration.

== Presidents ==
1. Alfred P. Sloan Jr. (1934–1961)
2. Everett Case (1962–1968)
3. Nils Y. Wessell (1969–1979)
4. Albert Rees (1979–1988)
5. Ralph E. Gomory (1989–2007)
6. Paul L. Joskow (2008–2017)
7. Adam F. Falk (2018–2025)
8. Stacie Bloom (2025–)
