= Mehryn Kraker =

American basketball player (born 1994)

No. 10 – Luleå Basket
- Position: Forward
- League: Basketligan dam

Personal information
- Born: June 5, 1994 (age 32) West Allis, Wisconsin, U.S.
- Listed height: 6 ft 0 in (1.83 m)

Career information
- High school: West Allis Central (West Allis, Wisconsin)
- College: Green Bay (2013–2017)
- WNBA draft: 2017: 3rd round, 27th overall pick
- Drafted by: Washington Mystics
- Playing career: 2017–present
- Coaching career: 2020–2021

Career history

Playing
- 2017–2019: Cadí La Seu
- 2019: Wisconsin GLO
- 2019–2020: IDK Euskotren
- 2021: Wisconsin GLO
- 2021–2022: KFUM Ostersund Basket
- 2022–present: Rockingham Flames
- 2022: Rheinland Lions
- 2023: Luleå Basket
- 2023-2024: Bendigo Spirit
- 2024-present: Luleå Basket

Coaching
- 2020–2021: Green Bay (assistant)

Career highlights
- All-NBL1 West First Team (2023); NBL1 West Golden Hands (2023); GWBA champion (2019); Horizon League Player of the Year (2017); First-team All-Horizon League (2017); 2× Second-team All-Horizon League (2015, 2016); Horizon League Tournament MVP (2016); Horizon All-Freshman Team (2014)
- Stats at Basketball Reference

Mehryn Donegan Kraker (born June 5, 1994) is an American professional basketball player for the Luleå Basket of the Basketligan dam. She played college basketball for Green Bay before being drafted by the Washington Mystics in the third round of the 2017 WNBA draft. She has since played in Spain, Sweden, Australia, Germany, and in the Global Women's Basketball Association.

== Early life ==
Kraker was born in West Allis, Wisconsin, and attended West Allis Central High School. Kraker was a four time All-Conference selection in the Greater Metro Conference, as well as its player of the year once. She was also a two-time All-Area/All-Suburban team selection by the Milwaukee Journal Sentinel, a two-time All-State selection, and a Wisconsin Basketball Coaches Association All-Star Game pick. Kraker graduated as West Allis Central's all time leader in points, assists, and steals.

== College career ==
Kraker redshirted her freshman year to ensure a full four years of eligibility. Her first season in 2013–14 saw her start 31 games of the 32-game season, where she became the first Phoenix player since Julie Wojta to score more than 30 points in a game. Kraker was also named Horizon League Freshman of the Week, and received selections to the 2014 Horizon League All-Freshman team, as well as the Horizon League All-Tournament Team. The following year, Kraker was named to the Horizon League's All-League Second Team, and led the team in scoring with 12.5 points per game. She was named again to the All-League Second Team and received Horizon League Tournament MVP honors in the 2015–16 season. Kraker was named Horizon League Player of the Year her senior year, as well as ESPN.com's Mid-Major player of the year. Kraker graduated as Green Bay's record holder for most three-pointers made in a season and career.

=== Green Bay statistics ===
Legend
GP	Games played	GS	Games started	MPG	Minutes per game
FG%	Field goal percentage	3P%	3-point field goal percentage	FT%	Free throw percentage
RPG	Rebounds per game	APG	Assists per game	SPG	Steals per game
BPG	Blocks per game	PPG	Points per game	**Bold**	Career high

Year	Team	GP	Points	FG%	3P%	FT%	RPG	APG	SPG	BPG	PPG
2012–13	Green Bay	Redshirt									
2013–14	Green Bay	31	294	47.7%	**39.7%**	63.6%	3.9	1.8	0.9	0.5	9.5
2014–15	Green Bay	33	413	46.9%	34.4%	60.3%	**4.9**	2.1	0.9	**0.7**	12.5
2015–16	Green Bay	33	383	45.4%	31.0%	58.5%	4.2	3.2	**1.5**	0.6	11.6
2016–17	Green Bay	33	**581**	**52.7%**	38.1%	**76.0%**	3.2	**3.6**	1.4	0.4	**17.6**
Career		130	1671	48.5%	35.8%	66.1%	4.1	2.7	1.2	0.5	12.9

== Professional career ==
Kraker declared for the 2017 WNBA draft, where she was selected 27th overall in the third round by the Washington Mystics. She appeared in two preseason games before being waived prior to the start of the 2017 WNBA season.

For the 2017–18 season, Kraker moved to Spain to play for Cadi La Seu in the Liga Femenina de Baloncesto. She returned to Cadi La Seu for the 2018–19 season.

After a stint with the Wisconsin GLO of the Global Women's Basketball Association (GWBA), Kraker returned to Spain for the 2019–20 season to play for IDK Euskotren.

Kraker initially renewed her contract with IDK Euskotren in June 2020 but departed the team to return to the United States as a coach.

After another stint with the Wisconsin GLO in 2021, Kraker moved to Sweden for the 2021–22 season to play for KFUM Ostersund Basket. Following the Swedish season, she moved to Australia to play for the Rockingham Flames of the NBL1 West in the 2022 season.

Kraker started the 2022–23 season in Germany with the Rheinland Lions but left in December 2022. She joined Luleå Basket in Sweden in January 2023. She then returned to the Flames for the 2023 NBL1 West season.

== Coaching career ==
Kraker spent the 2020–21 U.S. college season as an assistant coach with the Green Bay Phoenix.

== Awards and honors ==
=== High school ===
- 4x Greater Metro Conference All-Conference
- Greater Metro Conference Player of the Year
- 2x Wisconsin Basketball Coaches Association (WCBA) All-State
- 2x Milwaukee Journal Sentinel All-Area/All-Suburban
- WCBA All-Star

=== College ===
- Horizon League Player of the Year (2017)
- espnW Mid-Major Player of the Year (2017)
- Horizon League Tournament MVP (2016)
- All-Horizon League Second Team (2015, 2016)
- Horizon League All-Freshman Team (2014)
- Horizon League Freshman of the Week (11/11/2014)
- Third all-time program points (1,671)
