= University of Wisconsin–Green Bay =

Public university in Green Bay, Wisconsin, U.S.

- Motto: Ad Scientiam Renovandam (Latin)
- Motto in English: "To Update Science"
- Type: Public university
- Established: 1965; 61 years ago
- Parent institution: University of Wisconsin System
- Accreditation: HLC
- Academic affiliations: CUMU; Space-grant
- Endowment: $61.8 million (2025)
- Chancellor: Michael Alexander
- Students: 9,870 (all four campuses)
- Undergraduates: 9,278
- Postgraduates: 592
- Location: Green Bay, Wisconsin, United States; 44.53°N 87.92083°W
- Campus: 700 acres (2.8 km^{2}); Midsize city
- Other campuses: Manitowoc; Marinette; Sheboygan
- Newspaper: The Fourth Estate
- Colors: Green and white
- Nickname: Phoenix
- Sporting affiliations: NCAA Division I – Horizon; CCSA
- Mascot: Phlash the Phoenix
- Website: www.uwgb.edu

The University of Wisconsin–Green Bay (UW–Green Bay, UWGB, or Green Bay) is a public university in Green Bay, Wisconsin, United States. Founded in 1965, it is part of the University of Wisconsin System. As of fall 2024, student enrollment had risen to 11,188, making the school the fastest growing university in Wisconsin.

Since its founding, the school has had an environmental sustainability emphasis; it was nicknamed "Eco U" in 1971 by Newsweek. It offers associate, bachelor's, and master's degree programs, as well as a doctoral program, First Nations Ed.D. The university had regional campuses in Marinette, Manitowoc, and Sheboygan, Wisconsin. The university's mascot is the phoenix.

== History ==
By 1958, the University of Wisconsin–Extension's Green Bay center had grown to 500 students, the second-largest of UW–Extension's eight freshman-sophomore centers. It grew to become the largest by 1965. Demand soon grew for a full-fledged four-year campus serving northeastern Wisconsin. In 1963, the Coordinating Committee for Higher Education unanimously recommended building a new university in the Fox Valley. Governor Warren Knowles, who was somewhat cool to the idea, proposed that the freshman-sophomore campuses in Green Bay and Kenosha be expanded to four-year institutions (the Kenosha institution eventually became the University of Wisconsin–Parkside). The bill was signed into law on September 2, 1965.

UW–Green Bay officially came into being in the fall of 1968, with the first classes being held at the Deckner Center (now Anne Sullivan Elementary School), home of the former Green Bay extension center. It moved to its current location in the fall of 1969.

In 2018, as part of a UW System restructuring that merged 13 two-year schools with seven four year schools, UW–Green Bay took responsibility for the former UW–Marinette, UW–Sheboygan, and UW–Manitowoc branches, turning them into University of Wisconsin–Green Bay Marinette, Sheboygan, and Manitowoc campuses. In January 2024, Chancellor Alexander announced that the Marinette campus would move all instruction online.

== Campus ==
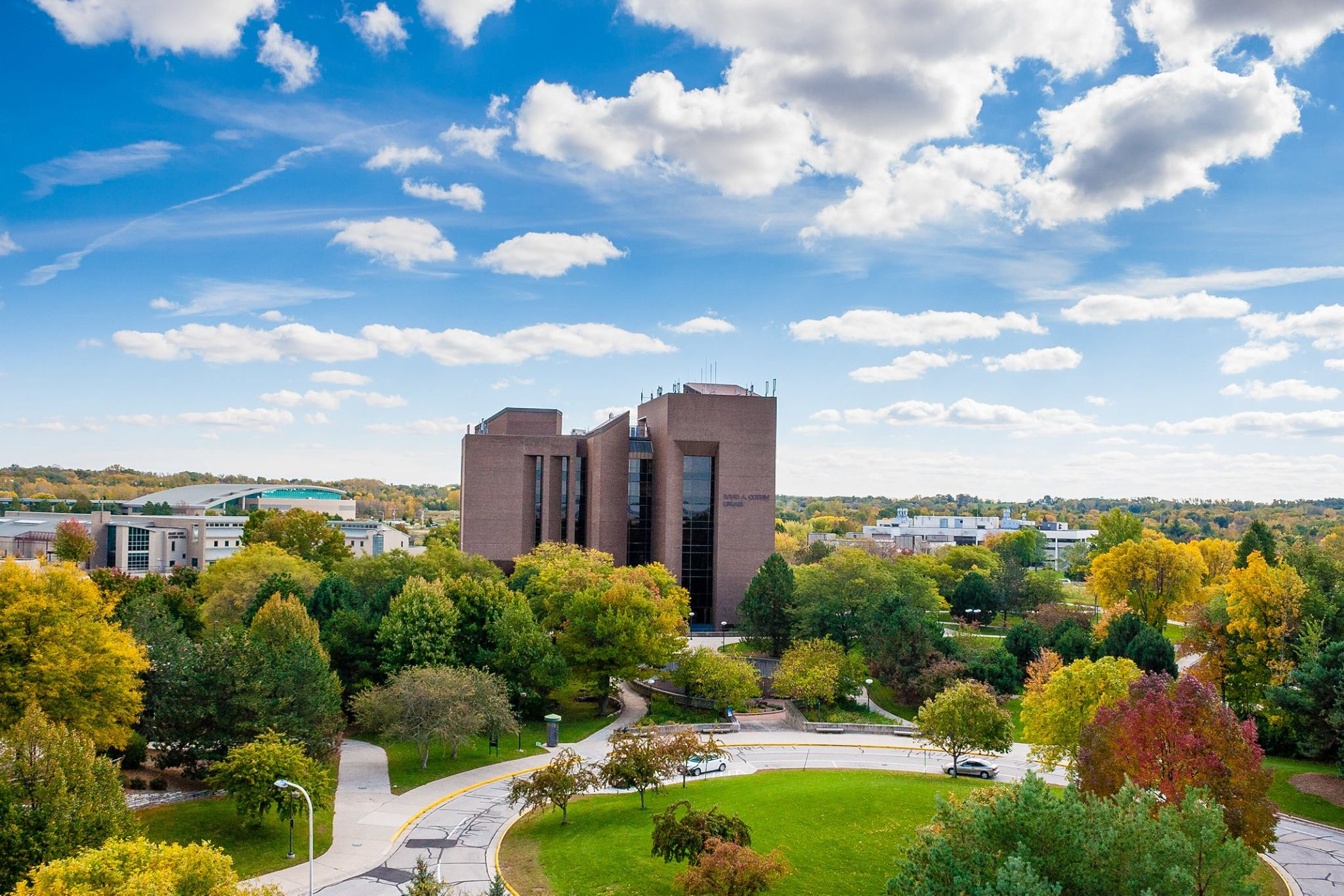
The UW-Green Bay campus, including Cofrin Library

The 700-acre campus is on the northeast side of the city of Green Bay, overlooking Lake Michigan's Green Bay body of water. Much of the campus is composed of natural areas, with the campus bordered on one side by the bay and on the other by the Niagara Escarpment. A system of circular roads (North, East, and South Circle Drives) surrounds the central campus and are the main thoroughfares for traffic on campus, in addition to a few smaller roads that connect the Circle Drives with parking lots. The Cofrin Memorial Arboretum forms a natural boundary of 290 acres encircling the campus. It offers recreation, field trips, and research projects. The purpose of the Arboretum is to restore and preserve some of Wisconsin's native ecological communities and to offer an opportunity to enjoy and appreciate nature. It has more than six miles of trails open to the public.

The David A. Cofrin Library sits at the heart of campus, and is one of the tallest buildings in the Green Bay area. Adjacent to the library in the central part of campus are all academic buildings, the University Union (UW–Green Bay's student union), and the Weidner Center for the Performing Arts. All of the university's residential buildings (with the exception of a female-only house adjacent to campus) are in the northeast part of campus, and include traditional residence halls, shared-bedroom apartments, and newer private bedroom apartments. The Richard Mauthe Center (formerly known as the Ecumenical Center) is just south of the residence halls and serves as the campus' religious center. The Mauthe Center is one of two buildings on campus that are run semi-independently of the university, the other being the Weidner Center. The Kress Events Center and various athletic fields dominate the southeast part of campus. A university-owned golf course, the Shorewood Golf Course, takes up the majority of the northern side of campus.

Across Nicolet Drive, the road that forms the western border of the university, are two university-owned properties, Lambeau Cottage and Communiversity Park. Lambeau Cottage was owned by Green Bay Packers founder Curly Lambeau from 1941 to 1956, and was acquired by the state in 1978. The building served many purposes, including a retreat center and headquarters for the sailing team, but fell into disrepair over time. In 2005, an alumnus provided a donation to restore the Lambeau Cottage, and it again finds itself typically used for university retreats. Communiversity Park is a small park adjacent to the Lambeau Cottage and overlooks the bay.

=== Facilities ===
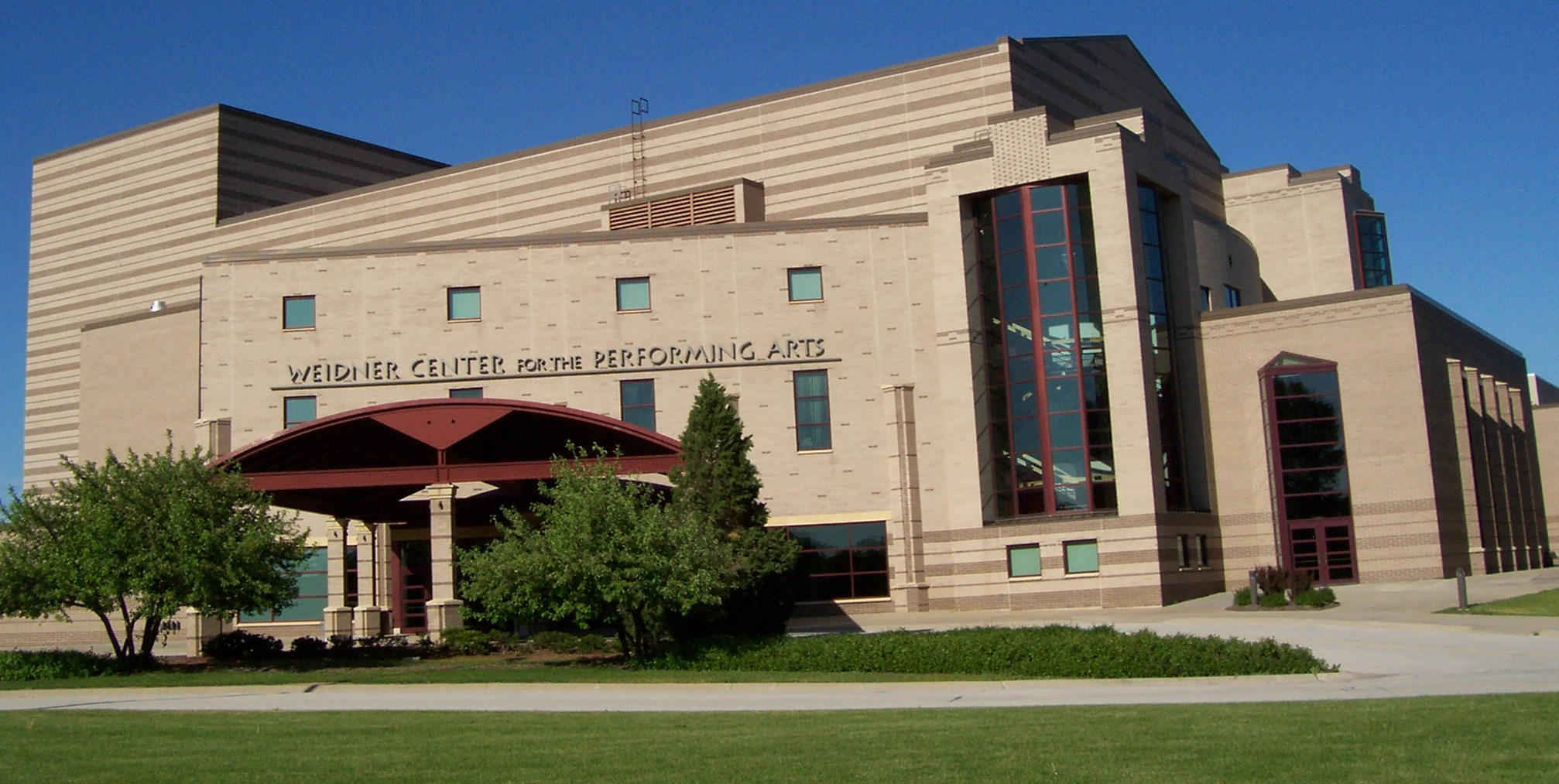
Weidner Center

Cofrin Memorial Arboretum

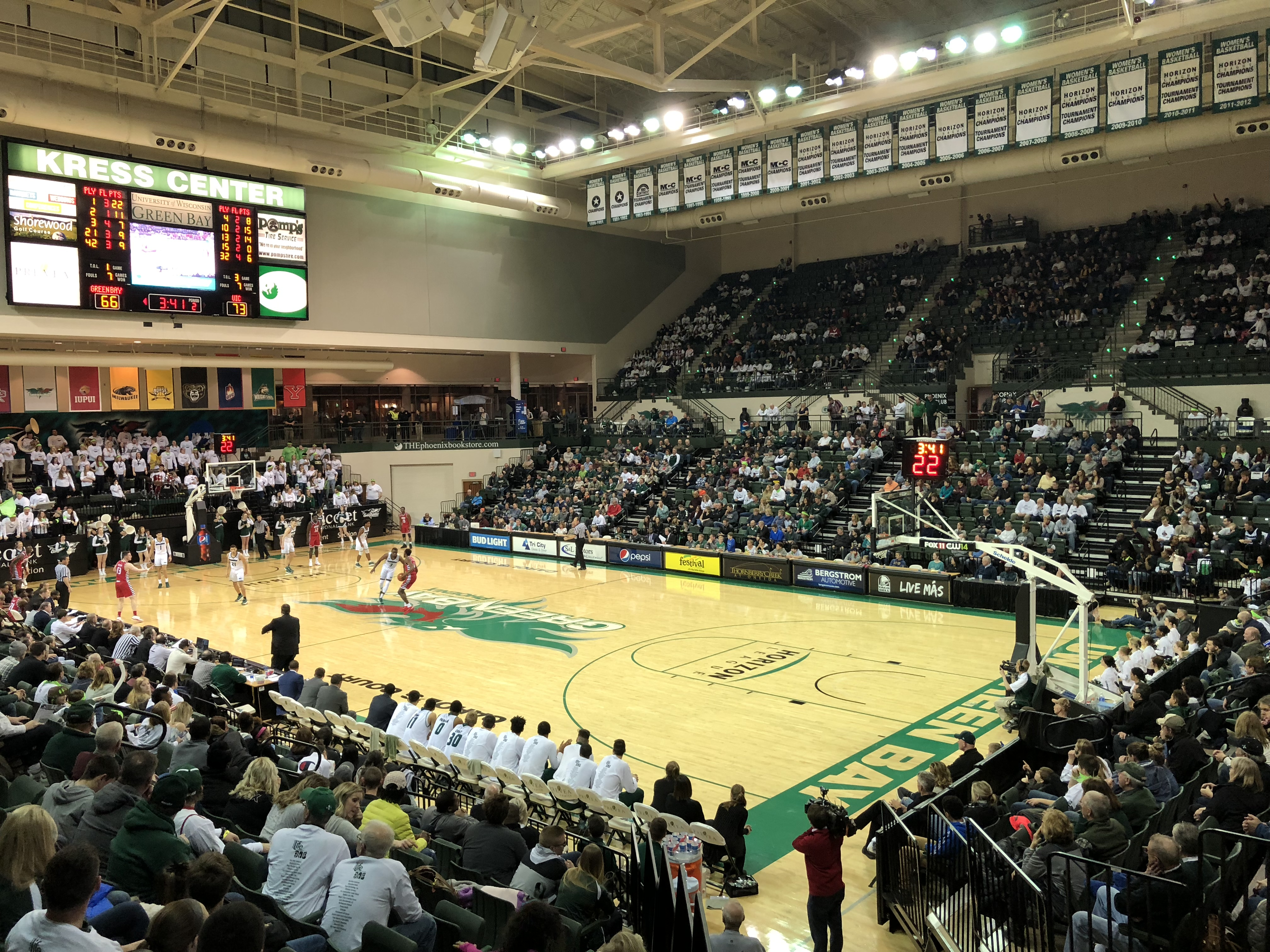
Kress Events Center

The Weidner Center for the Performing Arts contains the 2,000-seat Cofrin Family Hall, the 200-seat Fort Howard Hall for recitals, the 99-seat-in-the-round Jean Weidner Theatre, and a dance studio.

The Cofrin Library has a collection of more than one million items, and the Special Collections Department contains historical records of northeastern Wisconsin, genealogical records, and a local business archives collection. The library's top floor is home to university administration as well as viewpoints for notable landmarks within the area.

The Kress Events Center is the host for Phoenix Athletics, concerts, and university-wide events and is the headquarters for workouts, weight training, and intramural sports. The facility has an athletics training room, weight rooms, cardio deck, pool, racquetball courts, a climbing tower, outdoor playing fields, and a multipurpose gymnasium for basketball, volleyball and indoor tennis.

Joseph LeMieux was a stonemason who built lighthouses on the Great Lakes. His brother-in-law, Fabian LaPlant, was a carpenter. Together they teamed to build the LeMieux Chapel.

=== Student housing ===
UW–Green Bay has 28 residential buildings, including traditional residence halls, apartment style residence halls, and student apartments. Approximately 2,000 students live on campus.

=== Tunnel system ===
The UW–Green Bay main campus has a concourse system of underground corridors, casually referred to as "tunnels", that connect eleven of its buildings. Designed with the David A. Cofrin Library at its center, subterranean hallways branch out to Student Services, the University Union and seven academic buildings. Opposite the adjacent Theatre Hall and Studio Arts buildings that form an arts wing is a sciences wing comprises Instructional Services, Environmental Sciences and Laboratory Sciences buildings. To the west of the library are the L.G. Wood and John M. Rose Halls. Constructed in 2002, Mary Ann Cofrin Hall is the newest building in the concourse system. Campus buildings not connected by the concourse system are the residence halls, Kress Center, the Weidner Center, and the Brown County STEM and Innovation Center which broke ground September 17, 2018. In addition to helping faculty, staff and students navigate campus in adverse weather, the concourse system facilitates accessibility.

== Academics ==
Since 2016, the university comprises four colleges:

- College of Arts, Humanities and Social Sciences
- Austin E. Cofrin School of Business
- College of Health, Education and Social Welfare
- College of Science, Engineering and Technology

The College of Arts, Humanities and Social Sciences oversees the most majors of any of the university's four colleges, including all arts-related majors (both fine and performing), all humanities majors, all social science majors, the university's communication program, and the economics and information science programs.

Named for Austin E. Cofrin, a local philanthropist, the Cofrin School of Business was constituted in 2010 after Cofrin's son, David (who the campus library is named after) donated money to establish the program. Cofrin's donation was the largest for an academic program since the university's founding. The Cofrin School of Business oversees the accounting, business administration, and international business majors.

The College of Health, Education and Social Welfare oversees the university's professional programs, including education, healthcare management, social work, and the joint nursing programs that the university maintains with the nearby Bellin College of Nursing.

The College of Science, Engineering and Technology oversees all science-related majors, in addition to mathematics and the university's Engineering Technology program.

In 2021, the university's top majors by degrees granted were business administration, psychology, integrative leadership studies, human biology, and nursing for undergraduates, while the most popular graduate degrees were the master's in social work and sustainable management.

== Student life ==
The student body participates in issues regarding university governance through the Student Government Association, which consists of an executive branch, a legislative branch, and a judicial branch (the Student Court).

There are over 100 student organizations on campus, consisting of special interest clubs, honor societies, fraternities and sororities, club sports teams, and professional and academic groups.

== Athletics ==
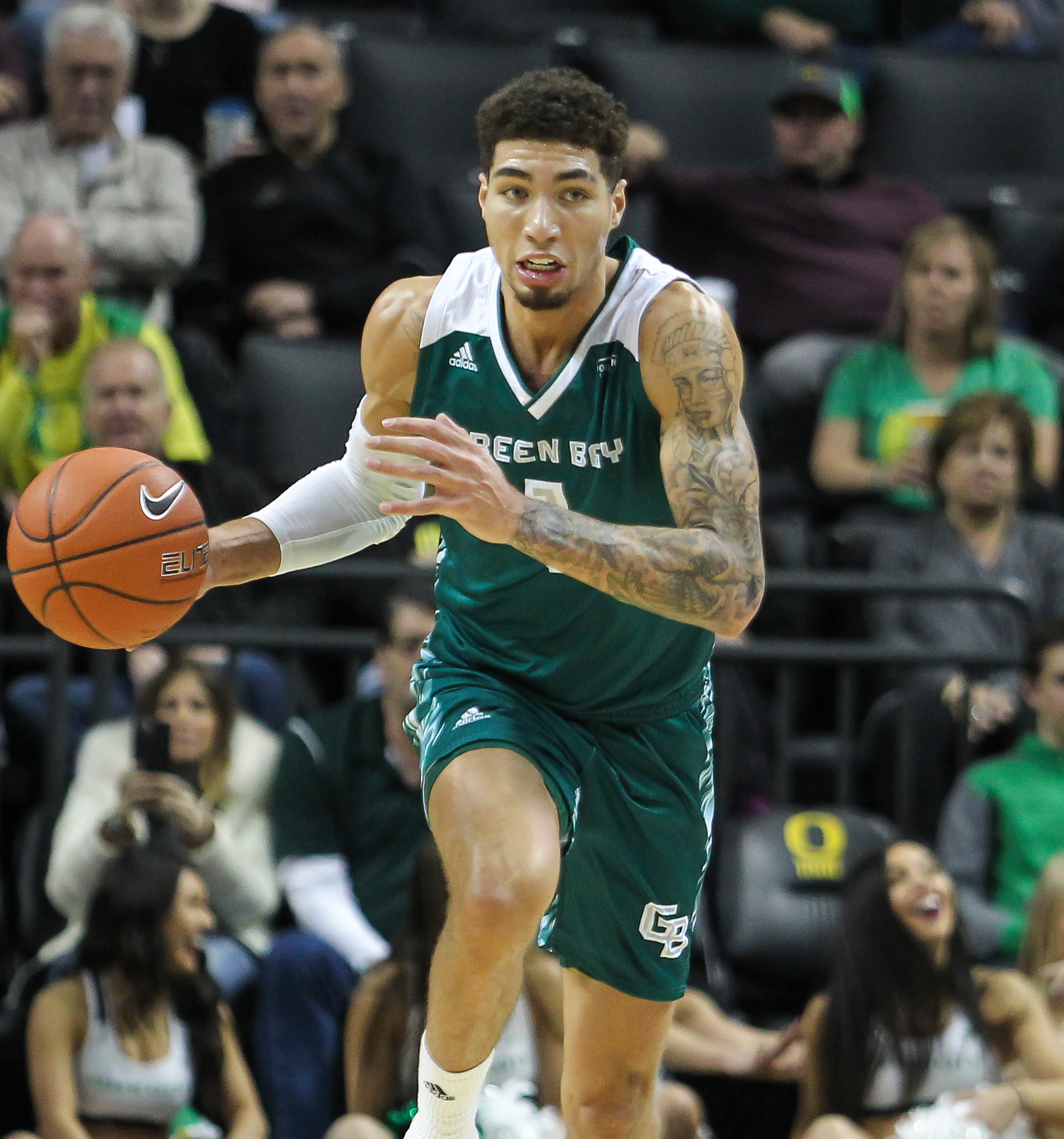
Sandy Cohen, playing basketball for Green Bay.

UW–Green Bay, which brands itself athletically as "Green Bay", is an NCAA Division I school and a member of the Horizon League.

The Green Bay women's basketball team has won or tied for the Horizon League regular-season championship twenty times. The team has been to the NCAA tournament twenty times. It has also made two appearances in the Women's National Invitation Tournament (WNIT).

The team received its first national ranking in 2003, when it was ranked as high as #16 in both the Associated Press poll and the Coaches' Poll. In 2005, it also received a national ranking and a bid to the NCAA Tournament, but was knocked out in the first round by Maryland. In 2006, it appeared in the WNIT, where it lost to Iowa State in a first-round game. The next season, it was seeded #9 in the NCAA Tournament, where it defeated New Mexico in the first round before falling to top-seeded Connecticut in the second round. That loss ended their school record and nation-leading 26-game winning streak.

The next NCAA Tournament win for the Phoenix women came in 2010, when they entered as a #12 seed and upset 5-seed Virginia in the first round before bowing out to Iowa State on the Cyclones' home court just short of the Sweet 16. In the 2011 tournament, they entered as a #5 seed and made their first Sweet Sixteen appearance, defeating Arkansas–Little Rock and Michigan State before losing to regional top seed Baylor.

The Green Bay softball team claimed its first Horizon League tournament championship in 2005. It went on to the national tournament, where it defeated #5 seed Oregon State in the first round.

The Green Bay Women's Volleyball team claimed its first regular season Horizon League title and the first Horizon League tournament championship in 2018. The team went on to the NCAA DI tournament, losing to the #4 seed University of Wisconsin–Madison in the first round.

== Notable alumni ==
=== Sports ===
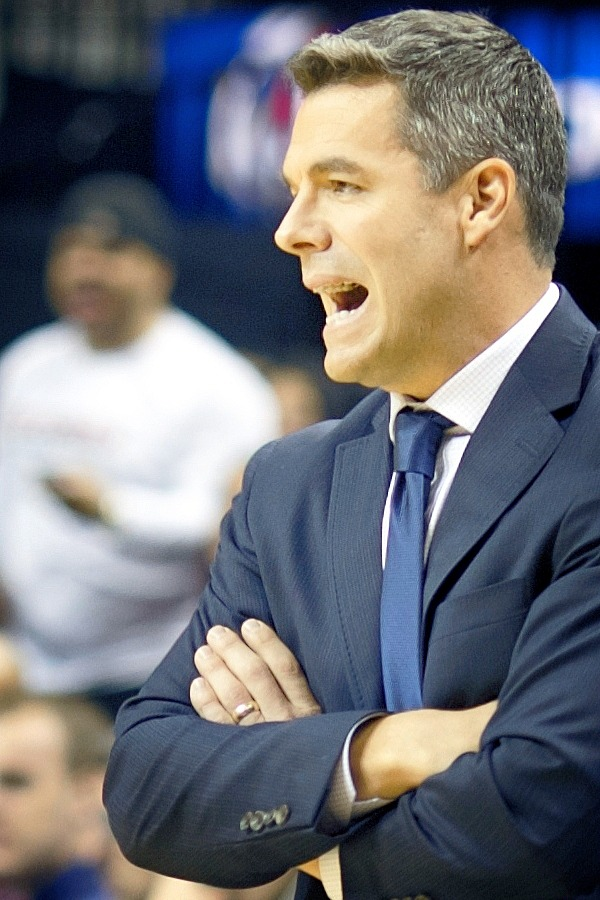
Tony Bennett

- Kathi Bennett, basketball coach
- Tony Bennett, basketball player and coach
- Alec Brown, basketball player
- Sandy Cohen, American-Israeli basketball player in the Israeli Basketball Premier League
- Daeshon Francis (born 1996), basketball player in the Israeli Basketball Premier League
- Mehryn Kraker, basketball player and coach
- Allie LeClaire, basketball player and coach
- Jessica Lindstrom, basketball player
- Alfonzo McKinnie, basketball player
- Jeff Nordgaard, American-Polish basketball player
- Rob Davis, Dallas Cowboys assistant coach
- Tosaint Ricketts, Canadian soccer player
- Michael Schachtner, basketball player
- Horst Stemke, Olympic soccer player
- Keifer Sykes, basketball player in the G League
- Logan Vander Velden, basketball player
- Julie Wojta, basketball player

=== Politics and education ===
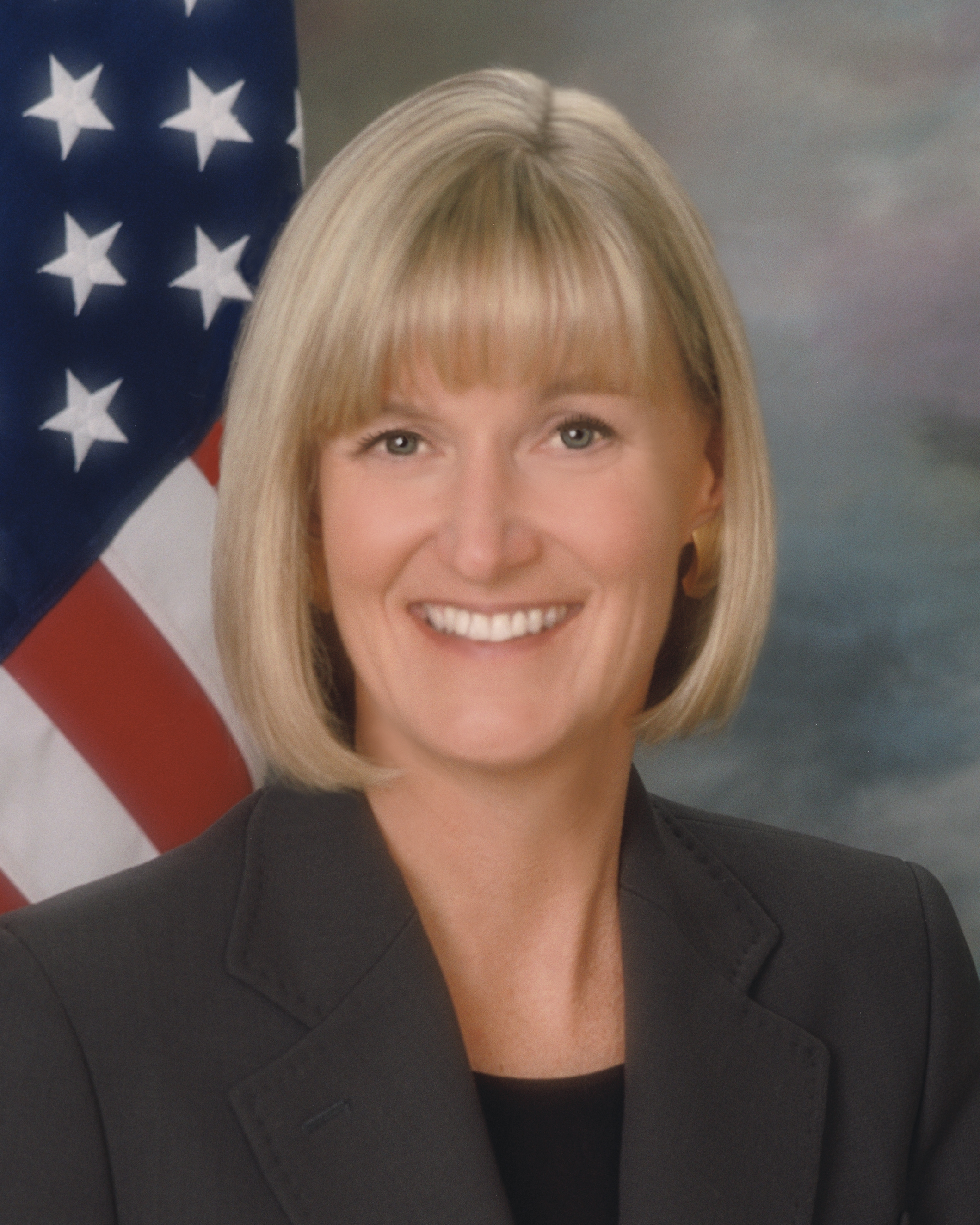
Barbara Lawton

- James R. Charneski, Wisconsin State Representative
- Robert Cowles, Wisconsin State Senator
- Dave Hansen, Wisconsin State Senator
- Frank Lasee, Wisconsin State Senator
- Barbara Lawton, Lieutenant Governor of Wisconsin (attended)
- Sharon Metz, Wisconsin State Representative
- Kathleen E. Christensen, social scientist
- Romaine Quinn, Wisconsin State Senator
- Tyler Vorpagel, Wisconsin State Representative
- Ty Bodden, Wisconsin State Representative
- Nathan Petrashek, Wisconsin Court of Appeals Judge

=== Entertainment ===
- Mike Grell, comic book writer and artist
- Tony Shalhoub, actor (did not graduate)
- Kevin MacLeod, composer and music producer (did not graduate)

=== Business ===
- Mike Jackson, former Supervalu executive
- Jill Lajdziak, former general manager, Saturn
- Mark King, CEO of Taco Bell and former president & CEO of TaylorMade.

== Notable faculty ==
- Gregory S. Aldrete, Emeritus Professor of History and Humanistic Studies.
- Herbert J. Grover, Wisconsin educator and politician, served as a professor in the 1990s.
- Harvey J. Kaye, Emeritus Professor of Democracy and Justice Studies.
- Michael Monfils, Mayor of Green Bay, served as adjunct Government faculty after leaving mayoral office in 1979.
- Denise Sweet, Poet Laureate of Wisconsin (2004–2008); Associate Professor of First Nations Studies, at the university until 2011.
