= False indigo =

False indigo is a common name for several plants related to indigo; it may refer to:

- Amorpha, particularly
  - Amorpha fruticosa, native to North America
- Baptisia

== See also ==
- Indigo bush
