= Women's Super League (basketball) =

Irish basketball league

- Current season, competition or edition: 2024–25 Women's Super League (basketball)
- Sport: Basketball
- Founded: 1978
- First season: 1978–79
- No. of teams: 10
- Countries: Republic of Ireland
- Continent: Europe
- Most recent champion: Ambassador UCC Glanmire (7th title)
- Most titles: Ambassador UCC Glanmire (7 titles)
- Broadcaster: TG4
- Sponsor: Hula Hoops
- Relegation to: Women's Division 1
- Website: Basketball Ireland

The Women's Super League (formerly known as the Women's Premier League) is the top tier women's basketball league in Ireland. The league has 10 teams, all in the Republic of Ireland, and is an active member of Basketball Ireland, which is recognized by FIBA (also known as the International Basketball Federation) as the national governing body for basketball in Ireland.

== History ==
The league was founded in 1978.

== Teams ==
Locations of Women's Super League teams in Ireland
Locations of Women's Super League teams in Greater Dublin

Team	Arena	City/Area
Ambassador UCC Glanmire	Mardyke Arena; Little Island Sports Complex; Upper Glanmire Sports Centre	Glanmire / Mardyke, Cork
Courtyard Liffey Celtics	Leixlip Amenities Centre	Leixlip
DCU Mercy	DCU Sports Complex; Loreto College, St Stephens Green	Glasnevin / Coolock, Dublin
Fr. Mathews	Fr. Mathews Arena	Bishopstown, Cork
IT Carlow Basketball	Barrow Centre, IT Carlow; Old Leighlin Community Hall	Carlow
Marble City Hawks	O'Loughlin Gaels GAA	Kilkenny
Maxol WIT Wildcats	Mercy Gym	Waterford
NUIG Mystics	Kingfisher Gym; Ballinfoile Castlegar Neighbourhood Centre	Galway
Pyrobel Killester	IWA, Clontarf	Killester / Clontarf, Dublin
Singleton SuperValu Brunell	Gurranabraher Parochial Hall	Gurranabraher, Cork

== Roll of Honour ==
Season	League winner	Second tournament winner (Note: until 2018 called the "National Cup." In 2018–19 the "Champions Trophy." Since then the "Post season play-off.")
1978–79	Killester	Not yet established
1979–80	Killester	Not yet established
1980–81	Corinthians	Not yet established
1981–82	Naomh Mhuire	Not yet established
1982–83	Meteors	Not yet established
1983–84	Meteors	Naomh Mhuire
1984–85	Meteors	Meteors
1985–86	Meteors	Tralee
1986–87	Tralee	Blarney
1987–88	Tralee	Castledermot
1988–89	Blarney	Naomh Mhuire
1989–90	Blarney	Tralee
1990–91	Blarney	Ballina
1991–92	Naomh Mhuire	Meteors
1992–93	Meteors	Tralee
1993–94		Naomh Mhuire
1994–95		Naomh Mhuire
1995–96	Meteors	Meteors
1996–97	Naomh Mhuire	Naomh Mhuire
1997–98	Wildcats	Wildcats
1998–99	Wildcats	Tolka Rovers
1999–2000		Wildcats
2000–01		Wildcats
2001–02	Tolka Rovers	Killester
2002–03		UL
2003–04		UL
2004–05	UL	
2005–06		UL
2006–07		Glanmire
2007–08		Glanmire
2008–09		Glanmire
2009–10		DCU Mercy
2010–11		DCU Mercy
2011–12		UL Huskies
2012–13		UL Huskies
2013–14	Glanmire	Glanmire
2014–15	Glanmire	Glanmire
2015–16	Glanmire	Glanmire
2016–17	Liffey Celtics	Glanmire
2017–18	Glanmire	DCU Mercy
2018–19	Liffey Celtics	Fr Mathews
2019–20	DCU Mercy	Not played due to COVID-19
2020–21	Cancelled due to COVID-19 pandemic	
2021–22	The Address UCC Glanmire	The Address UCC Glanmire

== See also ==
- Super League, the men's competition
- Basketball Ireland
- Ireland Women's National Basketball Team
