= Julie Wojta =

American basketball player (born 1989)

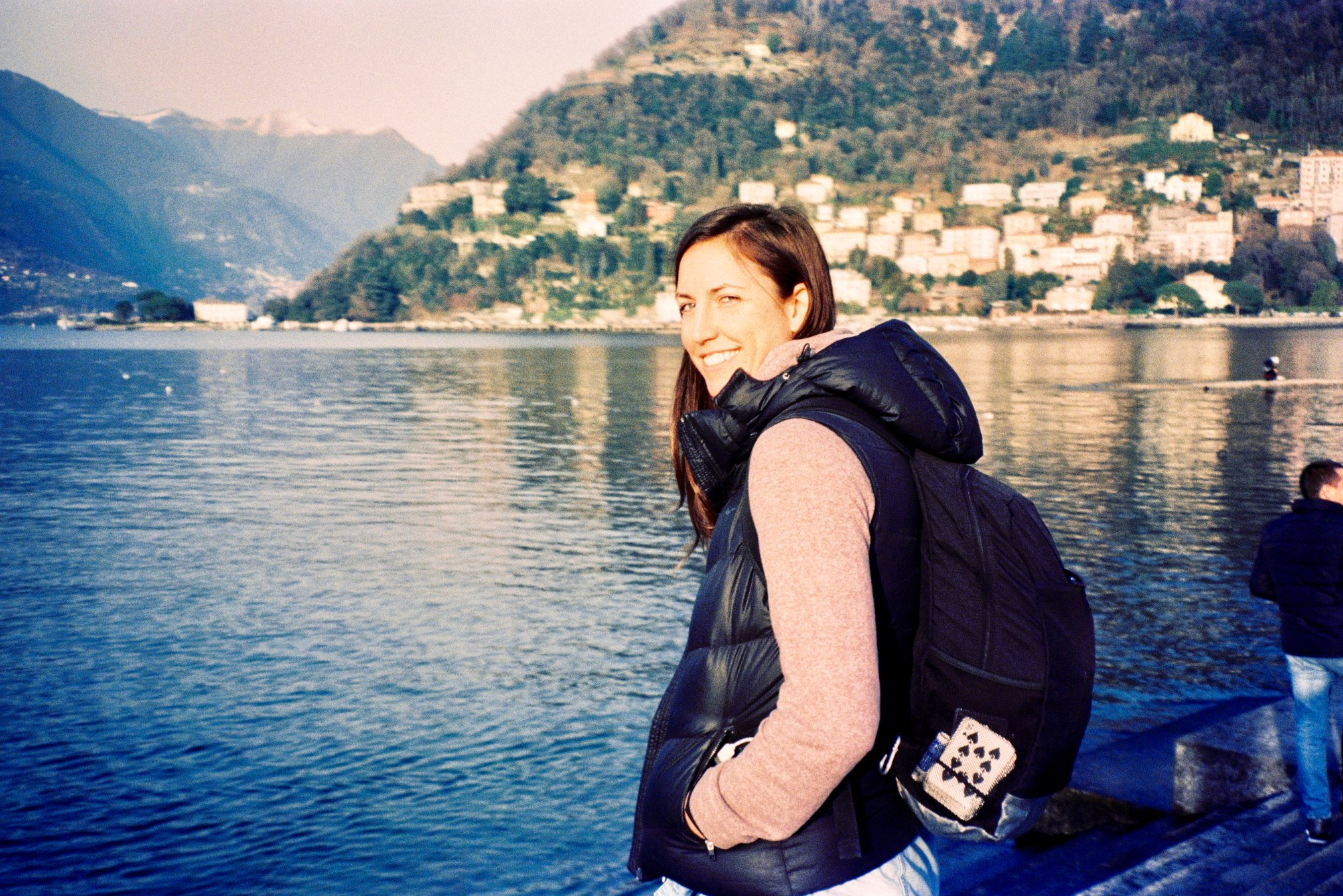

No. 2 – Basket Landes
- Position: Shooting guard / small forward
- League: Ligue Féminine de Basketball

Personal information
- Born: April 9, 1989 (age 37) Francis Creek, Wisconsin, U.S.
- Listed height: 6 ft 0 in (1.83 m)
- Listed weight: 175 lb (79 kg)

Career information
- High school: Mishicot (Mishicot, Wisconsin)
- College: Green Bay (2008–2012)
- WNBA draft: 2012: 2nd round, 18th overall pick
- Drafted by: Minnesota Lynx

Career history
- 2012-2012: Minnesota Lynx
- 2013-2013: San Antonio Silver Stars
- 2012-2014: BC Namur-Capitale
- 2014-2017: Basket Femminile Le Mura Lucca
- 2017-2019: Pallacanestro Broni 93
- 2019: Wisconsin GLO
- 2019-2020: Gernika KESB
- 2020-2021: Magnolia Basket Campobasso
- 2021-2022: Tarbes Gespe Bigorre
- 2022-2023: Gernika KESB
- 2023-2024: Angers 49
- 2024-2025: ASVEL Féminin
- 2025-present: Basket Landes

Career highlights
- Liga Femenina de Baloncesto Most Valuable Forward Player of the Year (2020); Most Valuable Player (Maurizio Ferrara Prize, 2021); Second-team All-American – AP (2012); Horizon League Player of the Year (2012); Horizon League Defensive Player of the Year (2012); First-team All-Horizon (2012)
- Stats at WNBA.com
- Stats at Basketball Reference

Julie Nicole Wojta (born April 9, 1989) is an American basketball player for Basket Landes of the Liga Femenina (LFB). Wojta played college basketball at the University of Wisconsin–Green Bay, where she was a Wade Trophy and Wooden Award finalist, Horizon League tournament MVP, and a second-team All-America pick. Wojta was the first Green Bay resident to be selected in a WNBA draught and to be included on an Associated Press All-American team.

== Early life and career ==
=== High school ===
Wojta hailed from Francis Creek, Wisconsin, and attended Mishicot High School, where she was a three-year starter on the basketball team. Wojta was a lauded player at Mishicot, receiving two years of all-county honors, two Manitowoc Herald Times Reporter Player of the Year awards, and two Olympian Conference Player of the Year awards. Wojta was also an Associated Press honorable mention selection for Wisconsin's all-state team after her junior year after leading Mishicot to a conference title. Wojta also participated in track and field as a high school athlete.

=== College ===
Wojta redshirted for her true freshman season, and led the team's redshirt freshmen the next year in total rebounds and free throw percentage. As a sophomore, she was a Second Team All-Horizon League selection, in addition to being a Horizon League Player of the Week. Wojta began her junior season as a preseason First Team All-Conference Selection, she would go on to finish the season as a Second Team All-Horizon League and All-Tournament selection.

In her final season, Wojta received many accolades. She was a preseason First Team All-Horizon League selection and would be named Horizon League Player of the Week four times. She finished the season named to the Horizon League's All-Defensive and First All-League Teams, and was the Horizon League's Player of the Year and Defensive Player of the Year, later capturing the Horizon League Tournament MVP Award. Wojta led the Horizon League in scoring and steals, and was a finalist for the John R. Wooden Award and Wade Trophy, but won neither. Wojta was later named an AP Second Team All-American, the first Green Bay women's basketball player to do so since the school became Division 1. She holds program records for most steals in a season (127) and most career double-doubles.

=== Professional ===
Wojta was drafted by the Minnesota Lynx, becoming the first Green Bay player drafted by a WNBA team. However, she was cut after the 2012 training camp, proceeding to sign a contract to play with Dexia Namur in Belgium. In July, Wojta was brought back to the Lynx on a short-term contract to provide depth after a series of injuries.

Wotja made her WNBA regular-season debut on July 12, 2012, grabbing two rebounds in limited play. She was waived by the team in August, once the injured players returned to the team.

In 2013, Wojta was invited to training camp with the San Antonio Silver Stars, but was cut prior to the season. She was re-signed on June 5, 2013, to provide depth due to injuries. She made her debut with the Silver Stars on June 7, playing briefly in a win over the Chicago Sky.

== WNBA career statistics ==
Legend
GP	Games played	GS	Games started	MPG	Minutes per game	RPG	Rebounds per game
APG	Assists per game	SPG	Steals per game	BPG	Blocks per game	PPG	Points per game
TO	Turnovers per game	FG%	Field-goal percentage	3P%	3-point field-goal percentage	FT%	Free-throw percentage
**Bold**	Career best	°	League leader

=== Regular season ===
Year	Team	GP	GS	MPG	FG%	3P%	FT%	RPG	APG	SPG	BPG	TO	PPG
2012	Minnesota	1	0	4.0	.000	.000	.000	**2.0**	0.0	0.0	0.0	1.0	0.0
2013	San Antonio	**3**	0	**8.3**	**1.000**	.000	**.667**	**2.0**	**0.3**	**1.0**	0.0	1.0	**2.0**
Career	2 years, 2 teams	4	0	7.3	.500	.000	.667	2.0	0.3	0.8	0.0	1.0	1.5

== Green Bay statistics ==
Legend
GP	Games played	GS	Games started	MPG	Minutes per game
FG%	Field goal percentage	3P%	3-point field goal percentage	FT%	Free throw percentage
RPG	Rebounds per game	APG	Assists per game	SPG	Steals per game
BPG	Blocks per game	PPG	Points per game	**Bold**	Career high

Year	Team	GP	Points	FG%	3P%	FT%	RPG	APG	SPG	BPG	PPG
2007-08	Green Bay	-	-	-	-	-	-	-	-	-	-
2008-09	Green Bay	22	42	38.5	25.0	64.3	2.1	0.7	0.6	0.1	1.9
2009-10	Green Bay	33	463	**51.4**	**50.0**	**82.9**	6.2	3.5	2.0	0.3	14.0
2010-11	Green Bay	**36**	489	47.7	31.4	79.0	7.4	**3.6**	2.3	0.5	13.6
2011-12	Green Bay	33	**644**	51.3	40.8	79.9	**9.9**	3.5	**3.8**	**0.8**	**19.5**
Career Totals	Green Bay	124	1638	49.8	38.6	79.9	6.8	3.0	2.3	0.5	13.2

== Accolades and awards ==
=== College ===
- Horizon League Player of the Year (2012)
- Horizon League Defensive Player of the Year (2012)
- Associated Press Second Team All-American (2012)
- Horizon League Tournament MVP (2012)
- Horizon League All-Tournament Team (2011)
- Horizon League All-Defensive Team (2012)
- First Team All-Horizon League (2012)
- Second Team All-Horizon League (2010, 2011)
- Preseason First Team All-Horizon League (2010, 2011)
- Program record holder for single season steals (127)
- Program Division 1 record holder for career double-doubles (35)

=== High school ===
- 2 X Wisconsin All-county Honours
- 2 X Olympian Conference Player of the Year
- 2 X Manitowoc Herald Times Reporter — Player of the Year
- Associated Press Honourable Mention Wisconsin's All-state team (2006)
- Olympian Conference Title as a junior, with an average 17.6 points and 13.0 rebounds a game
- All-conference Honourable Mention as a freshman, with an average 12.8 points and 8.3 rebounds a game

=== Europe ===
- Lega Basket Femminile Eurobasket.com All-Italian A1 Defensive Player of the Year (2018)
- Liga Femenina de Baloncesto Most Valuable Forward Player of the Year (2020)
- Most Valuable Player (Maurizio Ferrara Prize, 2021)
