= 2018 Horizon League women's basketball tournament =

- Classification: Division I
- Season: 2017–18
- Teams: 10
- Site: Little Caesars Arena; Detroit, Michigan
- Champions: Green Bay (16th title)
- Winning coach: Kevin Borseth (12th title)
- MVP: Allie LeClaire (Green Bay)

2017–18 Horizon League women's basketball standings
	Conf.				Overall
Team	W		L	PCT	W		L	PCT
No. 21 Green Bay †	16	–	2	.889	29	–	4	.879
IUPUI	13	–	5	.722	22	–	10	.688
Wright State	12	–	6	.667	23	–	11	.676
Milwaukee	11	–	7	.611	21	–	12	.636
Cleveland State	11	–	7	.611	19	–	11	.633
Youngstown State	11	–	7	.611	16	–	16	.500
Oakland	7	–	11	.389	15	–	16	.484
Northern Kentucky	6	–	12	.333	9	–	22	.290
Detroit	2	–	16	.111	2	–	28	.067
UIC	1	–	17	.056	8	–	22	.267
† 2018 Horizon League Tournament winner As of 18 March 2018; Rankings from AP poll

The 2018 Horizon League women's basketball tournament (also known as Motor City Madness) was the conference tournament that ended the 2017–18 season of the Horizon League. It was being played from March 2 through March 6, 2018, at Little Caesars Arena in Detroit. Regular-season champion Green Bay won the tournament and earned the Horizon League's automatic berth into the 2018 NCAA women's tournament.

== Seeds ==
All 10 teams are participating in the tournament. The top six teams received a bye into the Second round. This was a change from the previous season where the top two seeds received double byes into the Semifinals. Teams were seeded by record within the conference, with a tiebreaker system to seed teams with identical conference records.

Seed	School	Conference record	Overall record	Tiebreaker 1	Tiebreaker 2
1	Green Bay	16–2	26–3		
2	IUPUI	13–5	21–8		
3	Wright State	12–6	21–9		
4	Milwaukee	11–7	20–10	3–1 vs. YSU, CSU	1–1 vs. WSU
5	Youngstown State	11–7	15–14	3–1 vs. MKE, CSU	0–2 vs. WSU
6	Cleveland State	11–7	19–10	1–3 vs. MKE, YSU	
7	Oakland	7–11	14–15		
8	Northern Kentucky	6–12	8–21		
9	Detroit Mercy	2–16	2–27		
10	UIC	1–17	8–21		

== Schedule ==
Game	Time	Matchup	Final score	Television
First round – Friday, March 2
1	Noon	No.10 UIC vs. No.7 Oakland	46 - 80	ESPN3
2	2:30 PM	No.9 Detroit Mercy vs. No.8 Northern Kentucky	61 - 76	ESPN3
Second round – Saturday, March 3
3	12:00 PM	No.7 Oakland vs. No.2 IUPUI	59 - 72	ESPN3
4	2:30 PM	No.8 Northern Kentucky vs. No.1 Green Bay	49 - 62	ESPN3
Second round – Sunday, March 4
5	Noon	No.6 Cleveland State vs. No.3 Wright State	83 - 61	ESPN3
6	2:30 PM	No.5 Youngstown State vs. No.4 Milwaukee	62 - 58	ESPN3
Semifinals – Monday, March 5
7	1:00 PM	No.5 Youngstown State vs. No. 1 Green Bay	45 - 66	ESPN3
8	3:30 PM	No.3 Wright State vs. No.2 IUPUI	60 - 52	ESPN3
Finals – Tuesday, March 6
9	Noon	No.3 Wright State vs. No.1 Green Bay	44 - 62	ESPNU
All game times in Eastern Time Zone.

== Bracket ==
First round Friday, March 2
8	Northern Kentucky	76
9	Detroit Mercy	61
7	Oakland	80
10	UIC	46

Second round Saturday/Sunday, March 3/4
1	Green Bay	62
8	Northern Kentucky	49
4	Milwaukee	58
5	Youngstown State	62
3	Wright State	83
6	Cleveland State	61
2	IUPUI	72
7	Oakland	59

Semifinals; Monday, March 5
1	Green Bay	66
5	Youngstown State	45
3	Wright State	60
2	IUPUI	52

Finals; Tuesday, March 6
1	Green Bay	62
3	Wright State	44
