= Global Women's Basketball Association =

American basketball league (2016–2024)

- Sport: Basketball
- Founded: 2016
- Founder: Sonya Nichols
- First season: 2016
- Folded: 2024
- No. of teams: 4
- Country: United States
- Last champion: Wisconsin Glo (3rd)
- Most titles: Flint Monarchs (4)
- Website: gwba.us

The Global Women's Basketball Association (GWBA) was a semi-professional women's professional basketball league operating in the Midwest region of the United States. The league was founded in 2016, and played until 2023. GWBA rosters were composed primarily of former collegiate players, often playing for the team nearest their former school, and former WNBA players.

== History ==
The league was established in 2016 by Sonya Nichols, a former basketball player for the James Madison Dukes. The inaugural season began with four teams: the Flint Monarchs, Milwaukee Aces, Akron Innovators, and Illinois Starletz. The Monarchs finished the season undefeated and won the league championship. The 2017 season saw teams play eight games instead of seven; the Monarchs again won the championship. Following the 2018 season, which was again won by the Monarchs, the league added two teams: the Wisconsin Glo and St. Louis Surge. The Glo finished their inaugural season undefeated and won the league championship, defeating the three-time defending champions Monarchs. The 2020 season was canceled due to the COVID-19 pandemic. In 2021, the Music City Icons were replaced by the Detroit Dodgers, who finished out the regular season schedule but ultimately left the GWBA to become an independent women's basketball organization. The Surge finished the regular season in first place but were upset by the Glo in the championship.

=== Folding ===
Despite announcing the upcoming season schedule in June 2024, the season was abruptly canceled without any further word from the league, which did not respond to requests for comment from local news organizations. Other stations connected the cancellation to the documented financial problems affecting the championship venue, the Oshkosh Arena. At least one franchise went on to play in another independent semi-professional league.

== Teams ==
=== Current ===
| Team | City | Arena | Capacity | Joined |
|---|---|---|---|---|
| Flint Monarchs | Flint, Michigan | Dort Federal Credit Union Event Center | 4,421 | 2016 |
| KCrossover | Independence, Missouri | Kansas City Elite Basketball Academy | – | 2019 |
| St. Louis Surge | Clayton, Missouri | Mabee Gymnasium | 3,800 | 2019 |
| Wisconsin Glo | Oshkosh, Wisconsin | Oshkosh Arena | 3,500 | 2019 |

=== Former ===
| Team | City | Arena | Joined | Left |
|---|---|---|---|---|
| Detroit Queens | Detroit, Michigan | Curtis L. Ivery Center | 2022 | 2023 |
| Indianapolis Bandits | Fort Wayne, Indiana | Spiece Fieldhouse | 2018 | 2019 |
| Milwaukee Aces | Milwaukee, Wisconsin | Reiman Gymnasium | 2016 | 2019 |
| Illinois Starletz | Chicago, Illinois | | | |
| Detroit Dodgers | Detroit, Michigan | | | |
| Chicago Breeze | Chicago, Illinois | | | |
| Akron Innovators | Akron, Ohio | | | |

== Champions ==
| Game | Date | Winning team | | Losing team | | Site | Notes |
|---|---|---|---|---|---|---|---|
| 2016 | August 20, 2016 | Flint Monarchs | 99 | Akron Innovators | 52 | Ballenger Fieldhouse | |
| 2017 | August 19, 2017 | Flint Monarchs | 83 | Milwaukee Aces | 68 | Reiman Gymnasium | |
| 2018 | August 25, 2018 | Flint Monarchs | 107 | Indianapolis Bandits | 69 | Dort Federal Credit Union Event Center | |
| 2019 | August 11, 2019 | Wisconsin Glo | 80 | Flint Monarchs | 78 | Menominee Nation Arena | |
| 2020 | Season cancelled due to the COVID-19 pandemic | | | | | | |
| 2021 | August 15, 2021 | Wisconsin Glo | 93 | St. Louis Surge | 77 | Mabee Gymnasium | |
| 2022 | August 7, 2022 | Flint Monarchs | 72 | Wisconsin Glo | 70 | Oshkosh Arena | |
| 2023 | August 6, 2023 | Wisconsin Glo | 104 | Flint Monarchs | 97 | Oshkosh Arena | First overtime championship. |
