= Green Bay Phoenix women's basketball =

2026–27 Green Bay Phoenix women's basketball team
- University: University of Wisconsin–Green Bay
- Head coach: Kayla Karius (3rd season)
- Location: Green Bay, Wisconsin
- Arena: Kress Events Center (capacity: 4,018)
- Conference: Horizon League
- Nickname: Phoenix
- Colors: Green and white

NCAA Division I tournament Sweet Sixteen
- 2011

NCAA Division I tournament appearances
- 1994, 1998, 1999, 2000, 2002, 2003, 2004, 2005, 2007, 2009, 2010, 2011, 2012, 2013, 2015, 2016, 2017, 2018, 2024, 2025, 2026

Conference tournament champions
- Mid-Continent; 1994 Horizon; 1998, 1999, 2000, 2002, 2003, 2004, 2005, 2007, 2009, 2011, 2012, 2013, 2015, 2016, 2017, 2018, 2024, 2025, 2026

Conference regular-season champions
- North Star; 1991, 1992' Horizon; 1996, 1999, 2000, 2001, 2002, 2003, 2004, 2005, 2006, 2007, 2008, 2009, 2010, 2011, 2012, 2013, 2014, 2015, 2016, 2017, 2018, 2023, 2025, 2026

The Green Bay Phoenix women's basketball team is an NCAA Division I college women's basketball team competing in the Horizon League for the University of Wisconsin–Green Bay. The head coach is Kayla Karius. The Green Bay Phoenix entered the current season on a string of 46 consecutive winning seasons, with only Tennessee having a longer such streak in women's college basketball.

In 2017–18, Green Bay captured its 20th straight regular season title and 16th league tournament title. The program made its 18th appearance in the NCAA Tournament, finishing the season 29–4, winning 27 games or more for the fourth consecutive year.

== Year by Year Results ==
Record table
Season	Team	Overall	Conference	Standing	Postseason
Carol Hammerle (1973–1997)
1973–74	Carol Hammerle	3–9	–		
1974–75	Carol Hammerle	8–9	–		
1975–76	Carol Hammerle	7–12	–		
1976–77	Carol Hammerle	4–17	–		
1977–78	Carol Hammerle	14–9	–		
1978–79	Carol Hammerle	17–7	–		
AIAW Division II/Independent
1979–80	Carol Hammerle	18–9	–		MAIAW Regionals
1980–81	Carol Hammerle	24–5	–		MAIAW Regionals
Wisconsin Women's Intercollegiate Athletic Conference
1981–82	Carol Hammerle	27–8	10–0	1st	AIAW DII Quarterfinals
NAIA/WWIAC
1982–83	Carol Hammerle	23–9	5–1	1st	NAIA District
1983–84	Carol Hammerle	24–6	7–3	2nd	NAIA District
Independent
1984–85	Carol Hammerle	24–10	–		NAIA District
1985–86	Carol Hammerle	21–9	–		NAIA Nationals
1986–87	Carol Hammerle	24–6	–		NAIA Final Four
NCAA Division I/Independent
1987–88	Carol Hammerle	22–6	–		
North Star Conference
1988–89	Carol Hammerle	19–10	11–3	3rd	
1989–90	Carol Hammerle	16–13	7–5	3rd	
1990–91	Carol Hammerle	22–6	13–1	1st	
1991–92	Carol Hammerle	24–7	12–0	1st	WNIT First Round
Mid-Continent Conference
1992–93	Carol Hammerle	19–10	14–2	2nd	
1993–94	Carol Hammerle	18–11	13–5	2nd	NCAA First Round
Midwest Collegiate Conference/Horizon League
1994–95	Carol Hammerle	19–9	10–6	T–4th	
1995–96	Carol Hammerle	20–9	14–2	1st	
1996–97	Carol Hammerle	18–11	11–5	3rd	
1997–98	Carol Hammerle	21–9	11–3	2nd	NCAA First Round
Carol Hammerle:		456-226	138-36		
Kevin Borseth (Midwest Collegiate Conference/Horizon League) (1998–2007)
1998–99	Kevin Borseth	19–10	13–1	1st	NCAA First Round
1999–00	Kevin Borseth	21–9	12–2	1st	NCAA First Round
2000–01	Kevin Borseth	22–9	12–2	T–1st	WNIT First Round
2001–02	Kevin Borseth	24–7	15–1	1st	NCAA First Round
2002–03	Kevin Borseth	28–4	15–1	1st	NCAA Second Round
2003–04	Kevin Borseth	23–8	13–3	1st	NCAA First Round
2004–05	Kevin Borseth	27–4	15–1	1st	NCAA First Round
2005–06	Kevin Borseth	23–7	14–2	T–1st	WNIT First Round
2006–07	Kevin Borseth	29–4	16–0	1st	NCAA Second Round
Kevin Borseth (1st stint):		216–62	125–13		
Matt Bollant (Horizon League) (2007–2012)
2007–08	Matt Bollant	26–6	17–1	1st	WNIT First Round
2008–09	Matt Bollant	29–4	18–0	1st	NCAA First Round
2009–10	Matt Bollant	28–5	15–3	1st	NCAA Second Round
2010–11	Matt Bollant	34–2	18–0	1st	NCAA Sweet Sixteen
2011–12	Matt Bollant	31–2	17–1	1st	NCAA Second Round
Matt Bollant:		148–19	85–5		
Kevin Borseth (Horizon League) (2012–2024)
2012–13	Kevin Borseth	29–3	16–0	1st	NCAA First Round
2013–14	Kevin Borseth	22–10	13–3	1st	WNIT First Round
2014–15	Kevin Borseth	28–5	15–1	1st	NCAA First Round
2015–16	Kevin Borseth	28–5	16–2	1st	NCAA First Round
2016–17	Kevin Borseth	27–6	15–3	1st	NCAA First Round
2017–18	Kevin Borseth	29–4	16–2	1st	NCAA First Round
2018–19	Kevin Borseth	22–10	15–3	2nd	WNIT First Round
2019–20	Kevin Borseth	19–13	13–5	T-2nd	
2020–21	Kevin Borseth	15–7	14–4	3rd	
2021–22	Kevin Borseth	20–8	15–4	3rd	WNIT First Round
2022–23	Kevin Borseth	28–6	18–2	1st	WNIT Second Round
2023–24	Kevin Borseth	27–7	17–3	2nd	NCAA First Round
Kevin Borseth (2nd stint):		293–84 (.777)	182–32 (.850)		
Kevin Borseth (Total):		509–146 (.777)	307–45 (.872)		
Kayla Karius (Horizon League) (2024–present)
2024–25	Kayla Karius	29–6	19–1	1st	NCAA First Round
2025–26	Kayla Karius	25–9	17–3	1st	NCAA First Round
Kayla Karius (Total):		54–15 (.783)	36–4 (.900)		
Total:		1,148–398 (.743)			
National champion Postseason invitational champion Conference regular season champion Conference regular season and conference tournament champion Division regular season champion Division regular season and conference tournament champion Conference tournament champion

== Postseason ==
=== NCAA Division I ===
The Phoenix have appeared in 21 tournaments, with a record of 6–21.

Year	Seed	Round	Opponent	Result
1994	#15	First Round	#2 Stanford	L 56–81
1998	#14	First Round	#3 Illinois	L 58–82
1999	#14	First Round	#3 UCLA	L 69–76
2000	#13	First Round	#4 Old Dominion	L 85–94
2002	#13	First Round	#4 Texas	L 55–60
2003	#8	First Round; Second Round	#9 Washington #1 LSU	W 78–65; L 69–80
2004	#14	First Round	#3 Houston	L 47–62
2005	#10	First Round	#7 Maryland	L 55–65
2007	#9	First Round; Second Round	#8 New Mexico #1 Connecticut	W 59–52; L 70–94
2009	#11	First Round	#6 LSU	L 59–69
2010	#12	First Round; Second Round	#5 Virginia #4 Iowa State	W 69–67; L 56–60
2011	#5	First Round; Second Round; Sweet Sixteen	#12 Little Rock #4 Michigan State #1 Baylor	W 59–55; W 65–56; L 76–86
2012	#7	First Round; Second Round	#10 Iowa State #2 Kentucky	W 71–57; L 62–65
2013	#11	First Round	#6 LSU	L 71–75
2015	#9	First Round	#8 Princeton	L 70–80
2016	#10	First Round	#7 Tennessee	L 53–59
2017	#8	First Round	#9 Purdue	L 62–74
2018	#7	First Round	#10 Minnesota	L 77–89
2024	#11	First Round	#6 Tennessee	L 92–63
2025	#12	First Round	#5 Alabama	L 67–81
2026	#13	First Round	#4 Minnesota	L 58–75

=== NAIA Division I ===
The Phoenix made the NAIA Division I women's basketball tournament two times, with a combined record of 3–2.

Year	Seed	Round	Opponent	Result
1986	NR	First Round	#4 Oklahoma Christian	L 48–78
1987	#8	First Round; Quarterfinals; Semifinals; Third place game	NR Auburn Montgomery #1 Wayland Baptist #4 North Georgia #6 Arkansas Tech	W 87–61; W 74–73; L 76–85; W 82–65

== National awards ==
=== Mid-Major Player of the Year ===
- Mehryn Kraker (2017)

=== All-American Second Team ===
- Julie Wojta (2012)

=== Academic All-American ===
- Pam Roecker (1983)
- Chari Nordgaard (1999)

=== John R. Wooden All-American ===
- Julie Wojta (2012)

=== Wade Award Finalist ===
- Julie Wojta (2012)

== Horizon League awards ==
=== Cecil N. Coleman Medal of Honor ===
- Chari Nordgaard (1999)
- Kristy Loiselle (2003)
- Kayla Tetschlag (2011)
- Julie Wojta (2012)
- Ellen Edison (2015)
- Mehryn Kraker (2017)

=== Player of the Year ===
- Chari Nordgaard (1999)
- Mandy Stowe (2001)
- Kristy Loiselle (2003)
- Tiffany Mor (2005)
- Nicole Soulis (2006, 2007)
- Kayla Tetschlag (2011)
- Celeste Hoewisch (2011)
- Julie Wojta (2012)
- Mehryn Kraker (2017)
- Jenna Guyer (2026)

=== Defensive Player of the Year ===
- Celeste Hoewisch (2011)
- Julie Wojta (2012)
- Kaili Lukan (2016)
- Jen Wellnitz (2018, 2019)
- Bailey Butler (2025)

=== Coach of the Year ===
- Kevin Borseth (1999, 2000, 2002, 2003, 2004, 2005, 2007, 2014, 2023)
- Matt Bollant (2008, 2009, 2011, 2012)
- Kayla Karius (2026)

=== Sixth-Player of the Year ===
- Kayla Tetschlag (2009)
- Callie Genke (2024)

=== Freshman of the Year/Newcomer of the Year ===
- Chari Nordgaard (1996)
- Trisha Ebel (1999)
- Mandy Stowe (2001)
- Nicole Soulis (2004)
- Tesha Buck (2014)
- Bailey Butler (2022)

=== All-League First Team ===
- Chari Nordgaard (1997, 1998, 1999)
- Trisha Ebel (2000)
- Amanda Leonhard (2000)
- Mandy Stowe (2001)
- Kristy Loisell (2003)
- Abby Scharlow (2004, 2005)
- Tiffany Mor (2005)
- Nicole Soulis (2006, 2007)
- Natalie Berglin (2007)
- Rachel Porath (2008, 2009)
- Lavesa Glover (2009)
- Kayla Tetschlag (2010, 2011)
- Celeste Hoewisch (2010, 2011)
- Julie Wojta (2012)
- Adrian Ritchie (2013)
- Mehryn Kraker (2017)
- Jessica Lindstrom (2018)
- Jen Wellnitz (2019)
- Frankie Wurtz (2020)
- Hailey Oskey (2022)
- Sydney Levy (2023)
- Natalie McNeal (2024, 2025)
- Maddy Schreiber (2025)
- Jenna Guyer (2026)

=== All-League Second Team ===
- Sarah Meyer (1995)
- Chari Nordgaard (1996)
- Rhonda Rice (1996)
- Alison Schultz (1998)
- Trisha Ebel (1999)
- Amanda Leonhard (2001)
- Sarah Boyer (2002, 2003)
- Elizabeth Dudley (2003)
- Nicole Soulis (2004, 2005)
- Natalie Berglin (2006)
- Kayla Groh (2008)
- Lavesa Glover (2008)
- Celeste Hoewisch (2009)
- Julie Wojta (2010, 2011)
- Adrian Ritchie (2012)
- Sarah Eichler (2013)
- Kaili Lukan (2014, 2016)
- Tesha Buck (2015)
- Megan Lukan (2015)
- Mehryn Kraker (2015, 2016)
- Jessica Lindstrom (2017)
- Allie LeClaire (2018)
- Laken James (2019)
- Caitlyn Hibner (2021)
- Bailey Butler (2023)
- Maddy Schreiber (2024)
- Maddy Skorupski (2026)

=== All-League Third Team ===
- Caitlyn Hibner (2020)
- Bailey Butler (2024)
- Meghan Schultz (2026)

=== All-Freshman Team/ All-Newcomer Team ===
- Liz Reiman (1995)
- Chari Nordgaard (1996)
- Trisha Ebel (1999)
- Mandy Stowe (2001)
- Nicole Soulis (2004)
- Kayla Groh (2005)
- Rachel Porath (2006)
- Sarah Eichler (2010)
- Tesha Buck (2014)
- Mehryn Kraker (2014)
- Caitlyn Hibner (2017)
- Karly Murphy (2018)
- Bailey Butler (2022)

=== All-Defensive Team ===
- Rhonda Rice (1996)
- Shelly Beaber (1997)
- Liz Reiman (1997, 1998)
- Alison Schultz (1998)
- Becky Knutson (1999)
- Melanie Tilque (2000, 2001)
- Elizabeth Dudley (2001, 2002, 2003)
- Kristy Loiselle (2002, 2003)
- Mary Kulenkamp (2004, 2005)
- Nicole Soulis (2007)
- Kayla Groh (2007, 2008)
- Rachel Porath (2009)
- Celeste Hoewisch (2010, 2011)
- Kayla Tetschlag (2011)
- Julie Wojta (2012)
- Adrian Ritchie (2013)
- Sarah Eichler (2013)
- Megan Lukan (2014)
- Kali Lukan (2016)
- Jessica Lindstrom (2016, 2017, 2018)
- Jen Wellnitz (2017, 2018, 2019)
- Frankie Wurtz (2020)
- Bailey Butler (2023, 2024, 2025)
- Jasmine Kondrakiewicz (2025)
- Jenna Guyer (2026)

=== All-Academic Team ===
- Amanda Leonhard (2001, 2002)
- Mandy Stowe (2002)
- Kristy Loiselle (2003)
- Abby Scharlow (2004, 2005)
- Tiffany Mor (2005)
- Amanda Popp (2006, 2007)
- Kayla Groh (2007, 2008)
- Erin Templin (2009)
- Julie Wojta (2012)
- Mehryn Kraker (2017)
- Jessica Lindstrom (2018)
- Laken James (2019)
- Jen Wellnitz (2019)
- Frankie Wurtz (2020)
- Caitlyn Hibner (2021)
- Sydney Levy (2023)
- Bailey Butler (2024)
- Natalie McNeal (2024)
- Jenna Guyer (2026)

== Phoenix in the Pros ==
=== WNBA ===
- Chandra Johnson – Los Angeles Sparks (2003)
- Natalie Berglin – Connecticut Sun (2008)
- Julie Wojta
  - 2012: drafted 18th overall by the Minnesota Lynx (Cut after training camp)
  - 2012: re-signed by the Minnesota Lynx
  - 2013: signed by the San Antonio Silver Stars
- Mehryn Kraker
  - 2017: drafted 27th overall by the Washington Mystics

=== Europe ===
- Kayla Tetschlag
- Celeste Hoewisch – Lks Simens Agd Lodz (2012)
- Adrian Ritchie – Nottingham Wildcats (2014)
  - 2014: signed with the Nottingham Wildcats
  - 2014: named European Basketball League Player of the Year

== Retired numbers ==
Green Bay has retired three jersey numbers. Quigley's jersey was retired in 1979 and Barta's jersey was retired in 1988, but there was no official ceremony for either jersey retirement at the time. On February 11, 2011, the numbers were formally dedicated at Kress Events Center. On January 28, 2024, the Phoenix hosted a halftime ceremony to retire Chari Nordgaard's number 33 in the team's 77–59 win over Wright State.

No.	Player	Career
23	Jeanne Barta	1983–1987
33	Chari Nordgaard	1995–1999
46	Mary Quigley	1974–1978

== All-time records ==
=== Career records ===
- Most Points: Chari Nordgaard - 1,964 (1996–1999)
- Most Rebounds: Jeanne Barta (D2) - 1,234 (1984–1987)
- Most Assists: Pam Roecker (D2) - 831 (1980–1983)
- Most Steals: Sue Aspenson (D1-D2) - 315 (1986–1989)
- Most Blocks: Kim Wood - 274 (1991–1994)
- Most 3-Point Field Goals: Mehryn Kraker - 234 (2013–2017)

=== Single season records ===
- Most Points: Chari Nordgaard - 653 (1998–99)
- Most Rebounds: Jeanne Barta (D2) - 345 (1984–85)
- Most Assists: Pam Roecker (D2) - 310 (1982–83)
- Most Steals: Julie Wojta - 127 (2011–12)
- Most Blocks: Kim Wood - 108 (1992–93)
- Most 3-Point Field Goals: Adrian Ritchie - 71 (2012–13)

=== Single-game records ===
- Most Points: Chari Nordgaard - 38 (1999)
- Most Rebounds: Karen Kupper - 22 (1988)
- Most Assists: Pam Roecker (D2) - 15 (1983)
- Most Steals: Julie Wojta - 12 (2012)
- Most 3-Point Field Goals: Trisha Ebel - 9 (2000)
