= 2023–24 Milwaukee Panthers women's basketball team =

American college basketball season

2023–24 Milwaukee Panthers women's basketball
- Conference: Horizon League
- Record: 15–15 (9–10 Horizon)
- Head coach: Kyle Rechlicz (12th season)
- Associate head coach: Stacy Cantley
- Assistant coaches: Anna DeForge; Courtney Shelton
- Home arena: Klotsche Center

2023–24 Horizon League women's basketball standings
	Conf.				Overall
Team	W		L	PCT	W		L	PCT
Cleveland State	18	–	2	.900	29	–	6	.829
Green Bay †	17	–	3	.850	27	–	7	.794
Purdue Fort Wayne	13	–	7	.650	23	–	13	.639
Wright State	11	–	9	.550	18	–	15	.545
Milwaukee	10	–	10	.500	16	–	16	.500
Detroit Mercy	9	–	11	.450	17	–	16	.515
Youngstown State	9	–	11	.450	14	–	18	.438
Oakland	8	–	12	.400	12	–	17	.414
Northern Kentucky	8	–	12	.400	11	–	20	.355
IUPUI	5	–	15	.250	7	–	23	.233
Robert Morris	2	–	18	.100	6	–	24	.200
† 2024 Horizon League tournament winner

The 2023–24 Milwaukee Panthers women's basketball team represented the University of Wisconsin–Milwaukee during the 2023–24 NCAA Division I women's basketball season. The Panthers, led by 12th-year head coach Kyle Rechlicz, played their home games at the Klotsche Center in Milwaukee, Wisconsin as members of the Horizon League.

The Panthers finished the season 16–16, 10–10 in Horizon League play, to finish in fifth place. They were defeated by Wright State in the quarterfinals of the Horizon League tournament.

== Previous season ==
The Panthers finished the 2022–23 season 11–19, 8–12 in Horizon League play, to finish in a tie for seventh place. As the #7 seed in the Horizon League tournament, they defeated #10 seed Robert Morris in the first round, before falling to #2 seed and eventual tournament champions Cleveland State in the quarterfinals.

== Roster ==
2023–24 Milwaukee Panthers women's basketball team
Players
Coaches

Pos.	#	Name	Height	Year	Previous school	Hometown
G	00	Hallie Majoros	5 ft 9 in (1.75 m)	RS So	Nordonia High School	Sagamore Hills, OH
G	1	Vanessa Jurewicz	5 ft 7 in (1.7 m)	Jr	McCook Community College	Stockholm, Sweden
G	2	Jada Williams	5 ft 9 in (1.75 m)	RS Fr	Mason City High School	Mason City, IA
G	3	Sophia Rampulla	5 ft 11 in (1.8 m)	Fr	Union Grove High School	Union Grove, WI
F	4	Anna Lutz	6 ft 1 in (1.85 m)	RS So	Marshall High School	Marshall, WI
F	5	Grace Crowley	5 ft 11 in (1.8 m)	Sr	Homestead High School	Mequon, WI
F	10	Lior Halevi	5 ft 11 in (1.8 m)	RS Jr	Wingate Basketball Academy	Kibbutz Tirat Zvi, Israel
F	11	Izzy Pugh	6 ft 2 in (1.88 m)	Fr	Westlake Girls High School	Auckland, New Zealand
G/F	15	Payton Rechlicz	5 ft 10 in (1.78 m)	Fr	Menomonee Falls High School	Menomonee Falls, WI
G	21	Kalvina Eubanks	5 ft 8 in (1.73 m)	Jr	Walther Christian Academy	Bellwood, IL
G	22	Angie Cera	5 ft 11 in (1.8 m)	Jr	Mukwonago High School	Mukwonago, WI
G	23	Kamy Peppler	5 ft 6 in (1.68 m)	So	Hortonville High School	Hortonville, WI
G	24	Jada Donaldson	5 ft 6 in (1.68 m)	Jr	Beaver Dam High School	Beaver Dam, WI
G	25	Justina Hernandez	5 ft 8 in (1.73 m)	RS So	Glenbard North High School	Carol Stream, IL
G	30	Kendall Nead	5 ft 11 in (1.8 m)	Sr	Johnston High School	Johnston, IA
F	32	Jorey Buwalda	6 ft 0 in (1.83 m)	Fr	Randolph High School	Randolph, WI

Head coach

- Kyle Rechlicz (Wisconsin)

Assistant coach(es)

- Stacy Cantley (UNC Wilmington)
- Anna DeForge (Nebraska)
- Courtney Shelton (Northern Illinois)

Legend

- (C) Team captain
- (S) Suspended
- (I) Ineligible
- (W) Walk-on
- Injured
- Current redshirt

Roster
Last update: February 7, 2024

== Schedule and results ==
Date time, TV	Rank^{#}	Opponent^{#}	Result	Record	High points	High rebounds	High assists	Site (attendance) city, state
Regular season
November 7, 2023*; 6:30 p.m., B1G+		at Wisconsin	L 51–62	0–1	18 – Nead	9 – Crowley	7 – Peppler	Kohl Center (3,120); Madison, WI
November 12, 2023*; 2:00 p.m., ESPN+		UIC	L 70–73	0–2	25 – Peppler	10 – Lutz	6 – Peppler	Klotsche Center (617); Milwaukee, WI
November 16, 2023*; 4:00 p.m.		vs. Louisiana–Monroe; McNeese State Tournament	L 67–73	0–3	21 – Nead	9 – Buwalda	5 – Donaldson	The Legacy Center (127); Lake Charles, LA
November 17, 2023*; 7:00 p.m.		at McNeese; McNeese State Tournament	W 88–67	1–3	38 – Nead	14 – Buwalda	8 – Donaldson	The Legacy Center (1,669); Lake Charles, LA
November 18, 2023*; 1:00 p.m.		vs. Mississippi Valley State; McNeese State Tournament	W 67–61	2–3	20 – Buwalda	12 – Buwalda	8 – Peppler	The Legacy Center (150); Lake Charles, LA
November 21, 2023*; 7:00 p.m., ESPN+		Edgewood	W 70–50	3–3	20 – Nead	7 – Lutz	6 – 2 tied	Klotsche Center (741); Milwaukee, WI
November 25, 2023*; 11:00 a.m., ESPN+		Central Michigan	W 84–59	4–3	23 – Lutz	6 – Buwalda	6 – 2 tied	Klotsche Center (630); Milwaukee, WI
November 30, 2023; 7:00 p.m., ESPN+		Green Bay	L 53–76	4–4 (0–1)	11 – Buwalda	9 – Nead	5 – Nead	Klotsche Center (1,122); Milwaukee, WI
December 3, 2023; 1:00 p.m., ESPN+		at IUPUI	W 70–59	5–4 (1–1)	16 – Nead	7 – 2 tied	6 – Peppler	IUPUI Gymnasium (392); Indianapolis, IN
December 7, 2023*; 7:00 p.m., ESPN+		St. Thomas	L 65–67	5–5	26 – Nead	9 – Lutz	4 – 3 tied	Klotsche Center (704); Milwaukee, WI
December 9, 2023*; 2:00 p.m., ESPN+		at Loyola Chicago	L 47–60	5–6	16 – Nead	6 – Peppler	4 – Peppler	Joseph J. Gentile Arena (328); Chicago, IL
December 15, 2023*; 6:00 p.m., ESPN+		at Eastern Illinois	W 59–52	6–6	19 – Nead	13 – Nead	5 – Peppler	Groniger Arena (175); Charleston, IL
December 20, 2023*; 7:00 p.m., ESPN+		Viterbo	W 100–37	7–6	17 – 2 tied	10 – Lutz	6 – Peppler	Klotsche Center (684); Milwaukee, WI
December 30, 2023; 2:00 p.m., ESPN+		Purdue Fort Wayne	L 55–65	7–7 (1–2)	21 – Nead	11 – Lutz	3 – 2 tied	Klotsche Center (722); Milwaukee, WI
January 1, 2024; 2:00 p.m., ESPN+		Cleveland State	L 59–64	7–8 (1–3)	23 – Lutz	10 – Lutz	5 – Peppler	Klotsche Center (524); Milwaukee, WI
January 5, 2024; 6:00 p.m., ESPN+		at Wright State	L 70–77	7–9 (1–4)	15 – Buwalda	11 – Lutz	3 – 2 tied	Nutter Center (1,185); Fairborn, OH
January 7, 2024; 1:00 p.m., ESPN+		at Northern Kentucky	W 75–67	8–9 (2–4)	24 – Peppler	12 – Buwalda	3 – Peppler	Truist Arena (1,031); Highland Heights, KY
January 11, 2024; 11:00 a.m., ESPN+		Robert Morris	W 73–58	9–9 (3–4)	17 – Buwalda	6 – 2 tied	4 – Donaldson	Klotsche Center (2,917); Milwaukee, WI
January 13, 2024; 12:00 p.m., ESPN+		Youngstown State	W 66–58	10–9 (4–4)	24 – Peppler	9 – Crowley	4 – 2 tied	Klotsche Center (596); Milwaukee, WI
January 18, 2024; 6:00 p.m., ESPN+		at Oakland	W 67–51	11–9 (5–4)	24 – Lutz	11 – Buwalda	14 – Peppler	OU Credit Union O'rena (415); Rochester, MI
January 20, 2024; 12:00 p.m., ESPN+		at Detroit Mercy	L 52–54	11–10 (5–5)	15 – Peppler	6 – 2 tied	4 – Peppler	Calihan Hall (213); Detroit, MI
January 26, 2024; 7:00 p.m., ESPN+		Wright State	W 93–87 ^{OT}	12–10 (6–5)	20 – 2 tied	10 – Crowley	10 – Peppler	Klotsche Center (676); Milwaukee, WI
January 31, 2024; 6:00 p.m., ESPN+		at Robert Morris	W 61–43	13–10 (7–5)	13 – 2 tied	7 – 2 tied	4 – Nead	UPMC Events Center (347); Moon Township, PA
February 3, 2024; 11:00 a.m., ESPN+		at Youngstown State	L 66–73	13–11 (7–6)	21 – Crowley	5 – 2 tied	8 – Donaldson	Beeghly Center (1,724); Youngstown, OH
February 8, 2024; 7:00 p.m., ESPN+		IUPUI	W 73–54	14–11 (8–6)	13 – Crowley	7 – 2 tied	6 – Peppler	Klotsche Center (606); Milwaukee, WI
February 10, 2024; 2:00 p.m., ESPN+		Northern Kentucky	L 66–67	14–12 (8–7)	17 – Lutz	9 – Crowley	7 – Peppler	Klotsche Center (652); Milwaukee, WI
February 15, 2024; 6:00 p.m., ESPN+		at Purdue Fort Wayne	L 55–75	14–13 (8–8)	16 – Cera	5 – 2 tied	4 – Peppler	Hilliard Gates Sports Center (505); Fort Wayne, IN
February 17, 2024; 11:00 a.m., ESPN+		at Cleveland State	L 51–64	14–14 (8–9)	11 – Peppler	8 – Nead	4 – Cera	Wolstein Center (621); Cleveland, OH
February 22, 2024; 7:00 p.m., ESPN+		Detroit Mercy	W 61–55	15–14 (9–9)	19 – Cera	7 – Buwalda	5 – Peppler	Klotsche Center (517); Milwaukee, WI
February 24, 2024; 2:00 p.m., ESPN+		Oakland	L 58–66	15–15 (9–10)	21 – Nead	9 – Crowley	7 – Crowley	Klotsche Center (659); Milwaukee, WI
March 2, 2024; 1:00 p.m., ESPN+		at Green Bay	W 65-61	16-15 (10-10)	25 – Peppler	8 – Buwalda	3 – Donaldson	Kress Events Center (2,371); Green Bay, WI
Horizon League tournament
March 7, 2024; 5:30 p.m., ESPN+	(5)	at (4) Wright State; Quarterfinals	L 60-70	16-16	17 – Lutz	5 – 2 tied	4 – Donaldson	Nutter Center (1,289); Fairborn, OH
*Non-conference game. ^{#}Rankings from AP poll. (#) Tournament seedings in parentheses. All times are in Central.
