= 2023–24 Green Bay Phoenix women's basketball team =

American college basketball season

2023–24 Green Bay Phoenix women's basketball

Horizon League tournament champions

NCAA tournament, First Round
- Conference: Horizon League
- Record: 27–7 (17–3 Horizon)
- Head coach: Kevin Borseth (12th, 21st overall season)
- Associate head coach: Megan Vogel
- Assistant coaches: Sarah Bronk; Patrick Bowlin; Meghan Pingel
- Home arena: Kress Events Center

2023–24 Horizon League women's basketball standings
	Conf.				Overall
Team	W		L	PCT	W		L	PCT
Cleveland State	18	–	2	.900	29	–	6	.829
Green Bay †	17	–	3	.850	27	–	7	.794
Purdue Fort Wayne	13	–	7	.650	23	–	13	.639
Wright State	11	–	9	.550	18	–	15	.545
Milwaukee	10	–	10	.500	16	–	16	.500
Detroit Mercy	9	–	11	.450	17	–	16	.515
Youngstown State	9	–	11	.450	14	–	18	.438
Oakland	8	–	12	.400	12	–	17	.414
Northern Kentucky	8	–	12	.400	11	–	20	.355
IUPUI	5	–	15	.250	7	–	23	.233
Robert Morris	2	–	18	.100	6	–	24	.200
† 2024 Horizon League tournament winner

The 2023–24 Green Bay Phoenix women's basketball team represented the University of Wisconsin–Green Bay during the 2023–24 NCAA Division I women's basketball season. The Phoenix, led by Kevin Borseth in his 12th season in his second stint as head coach, and 20th overall, played their home games at the Kress Events Center in Green Bay, Wisconsin as members of the Horizon League. The leading scorer and the tournament MVP for the 2023-24 season was Natalie McNeal, with Jasmine Kondrakiewicz leading the team in blocks, and Maren Westin leading the Phoenix freshmen in all categories.

== Previous season ==
The Phoenix finished the 2022–23 season 28–5, 18–2 in Horizon League play, to finish as Horizon League regular-season champions. As the #1 seed in the Horizon League tournament, they defeated #9 seed Wright State in the quarterfinals, and #6 seed Purdue Fort Wayne in the semifinals, before falling to #2 seed Cleveland State in the championship game. They received an automatic bid into the WNIT, where they would defeat Niagara in the first round, before falling to Bowling Green in the second round.

== Roster ==
2023–24 Green Bay Phoenix women's basketball team
Players
Coaches

Pos.	#	Name	Height	Year	Previous school	Hometown
G	1	Cassie Schiltz	5 ft 11 in (1.8 m)	RS Jr	Luxemburg-Casco High School	Luxemburg, WI
G	2	Caelan Givens	5 ft 10 in (1.78 m)	Jr	Chippewa Falls High School	Chippewa Falls, WI
G	4	Maren Westin	5 ft 8 in (1.73 m)	Fr	Becker High School	Becker, MN
F	5	Sophie Lahti (redshirt)	6 ft 1 in (1.85 m)	Fr	Pine City High School	Pine City, MN
G	11	Natalie McNeal	5 ft 8 in (1.73 m)	Jr	Saint Louis	Germantown, WI
G	12	Callie Genke	6 ft 0 in (1.83 m)	Jr	Freedom High School	Wrightstown, WI
F	15	Kendall Renard	6 ft 3 in (1.91 m)	Jr	Green Bay Preble High School	Green Bay, WI
F	21	Jasmine Kondrakiewicz	6 ft 1 in (1.85 m)	Jr	Pius XI Catholic High School	Milwaukee, WI
G	22	Bailey Butler	5 ft 7 in (1.7 m)	Jr	Black Hawk High School	South Wayne, WI
G	24	Natalie Andersen	6 ft 0 in (1.83 m)	GS	IUPUI	Mukwonago, WI
F/C	30	Jenna Guyer	6 ft 2 in (1.88 m)	RS So	Centennial High School	Circle Pines, MN
G/F	34	Maddy Schreiber	6 ft 0 in (1.83 m)	Jr	Kimberly High School	Appleton, WI
F/C	55	Meghan Schultz (redshirt)	6 ft 4 in (1.93 m)	Fr	New Berlin West High School	Waukesha, WI

Head coach

- Kevin Borseth (Lake Superior State)

Assistant coach(es)

- Megan Vogel (South Dakota State)
- Sarah Bronk (St. Thomas (MN))
- Patrick Bowlin (St. John's)
- Meghan Pingel (Green Bay)

Legend

- (C) Team captain
- (S) Suspended
- (I) Ineligible
- (W) Walk-on
- Injured
- Current redshirt

Roster
Last update: January 31, 2024

== Schedule and results ==
Date time, TV	Rank^{#}	Opponent^{#}	Result	Record	High points	High rebounds	High assists	Site (attendance) city, state
Exhibition
October 25, 2023*; 7:00 pm		Wisconsin–Stout	W 74–36	–	–	–	–	Kress Events Center; Green Bay, WI
November 1, 2023*; 7:00 pm		Northern Michigan	W 63–56	–	–	–	–	Kress Events Center; Green Bay, WI
Regular season
November 6, 2023*; 6:00 pm, ESPN+		at Northern Iowa	L 67–78	0–1	14 – McNeal	7 – Andersen	4 – Butler	McLeod Center (3,964); Cedar Falls, IA
November 11, 2023*; 12:00 pm, ESPN+		Illinois State	W 88–62	1–1	26 – Genke	6 – Genke	4 – Butler	Kress Events Center (1,863); Green Bay, WI
November 16, 2023*; 6:00 pm, FloHoops		at No. 22 Creighton	W 65–53	2–1	14 – Schreiber	5 – 2 tied	4 – 2 tied	D. J. Sokol Arena (1,027); Omaha, NE
November 23, 2023*; 12:30 pm, FloHoops		vs. UMass; Cancún Challenge Mayan Division	W 85–52	3–1	16 – Schiltz	7 – 2 tied	3 – Butler	Hard Rock Hotel Riviera Maya (200); Cancún, Mexico
November 24, 2023*; 12:30 pm, FloHoops		vs. Maryland; Cancún Challenge Mayan Division	L 59–68	3–2	12 – Schreiber	8 – McNeal	8 – Schiltz	Hard Rock Hotel Riviera Maya (111); Cancún, Mexico
November 25, 2023*; 12:30 pm, FloHoops		vs. No. 23 Washington State; Cancún Challenge Mayan Division	W 59–48	4–2	12 – Schreiber	6 – McNeal	5 – Butler	Hard Rock Hotel Riviera Maya (136); Cancún, Mexico
November 30, 2023; 7:00 pm, ESPN+		at Milwaukee	W 76–53	5–2 (1–0)	23 – Schreiber	8 – McNeal	5 – Butler	Klotsche Center (1,122); Milwaukee, WI
December 5, 2023*; 11:00 am, FloHoops		at DePaul	L 64–68	5–3	16 – 2 tied	7 – McNeal	4 – Butler	Wintrust Arena (6,057); Chicago, IL
December 13, 2023*; 7:00 pm, ESPN+		UIC	W 64–56	6–3	19 – McNeal	5 – 3 tied	6 – Butler	Kress Events Center (1,738); Green Bay, WI
December 16, 2023*; 4:00 pm, ESPN+		Saint Louis	W 87–54	7–3	19 – Schreiber	6 – 2 tied	7 – Butler	Kress Events Center (1,756); Green Bay, WI
December 19, 2023*; 7:00 pm, ESPN+		Parkside	W 94–55	8–3	16 – Schiltz	9 – McNeal	8 – Schiltz	Kress Events Center (1,850); Green Bay, WI
December 30, 2023; 1:00 pm, ESPN+		Cleveland State	W 85–72	9–3 (2–0)	27 – Schiltz	8 – McNeal	8 – Butler	Kress Events Center (2,421); Green Bay, WI
January 1, 2024; 1:00 pm, ESPN+		Purdue Fort Wayne	W 72–46	10–3 (3–0)	19 – Schreiber	6 – Schiltz	9 – Schiltz	Kress Events Center (1,704); Green Bay, WI
January 5, 2024; 6:00 pm, ESPN+		at Northern Kentucky	W 86–56	11–3 (4–0)	20 – Butler	7 – McNeal	6 – Butler	Truist Arena (1,094); Highland Heights, KY
January 7, 2024; 12:00 pm, ESPN+		at Wright State	W 75–63	12–3 (5–0)	20 – Schreiber	11 – Schiltz	5 – Butler	Nutter Center (1,098); Fairborn, OH
January 11, 2024; 7:00 pm, ESPN+		Youngstown State	W 85–47	13–3 (6–0)	16 – Kondrakiewicz	9 – McNeal	4 – Butler	Kress Events Center (1,531); Green Bay, WI
January 13, 2024; 1:00 pm, ESPN+		Robert Morris	W 72–40	14–3 (7–0)	18 – McNeal	10 – Schiltz	7 – Butler	Kress Events Center (1,614); Green Bay, WI
January 18, 2024; 6:00 pm, ESPN+		at Detroit Mercy	W 75–48	15–3 (8–0)	14 – Butler	4 – 3 tied	5 – Butler	Calihan Hall (251); Detroit, MI
January 20, 2024; 1:00 pm, ESPN+		at Oakland	L 81–83	15–4 (8–1)	24 – McNeal	4 – Kondrakiewicz	4 – Butler	OU Credit Union O'rena (520); Rochester, MI
January 24, 2024; 6:00 pm, ESPN+		at IUPUI	W 87–59	16–4 (9–1)	21 – Kondrakiewicz	12 – Kondrakiewicz	6 – Butler	IUPUI Gymnasium (471); Indianapolis, IN
January 28, 2024; 1:00 pm, ESPN+		Wright State	W 77–59	17–4 (10–1)	20 – Kondrakiewicz	7 – Kondrakiewicz	5 – 2 tied	Kress Events Center (2,365); Green Bay, WI
February 3, 2024; 1:00 pm, ESPN+		at Cleveland State	L 63–86	17–5 (10–2)	30 – McNeal	9 – McNeal	6 – Butler	Wolstein Center (848); Cleveland, OH
February 8, 2024; 7:00 pm, ESPN+		Northern Kentucky	W 67–51	18–5 (11–2)	16 – Schreiber	16 – McNeal	5 – Butler	Kress Events Center (1,862); Green Bay, WI
February 10, 2024; 1:00 pm, ESPN+		IUPUI	W 71–52	19–5 (12–2)	26 – McNeal	15 – McNeal	4 – Schreiber	Kress Events Center (2,115); Green Bay, WI
February 15, 2024; 6:00 pm, ESPN+		at Robert Morris	W 60–50	20–5 (13–2)	14 – Schiltz	8 – McNeal	3 – Schreiber	UPMC Events Center (354); Moon Township, PA
February 17, 2024; 12:30 pm, ESPN+		at Youngstown State	W 71–59	21–5 (14–2)	18 – 2 tied	10 – McNeal	9 – Butler	Beeghly Center (1,884); Youngstown, OH
February 22, 2024; 7:00 pm, ESPN+		Oakland	W 74–45	22–5 (15–2)	15 – Schreiber	10 – 2 tied	10 – Butler	Kress Events Center (1,990); Green Bay, WI
February 24, 2024; 1:00 pm, ESPN+		Detroit Mercy	W 87–44	23–5 (16–2)	18 – Andersen	7 – Andersen	7 – Butler	Kress Events Center (2,272); Green Bay, WI
February 28, 2024; 6:00 pm, ESPN+		at Purdue Fort Wayne	W 70–61	24–5 (17–2)	14 – 3 tied	12 – Kondrakiewicz	8 – Butler	Hilliard Gates Sports Center (589); Fort Wayne, IN
March 2, 2024; 1:00 pm, ESPN+		Milwaukee	L 61–65	24–6 (17–3)	14 – Guyer	9 – McNeal	4 – tied	Kress Events Center (2,371); Green Bay, WI
Horizon League tournament
March 7, 2024; 5:30 pm, ESPN+	(2)	(7) Youngstown State; Quarterfinals	W 94–57	25–6	16 – Schiltz	6 – tied	6 – Kondrakiewicz	Kress Events Center (2,019); Green Bay, WI
March 11, 2024; 1:30 pm, ESPN+	(2)	vs. (3) Purdue Fort Wayne; Semifinals	W 64–55	26–6	16 – Genke	7 – McNeal	10 – Butler	Indiana Farmers Coliseum; Indianapolis, IN
March 11, 2024; 11:00 am, ESPNU	(2)	vs. (1) Cleveland State; Championship	W 64–40	27–6	32 – McNeal	8 – tied	7 – Butler	Indiana Farmers Coliseum; Indianapolis, IN
NCAA tournament
March 23, 2024*; 11:00 am, ESPN	(11 P4)	vs. (6 P4) Tennessee; First round	L 63–92	27–7	13 – Schreiber	7 – McNeal	4 – Butler	Reynolds Coliseum; Raleigh, NC
*Non-conference game. ^{#}Rankings from AP poll. (#) Tournament seedings in parentheses. All times are in Central.
