= 2023–24 Wright State Raiders women's basketball team =

American college basketball season

2023–24 Wright State Raiders women's basketball
- Conference: Horizon League
- Record: 18–15 (11–9 Horizon)
- Head coach: Kari Hoffman (3rd season)
- Associate head coach: John Leonzo
- Assistant coaches: Megan Leuzinger; Patrick Bain
- Home arena: Nutter Center

2023–24 Horizon League women's basketball standings
	Conf.				Overall
Team	W		L	PCT	W		L	PCT
Cleveland State	18	–	2	.900	29	–	6	.829
Green Bay †	17	–	3	.850	27	–	7	.794
Purdue Fort Wayne	13	–	7	.650	23	–	13	.639
Wright State	11	–	9	.550	18	–	15	.545
Milwaukee	10	–	10	.500	16	–	16	.500
Detroit Mercy	9	–	11	.450	17	–	16	.515
Youngstown State	9	–	11	.450	14	–	18	.438
Oakland	8	–	12	.400	12	–	17	.414
Northern Kentucky	8	–	12	.400	11	–	20	.355
IUPUI	5	–	15	.250	7	–	23	.233
Robert Morris	2	–	18	.100	6	–	24	.200
† 2024 Horizon League tournament winner

The 2023–24 Wright State Raiders women's basketball team represented Wright State University during the 2023–24 NCAA Division I women's basketball season. The Raiders, led by third-year head coach Kari Hoffman, played their home games at the Nutter Center in Fairborn, Ohio as members of the Horizon League.

The Raiders finished the season 18–15, 11–9 in Horizon League play, to finish in fourth place. They defeated Milwaukee before falling to top-seeded Cleveland State in the semifinals of the Horizon League tournament.

== Previous season ==
The Raiders finished the 2022–23 season 8–24, 6–14 in Horizon League play, to finish in ninth place. In the Horizon League tournament, they defeated Oakland in the first round before falling to top-seeded Green Bay in the quarterfinals.

== Roster ==
2023–24 Wright State Raiders women's basketball team
Players
Coaches

Pos.	#	Name	Height	Year	Previous school	Hometown
F	0	Jada Tate	5 ft 11 in (1.8 m)	GS	Tiffin	Pickerington, OH
G	1	Rylee Sagester	5 ft 7 in (1.7 m)	Fr	Tri-Village High School	West Alexandria, OH
F	2	Cara VanKempen	6 ft 1 in (1.85 m)	GS	Valparaiso	Coopersville, MI
G	3	Makiya Miller	5 ft 7 in (1.7 m)	So	Reynoldsburg High School	Reynoldsburg, OH
G	5	Makira Webster	5 ft 7 in (1.7 m)	RS Jr	Wabash Valley College	Sidney, OH
G	10	Alexis Hutchison	5 ft 7 in (1.7 m)	GS	Malone	Centerville, OH
F	11	Rachel Loobie	6 ft 1 in (1.85 m)	Sr	Central Michigan	Indianapolis, IN
G	12	Ellie Magestro-Kennedy	5 ft 9 in (1.75 m)	Fr	Janesville Craig High School	Stoughton, WI
G	15	Claire Henson	5 ft 10 in (1.78 m)	So	LIU	Germantown, OH
G	20	Layne Ferrell	6 ft 2 in (1.88 m)	RS Sr	Akron	Franklin, OH
G	21	Lauren Scott	5 ft 7 in (1.7 m)	So	Worthington Kilbourne High School	Columbus, OH
G	23	Macie Taylor	5 ft 7 in (1.7 m)	RS Fr	Troy High School	Troy, OH
G	24	Kacee Baumhower	5 ft 9 in (1.75 m)	Jr	St. Bonaventure	Sylvania, OH
F	30	Catalina Ion	6 ft 0 in (1.83 m)	So	IMG Academy	Bucharest, Romania

Head coach

- Kari Hoffman (Cedarville)

Assistant coach(es)

- John Leonzo (Cedarville)
- Megan Leuzinger (Liberty)
- Patrick Bain (Cedarville)

Legend

- (C) Team captain
- (S) Suspended
- (I) Ineligible
- (W) Walk-on
- Injured
- Current redshirt

Roster
Last update: February 5, 2024

== Schedule and results ==
Date time, TV	Rank^{#}	Opponent^{#}	Result	Record	High points	High rebounds	High assists	Site (attendance) city, state
Exhibition
November 1, 2023*; 8:00 p.m.		Tiffin	W 80–43	–	–	–	–	Nutter Center; Fairborn, OH
Regular season
November 6, 2023*; 8:00 p.m., ESPN+		at Southern Indiana	L 63–67	0–1	19 – Hutchison	6 – 3 tied	5 – Baumhower	Screaming Eagles Arena (653); Evansville, IN
November 12, 2023*; 2:00 p.m., B1G+		at Michigan State	L 55–99	0–2	16 – VanKempen	8 – Loobie	6 – Miller	Breslin Center (3,137); East Lansing, MI
November 14, 2023*; 4:00 p.m., ESPN+		Mount Vernon Nazarene	W 88–64	1–2	19 – Baumhower	5 – 2 tied	4 – 2 tied	Nutter Center (1,026); Fairborn, OH
November 18, 2023*; 1:00 p.m., ESPN+		at Indiana State	W 72–63	2–2	26 – Hutchison	14 – Ferrell	3 – Hutchison	Hulman Center (1,142); Terre Haute, IN
November 20, 2023*; 7:00 p.m., ESPN+		Slippery Rock	W 82–45	3–2	17 – Baumhower	8 – Taylor	4 – Hutchison	Nutter Center (944); Fairborn, OH
November 27, 2023*; 7:00 p.m., ESPN+		Marshall	W 89–78	4–2	17 – Ferrell	7 – 2 tied	10 – Hutchison	Nutter Center (1,157); Fairborn, OH
November 30, 2023; 7:00 p.m., ESPN+		IUPUI	W 79–67	5–2 (1–0)	22 – Hutchison	9 – Loobie	5 – Hutchison	Nutter Center (1,015); Fairborn, OH
December 3, 2023; 2:00 p.m., ESPN+		at Purdue Fort Wayne	L 60–71	5–3 (1–1)	18 – Hutchison	9 – Hutchison	3 – Baumhower	Hilliard Gates Sports Center (543); Fort Wayne, IN
December 9, 2023*; 4:00 p.m., ESPN+		Eastern Illinois	W 81–67	6–3	32 – Hutchison	8 – Loobie	5 – Miller	Nutter Center (1,219); Fairborn, OH
December 12, 2023*; 11:00 a.m., ESPN+		Bowling Green	L 48–69	6–4	16 – Ferrell	6 – 2 tied	4 – Miller	Nutter Center (7,574); Fairborn, OH
December 18, 2023*; 10:00 a.m., ESPN+		at West Virginia	L 72–77	6–5	37 – Hutchison	6 – Loobie	4 – 2 tied	WVU Coliseum (7,535); Morgantown, WV
December 21, 2023*; 5:30 p.m., FloHoops		vs. Wyoming; Las Vegas Holiday Hoops Tournament	L 61–71	6–6	28 – Hutchison	7 – Hutchison	3 – Hutchison	South Point Arena; Enterprise, NV
December 22, 2023*; 5:30 p.m., FloHoops		vs. Presbyterian; Las Vegas Holiday Hoops Tournament	W 66–61	7–6	14 – 2 tied	8 – Hutchison	3 – Baumhower	South Point Arena; Enterprise, NV
December 29, 2023; 6:30 p.m., ESPN+		at Youngstown State	W 82–68	8–6 (2–1)	26 – Hutchison	6 – 2 tied	2 – 4 tied	Beeghly Center (1,285); Youngstown, OH
December 31, 2023; 12:00 p.m., ESPN+		at Robert Morris	W 80–77 ^{OT}	9–6 (3–1)	25 – Ferrell	10 – Hutchison	4 – 2 tied	UPMC Events Center (189); Moon Township, PA
January 5, 2024; 7:00 p.m., ESPN+		Milwaukee	W 77–70	10–6 (4–1)	24 – Hutchison	7 – Loobie	5 – Loobie	Nutter Center (1,185); Fairborn, OH
January 7, 2024; 1:00 p.m., ESPN+		Green Bay	L 63–75	10–7 (4–2)	19 – Baumhower	8 – Ferrell	5 – Ferrell	Nutter Center (1,098); Fairborn, OH
January 11, 2024; 7:00 p.m., ESPN+		at IUPUI	W 74–64	11–7 (5–2)	16 – Hutchison	12 – Loobie	5 – Hutchison	IUPUI Gymnasium (456); Indianapolis, IN
January 17, 2024; 7:00 p.m., ESPN+		Cleveland State	L 61–72	11–8 (5–3)	15 – Ferrell	9 – Tate	3 – Hutchison	Nutter Center (1,149); Fairborn, OH
January 20, 2024; 4:00 p.m., ESPN+		at Northern Kentucky	W 90–83	12–8 (6–3)	24 – 2 tied	8 – Loobie	3 – 3 tied	Truist Arena (1,342); Highland Heights, KY
January 26, 2024; 8:00 p.m., ESPN+		at Milwaukee	L 87–93 ^{OT}	12–9 (6–4)	34 – Hutchison	9 – Loobie	3 – 3 tied	Klotsche Center (676); Milwaukee, WI
January 28, 2024; 2:00 p.m., ESPN+		at Green Bay	L 59–77	12–10 (6–5)	17 – Hutchison	7 – Loobie	5 – Hutchison	Kress Events Center (2,365); Green Bay, WI
January 31, 2024; 7:00 p.m., ESPN+		Oakland	W 80–68	13–10 (7–5)	21 – Hutchison	10 – Hutchison	6 – Hutchison	Nutter Center (1,103); Fairborn, OH
February 2, 2024; 7:00 p.m., ESPN+		Detroit Mercy	W 59–53	14–10 (8–5)	23 – Hutchison	6 – 3 tied	3 – Baumhower	Nutter Center (1,108); Fairborn, OH
February 7, 2024; 7:00 p.m., ESPN+		at Cleveland State	L 59–71	14–11 (8–6)	17 – Ferrell	7 – Tate	7 – Hutchison	Wolstein Center (330); Cleveland, OH
February 10, 2024; 4:00 p.m., ESPN+		Purdue Fort Wayne	W 70–66	15–11 (9–6)	22 – Hutchison	12 – Loobie	3 – Ferrell	Nutter Center (1,273); Fairborn, OH
February 14, 2024; 7:00 p.m., ESPN+		Youngstown State	L 52–72	15–12 (9–7)	15 – Baumhower	8 – Hutchison	4 – Hutchison	Nutter Center (1,167); Fairborn, OH
February 17, 2024; 4:00 p.m., ESPN+		Northern Kentucky	L 63–77	15–13 (9–8)	13 – 2 tied	15 – Loobie	5 – Hutchison	Nutter Center (1,230); Fairborn, OH
February 21, 2024; 7:00 p.m., ESPN+		Robert Morris	W 76–68	16–13 (10–8)	26 – Hutchison	16 – Hutchison	4 – Baumhower	Nutter Center (1,144); Fairborn, OH
February 29, 2024; 7:00 p.m., ESPN+		at Oakland	L 82–84 ^{2OT}	16–14 (10–9)	29 – Hutchison	8 – 2 tied	5 – Baumhower	OU Credit Union O'rena (326); Rochester, MI
March 2, 2024; 1:00 p.m., ESPN+		at Detroit Mercy	W 66–56	17–14 (11–9)	22 – Hutchison	9 – Ferrell	3 – 2 tied	Calihan Hall (405); Detroit, MI
Horizon League tournament
March 7, 2024; 5:30 p.m., ESPN+	(4)	(5) Milwaukee; Quarterfinals	W 70–60	18–14	23 – Hutchison	10 – Loobie	6 – Baumhower	Nutter Center (1,289); Fairborn, OH
March 11, 2024; 12:00 p.m., ESPN+	(4)	vs. (1) Cleveland State; Semifinals	L 50–83	18–15	22 – Hutchison	7 – Hutchison	5 – Hutchison	Indiana Farmers Coliseum; Indianapolis, IN
*Non-conference game. ^{#}Rankings from AP poll. (#) Tournament seedings in parentheses. All times are in Eastern.
