= 2023–24 Oakland Golden Grizzlies women's basketball team =

American college basketball season

2023–24 Oakland Golden Grizzlies women's basketball
- Conference: Horizon League
- Record: 11–15 (7–11 Horizon)
- Head coach: Jeff Tungate (11th season)
- Assistant coaches: Crystal Davis; Tim Webb; Deanna Richard; Myron Brown
- Home arena: OU Credit Union O'rena

2023–24 Horizon League women's basketball standings
	Conf.				Overall
Team	W		L	PCT	W		L	PCT
Cleveland State	18	–	2	.900	29	–	6	.829
Green Bay †	17	–	3	.850	27	–	7	.794
Purdue Fort Wayne	13	–	7	.650	23	–	13	.639
Wright State	11	–	9	.550	18	–	15	.545
Milwaukee	10	–	10	.500	16	–	16	.500
Detroit Mercy	9	–	11	.450	17	–	16	.515
Youngstown State	9	–	11	.450	14	–	18	.438
Oakland	8	–	12	.400	12	–	17	.414
Northern Kentucky	8	–	12	.400	11	–	20	.355
IUPUI	5	–	15	.250	7	–	23	.233
Robert Morris	2	–	18	.100	6	–	24	.200
† 2024 Horizon League tournament winner

The 2023–24 Oakland Golden Grizzlies women's basketball team represented Oakland University during the 2023–24 NCAA Division I women's basketball season. The Golden Grizzlies, led by eleventh-year head coach Jeff Tungate, played their home games at the OU Credit Union O'rena in Rochester, Michigan as members of the Horizon League.

== Previous season ==
The Golden Grizzlies finished the 2022–23 season 13–17, 8–12 in Horizon League play, to finish in a tie for seventh place. In the Horizon League tournament, they were defeated by Wright State in the first round.

== Roster ==
2023–24 Oakland Golden Grizzlies women's basketball team
Players
Coaches

Pos.	#	Name	Height	Year	Previous school	Hometown
G	0	Naveyah Damon	6 ft 0 in (1.83 m)	Fr	Miami Country Day School	Miami, FL
G	1	Jasmine Dupree-Hebert	5 ft 8 in (1.73 m)	Fr	Hopkins High School	Dayton, MN
G	2	Maddy Skorupski	5 ft 8 in (1.73 m)	So	Michigan State	Clarkston, MI
G/F	3	Linda van Schaik	5 ft 10 in (1.78 m)	Sr	Louisiana–Monroe	Oud-Beijerland, Netherlands
PG	5	Brooke Quarles-Daniels	5 ft 7 in (1.7 m)	So	L'Anse Creuse High School	Macomb Township, MI
G	10	Markyia McCormick	5 ft 6 in (1.68 m)	GS	Charleston	Pickerington, OH
F	12	Kianni Westbrook	6 ft 3 in (1.91 m)	GS	Tennessee State	Augusta, GA
F	13	Eva Pardo-Campillo	6 ft 1 in (1.85 m)	So	Centro Galicia	Asturias, Spain
G	21	Madison Royal-Davis	5 ft 11 in (1.8 m)	Jr	Butler	Toledo, OH
F	23	Alexis Johnson	5 ft 10 in (1.78 m)	Sr	Marshall	Farmington Hills, MI
G	25	Kennedie Montue	5 ft 11 in (1.8 m)	Jr	Plum High School	Pittsburgh, PA
F	33	Miriam Ibezim	6 ft 2 in (1.88 m)	Jr	Gates Chili High School	Rochester, NY
C	40	Lianna Baxter	6 ft 2 in (1.88 m)	So	Oconto High School	Marinette, WI
F	45	Cam Grant	6 ft 1 in (1.85 m)	So	Ball State	Washington Township, MI

Head coach

- Jeff Tungate (Oakland)

Assistant coach(es)

- Crystal Davis (Berea)
- Tim Webb (Rochester Christian)
- Deanna Richard (Oakland)
- Myron Brown (Rochester Christian)

Legend

- (C) Team captain
- (S) Suspended
- (I) Ineligible
- (W) Walk-on
- Injured
- Current redshirt

Roster
Last update: February 7, 2024

== Schedule and results ==
Date time, TV	Rank^{#}	Opponent^{#}	Result	Record	High points	High rebounds	High assists	Site (attendance) city, state
Regular season
November 6, 2023*; 7:00 p.m., ESPN+		at Akron	W 91–87 ^{2OT}	1–0	21 – van Schaik	10 – Ibezim	4 – Quarles-Daniels	James A. Rhodes Arena (797); Akron, OH
November 8, 2023*; 6:30 p.m., B1G+		at Michigan State	L 62–87	1–1	18 – McCormick	9 – Quarles-Daniels	4 – Skorupski	Breslin Center (2,596); East Lansing, MI
November 14, 2023*; 7:00 p.m., B1G+		at Michigan	L 39–80	1–2	10 – 2 tied	6 – Quarles-Daniels	1 – 3 tied	Crisler Center (2,307); Ann Arbor, MI
November 17, 2023*; 7:00 p.m., ESPN+		Cleary	W 110–51	2–2	17 – Royal-Davis	7 – Royal-Davis	6 – Skorupski	OU Credit Union O'rena; Rochester, MI
November 25, 2023*; 5:30 p.m., ESPN+		Madonna	W 122–38	3–2	16 – Johnson	7 – 2 tied	6 – 2 tied	OU Credit Union O'rena (672); Rochester, MI
November 30, 2023; 7:00 p.m., ESPN+		Purdue Fort Wayne	L 66–84	3–3 (0–1)	26 – McCormick	10 – Quarles-Daniels	6 – Quarles-Daniels	OU Credit Union O'rena (439); Rochester, MI
December 3, 2023; 1:00 p.m., ESPN+		at Detroit Mercy	L 55–66	3–4 (0–2)	13 – McCormick	7 – Westbrook	4 – van Schaik	Calihan Hall (405); Detroit, MI
December 7, 2023*; 12:00 p.m., FloHoops		at Xavier	Postponed					Cintas Center; Cincinnati, OH
December 9, 2023*; 2:00 p.m., ESPN+		Central Michigan	W 79–76	4–4	19 – Skorupski	8 – 2 tied	4 – 2 tied	OU Credit Union O'rena (604); Rochester, MI
December 17, 2023*; 7:00 p.m., ESPN+		Toledo	L 65–78	4–5	16 – Quarles-Daniels	8 – Johnson	3 – 2 tied	OU Credit Union O'rena (628); Rochester, MI
December 21, 2023*; 7:00 p.m., ESPN+		Miami (OH)	L 66–68 ^{OT}	4–6	22 – Quarles-Daniels	6 – 2 tied	3 – Skorupski	OU Credit Union O'rena (612); Rochester, MI
December 29, 2023; 7:00 p.m., ESPN+		Northern Kentucky	W 89–79	5–6 (1–2)	21 – Johnson	13 – Ibezim	4 – Quarles-Daniels	OU Credit Union O'rena (715); Rochester, MI
January 3, 2024; 6:30 p.m., ESPN+		at Youngstown State	L 63–70	5–7 (1–3)	15 – Quarles-Daniels	13 – van Schaik	2 – Quarles-Daniels	Beeghly Center (1,277); Youngstown, OH
January 7, 2024; 12:00 p.m., ESPN+		at Robert Morris	W 64–58	6–7 (2–3)	14 – Montue	10 – Quarles-Daniels	4 – McCormick	UPMC Events Center (223); Moon Township, PA
January 10, 2024; 7:00 p.m., ESPN+		at Purdue Fort Wayne	L 59–79	6–8 (2–4)	17 – McCormick	9 – Quarles-Daniels	3 – McCormick	Hilliard Gates Sports Center (304); Fort Wayne, IN
January 13, 2024; 2:00 p.m., ESPN+		Detroit Mercy	W 89–55	7–8 (3–4)	20 – Montue	11 – Ibezim	3 – Dupree-Hebert	OU Credit Union O'rena (597); Rochester, MI
January 18, 2024; 7:00 p.m., ESPN+		Milwaukee	L 51–67	7–9 (3–5)	13 – 2 tied	13 – Ibezim	1 – 5 tied	OU Credit Union O'rena (415); Rochester, MI
January 20, 2024; 2:00 p.m., ESPN+		Green Bay	W 83–81	8–9 (4–5)	27 – Quarles-Daniels	8 – Ibezim	3 – Quarles-Daniels	OU Credit Union O'rena (520); Rochester, MI
January 25, 2024; 7:00 p.m., ESPN+		Cleveland State	L 65–77	8–10 (4–6)	15 – Quarles-Daniels	7 – Quarles-Daniels	3 – 2 tied	OU Credit Union O'rena (517); Rochester, MI
January 28, 2024; 4:00 p.m., ESPN+		at IUPUI	W 65–59	9–10 (5–6)	13 – Skorupski	11 – Ibezim	2 – Johnson	IUPUI Gymnasium (374); Indianapolis, IN
January 31, 2024; 7:00 p.m., ESPN+		at Wright State	L 68–80	9–11 (5–7)	13 – 3 tied	10 – Ibezim	7 – Quarles-Daniels	Nutter Center (1,103); Fairborn, OH
February 2, 2024; 7:00 p.m., ESPN+		at Northern Kentucky	L 82–90	9–12 (5–8)	17 – Quarles-Daniels	6 – Quarles-Daniels	3 – Quarles-Daniels	Truist Arena (1,259); Highland Heights, KY
February 8, 2024; 7:00 p.m., WMYD/ESPN+		Youngstown State	L 79–85	9–13 (5–9)	19 – McCormick	7 – Quarles-Daniels	8 – Quarles-Daniels	OU Credit Union O'rena (358); Rochester, MI
February 10, 2024; 2:00 p.m., ESPN+		Robert Morris	W 67–65	10–13 (6–9)	13 – McCormick	9 – Quarles-Daniels	3 – McCormick	OU Credit Union O'rena (639); Rochester, MI
February 15, 2024; 11:00 a.m., ESPN+		at Cleveland State	L 63–78	10–14 (6–10)	18 – van Schaik	9 – Ibezim	4 – Quarles-Daniels	Wolstein Center (3,347); Cleveland, OH
February 22, 2024; 8:00 p.m., ESPN+		at Green Bay	L 45–74	10–15 (6–11)	11 – Quarles-Daniels	7 – Quarles-Daniels	5 – McCormick	Kress Events Center (1,990); Green Bay, WI
February 24, 2024; 3:00 p.m., ESPN+		at Milwaukee	W 66–58	11–15 (7–11)	19 – Quarles-Daniels	8 – Quarles-Daniels	6 – Quarles-Daniels	Klotsche Center (659); Milwaukee, WI
February 29, 2024; 7:00 p.m., WMYD/ESPN+		Wright State	W 84-82 ^{2OT}	12-15 (8-11)	31 – van Schaik	8 – Skorupski	6 – Skorupski	OU Credit Union O'rena (326); Rochester, MI
March 2, 2024; 2:00 p.m., ESPN+		IUPUI	L 71-91	12-16 (8-12)	17 – McCormick	8 – Grant	3 – Quarles-Daniels	OU Credit Union O'rena (403); Rochester, MI
Horizon League tournament
March 5, 2024; 7:00 pm, ESPN+	(8)	(9) Northern Kentucky; First Round	W 70-62	12-17	22 – Skorupski	10 – Quarles-Daniels	5 – Quarles-Daniels	OU Credit Union O'rena (322); Rochester, MI
*Non-conference game. ^{#}Rankings from AP poll. (#) Tournament seedings in parentheses. All times are in Eastern.
