= 2023–24 Youngstown State Penguins women's basketball team =

American college basketball season

2023–24 Youngstown State Penguins women's basketball
- Conference: Horizon League
- Record: 13–15 (9–9 Horizon)
- Head coach: John Nicolais (interim)
- Assistant coaches: Teonna Jewell; Malika Glover
- Home arena: Beeghly Center

2023–24 Horizon League women's basketball standings
	Conf.				Overall
Team	W		L	PCT	W		L	PCT
Cleveland State	18	–	2	.900	29	–	6	.829
Green Bay †	17	–	3	.850	27	–	7	.794
Purdue Fort Wayne	13	–	7	.650	23	–	13	.639
Wright State	11	–	9	.550	18	–	15	.545
Milwaukee	10	–	10	.500	16	–	16	.500
Detroit Mercy	9	–	11	.450	17	–	16	.515
Youngstown State	9	–	11	.450	14	–	18	.438
Oakland	8	–	12	.400	12	–	17	.414
Northern Kentucky	8	–	12	.400	11	–	20	.355
IUPUI	5	–	15	.250	7	–	23	.233
Robert Morris	2	–	18	.100	6	–	24	.200
† 2024 Horizon League tournament winner

The 2023–24 Youngstown State Penguins women's basketball team represented Youngstown State University during the 2023–24 NCAA Division I women's basketball season. The Penguins, led by interim head coach John Nicolais, played their home games at the Beeghly Center in Youngstown, Ohio as members of the Horizon League.

On October 2, 2023, it was announced that head coach John Barnes would be taking a leave of absence to focus on "personal family matters," with associate head coach John Nicolais serving as acting head coach in Barnes' absence. On January 19, 2024, Barnes announced that he would be stepping down after ten years at the helm, with associate head coach John Nicolais serving as interim head coach for the remainder of the season.

== Previous season ==
The Penguins finished the 2022–23 season 19–11, 13–7 in Horizon League play, to finish in a tie for third place. In the Horizon League tournament, they were defeated by Northern Kentucky in the quarterfinals.

== Roster ==
2023–24 Youngstown State Penguins women's basketball team
Players
Coaches

Pos.	#	Name	Height	Year	Previous school	Hometown
G	0	Mady Aulbach	5 ft 5 in (1.65 m)	Sr	Blackhawk High School	Beaver Falls, PA
G	2	Malia Magestro	5 ft 9 in (1.75 m)	Sr	Kennedy Catholic High School	Hermitage, PA
G	10	Dena Jarrells	5 ft 7 in (1.7 m)	Sr	Chattanooga	Dunlow, WV
G	11	Abby Liber	6 ft 0 in (1.83 m)	So	Saint Louis	Avon, OH
G	14	Abbie Davidson	5 ft 5 in (1.65 m)	Fr	Salem High School	Salem, OH
G	20	Mackenzie Hurd	5 ft 10 in (1.78 m)	RS Fr	Nelsonville-York High School	Buchtel, OH
G	21	Amya McLeod	5 ft 6 in (1.68 m)	Fr	Rome Free Academy	Rome, NY
G	22	Shay-Lee Kirby	5 ft 10 in (1.78 m)	Sr	Austin Peay	Vienna, WV
G	23	Haley Thierry	5 ft 8 in (1.73 m)	Jr	Laurel School	Willoughby Hills, OH
G	24	Bella Samz	5 ft 9 in (1.75 m)	Fr	Arrowhead High School	Oconomowoc, WI
F	31	Emily Saunders	6 ft 5 in (1.96 m)	Sr	Tennessee	Mullens, WV
F	32	Paige Shy	5 ft 10 in (1.78 m)	Sr	Marshall	Huntington, WV
F	40	Jen Wendler	6 ft 2 in (1.88 m)	Sr	Owen-Withee High School	Withee, WI
F	52	Lindsey Linard	6 ft 4 in (1.93 m)	Sr	Duquesne	Cleveland, OH

Head coach

- John Nicolais (interim) (Glenville State)

Assistant coach(es)

- Teonna Jewell (Davis & Elkins)
- Malika Glover (Northern Kentucky)

Legend

- (C) Team captain
- (S) Suspended
- (I) Ineligible
- (W) Walk-on
- Injured
- Current redshirt

Roster
Last update: February 8, 2024

== Schedule and results ==
Date time, TV	Rank^{#}	Opponent^{#}	Result	Record	High points	High rebounds	High assists	Site (attendance) city, state
Regular season
November 8, 2023*; 6:30 p.m., ESPN+		Xavier	W 55–41	1–0	31 – Saunders	14 – Saunders	6 – Kirby	Beeghly Center (1,259); Youngstown, OH
November 11, 2023*; 6:30 p.m., ESPN+		Slippery Rock	W 78–32	2–0	22 – Saunders	9 – Saunders	5 – Jarrells	Beeghly Center (1,612); Youngstown, OH
November 16, 2023*; 5:00 p.m., ESPN+		Western Michigan	L 52–54	2–1	15 – Shy	6 – Shy	6 – Jarrells	Beeghly Center (1,182); Youngstown, OH
November 19, 2023*; 4:00 p.m., ESPN+		at West Virginia	L 40–94	2–2	12 – Jarrells	5 – Saunders	2 – 2 tied	WVU Coliseum (1,619); Morgantown, WV
November 24, 2023*; 5:30 p.m.		vs. Rhode Island; Las Vegas Holiday Classic	L 50–63	2–3	10 – Kirby	4 – 2 tied	4 – Kirby	Orleans Arena; Paradise, NV
November 25, 2023*; 5:30 p.m.		vs. Northern Arizona; Las Vegas Holiday Classic	L 70–74	2–4	21 – 2 tied	6 – 2 tied	4 – 3 tied	Orleans Arena; Paradise, NV
November 30, 2023; 6:30 p.m., ESPN+		Detroit Mercy	L 50–59	2–5 (0–1)	12 – Saunders	8 – Shy	5 – Jarrells	Beeghly Center (1,523); Youngstown, OH
December 3, 2023; 12:00 p.m., ESPN+		at Robert Morris	L 63–65	2–6 (0–2)	16 – Thierry	8 – 2 tied	4 – Kirby	UPMC Events Center (311); Moon Township, PA
December 6, 2023*; 6:30 p.m., ESPN+		Akron	W 53–52	3–6	13 – Saunders	8 – 2 tied	5 – Magestro	Beeghly Center (1,761); Youngstown, OH
December 9, 2023*; 4:00 p.m., NEC Front Row		at Saint Francis	W 69–32	4–6	23 – Saunders	8 – Thierry	5 – 2 tied	DeGol Arena (124); Loretto, PA
December 16, 2023*; 1:00 p.m., ESPN+		at St. Bonaventure	L 47–55	4–7	18 – Kirby	7 – Saunders	5 – Jarrells	Reilly Center (225); St. Bonaventure, NY
December 21, 2023*; 11:00 a.m., ESPN+		Canisius	L 59–65	4–8	22 – Jarrells	7 – 2 tied	6 – Jarrells	Beeghly Center (2,251); Youngstown, OH
December 29, 2023; 6:30 p.m., ESPN+		Wright State	L 68–82	4–9 (0–3)	22 – Magestro	8 – Magestro	5 – Jarrells	Beeghly Center (1,285); Youngstown, OH
December 31, 2023; 12:00 p.m., ESPN+		IUPUI	W 58–56	5–9 (1–3)	19 – Saunders	9 – Saunders	5 – Magestro	Beeghly Center (2,147); Youngstown, OH
January 3, 2024; 6:30 p.m., ESPN+		Oakland	W 70–63	6–9 (2–3)	18 – 2 tied	6 – Linard	6 – Shy	Beeghly Center (1,277); Youngstown, OH
January 6, 2024; 1:00 p.m., ESPN+		at Cleveland State	L 37–79	6–10 (2–4)	7 – Thierry	6 – Thierry	3 – Shy	Wolstein Center (368); Cleveland, OH
January 11, 2024; 8:00 p.m., ESPN+		at Green Bay	L 47–85	6–11 (2–5)	10 – 2 tied	7 – Shy	4 – Shy	Kress Events Center (1,531); Green Bay, WI
January 13, 2024; 1:00 p.m., ESPN+		at Milwaukee	L 58–66	6–12 (2–6)	18 – Magestro	9 – Saunders	4 – Magestro	Klotsche Center (596); Milwaukee, WI
January 18, 2024; 6:30 p.m., ESPN+		Purdue Fort Wayne	W 66–57	7–12 (3–6)	16 – 3 tied	7 – Shy	6 – Shy	Beeghly Center (1,726); Youngstown, OH
January 24, 2024; 6:30 p.m., ESPN+		Northern Kentucky	L 56–62	7–13 (3–7)	17 – Saunders	7 – 3 tied	4 – 2 tied	Beeghly Center (1,304); Youngstown, OH
January 27, 2024; 1:30 p.m., ESPN+		Robert Morris	W 71–46	8–13 (4–7)	23 – Saunders	11 – Thierry	4 – 3 tied	Beeghly Center (3,102); Youngstown, OH
January 31, 2024; 11:00 a.m., ESPN+		at IUPUI	L 63–69	8–14 (4–8)	18 – Saunders	10 – Saunders	3 – Jarrells	IUPUI Gymnasium (349); Indianapolis, IN
February 3, 2024; 12:00 p.m., ESPN+		Milwaukee	W 73–66	9–14 (5–8)	23 – Magestro	10 – Saunders	4 – Saunders	Beeghly Center (1,724); Youngstown, OH
February 8, 2024; 7:00 p.m., ESPN+		at Oakland	W 85–79	10–14 (6–8)	24 – Kirby	7 – Thierry	6 – Thierry	OU Credit Union O'rena (358); Rochester, MI
February 10, 2024; 1:00 p.m., ESPN+		at Detroit Mercy	W 54–49	11–14 (7–8)	12 – Jarrells	8 – Saunders	5 – Magestro	Calihan Hall (303); Detroit, MI
February 14, 2024; 7:00 p.m., ESPN+		at Wright State	W 72–52	12–14 (8–8)	14 – Magestro	8 – Jarrells	5 – Kirby	Nutter Center (1,167); Fairborn, OH
February 17, 2024; 1:30 p.m., ESPN+		Green Bay	L 59–71	12–15 (8–9)	19 – Saunders	11 – Saunders	7 – Jarrells	Beeghly Center (1,884); Youngstown, OH
February 24, 2024; 2:00 p.m., ESPN+		at Northern Kentucky	W 68–64	13–15 (9–9)	25 – Jarrells	16 – Saunders	5 – Aullbach	Truist Arena (1,132); Highland Heights, KY
February 27, 2024; 6:30 p.m., ESPN+		Cleveland State	L 53-56	13-16 (9-10)	14 – Shay-Lee	8 – 2 tied	6 – Magestro	Beeghly Center (1,947); Youngstown, OH
March 2, 2024; 3:00 p.m., ESPN+		at Purdue Fort Wayne	L 64-73	13-17 (9-11)	17 – Saunders	9 – Saunders	5 – Jarrells	Hilliard Gates Sports Center (820); Fort Wayne, IN
Horizon League tournament
March 5, 2024; 7:00 pm, ESPN+	(7)	(10) IUPUI; First Round	W 73-50	14-17	18 – Magestro	6 – Saunders	5 – Aulbach	Beeghly Center (929); Youngstown, OH
March 7, 2024; 5:30 pm, ESPN+	(7)	at (2) Green Bay; Quarterfinals	L 57-94	14-18	15 – Kirby	6 – Saunders	7 – Jarrells	Kress Events Center (2,019); Green Bay, WI
*Non-conference game. ^{#}Rankings from AP poll. (#) Tournament seedings in parentheses. All times are in Eastern.
