= 2023–24 Detroit Mercy Titans women's basketball team =

American college basketball season

2023–24 Detroit Mercy Titans women's basketball
- Conference: Horizon League
- Record: 15–14 (8–10 Horizon)
- Head coach: Kate Achter (2nd season)
- Associate head coach: Nicole "Colie" Shelwick
- Assistant coaches: Juanita Cochran; Kiefer Haffey; Andrea Cecil
- Home arena: Calihan Hall

2023–24 Horizon League women's basketball standings
	Conf.				Overall
Team	W		L	PCT	W		L	PCT
Cleveland State	18	–	2	.900	29	–	6	.829
Green Bay †	17	–	3	.850	27	–	7	.794
Purdue Fort Wayne	13	–	7	.650	23	–	13	.639
Wright State	11	–	9	.550	18	–	15	.545
Milwaukee	10	–	10	.500	16	–	16	.500
Detroit Mercy	9	–	11	.450	17	–	16	.515
Youngstown State	9	–	11	.450	14	–	18	.438
Oakland	8	–	12	.400	12	–	17	.414
Northern Kentucky	8	–	12	.400	11	–	20	.355
IUPUI	5	–	15	.250	7	–	23	.233
Robert Morris	2	–	18	.100	6	–	24	.200
† 2024 Horizon League tournament winner

The 2023–24 Detroit Mercy Titans women's basketball team represented the University of Detroit Mercy during the 2023–24 NCAA Division I women's basketball season. The Titans, led by second-year head coach Kate Achter, played their home games at Calihan Hall in Detroit, Michigan as members of the Horizon League.

The Titans finished the season 17–16, 9–11 in Horizon League play, to finish in tie for sixth place. They defeated Robert Morris before falling to Purdue Fort Wayne in the quarterfinals of the Horizon League tournament.

== Previous season ==
The Titans finished the 2022–23 season 5–25, 3–17 in Horizon League play, to finish in last (11th) place. As the #11 seed in the Horizon League tournament, they were defeated by #6 seed Purdue Fort Wayne in the first round.

== Roster ==
2023–24 Detroit Mercy Titans women's basketball team
Players
Coaches

Pos.	#	Name	Height	Year	Previous school	Hometown
G	0	Imani McNeal	5 ft 8 in (1.73 m)	GS	South Georgia Tech	Locust Grove, GA
G	1	Irene Murua	5 ft 6 in (1.68 m)	Sr	Louisiana Tech	Mondragón, Spain
G	2	Makayla Jackson	5 ft 8 in (1.73 m)	Fr	Bullis School	Alexandria, va
G	3	Jaida Hampton	5 ft 10 in (1.78 m)	GS	SIU Edwardsville	Lansing, MI
G	4	Myonna Hooper	5 ft 5 in (1.65 m)	So	West Bloomfield HS	West Bloomfield, MI
G	10	Paris Gilmore	5 ft 6 in (1.68 m)	Fr	Warrensville Heights HS	Youngstown, OH
G	11	Cyd Rivera	5 ft 6 in (1.68 m)	GS	Pepperdine	Woodside, NY
G	12	Maddie Diabate	5 ft 9 in (1.75 m)	Jr	Georgia Highlands	Paris, France
G	13	Annika Corcoran	5 ft 5 in (1.65 m)	RS Sr	Akron	Chardon, OH
F	15	Emma Trawally Porta	6 ft 1 in (1.85 m)	Jr	Institut Thalassa	Tiana, Spain
F	21	Latifa Amzil	6 ft 0 in (1.83 m)	Jr	Chipola College	Helsinki, Finland
G	22	Amaya Burch	5 ft 9 in (1.75 m)	So	Timber Creek HS	Sicklerville, NJ
F	23	Jada Moorehead	5 ft 8 in (1.73 m)	Sr	Moberly Area CC	Jackson, MI
G	24	Kamari Forrest	5 ft 10 in (1.78 m)	Fr	Saginaw HS	Saginaw, MI
G	55	Lucia Fleta Robles	5 ft 7 in (1.7 m)	Sr	Laramie County CC	San Cristóbal de La Laguna, Spain

Head coach

- Kate Achter (Bowling Green)

Assistant coach(es)

- Nicole "Colie" Shelwick (Belhaven)
- Juanita Cochran (Wayne State)
- Kiefer Haffey (Wayne State)
- Andrea Cecil (Florida Gulf Coast)

Legend

- (C) Team captain
- (S) Suspended
- (I) Ineligible
- (W) Walk-on
- Injured
- Current redshirt

Roster
Last update: February 6, 2024

== Schedule and results ==
Date time, TV	Rank^{#}	Opponent^{#}	Result	Record	High points	High rebounds	High assists	Site (attendance) city, state
Exhibition
November 1, 2023*; 11:00 a.m.		Lake Erie	W 82–32	–	–	–	–	Calihan Hall; Detroit, MI
Regular season
November 6, 2023*; 7:00 p.m., ESPN+		at Eastern Michigan	W 68–38	1–0	13 – Gilmore	11 – Trawally Porta	5 – McNeal	George Gervin GameAbove Center (1,426); Ypsilanti, MI
November 10, 2023*; 7:00 p.m., ESPN+		Chicago State	W 83–48	2–0	15 – Hooper	14 – Trawally Porta	3 – 2 tied	Calihan Hall (480); Detroit, MI
November 12, 2023*; 5:00 p.m., FloHoops		at Butler	L 61–68	2–1	10 – 2 tied	9 – Murua	4 – McNeal	Hinkle Fieldhouse (1,162); Indianapolis, IN
November 16, 2023*; 6:30 p.m., B1G+		at Michigan State	L 44–105	2–2	9 – 2 tied	5 – Hooper	2 – 4 tied	Breslin Center (2,936); East Lansing, MI
November 18, 2023*; 12:00 p.m., ESPN+		at Dayton	W 76–60	3–2	21 – Murua	9 – 2 tied	6 – Hooper	UD Arena (1,586); Dayton, OH
November 24, 2023*; 2:00 p.m.		vs. USC Upstate; GATA Turkey Throwdown	W 71–64	4–2	16 – Amzil	10 – Murua	5 – McNeal	Hanner Fieldhouse (100); Statesboro, GA
November 25, 2023*; 4:30 p.m., ESPN+		at Georgia Southern; GATA Turkey Throwdown	L 59–81	4–3	17 – Murua	8 – Trawally Porta	3 – 2 tied	Hanner Fieldhouse (502); Statesboro, GA
November 30, 2023; 6:30 p.m., ESPN+		at Youngstown State	W 59–50	5–3 (1–0)	16 – Hooper	10 – Murua	3 – Hooper	Beeghly Center (1,523); Youngstown, OH
December 3, 2023; 1:00 p.m., ESPN+		Oakland	W 66–55	6–3 (2–0)	13 – Corcoran	11 – Murua	2 – 4 tied	Calihan Hall (405); Detroit, MI
December 6, 2023*; 7:00 p.m., ESPN+		at Western Michigan	W 62–59	7–3	17 – Murua	8 – 2 tied	3 – McNeal	University Arena (640); Kalamazoo, MI
December 10, 2023*; 2:00 p.m., ESPN+		at Northern Illinois	L 66–75	7–4	16 – Trawally Porta	6 – Murua	5 – Hooper	Convocation Center; DeKalb, IL
December 18, 2023*; 6:30 p.m., ESPN+		at Bellarmine	W 59–49	8–4	19 – Hooper	11 – Murua	5 – McNeal	Freedom Hall (252); Louisville, KY
December 21, 2023*; 1:00 p.m., ESPN+		Florida A&M	W 72–66	9–4	17 – Hooper	8 – Murua	2 – 4 tied	Calihan Hall (289); Detroit, MI
January 1, 2024; 1:00 p.m., ESPN+		Northern Kentucky	W 67–55	10–4 (3–0)	23 – Trawally Porta	14 – Trawally Porta	4 – 2 tied	Calihan Hall (313); Detroit, MI
January 4, 2024; 7:00 p.m., ESPN+		at IUPUI	L 76–81 ^{OT}	10–5 (3–1)	22 – Murua	12 – Murua	4 – Hooper	IUPUI Gymnasium (416); Indianapolis, IN
January 7, 2024; 1:00 p.m., ESPN+		Purdue Fort Wayne	W 60–56	11–5 (4–1)	14 – Gilmore	9 – Murua	2 – 3 tied	Calihan Hall (279); Detroit, MI
January 10, 2024; 7:00 p.m., ESPN+		at Cleveland State	L 53–74	11–6 (4–2)	20 – McNeal	8 – Murua	3 – 2 tied	Wolstein Center (313); Cleveland, OH
January 13, 2024; 2:00 p.m., ESPN+		at Oakland	L 55–89	11–7 (4–3)	10 – Moorehead	8 – Murua	3 – Fleta Robles	OU Credit Union O'rena (597); Rochester, MI
January 18, 2024; 7:00 p.m., ESPN+		Green Bay	L 48–75	11–8 (4–4)	11 – Trawally Porta	9 – Trawally Porta	2 – 4 tied	Calihan Hall (251); Detroit, MI
January 20, 2024; 1:00 p.m., ESPN+		Milwaukee	W 54–52	12–8 (5–4)	13 – McNeal	8 – Murua	2 – McNeal	Calihan Hall (213); Detroit, MI
January 24, 2024; 7:00 p.m., ESPN+		at Robert Morris	W 56–39	13–8 (6–4)	14 – Trawally Porta	10 – Trawally Porta	4 – McNeal	UPMC Events Center (177); Moon Township, PA
January 27, 2024; 1:00 p.m., ESPN+		Cleveland State	W 69–56	14–8 (7–4)	20 – Burch	9 – 2 tied	5 – Gilmore	Calihan Hall (251); Detroit, MI
January 31, 2024; 11:00 a.m., ESPN+		at Northern Kentucky	L 54–73	14–9 (7–5)	15 – Murua	9 – Trawally Porta	4 – McNeal	Truist Arena (4,122); Highland Heights, KY
February 2, 2024; 7:00 p.m., ESPN+		at Wright State	L 53–59	14–10 (7–6)	17 – Trawally Porta	10 – 2 tied	3 – Hooper	Nutter Center (1,108); Fairborn, OH
February 8, 2024; 7:00 p.m., ESPN+		Robert Morris	W 68–49	15–10 (8–6)	13 – Forrest	13 – Trawally Porta	3 – 3 tied	Calihan Hall (248); Detroit, MI
February 10, 2024; 1:00 p.m., ESPN+		Youngstown State	L 49–54	15–11 (8–7)	14 – McNeal	7 – 4 tied	4 – Hooper	Calihan Hall (303); Detroit, MI
February 18, 2024; 2:00 p.m., ESPN+		at Purdue Fort Wayne	L 67–77	15–12 (8–8)	16 – Burch	9 – Trawally Porta	4 – Murua	Hilliard Gates Sports Center (729); Fort Wayne, IN
February 22, 2024; 8:00 p.m., ESPN+		at Milwaukee	L 55–61	15–13 (8–9)	18 – Moorehead	9 – Trawally Porta	4 – 2 tied	Klotsche Center (517); Milwaukee, WI
February 24, 2024; 2:00 p.m., ESPN+		at Green Bay	L 44–87	15–14 (8–10)	9 – Jackson	5 – Moorehead	3 – Hooper	Kress Events Center (2,272); Green Bay, WI
February 29, 2024; 7:00 p.m., ESPN+		IUPUI	W 64–59	16–14 (9–10)	22 – Murua	9 – McNeal	4 – Burch	Calihan Hall (378); Detroit, MI
March 2, 2024; 1:00 p.m., ESPN+		Wright State	L 56–66	16–15 (9–11)	15 – Murua	13 – Murua	2 – 2 tied	Calihan Hall (405); Detroit, MI
Horizon League tournament
March 5, 2024; 7:00 pm, ESPN+	(6)	(11) Robert Morris; First round	W 59–48	17–15	12 – Murua	10 – Moorehead	3 – Trawally Porta	Calihan Hall (359); Detroit, MI
March 7, 2024; 7:00 pm, ESPN+	(6)	at (3) Purdue Fort Wayne; Quarterfinals	L 35–66	17–16	10 – Trawally Porta	9 – Murua	2 – 2 tied	Hilliard Gates Sports Center (667); Fort Wayne, IN
*Non-conference game. ^{#}Rankings from AP poll. (#) Tournament seedings in parentheses. All times are in Eastern.
