= 2023–24 Robert Morris Colonials women's basketball team =

American college basketball season

2023–24 Robert Morris Colonials women's basketball
- Conference: Horizon League
- Record: 6–22 (2–17 Horizon)
- Head coach: Charlie Buscaglia (8th season; first 21 games, resigned Feb. 12); Scott Schneider (interim, rest of season)
- Assistant coach: Blessing Freeman
- Home arena: UPMC Events Center

2023–24 Horizon League women's basketball standings
| | Conf. | | | | Overall |
| Team | W | | L | PCT | W | | L | PCT |
|---|---|---|---|---|---|---|---|---|
| Cleveland State | 18 | – | 2 | .900 | 29 | – | 6 | .829 |
| Green Bay † | 17 | – | 3 | .850 | 27 | – | 7 | .794 |
| Purdue Fort Wayne | 13 | – | 7 | .650 | 23 | – | 13 | .639 |
| Wright State | 11 | – | 9 | .550 | 18 | – | 15 | .545 |
| Milwaukee | 10 | – | 10 | .500 | 16 | – | 16 | .500 |
| Detroit Mercy | 9 | – | 11 | .450 | 17 | – | 16 | .515 |
| Youngstown State | 9 | – | 11 | .450 | 14 | – | 18 | .438 |
| Oakland | 8 | – | 12 | .400 | 12 | – | 17 | .414 |
| Northern Kentucky | 8 | – | 12 | .400 | 11 | – | 20 | .355 |
| IUPUI | 5 | – | 15 | .250 | 7 | – | 23 | .233 |
| Robert Morris | 2 | – | 18 | .100 | 6 | – | 24 | .200 |
† 2024 Horizon League tournament winner

The 2023–24 Robert Morris Colonials women's basketball team represented Robert Morris University during the 2023–24 NCAA Division I women's basketball season. The Colonials, led by eighth-year head coach Charlie Buscaglia, played their home games at the UPMC Events Center located in Moon Township, Pennsylvania as members of the Horizon League.

== Previous season ==
The Colonials finished the 2022–23 season 11–19, 5–15 in Horizon League play to finish in tenth place. In the Horizon League tournament, they were defeated by Milwaukee in the first round.

== Roster ==
2023–24 Robert Morris Colonials women's basketball team
Players
Coaches

| Pos. | # | Name | Height | Year | Previous school | Hometown |
|---|---|---|---|---|---|---|
| G | 0 | Madison O'Dell | 5 ft 6 in (1.68 m) | Fr | Gulfport High School | Gulfport, Mississippi |
| F | 1 | Tuana Coskun | 6 ft 0 in (1.83 m) | Fr | Rabun Gap-Nacoochee School | Istanbul, Turkey |
| G | 2 | Stephanie Theodossakos | 5 ft 10 in (1.78 m) | Jr | Tampa | Boca Raton, Florida |
| G | 3 | Louella Allana | 5 ft 4 in (1.63 m) | So | TPLS Christian Academy | Laval, Quebec |
| C | 4 | Danielle Vuletich | 6 ft 2 in (1.88 m) | Jr | Western Reserve Academy | Columbiana, Ohio |
| G/F | 7 | Naomi Barnwell | 6 ft 1 in (1.85 m) | Jr | Monroe College | Chanteloup-les-Vignes, France |
| G | 8 | Alejandra Mastral | 5 ft 8 in (1.73 m) | Jr | The British School of Argon | Zaragoza, Spain |
| G/F | 9 | Eden Monka | 5 ft 10 in (1.78 m) | Fr | Dawson College | Montreal, Quebec |
| G | 11 | Micah O'Dell | 6 ft 0 in (1.83 m) | Fr | Gulfport High School | Gulfport, Mississippi |
| F | 12 | Paris Kirk | 6 ft 2 in (1.88 m) | So | Putnam Science Academy | Kelowna, British Columbia |
| G | 13 | Hattie McGraw | 5 ft 7 in (1.7 m) | Fr | Knoch High School | Saxonburg, Pennsylvania |
| G | 14 | Rebecca Dwomoh | 5 ft 10 in (1.78 m) | Jr | Nottingham Academy | London, England |
| G | 15 | Natalie Johnson | 5 ft 8 in (1.73 m) | So | North Point High School | Waldorf, Maryland |
| C | 24 | Camila Bozan | 6 ft 1 in (1.85 m) | Fr | Downey Christian School | Santiago, Chile |
| G | 35 | Simone Morris | 5 ft 10 in (1.78 m) | Jr | Long Beach Poly High School | Carson, California |

Head coach

- Charlie Buscaglia (Manhattan)

Assistant coach(es)

- Scott Schneider (Robert Morris)
- Blessing Freeman (Mississippi State)

Legend

- (C) Team captain
- (S) Suspended
- (I) Ineligible
- (W) Walk-on
- Injured
- Current redshirt

Roster
Last update: February 9, 2024

== Schedule and results ==
| Date time, TV | Rank^{#} | Opponent^{#} | Result | Record | High points | High rebounds | High assists | Site (attendance) city, state |
Regular season
| November 6, 2023*; 7:00 pm, NEC Front Row | | at Saint Francis | W 61–50 | 1–0 | 13 – 2 Tied | 10 – Vuletich | 3 – Allana | DeGol Arena (392); Loretto, PA |
| November 11, 2023*; 1:30 pm, ESPN+ | | at St. Bonaventure | L 52–70 | 1–1 | 17 – Morris | 6 – Vuletich | 4 – Mastral | Reilly Center (4,500); St. Bonaventure, NY |
| November 15, 2023*; 11:00 am, ESPN+ | | Akron | L 58–63 ^{OT} | 1–2 | 14 – Barnwell | 9 – Barnwell | 4 – Ma. O'Dell | UPMC Events Center (510); Moon Township, PA |
| November 18, 2023*; 3:00 pm, ESPN+ | | at George Mason | L 63–83 | 1–3 | 12 – Mastral | 5 – 2 Tied | 2 – 3 Tied | EagleBank Arena (915); Fairfax, VA |
| November 21, 2023*; 7:00 pm, ESPN+ | | Penn State Beaver | W 89–39 | 2–3 | 18 – Vuletich | 12 – Kirk | 6 – Allana | UPMC Events Center (329); Moon Township, PA |
| November 24, 2023*; 2:00 pm, ESPN+ | | at Bucknell | L 54–68 | 2–4 | 13 – 2 Tied | 7 – Kirk | 3 – Mastral | Sojka Pavilion (310); Lewisburg, PA |
| November 29, 2023; 7:00 pm, ESPN+ | | at Cleveland State | L 59–72 | 2–5 (0–1) | 16 – Morris | 11 – Vuletich | 4 – Allana | Wolstein Center (247); Cleveland, OH |
| December 3, 2023; 12:00 pm, ESPN+ | | Youngstown State | W 65–63 | 3–5 (1–1) | 19 – Barnwell | 11 – Barnwell | 9 – Allana | UPMC Events Center (311); Moon Township, PA |
| December 9, 2023*; 1:00 pm, SECN+ | | at Texas A&M | L 36–67 | 3–6 | 7 – 3 Tied | 5 – Mi. O'Dell | 3 – Mastral | Reed Arena (3,558); College Station, TX |
| December 16, 2023*; 12:00 pm, ESPN+ | | Charleston | W 71–65 | 4–6 | 19 – Vuletich | 16 – Vuletich | 7 – Mastral | UPMC Events Center (207); Moon Township, PA |
| December 18, 2023*; 7:00 pm, ESPN+ | | Fairmont State | W 66–55 | 5–6 | 12 – Vuletich | 10 – Vuletich | 6 – Allana | UPMC Events Center (173); Moon Township, PA |
| December 29, 2023; 7:00 pm, ESPN+ | | IUPUI | W 60–49 | 6–6 (2–1) | 18 – Morris | 6 – Vuletich | 4 – Allana | UPMC Events Center (315); Moon Township, PA |
| December 31, 2023; 12:00 pm, ESPN+ | | Wright State | L 77–80 ^{OT} | 6–7 (2–2) | 17 – Morris | 13 – Vuletich | 6 – Vuletich | UPMC Events Center (189); Moon Township, PA |
| January 4, 2024; 7:00 pm, ESPN+ | | at Purdue Fort Wayne | L 56–68 | 6–8 (2–3) | 11 – Ma. O'Dell | 9 – Vuletich | 2 – 3 Tied | Hilliard Gates Sports Center (513); Fort Wayne, IN |
| January 7, 2024; 12:00 pm, ESPN+ | | Oakland | L 58–64 | 6–9 (2–4) | 14 – Dwomoh | 8 – Dwomoh | 3 – Mastral | UPMC Events Center (223); Moon Township, PA |
| January 11, 2024; 12:00 pm, ESPN+ | | at Milwaukee | L 58–73 | 6–10 (2–5) | 12 – Coskun | 5 – Dwomoh | 3 – Dwomoh | Klotsche Center (2,917); Milwaukee, WI |
| January 13, 2024; 2:00 pm, ESPN+ | | at Green Bay | L 40–72 | 6–11 (2–6) | 11 – 2 Tied | 9 – Morris | 3 – Johnson | Kress Events Center (1,614); Green Bay, WI |
| January 17, 2024; 7:00 pm, ESPN+ | | at Northern Kentucky | L 51–83 | 6–12 (2–7) | 10 – Dwomoh | 6 – Dwomoh | 2 – Allana | Truist Arena (922); Highland Heights, KY |
| January 20, 2024; 12:00 pm, ESPN+ | | Purdue Fort Wayne | L 36–64 | 6–13 (2–8) | 14 – Morris | 7 – Vuletich | 2 – 3 Tied | UPMC Events Center (224); Moon Township, PA |
| January 24, 2024; 7:00 pm, ESPN+ | | Detroit Mercy | L 39–56 | 6–14 (2–9) | 12 – Vuletich | 12 – Vuletich | 4 – 2 Tied | UPMC Events Center (177); Moon Township, PA |
| January 27, 2024; 1:30 pm, ESPN+ | | at Youngstown State | L 46–71 | 6–15 (2–10) | 10 – 2 Tied | 9 – Barnwell | 3 – 2 Tied | Beeghly Center (3,102); Youngstown, OH |
| January 31, 2024; 7:00 pm, ESPN+ | | Milwaukee | L 43–61 | 6–16 (2–11) | 15 – Barnwell | 8 – Barnwell | 2 – 2 Tied | UPMC Events Center (347); Moon Township, PA |
| February 8, 2024; 7:00 pm, ESPN+ | | at Detroit Mercy | L 49–68 | 6–17 (2–12) | 12 – Johnson | 7 – Barnwell | 2 – Allana | Calihan Hall (248); Detroit, MI |
| February 10, 2024; 2:00 pm, ESPN+ | | at Oakland | L 65–67 | 6–18 (2–13) | 19 – Morris | 10 – Vuletich | 4 – 2 Tied | OU Credit Union O'rena (639); Rochester, MI |
| February 15, 2024; 7:00 pm, ESPN+ | | Green Bay | L 50–60 | 6–19 (2–14) | 14 – O'Dell | 8 – Vuletich | 2 – 3 Tied | UPMC Events Center (354); Moon Township, PA |
| February 18, 2024; 2:00 pm, ESPN+ | | at IUPUI | L 50–70 | 6–20 (2–15) | 15 – Vuletich | 4 – Barnwell | 3 – Allana | IUPUI Gymnasium (391); Indianapolis, IN |
| February 21, 2024; 7:00 pm, ESPN+ | | at Wright State | L 68–76 | 6–21 (2–16) | 14 – Morris | 6 – 2 Tied | 4 – Barnwell | Nutter Center (1,144); Fairborn, OH |
| February 24, 2024; 12:00 pm, ESPN+ | | Cleveland State | L 40–79 | 6–22 (2–17) | 13 – Vuletich | 6 – Kirk | 3 – Barnwell | UPMC Events Center (357); Moon Township, PA |
| February 27, 2024; 7:00 pm, ESPN+ | | Northern Kentucky | L 52-76 | 6-23 (2-18) | 19 – Vuletich | 10 – Vuletich | 2 – Dwomoh | UPMC Events Center (252); Moon Township, PA |
Horizon League tournament
| March 5, 2024; 7:00 pm, ESPN+ | (11) | at (6) Detroit Mercy; First Round | L 48-59 | 6-24 | 15 – 2 Tied | 8 – Vuletich | 2 – Allana | Calihan Hall (359); Detroit, MI |
*Non-conference game. ^{#}Rankings from AP Poll. (#) Tournament seedings in parentheses. All times are in Eastern.
