= 2023–24 Cleveland State Vikings women's basketball team =

American college basketball season

2023–24 Cleveland State Vikings women's basketball

Horizon League regular season champions

WBIT, First Round
- Conference: Horizon League
- Record: 29–6 (18–2 Horizon)
- Head coach: Chris Kielsmeier (6th season)
- Assistant coaches: Melissa Jackson; Frozena Jerro; Shelby Zoeckler
- Home arena: Wolstein Center

2023–24 Horizon League women's basketball standings
	Conf.				Overall
Team	W		L	PCT	W		L	PCT
Cleveland State	18	–	2	.900	29	–	6	.829
Green Bay †	17	–	3	.850	27	–	7	.794
Purdue Fort Wayne	13	–	7	.650	23	–	13	.639
Wright State	11	–	9	.550	18	–	15	.545
Milwaukee	10	–	10	.500	16	–	16	.500
Detroit Mercy	9	–	11	.450	17	–	16	.515
Youngstown State	9	–	11	.450	14	–	18	.438
Oakland	8	–	12	.400	12	–	17	.414
Northern Kentucky	8	–	12	.400	11	–	20	.355
IUPUI	5	–	15	.250	7	–	23	.233
Robert Morris	2	–	18	.100	6	–	24	.200
† 2024 Horizon League tournament winner

The 2023–24 Cleveland State Vikings women's basketball team represented Cleveland State University during the 2023–24 NCAA Division I women's basketball season. The Vikings, led by sixth-year head coach Chris Kielsmeier, played their home games at the Wolstein Center in Cleveland, Ohio as members of the Horizon League.

== Previous season ==
The Vikings finished the 2022–23 season 30–5, 17–3 in Horizon League play to finish in second place. In the Horizon League tournament, they defeated Milwaukee in the quarterfinals, Northern Kentucky in the semifinals, and top-seeded Green Bay to win the Horizon League championship and earn the conference's automatic bid into the NCAA tournament, clinching their first NCAA tournament appearance since 2010. They received the #13 seed in the Greenville Regional 2, where they would lose to #4 region seed Villanova in the first round.

== Roster ==
2023–24 Cleveland State Vikings women's basketball team
Players
Coaches

Pos.	#	Name	Height	Year	Previous school	Hometown
G	0	Mickayla Perdue	5 ft 6 in (1.68 m)	Sr	Glenville State	Springfield, Ohio
F	1	Brooklynn Fort-Davis	6 ft 0 in (1.83 m)	GS	Howard	Chicago, Illinois
G	2	Destiny Leo (injured)	5 ft 10 in (1.78 m)	Sr	North High School	Willowick, Ohio
G	3	Shadiya Thomas	5 ft 8 in (1.73 m)	Sr	Tyler Junior College	Cypress, Texas
F	4	Grace Ellis	6 ft 0 in (1.83 m)	Sr	Wyoming	Brisbane, Australia
F	5	Kali Howard	5 ft 11 in (1.8 m)	Jr	Hutchinson Community College	Zachary, Louisiana
F	10	Jordana Reisma	6 ft 3 in (1.91 m)	So	Brown Deer High School	Brown Deer, Wisconsin
G	11	Colbi Maples	5 ft 8 in (1.73 m)	Jr	Grambling State	Earle, Arkansas
G	12	Sara Guerreiro	5 ft 10 in (1.78 m)	Sr	South Florida	Seixal, Portugal
G	13	Carmen Villalobos	6 ft 1 in (1.85 m)	Sr	Hartford	Cádiz, Spain
G	14	Filippa Goula	5 ft 6 in (1.68 m)	Sr	Saint Francis (PA)	Ano Liosia, Greece
F	22	Faith Burch	6 ft 1 in (1.85 m)	RS So	Harding High School	Warren, Ohio
F	24	Paulina Hernandez	6 ft 2 in (1.88 m)	Fr	Oak Creek High School	Oak Creek, Wisconsin

Head coach

- Chris Kielsmeier (Iowa State)

Assistant coach(es)

- Melissa Jackson (Richmond)
- Frozena Jerro (Arizona State)
- Shelby Zoeckler (Cleveland State)

Legend

- (C) Team captain
- (S) Suspended
- (I) Ineligible
- (W) Walk-on
- Injured
- Current redshirt

Roster
Last update: February 2, 2024

== Schedule and results ==
Date time, TV	Rank^{#}	Opponent^{#}	Result	Record	High points	High rebounds	High assists	Site (attendance) city, state
Exhibition
November 1, 2023*; 7:00 pm		Malone	W 101–60	–	–	–	–	Wolstein Center; Cleveland, OH
Regular season
November 7, 2023*; 6:00 pm, ESPN+		at Bowling Green	L 86–89	0–1	33 – Leo	7 – Villalobos	3 – Maples	Stroh Center (1,813); Bowling Green, OH
November 12, 2023*; 3:00 pm, ESPN+		at Loyola Chicago	W 74–66	1–1	33 – Leo	7 – Villalobos	2 – 3 Tied	Joseph J. Gentile Arena (406); Chicago, IL
November 18, 2023*; 2:00 pm, ESPN+		Central Michigan	W 96–57	2–1	17 – Leo	12 – Guerreiro	3 – 3 Tied	Wolstein Center (319); Cleveland, OH
November 21, 2023*; 7:00 pm, ESPN+		Austin Peay; Viking Invitational	W 62–57	3–1	22 – Leo	7 – Villalobos	1 – 6 Tied	Woodling Gym (418); Cleveland, OH
November 24, 2023*; 1:00 pm, ESPN+		Chicago State; Viking Invitational	W 95–41	4–1	17 – Leo	12 – Howard	3 – 2 Tied	Woodling Gym (380); Cleveland, OH
November 25, 2023*; 4:00 pm, ESPN+		Kansas City; Viking Invitational	W 82–55	5–1	17 – Maples	10 – Reisma	7 – Maples	Woodling Gym (374); Cleveland, OH
November 29, 2023; 7:00 pm, ESPN+		Robert Morris	W 72–59	6–1 (1–0)	25 – Maples	10 – Villalobos	3 – Thomas	Wolstein Center (247); Cleveland, OH
December 2, 2023; 2:00 pm, ESPN+		at Northern Kentucky	W 72–60	7–1 (2–0)	23 – Maples	8 – Villalobos	4 – Perdue	Truist Arena (985); Highland Heights, KY
December 6, 2023*; 7:00 pm, ESPN+		Niagara	W 87–56	8–1	22 – Guerreiro	8 – 2 Tied	5 – Maples	Wolstein Center (303); Cleveland, OH
December 10, 2023*; 2:00 pm, ESPN+		Akron	W 71–62	9–1	25 – Perdue	9 – Reisma	7 – Maples	Wolstein Center (262); Cleveland, OH
December 16, 2023*; 7:00 pm, B1G		vs. No. 4 Iowa; Hy-Vee Hawkeye Showcase	L 75–104	9–2	24 – Perdue	5 – Villalobos	6 – Maples	Wells Fargo Arena (14,786); Des Moines, IA
December 20, 2023*; 4:30 pm		vs. Southern Miss; Homewood Suites Classic	W 70–63	10–2	24 – Perdue	13 – Burch	7 – Maples	Alico Arena (108); Fort Myers, FL
December 21, 2023*; 3:00 pm		vs. Drexel; Homewood Suites Classic	W 69–59	11–2	20 – Maples	9 – Reisma	4 – Maples	Alico Arena (108); Fort Myers, FL
December 30, 2023; 2:00 pm, ESPN+		at Green Bay	L 72–85	11–3 (2–1)	23 – Perdue	6 – Villalobos	7 – Maples	Kress Events Center (2,421); Green Bay, WI
January 1, 2024; 3:00 pm, ESPN+		at Milwaukee	W 64–59	12–3 (3–1)	24 – Perdue	7 – Villalobos	6 – Maples	Klotsche Center (524); Milwaukee, WI
January 6, 2024; 1:00 pm, ESPN+		Youngstown State	W 79–37	13–3 (4–1)	17 – 2 Tied	11 – Guerreiro	4 – 2 Tied	Wolstein Center (368); Cleveland, OH
January 10, 2024; 7:00 pm, ESPN+		Detroit Mercy	W 74–53	14–3 (5–1)	25 – Perdue	9 – Villalobos	4 – Perdue	Wolstein Center (313); Cleveland, OH
January 13, 2024; 1:00 pm, ESPN+		Purdue Fort Wayne	W 68–56	15–3 (6–1)	29 – Maples	10 – Reisma	7 – Maples	Wolstein Center (260); Cleveland, OH
January 17, 2024; 7:00 pm, ESPN+		at Wright State	W 72–61	16–3 (7–1)	17 – Maples	6 – 2 Tied	4 – Maples	Nutter Center (1,149); Fairborn, OH
January 20, 2024; 5:00 pm, ESPN+		IUPUI	W 90–58	17–3 (8–1)	22 – Perdue	7 – Guerreiro	5 – Maples	Wolstein Center (379); Cleveland, OH
January 25, 2024; 7:00 pm, ESPN+		at Oakland	W 77–65	18–3 (9–1)	24 – Perdue	10 – Villalobos	8 – Villalobos	OU Credit Union O'rena (517); Rochester, MI
January 27, 2024; 1:00 pm, ESPN+		at Detroit Mercy	L 56–69	18–4 (9–2)	24 – Perdue	6 – Reisma	6 – Maples	Calihan Hall (251); Detroit, MI
January 31, 2024; 7:00 pm, ESPN+		at Purdue Fort Wayne	W 70–60	19–4 (10–2)	20 – Perdue	8 – Villalobos	5 – Maples	Hilliard Gates Sports Center (534); Fort Wayne, IN
February 3, 2024; 2:00 pm, ESPN+		Green Bay	W 86–63	20–4 (11–2)	30 – Perdue	8 – 2 Tied	8 – Maples	Wolstein Center (848); Cleveland, OH
February 7, 2024; 7:00 pm, ESPN+		Wright State	W 71–59	21–4 (12–2)	16 – Maples	8 – Guerreiro	6 – Villalobos	Wolstein Center (330); Cleveland, OH
February 15, 2024; 12:00 pm, ESPN+		Oakland	W 78–63	22–4 (13–2)	27 – Perdue	10 – Reisma	5 – Maples	Wolstein Center (3,347); Cleveland, OH
February 17, 2024; 12:00 pm, ESPN+		Milwaukee	W 64–51	23–4 (14–2)	15 – Maples	12 – Guerreiro	6 – Maples	Wolstein Center (621); Cleveland, OH
February 21, 2024; 7:00 pm, ESPN+		at IUPUI	W 75–52	24–4 (15–2)	18 – Reisma	12 – Reisma	6 – Maples	IUPUI Gymnasium (493); Indianapolis, IN
February 24, 2024; 12:00 pm, ESPN+		at Robert Morris	W 79–40	25–4 (16–2)	22 – Maples	7 – 3 Tied	4 – Perdue	UPMC Events Center (357); Moon Township, PA
February 27, 2024; 6:30 pm, ESPN+		at Youngstown State	W 56-53	26-4 (17-2)	18 – Maples	11 – 2 Tied	2 – Burch	Beeghly Center (1,947); Youngstown, OH
March 2, 2024; 2:00 pm, ESPN+		Northern Kentucky	W 81-69	27-4 (18-2)	25 – Perdue	10 – Guerreiro	4 – Guerreiro	Wolstein Center (690); Cleveland, OH
Horizon League tournament
March 7, 2024; 7:00 pm, ESPN+	(1)	(9) Northern Kentucky; Quarterfinals	W 88-78	28-4	31 – Maples	10 – Villalobos	5 – Maples	Wolstein Center (815); Cleveland, OH
March 11, 2024; 12:00 pm, ESPN+	(1)	vs. (4) Wright State; Semifinals	W 83-50	29-4	18 – Perdue	10 – Reisma	6 – Guerreiro	Indiana Farmers Coliseum; Indianapolis, IN
March 12, 2024; 12:00 pm, ESPNU	(1)	vs. (2) Northern Kentucky; Championship	L 40-64	29-5	22 – Maples	5 – 2 Tied	2 – Perdue	Indiana Farmers Coliseum; Indianapolis, IN
WBIT
March 21, 2024*; 7:00 pm, ESPN+		at (2) Toledo; First Round	L 68-76	29–6	31 – Perdue	11 – Burch	4 – 2 Tied	Savage Arena (1,877); Toledo, OH
*Non-conference game. ^{#}Rankings from AP Poll. (#) Tournament seedings in parentheses. All times are in Eastern.
