= 2023–24 IUPUI Jaguars women's basketball team =

American college basketball season

2023–24 IUPUI Jaguars women's basketball
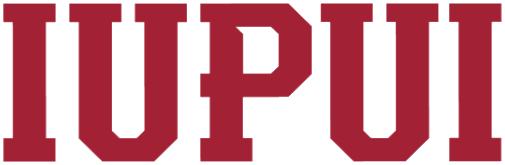
- Conference: Horizon League
- Record: 6–21 (4–14 Horizon)
- Head coach: Kate Bruce (2nd season)
- Assistant coaches: Johnny Montello; Kortney Dunbar; China Dow
- Home arena: IUPUI Gymnasium

2023–24 Horizon League women's basketball standings
	Conf.				Overall
Team	W		L	PCT	W		L	PCT
Cleveland State	18	–	2	.900	29	–	6	.829
Green Bay †	17	–	3	.850	27	–	7	.794
Purdue Fort Wayne	13	–	7	.650	23	–	13	.639
Wright State	11	–	9	.550	18	–	15	.545
Milwaukee	10	–	10	.500	16	–	16	.500
Detroit Mercy	9	–	11	.450	17	–	16	.515
Youngstown State	9	–	11	.450	14	–	18	.438
Oakland	8	–	12	.400	12	–	17	.414
Northern Kentucky	8	–	12	.400	11	–	20	.355
IUPUI	5	–	15	.250	7	–	23	.233
Robert Morris	2	–	18	.100	6	–	24	.200
† 2024 Horizon League tournament winner

The 2023–24 IUPUI Jaguars women's basketball team represented Indiana University–Purdue University Indianapolis during the 2023–24 NCAA Division I women's basketball season. The Jaguars, led by second-year head coach Kate Bruce, played their home games at IUPUI Gymnasium in Indianapolis, Indiana as members of the Horizon League.

This was the final season for IUPUI as an institution. In August 2022, the Indiana University and Purdue University systems announced that they would dissolve IUPUI at the end of the 2023–24 academic year, with the vast majority of academic programs moving to the new Indiana University Indianapolis and a few programs becoming affiliated with Purdue. The athletic program will transfer to the new IU Indianapolis.

== Previous season ==
The Jaguars finished the 2022–23 season 17–13, 13–7 in Horizon League play to finish in a tie for third place. As the #3 seed in the Horizon League tournament, they were upset by #6 seed Purdue Fort Wayne in the quarterfinals.

== Roster ==
2023–24 IUPUI Jaguars women's basketball team
Players
Coaches

Pos.	#	Name	Height	Year	Previous school	Hometown
F	00/0	Faith Stinson	6 ft 2 in (1.88 m)	So	Akron	Thornville, Ohio
G	2	Jaci Jones	5 ft 5 in (1.65 m)	Sr	South Side High School	Fort Wayne, Indiana
F	3	Kace Urlacher	6 ft 1 in (1.85 m)	Fr	Fremd High School	Lake Bluff, Illinois
F	4	Alexa Hocevar	6 ft 1 in (1.85 m)	Fr	West Geauga High School	Willoughby Hills, Ohio
G	5	Jaela Johnson	5 ft 5 in (1.65 m)	GS	Bellarmine	Louisville, Kentucky
G	11	Azyah Newson-Cole	5 ft 7 in (1.7 m)	Fr	Lincoln-Way Central High School	Matteson, Illinois
G/F	12	Katie Davidson	5 ft 10 in (1.78 m)	Jr	Miami (OH)	Indianapolis, Indiana
G	13	Logan Lewis	5 ft 7 in (1.7 m)	Jr	West Bloomfield High School	West Bloomfield, Michigan
F	14	Abby Wolterman	6 ft 0 in (1.83 m)	So	Mount Notre Dame High School	West Chester, Ohio
F	20	Jazmyn Turner	6 ft 2 in (1.88 m)	GS	Ball State	Marion, Indiana
G/F	21	Tahlia Walton	5 ft 11 in (1.8 m)	GS	Kentucky Wesleyan	Stanley, Wisconsin
G	22	Camron Blank	5 ft 9 in (1.75 m)	Jr	Rock Valley College	Rockford, Illinois
G	23	Kaylin Moorehead	5 ft 6 in (1.68 m)	Fr	Westfield Prep	Redford, Michigan
G	24	Brooklyn Stubblefield	5 ft 8 in (1.73 m)	Fr	Greenwood Christian Academy	Franklin, Indiana

Head coach

- Kate Bruce (Florida Gulf Coast)

Assistant coach(es)

- Johnny Montello (Hiram)
- Kortney Dunbar (Tennessee)
- China Dow (Florida Gulf Coast)

Legend

- (C) Team captain
- (S) Suspended
- (I) Ineligible
- (W) Walk-on
- Injured
- Current redshirt

Roster
Last update: February 9, 2024

== Schedule and results ==
Date time, TV	Rank^{#}	Opponent^{#}	Result	Record	High points	High rebounds	High assists	Site (attendance) city, state
Regular season
November 6, 2023*; 7:00 pm, ESPN+		Eastern Illinois	W 77–72	1–0	32 – Davidson	17 – Turner	6 – Turner	IUPUI Gymnasium (501); Indianapolis, IN
November 12, 2023*; 1:00 pm, B1G+		at No. 7 Ohio State	L 58–108	1–1	23 – Davidson	5 – 2 Tied	2 – 4 Tied	Value City Arena (4,933); Columbus, OH
November 15, 2023*; 7:00 pm, ESPN+		Marquette	L 58–92	1–2	14 – Walton	8 – Wolterman	3 – Wolterman	IUPUI Gymnasium (439); Indianapolis, IN
November 19, 2023*; 2:00 pm, ESPN+		at UIC	L 49–79	1–3	12 – Wolterman	7 – Urlacher	3 – 2 Tied	Credit Union 1 Arena (948); Chicago, IL
November 22, 2023*; 2:00 pm, ESPN+		Ball State	L 63–67	1–4	18 – Johnson	6 – Walton	6 – Walton	IUPUI Gymnasium (490); Indianapolis, IN
November 26, 2023*; 1:00 pm, ESPN+		at Ohio	L 71–75	1–5	18 – Walton	7 – Walton	3 – 3 Tied	Convocation Center (490); Athens, OH
November 30, 2023; 7:00 pm, ESPN+		at Wright State	L 67–79	1–6 (0–1)	16 – Davidson	10 – Lewis	6 – Johnson	Nutter Center (1,015); Fairborn, OH
December 3, 2023; 2:00 pm, ESPN+		Milwaukee	L 59–70	1–7 (0–2)	20 – Davidson	6 – Wolterman	4 – 2 Tied	IUPUI Gymnasium (392); Indianapolis, IN
December 6, 2023*; 7:00 pm, ESPN+		at Evansville	W 81–75	2–7	26 – Davidson	12 – Stinson	5 – Stinson	Meeks Family Fieldhouse (375); Evansville, IN
December 15, 2023*; 7:00 pm, ESPN+		Eastern Michigan	L 74–84 ^{OT}	2–8	22 – Davidson	8 – Wolterman	3 – 2 Tied	IUPUI Gymnasium (414); Indianapolis, IN
December 20, 2023*; 1:15 pm, FloHoops		vs. South Florida; West Palm Beach Classic	L 49–85	2–9	19 – Davidson	8 – Turner	2 – Davidson	Massimino Court; West Palm Beach, FL
December 29, 2023; 7:00 pm, ESPN+		at Robert Morris	L 49–60	2–10 (0–3)	8 – 2 Tied	6 – Stinson	3 – Johnson	UPMC Events Center (315); Moon Township, PA
December 31, 2023; 12:00 pm, ESPN+		at Youngstown State	L 56–58	2–11 (0–4)	18 – Walton	12 – Stinson	3 – Jones	Beeghly Center (2,147); Youngstown, OH
January 4, 2024; 7:00 pm, ESPN+		Detroit Mercy	W 81–76 ^{OT}	3–11 (1–4)	30 – Davidson	8 – Turner	4 – 2 Tied	IUPUI Gymnasium (416); Indianapolis, IN
January 11, 2024; 7:00 pm, ESPN+		Wright State	L 64–74	3–12 (1–5)	14 – 2 Tied	11 – Stinson	3 – Johnson	IUPUI Gymnasium (456); Indianapolis, IN
January 14, 2024; 2:00 pm, ESPN+		Northern Kentucky	W 96–81	4–12 (2–5)	27 – Davidson	10 – Turner	7 – Davidson	IUPUI Gymnasium (381); Indianapolis, IN
January 20, 2024; 5:00 pm, ESPN+		at Cleveland State	L 58–90	4–13 (2–6)	17 – Davidson	6 – Turner	4 – 2 Tied	Wolstein Center (379); Cleveland, OH
January 24, 2024; 7:00 pm, ESPN+		Green Bay	L 59–87	4–14 (2–7)	22 – Walton	5 – Stinson	2 – 3 Tied	IUPUI Gymnasium (471); Indianapolis, IN
January 28, 2024; 4:00 pm, ESPN+		Oakland	L 59–65	4–15 (2–8)	18 – Davidson	10 – Wolterman	3 – Jones	IUPUI Gymnasium (374); Indianapolis, IN
January 31, 2024; 11:00 am, ESPN+		Youngstown State	W 69–63	5–15 (3–8)	20 – Davidson	8 – Turner	2 – 3 Tied	IUPUI Gymnasium (349); Indianapolis, IN
February 3, 2024; 3:00 pm, ESPN+		at Purdue Fort Wayne	L 65–68	5–16 (3–9)	17 – Davidson	9 – Wolterman	3 – 2 Tied	Hilliard Gates Sports Center (1,004); Fort Wayne, IN
February 8, 2024; 8:00 pm, ESPN+		at Milwaukee	L 54–73	5–17 (3–10)	20 – Turner	7 – Davidson	3 – 2 Tied	Klotsche Center (606); Milwaukee, WI
February 10, 2024; 2:00 pm, ESPN+		at Green Bay	L 52–71	5–18 (3–11)	18 – Davidson	7 – Wolterman	5 – Johnson	Kress Events Center (2,115); Green Bay, WI
February 14, 2024; 7:00 pm, ESPN+		at Northern Kentucky	L 88–100	5–19 (3–12)	22 – Turner	5 – 3 Tied	4 – Jones	Truist Arena (925); Highland Heights, KY
February 18, 2024; 2:00 pm, ESPN+		Robert Morris	W 70–50	6–19 (4–12)	17 – Stinson	10 – Turner	7 – Johnson	IUPUI Gymnasium (391); Indianapolis, IN
February 21, 2024; 7:00 pm, ESPN+		Cleveland State	L 52–75	6–20 (4–13)	14 – Stinson	5 – Stinson	3 – 2 Tied	IUPUI Gymnasium (493); Indianapolis, IN
February 24, 2024; 2:00 pm, ESPN+		Purdue Fort Wayne	L 55–68	6–21 (4–14)	21 – Davidson	8 – 2 Tied	4 – Hocevar	IUPUI Gymnasium (548); Indianapolis, IN
February 29, 2024; 7:00 pm, ESPN+		at Detroit Mercy	L 59-64	6-22 (4-15)	13 – Turner	7 – Turner	2 – 4 Tied	Calihan Hall (378); Detroit, MI
March 2, 2024; 2:00 pm, ESPN+		at Oakland	W 92-71	7-22 (5-15)	23 – Turner	6 – 2 Tied	5 – Johnson	OU Credit Union O'rena (403); Rochester, MI
Horizon League tournament
March 5, 2024; 7:00 pm, ESPN+	(10)	at (7) Youngstown State; First Round	L 50-73	7-23	17 – Turner	9 – Turner	3 – 2 Tied	Beeghly Center (929); Youngstown, OH
*Non-conference game. ^{#}Rankings from AP Poll. (#) Tournament seedings in parentheses. All times are in Eastern.
