= 2023–24 Purdue Fort Wayne Mastodons women's basketball team =

American college basketball season

2023–24 Purdue Fort Wayne Mastodons women's basketball

WNIT, Super 16
- Conference: Horizon League
- Record: 23–13 (13–7 Horizon)
- Head coach: Maria Marchesano (3rd season)
- Assistant coaches: Steven Asher; Jasmyn Walker; Jazmyne Geist; Quincy Cunningham
- Home arena: Hilliard Gates Sports Center

2023–24 Horizon League women's basketball standings
	Conf.				Overall
Team	W		L	PCT	W		L	PCT
Cleveland State	18	–	2	.900	29	–	6	.829
Green Bay †	17	–	3	.850	27	–	7	.794
Purdue Fort Wayne	13	–	7	.650	23	–	13	.639
Wright State	11	–	9	.550	18	–	15	.545
Milwaukee	10	–	10	.500	16	–	16	.500
Detroit Mercy	9	–	11	.450	17	–	16	.515
Youngstown State	9	–	11	.450	14	–	18	.438
Oakland	8	–	12	.400	12	–	17	.414
Northern Kentucky	8	–	12	.400	11	–	20	.355
IUPUI	5	–	15	.250	7	–	23	.233
Robert Morris	2	–	18	.100	6	–	24	.200
† 2024 Horizon League tournament winner

The 2023–24 Purdue Fort Wayne Mastodons women's basketball team represented Purdue University Fort Wayne during the 2023–24 NCAA Division I women's basketball season. The Mastodons, led by third-year head coach Maria Marchesano, played their home games at the Hilliard Gates Sports Center in Fort Wayne, Indiana, as members of the Horizon League. Freshman Konstantina Mantziori from Athens, Greece made history, becoming the first Greek born player in program history.

== Previous season ==
The Mastodons finished the 2022–23 season 14–19, 9–11 in Horizon League play, to finish in sixth place. As the #6 seed in the Horizon League tournament, they defeated #11 seed Detroit Mercy in the first round, and upset #3 seed IUPUI in the quarterfinals, before falling to top-seeded Green Bay in the semifinals.

== Roster ==
2023–24 Purdue Fort Wayne Mastodons women's basketball team
Players
Coaches

Pos.	#	Name	Height	Year	Previous school	Hometown
G	0	Klea Kaci	5 ft 11 in (1.8 m)	RS Fr	Turner Fenton Secondary School	Mississauga, ON
G/F	1	Shayla Sellers	6 ft 0 in (1.83 m)	GS	Aurora High School	Aurora, OH
G	3	Lauryn Stover	5 ft 10 in (1.78 m)	So	Gilmour Academy	Solon, OH
G	4	Ryin Ott	5 ft 10 in (1.78 m)	Jr	LaPorte High School	La Porte, IN
G	5	Audra Emmerson	5 ft 7 in (1.7 m)	Jr	Fishers High School	Fishers, IN
G	10	Konstantina Mantziori	5 ft 5 in (1.65 m)	Fr	Cardinal Gibbons High School	Athens, Greece
G	12	Destinee Marshall	5 ft 5 in (1.65 m)	Sr	Radford	Louisville, KY
G	13	Amellia Bromenschenkel	5 ft 11 in (1.8 m)	Sr	Mendota Township High School	Mendota, IL
G	14	Erin Woodson	6 ft 0 in (1.83 m)	Fr	Saint Gertrude High School	Richmond, VA
F	21	Jazzlyn Linbo	6 ft 2 in (1.88 m)	Jr	Grant Community High School	Round Lake, IL
F	30	Renna Schwieterman	6 ft 0 in (1.83 m)	Fr	Jay County High School	Portland, IN
F	32	Sydney Graber	6 ft 1 in (1.85 m)	Sr	Central Michigan	Fort Wayne, IN

Head coach

- Maria Marchesano (Butler)

Assistant coach(es)

- Steven Asher (James Madison)
- Jasmyn Walker (Western Michigan)
- Jazmyne Geist (Northern Kentucky)
- Quincy Cunningham (Purdue Fort Wayne)

Legend

- (C) Team captain
- (S) Suspended
- (I) Ineligible
- (W) Walk-on
- Injured
- Current redshirt

Roster
Last update: February 6, 2024

== Schedule and results ==
Date time, TV	Rank^{#}	Opponent^{#}	Result	Record	High points	High rebounds	High assists	Site (attendance) city, state
Regular season
November 6, 2023*; 7:00 pm, B1G+		at Michigan	L 61–80	0–1	14 – Sellers	6 – Bromenschenkel	4 – Bromenschenkel	Crisler Center (2,389); Ann Arbor, MI
November 11, 2023*; 1:00 pm, ESPN+		Great Lakes Christian	W 124–41	1–1	28 – Schwieterman	12 – Linbo	5 – Mantziori	Hilliard Gates Sports Center (501); Fort Wayne, IN
November 15, 2023*; 7:00 pm, ESPN+		at Southern Illinois	W 70–64 ^{OT}	2–1	20 – Sellers	6 – Bromenschenkel	4 – Emmerson	Banterra Center (600); Carbondale, IL
November 24, 2023*; 7:30 pm, FloHoops		vs. No. 5 Iowa; Gulf Coast Showcase first round	L 59–98	2–2	16 – Bromenschenkel	6 – Bromenschenkel	2 – 3 tied	Hertz Arena (3,313); Estero, FL
November 25, 2023*; 1:30 pm, FloHoops		vs. Delaware; Gulf Coast Showcase consolation second round	W 88–74	3–2	27 – Bromenschenkel	5 – Graber	3 – 2 tied	Hertz Arena (356); Estero, FL
November 26, 2023*; 1:30 pm, FloHoops		vs. Western Kentucky; Gulf Coast Showcase fifth-place game	W 90–77	4–2	21 – Emmerson	9 – Emmerson	6 – 2 tied	Hertz Arena (213); Estero, FL
November 30, 2023; 7:00 pm, ESPN+		at Oakland	W 84–66	5–2 (1–0)	21 – Ott	9 – Bromenschenkel	5 – 2 tied	OU Credit Union O'rena (439); Rochester, MI
December 3, 2023; 2:00 pm, ESPN+		Wright State	W 71–60	6–2 (2–0)	14 – Schwieterman	8 – Bromenschenkel	3 – Marshall	Hilliard Gates Sports Center (543); Fort Wayne, IN
December 6, 2023*; 6:30 pm, ESPN+		at Bellarmine	W 57–46	7–2	17 – Ott	10 – Bromenschenkel	2 – Marshall	Freedom Hall (400); Louisville, KY
December 9, 2023*; 4:00 pm, ESPN+		St. Thomas	L 59–64	7–3	15 – 2 tied	7 – Ott	2 – 3 tied	War Memorial Coliseum (1,838); Fort Wayne, IN
December 17, 2023*; 2:00 pm, ESPN+		at Western Michigan	L 76–78	7–4	21 – Bromenschenkel	9 – Graber	3 – Bromenschenkel	University Arena (826); Kalamazoo, MI
December 21, 2023*; 11:00 am, ESPN+		Aquinas	W 77–43	8–4	16 – Bromenschenkel	10 – Sellers	3 – 3 tied	Hilliard Gates Sports Center (949); Fort Wayne, IN
December 30, 2023; 3:00 pm, ESPN+		at Milwaukee	W 65–55	9–4 (3–0)	14 – Bromenschenkel	9 – Bromenschenkel	5 – Bromenschenkel	Klotsche Center (722); Milwaukee, WI
January 1, 2024; 2:00 pm, ESPN+		at Green Bay	L 46–72	9–5 (3–1)	12 – Schwieterman	6 – Bromenschenkel	3 – 2 tied	Kress Events Center (1,704); Green Bay, WI
January 4, 2024; 7:00 pm, ESPN+		Robert Morris	W 68–56	10–5 (4–1)	15 – Marshall	6 – Linbo	6 – Marshall	Hilliard Gates Sports Center (513); Fort Wayne, IN
January 7, 2024; 1:00 pm, ESPN+		at Detroit Mercy	L 56–60	10–6 (4–2)	13 – Marshall	8 – Linbo	3 – Marshall	Calihan Hall (279); Detroit, MI
January 10, 2024; 7:00 pm, ESPN+		Oakland	W 79–59	11–6 (5–2)	19 – Bromenschenkel	7 – Emmerson	3 – Linbo	Hilliard Gates Sports Center (304); Fort Wayne, IN
January 13, 2024; 1:00 pm, ESPN+		at Cleveland State	L 56–68	11–7 (5–3)	20 – Linbo	12 – Linbo	3 – 2 tied	Wolstein Center (260); Cleveland, OH
January 18, 2024; 6:30 pm, ESPN+		at Youngstown State	L 57–66	11–8 (5–4)	15 – Emmerson	6 – Bromenschenkel	5 – Marshall	Beeghly Center (1,726); Youngstown, OH
January 20, 2024; 12:00 pm, ESPN+		at Robert Morris	W 64–36	12–8 (6–4)	18 – Emmerson	9 – Linbo	6 – Bromenschenkel	UPMC Events Center (224); Moon Township, PA
January 23, 2024*; 8:00 pm, YouTube		at Chicago State	W 102–76	13–8	22 – Emmerson	5 – 3 tied	4 – 2 tied	Jones Convocation Center (154); Chicago, IL
January 27, 2024; 2:00 pm, ESPN+		Northern Kentucky	W 61–55	14–8 (7–4)	20 – Sellers	12 – Bromenschenkel	2 – Emmerson	Hilliard Gates Sports Center (743); Fort Wayne, IN
January 31, 2024; 7:00 pm, ESPN+		Cleveland State	L 60–70	14–9 (7–5)	11 – Schwieterman	7 – Linbo	4 – Sellers	Hilliard Gates Sports Center (534); Fort Wayne, IN
February 3, 2024; 3:00 pm, ESPN+		IUPUI	W 68–65	15–9 (8–5)	16 – Bromenschenkel	6 – Bromenschenkel	2 – 4 tied	Hilliard Gates Sports Center (1,004); Fort Wayne, IN
February 10, 2024; 4:00 pm, ESPN+		at Wright State	L 66–70	15–10 (8–6)	23 – Sellers	9 – 2 tied	2 – 3 tied	Nutter Center (1,273); Fairborn, OH
February 15, 2024; 7:00 pm, ESPN+		Milwaukee	W 75–55	16–10 (9–6)	21 – Sellers	6 – Schwieterman	6 – Marshall	Hilliard Gates Sports Center (505); Fort Wayne, IN
February 18, 2024; 2:00 pm, ESPN+		Detroit Mercy	W 77–67	17–10 (10–6)	16 – Bromenschenkel	6 – 2 tied	4 – Marshall	Hilliard Gates Sports Center (729); Fort Wayne, IN
February 21, 2024; 7:00 pm, ESPN+		at Northern Kentucky	W 70–58	18–10 (11–6)	17 – Bromenschenkel	8 – Bromenschenkel	3 – Marshall	Truist Arena (841); Highland Heights, KY
February 24, 2024; 2:00 pm, ESPN+		at IUPUI	W 68–55	19–10 (12–6)	17 – Bromenschenkel	8 – Sellers	5 – Marshall	IUPUI Gymnasium (548); Indianapolis, IN
February 28, 2024; 7:00 pm, ESPN+		Green Bay	L 61–70	19–11 (12–7)	16 – Schwieterman	6 – 3 tied	3 – Marshall	Hilliard Gates Sports Center (589); Fort Wayne, IN
March 2, 2024; 3:00 pm, ESPN+		Youngstown State	W 73–64	20–11 (13–7)	22 – Marshall	7 – Sellers	5 – Marshall	Hilliard Gates Sports Center (820); Fort Wayne, IN
Horizon League tournament
March 7, 2024; 7:00 pm, ESPN+	(3)	(6) Detroit Mercy; Quarterfinals	W 66–35	21–11	14 – Emmerson	6 – Bromenschenkel	5 – Marshall	Hilliard Gates Sports Center (667); Fort Wayne, IN
March 7, 2024; 2:30 pm, ESPN+	(3)	vs. (2) Green Bay; Semifinals	L 55–64	21–12	14 – 2 tied	7 – Bromenschenkel	9 – Marshall	Indiana Farmers Coliseum; Indianapolis, IN
WNIT
March 20, 2024*; 7:00 pm		Eastern Kentucky; First round	W 83–75	22–12	22 – Bromenschenkel	4 – 4 tied	2 – 2 tied	Hilliard Gates Sports Center (559); Fort Wayne, IN
March 24, 2024*; 2:00 pm, ESPN+		at Cincinnati; Second round	W 84–58	23–12	22 – Sellers	7 – 2 tied	5 – Linbo	Fifth Third Arena (857); Cincinnati, OH
March 29, 2024*; 7:00 pm, ESPN+		Saint Louis; Super 16	L 78–82	23–13	27 – Bromenschenkel	14 – Bromenschenkel	4 – Marshall	Hilliard Gates Sports Center (767); Fort Wayne, IN
*Non-conference game. ^{#}Rankings from AP poll. (#) Tournament seedings in parentheses. All times are in Eastern.
