= 2023–24 Northern Kentucky Norse women's basketball team =

American college basketball season

2023–24 Northern Kentucky Norse women's basketball
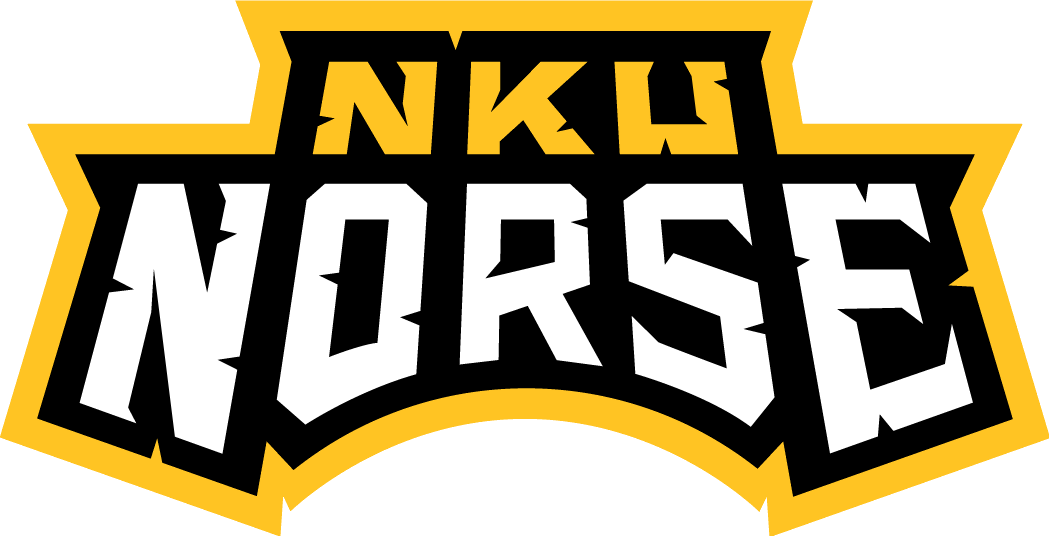
- Conference: Horizon League
- Record: 9–18 (7–11 Horizon)
- Head coach: Camryn Volz (8th season)
- Assistant coaches: Doug Novak; John McCray; Mallory Odell
- Home arena: Truist Arena

2023–24 Horizon League women's basketball standings
| | Conf. | | | | Overall |
| Team | W | | L | PCT | W | | L | PCT |
|---|---|---|---|---|---|---|---|---|
| Cleveland State | 18 | – | 2 | .900 | 29 | – | 6 | .829 |
| Green Bay † | 17 | – | 3 | .850 | 27 | – | 7 | .794 |
| Purdue Fort Wayne | 13 | – | 7 | .650 | 23 | – | 13 | .639 |
| Wright State | 11 | – | 9 | .550 | 18 | – | 15 | .545 |
| Milwaukee | 10 | – | 10 | .500 | 16 | – | 16 | .500 |
| Detroit Mercy | 9 | – | 11 | .450 | 17 | – | 16 | .515 |
| Youngstown State | 9 | – | 11 | .450 | 14 | – | 18 | .438 |
| Oakland | 8 | – | 12 | .400 | 12 | – | 17 | .414 |
| Northern Kentucky | 8 | – | 12 | .400 | 11 | – | 20 | .355 |
| IUPUI | 5 | – | 15 | .250 | 7 | – | 23 | .233 |
| Robert Morris | 2 | – | 18 | .100 | 6 | – | 24 | .200 |
† 2024 Horizon League tournament winner

The 2023–24 Northern Kentucky Norse women's basketball team represented Northern Kentucky University during the 2023–24 NCAA Division I women's basketball season. The Norse, led by eighth-year head coach Camryn Volz, played their home games at Truist Arena in Highland Heights, Kentucky as members of the Horizon League.

The Norse finished the season 11–20, 8–12 in Horizon League play, to finish in a tie for eighth place. They defeated Oakland before falling to top-seeded Cleveland State in the quarterfinals of the Horizon League tournament.

== Previous season ==
The Norse finished the 2022–23 season 17–14, 10–10 in Horizon League play, to finish in fifth place. In the Horizon League tournament, they defeated Youngstown State in the quarterfinals, before falling to eventual tournament champions Cleveland State in the semifinals.

== Roster ==
2023–24 Northern Kentucky Norse women's basketball team
Players
Coaches

| Pos. | # | Name | Height | Year | Previous school | Hometown |
|---|---|---|---|---|---|---|
| G | 1 | Allison Basye | 5 ft 11 in (1.8 m) | So | Huntington High School | Chillicothe, OH |
| G | 2 | Kalissa Lacy | 5 ft 9 in (1.75 m) | Jr | Eastern Kentucky | Charleston, WV |
| G | 3 | Kailee Davis | 5 ft 2 in (1.57 m) | Jr | Renaissance High School | Detroit, MI |
| F | 4 | Paige Hodgson | 6 ft 4 in (1.93 m) | Jr | Beaver Dam High School | Beaver Dam, WI |
| C | 5/10 | Carter McCray | 6 ft 1 in (1.85 m) | Fr | Elyria Catholic High School | Oberlin, OH |
| G | 5/32 | Mya Meredith | 5 ft 11 in (1.8 m) | Jr | Western Kentucky | Newport, KY |
| G | 11 | Khamari Mitchell-Steen | 5 ft 7 in (1.7 m) | Jr | Oak Ridge High School | Oak Ridge, TN |
| G | 14 | Kennedy Igo | 5 ft 7 in (1.7 m) | Sr | George Rogers Clark High School | Mount Sterling, KY |
| G | 20 | Macey Blevins | 5 ft 10 in (1.78 m) | Jr | Western Kentucky | Monticello, KY |
| G | 22 | Noelle Hubert | 5 ft 11 in (1.8 m) | Fr | Notre Dame Academy | Burlington, KY |
| G | 24 | Madison French | 5 ft 11 in (1.8 m) | Fr | Lakota East High School | Liberty Township, OH |
| F | 33 | Gabby Razzano | 6 ft 2 in (1.88 m) | Fr | Mason High School | Mason, OH |

Head coach

- Camryn Volz (Western Kentucky)

Assistant coach(es)

- Doug Novak (Tennessee)
- John McCray (Ohio State)
- Mallory Odell (Valdosta State)

Legend

- (C) Team captain
- (S) Suspended
- (I) Ineligible
- (W) Walk-on
- Injured
- Current redshirt

Roster
Last update: February 8, 2024

== Schedule and results ==
| Date time, TV | Rank^{#} | Opponent^{#} | Result | Record | High points | High rebounds | High assists | Site (attendance) city, state |
Exhibition
| November 2, 2023*; 7:00 p.m. | | Cedarville | W 80–55 | – | – | – | – | Truist Arena; Highland Heights, KY |
Regular season
| November 6, 2023*; 7:00 p.m., ESPN+ | | Indiana State | L 82–85 ^{OT} | 0–1 | 19 – Igo | 10 – McCray | 5 – Blevins | Truist Arena (945); Highland Heights, KY |
| November 11, 2023*; 2:00 p.m., ESPN+ | | at Eastern Kentucky | L 75–86 | 0–2 | 22 – Mitchell-Steen | 9 – Mitchell-Steen | 4 – 2 tied | Baptist Health Arena; Richmond, KY |
| November 18, 2023*; 2:00 p.m., ESPN+ | | Marshall | W 76–66 | 1–2 | 25 – McCray | 21 – McCray | 9 – Mitchell-Steen | Truist Arena (1,194); Highland Heights, KY |
| November 24, 2023*; 3:30 p.m., FloHoops | | vs. Pittsburgh; Daytona Beach Classic | L 57–88 | 1–3 | 13 – 2 tied | 8 – Blevins | 3 – Blevins | Ocean Center (200); Daytona Beach, FL |
| November 25, 2023*; 8:00 p.m., FloHoops | | vs. Chattanooga; Daytona Beach Classic | L 47–63 | 1–4 | 15 – Basye | 9 – McCray | 2 – McCray | Ocean Center (150); Daytona Beach, FL |
| December 2, 2023; 2:00 p.m., ESPN+ | | Cleveland State | L 60–72 | 1–5 (0–1) | 18 – Basye | 4 – 3 tied | 8 – Blevins | Truist Arena (985); Highland Heights, KY |
| December 6, 2023*; 7:00 p.m., B1G+ | | at Illinois | L 52–74 | 1–6 | 24 – Blevins | 10 – McCray | 1 – 4 tied | State Farm Center (2,869); Champaign, IL |
| December 9, 2023*; 4:30 p.m., ESPN+ | | Kentucky State | W 74–70 | 2–6 | 17 – 3 tied | 10 – Mitchell-Steen | 3 – 2 tied | Truist Arena (890); Highland Heights, KY |
| December 18, 2023*; 7:00 p.m., ESPN+ | | at Tennessee Tech | L 59–77 | 2–7 | 23 – Mitchell-Steen | 10 – McCray | 4 – Mitchell-Steen | Eblen Center (696); Cookeville, TN |
| December 20, 2023*; 7:30 p.m., ESPN+ | | at Middle Tennessee | L 42–83 | 2–8 | 13 – Lacy | 11 – McCray | 2 – 4 tied | Murphy Center (3,314); Murfreesboro, TN |
| December 29, 2023; 7:00 p.m., ESPN+ | | at Oakland | L 79–89 | 2–9 (0–2) | 17 – Davis | 8 – McCray | 5 – Mitchell-Steen | OU Credit Union O'rena (715); Rochester, MI |
| January 1, 2024; 1:00 p.m., ESPN+ | | at Detroit Mercy | L 55–67 | 2–10 (0–3) | 16 – Davis | 14 – McCray | 2 – Blevins | Calihan Hall (313); Detroit, MI |
| January 5, 2024; 7:00 p.m., ESPN+ | | Green Bay | L 56–86 | 2–11 (0–4) | 15 – 2 tied | 8 – McCray | 4 – Davis | Truist Arena (1,094); Highland Heights, KY |
| January 7, 2024; 2:00 p.m., ESPN+ | | Milwaukee | L 67–75 | 2–12 (0–5) | 16 – Davis | 9 – McCray | 5 – Davis | Truist Arena (1,031); Highland Heights, KY |
| January 14, 2024; 2:00 p.m., ESPN+ | | at IUPUI | L 81–96 | 2–13 (0–6) | 25 – McCray | 13 – McCray | 8 – Davis | IUPUI Gymnasium (381); Indianapolis, IN |
| January 17, 2024; 7:00 p.m., ESPN+ | | Robert Morris | W 83–51 | 3–13 (1–6) | 17 – Blevins | 12 – McCray | 6 – Davis | Truist Arena (922); Highland Heights, KY |
| January 20, 2024; 4:00 p.m., BSOH/ESPN+ | | Wright State | L 83–90 | 3–14 (1–7) | 25 – McCray | 11 – McCray | 3 – McCray | Truist Arena (1,342); Highland Heights, KY |
| January 24, 2024; 6:30 p.m., ESPN+ | | at Youngstown State | W 62–56 | 4–14 (2–7) | 20 – Blevins | 12 – McCray | 5 – McCray | Beeghly Center (1,304); Youngstown, OH |
| January 27, 2024; 2:00 p.m., ESPN+ | | at Purdue Fort Wayne | L 55–61 | 4–15 (2–8) | 15 – McCray | 20 – McCray | 3 – McCray | Hilliard Gates Sports Center (743); Fort Wayne, IN |
| January 31, 2024; 11:00 a.m., ESPN+ | | Detroit Mercy | W 73–54 | 5–15 (3–8) | 29 – Mitchell-Steen | 14 – McCray | 4 – 2 tied | Truist Arena (4,122); Highland Heights, KY |
| February 2, 2024; 7:00 p.m., ESPN+ | | Oakland | W 90–82 | 6–15 (4–8) | 30 – Blevins | 12 – McCray | 4 – 3 tied | Truist Arena (1,259); Highland Heights, KY |
| February 8, 2024; 8:00 p.m., ESPN+ | | at Green Bay | L 51–67 | 6–16 (4–9) | 14 – Blevins | 10 – Mitchell-Steen | 4 – Mitchell-Steen | Kress Events Center (1,862); Green Bay, WI |
| February 10, 2024; 3:00 p.m., ESPN+ | | at Milwaukee | W 67–66 | 7–16 (5–9) | 18 – Hubert | 10 – McCray | 4 – Mitchell-Steen | Klotsche Center (652); Milwaukee, WI |
| February 14, 2024; 7:00 p.m., ESPN+ | | IUPUI | W 100–88 | 8–16 (6–9) | 25 – 2 tied | 11 – McCray | 5 – Mitchell-Steen | Truist Arena (925); Highland Heights, KY |
| February 17, 2024; 4:00 p.m., ESPN+ | | at Wright State | W 77–63 | 9–16 (7–9) | 30 – Mitchell-Steen | 10 – McCray | 4 – 3 tied | Nutter Center (1,230); Fairborn, OH |
| February 21, 2024; 7:00 p.m., ESPN+ | | Purdue Fort Wayne | L 58–70 | 9–17 (7–10) | 13 – Blevins | 12 – McCray | 5 – Mitchell-Steen | Truist Arena (841); Highland Heights, KY |
| February 24, 2024; 2:00 p.m., ESPN+ | | Youngstown State | L 64–68 | 9–18 (7–11) | 21 – Blevins | 15 – McCray | 4 – 2 tied | Truist Arena (1,132); Highland Heights, KY |
| February 27, 2024; 7:00 p.m., ESPN+ | | at Robert Morris | W 76–52 | 10–18 (8–11) | 31 – Blevins | 12 – McCray | 5 – Mitchell-Steen | UPMC Events Center (252); Moon Township, PA |
| March 2, 2024; 2:00 p.m., ESPN+ | | at Cleveland State | L 69–81 | 10–19 (8–12) | 27 – McCray | 7 – 2 tied | 4 – Blevins | Wolstein Center (690); Cleveland, OH |
Horizon League tournament
| March 5, 2024; 7:00 p.m., ESPN+ | (9) | at (8) Oakland; First round | W 70–62 | 11–19 | 24 – McCray | 19 – McCray | 5 – Davis | OU Credit Union O'rena (322); Rochester, MI |
| March 7, 2024; 7:00 p.m., ESPN+ | (9) | at (1) Cleveland State; Quarterfinals | L 78–88 | 11–20 | 29 – McCray | 14 – McCray | 5 – Blevins | Wolstein Center (815); Cleveland, OH |
*Non-conference game. ^{#}Rankings from AP poll. (#) Tournament seedings in parentheses. All times are in Eastern.
