= 2024 Horizon League women's basketball tournament =

American college basketball postseason tournament

- Classification: Division I
- Season: 2023–24
- Teams: 11
- Site: Campus sites (First Round and Quarterfinals); Indiana Farmers Coliseum; Indianapolis, Indiana (Semifinals and Finals)
- Champions: Green Bay (17th title)
- Winning coach: Kevin Borseth (13th title)
- MVP: Natalie McNeal (Green Bay)
- Television: ESPN+, ESPNU

2023–24 Horizon League women's basketball standings
	Conf.				Overall
Team	W		L	PCT	W		L	PCT
Cleveland State	18	–	2	.900	29	–	6	.829
Green Bay †	17	–	3	.850	27	–	7	.794
Purdue Fort Wayne	13	–	7	.650	23	–	13	.639
Wright State	11	–	9	.550	18	–	15	.545
Milwaukee	10	–	10	.500	16	–	16	.500
Detroit Mercy	9	–	11	.450	17	–	16	.515
Youngstown State	9	–	11	.450	14	–	18	.438
Oakland	8	–	12	.400	12	–	17	.414
Northern Kentucky	8	–	12	.400	11	–	20	.355
IUPUI	5	–	15	.250	7	–	23	.233
Robert Morris	2	–	18	.100	6	–	24	.200
† 2024 Horizon League tournament winner

The 2024 Horizon League Women's Basketball Tournament was the final event of the 2023–24 women's basketball season for the Horizon League. It was held from March 5–12, 2024; first-round and quarterfinal games will be played at the home courts of the higher seeds, with all remaining games at Indiana Farmers Coliseum in Indianapolis. The winner will receive the conference's automatic berth into the NCAA Tournament. The tournament was sponsored by Barbasol.

== Seeds ==
All of the teams participated in the tournament with the top-five teams receiving byes to the quarterfinals.

Seed	School	Conf	Tiebreaker
1	Cleveland State	18−2	
2	Green Bay	17−3	
3	Purdue Fort Wayne	13−7	
4	Wright State	11−9	
5	Milwaukee	10−10	
6	Detroit Mercy	9−11	1-1 vs. Youngstown State/1–1 vs. Cleveland State
7	Youngstown State	9−11	1-1 vs. Detroit Mercy/0–2 vs. Cleveland State
8	Oakland	8−12	1-1 vs. Northern Kentucky/1–1 vs. Green Bay
9	Northern Kentucky	8−12	1-1 vs. Oakland/0–2 vs. Green Bay
10	IUPUI	5−15	
11	Robert Morris	2−18	

== Schedule ==
Game	Time	Matchup	Score	Television
First Round – Tuesday, March 5
1	7:00 pm	No. 11 Robert Morris at No. 6 Detroit Mercy	48–59	ESPN+
2	7:00 pm	No. 10 IUPUI at No. 7 Youngstown State	50–73	ESPN+
3	7:00 pm	No. 9 Northern Kentucky at No. 8 Oakland	70–62	ESPN+
Quarterfinals – Thursday, March 7
4	7:00 pm	No. 9 Northern Kentucky at No. 1 Cleveland State	78–88	ESPN+
5	6:30 pm	No. 7 Youngstown State at No. 2 Green Bay	57–94	ESPN+
6	7:00 pm	No. 6 Detroit Mercy at No. 3 Purdue Fort Wayne	35–66	ESPN+
7	5:30 pm	No. 5 Milwaukee at No. 4 Wright State	60–70	ESPN+
Semifinals – Monday, March 11 at Indiana Farmers Coliseum, Indianapolis, IN
8	12:00 pm	No. 4 Wright State vs. No. 1 Cleveland State	50–83	ESPN+
9	2:30 pm	No. 3 Purdue Fort Wayne vs. No. 2 Green Bay	55–64	ESPN+
Championship – Tuesday, March 12 at Indiana Farmers Coliseum, Indianapolis, IN
10	12:00 pm	No. 1 Cleveland State vs. No. 2 Green Bay	40–64	ESPNU/ESPN+
All game times are Eastern. Rankings denote tournament seed

== Bracket ==
The Horizon League does not use a fixed bracket tournament system, and pairings are re-seeded after the first and second rounds.

First round Tuesday, March 5
8	Oakland	62
9	Northern Kentucky	70
7	Youngstown State	73
10	IUPUI	50
6	Detroit Mercy	59
11	Robert Morris	48

Quarterfinals; Thursday, March 7
1	Cleveland State	88
9	Northern Kentucky	78
4	Wright State	70
5	Milwaukee	60
2	Green Bay	94
7	Youngstown State	67
3	Purdue Fort Wayne	66
6	Detroit Mercy	35

Semifinals; Monday, March 11
1	Cleveland State	83
4	Wright State	50
2	Green Bay	64
3	Purdue Fort Wayne	55

Championship; Tuesday, March 12
1	Cleveland State	40
2	Green Bay	64
