= Klotsche Center =

Arena in Milwaukee, Wisconsin

J. Martin Klotsche Center
- Klotsche Center
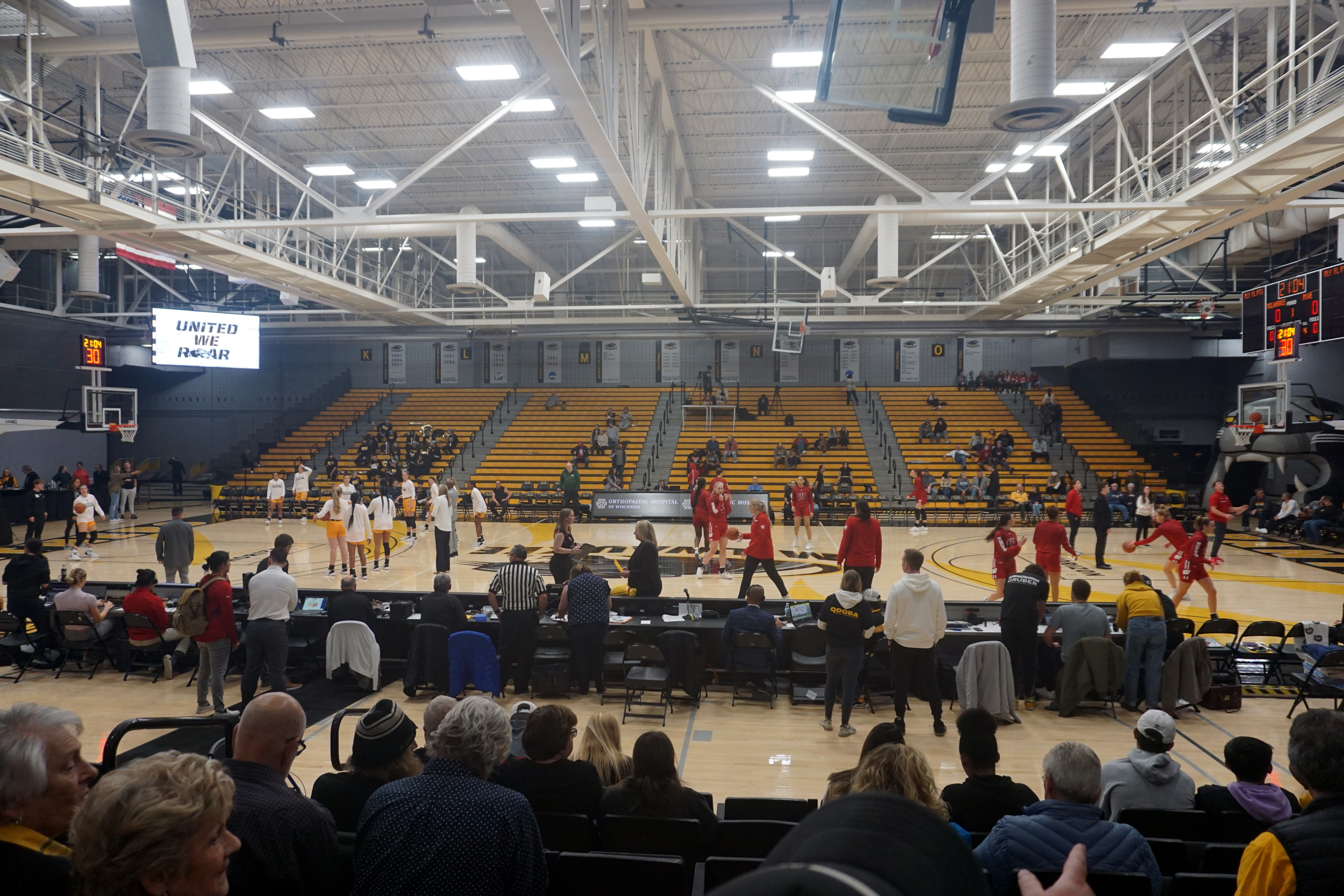
- Interactive map of J. Martin Klotsche Center
- Former names: J. Martin Klotsche Center
- Location: 3409 N. Downer Ave. Milwaukee, WI 53233
- Coordinates: 43.079414°N 87.879783°W
- Owner: University of Wisconsin–Milwaukee
- Operator: University of Wisconsin–Milwaukee
- Capacity: 3,500
- Public transit: MCTS

Construction
- Groundbreaking: 1975
- Opened: 1977
- Cost: $5.458 million
- Architect: Schuett Erdmann Associates / Architects III Inc.

Tenants
- Milwaukee Panthers men's basketball (1977–1992, 1998–2003, 2012–2013); Milwaukee Panthers women's basketball Milwaukee Panthers volleyball

The Klotsche Center (formally the J. Martin Klotsche Center) is a 3,500-seat multi-purpose arena in Milwaukee, Wisconsin on the campus of the University of Wisconsin–Milwaukee (UWM). Opened in 1977, the arena was named after UWM's first Chancellor, J. Martin Klotsche. It is home to the Milwaukee Panthers women's basketball and volleyball teams. It is part of UWM's Pavilion complex and is used heavily as a practice facility for many teams.

In June 2012, UWM announced that it would be moving its men's basketball games from U.S. Cellular Arena back to the Klotsche Center for the 2012-2013 season; the team played at the Klotsche Center from 1977 to 1992 and again from 1998 to 2003. To make Klotsche more suitable for Division I basketball, new scoreboards, video boards, and new padded courtside seats were installed. After just one season, UWM and the Wisconsin Center District announced that men's basketball would be returning to U.S. Cellular Arena.
