= The Jungle (Indianapolis) =

Arena in Indianapolis, Indiana

IU Indy Gymnasium
- The Jungle
- Interactive map of IU Indy Gymnasium
- Location: 901 West New York Street, Indianapolis, Indiana 46202
- Coordinates: 39°46′14″N 86°10′30″W
- Owner: Indiana University Indianapolis
- Operator: Indiana University Indianapolis
- Capacity: 1,215 (basketball/volleyball)
- Surface: Hardwood

Construction
- Opened: 1982

Tenants
- IUPUI / IU Indy Jaguars (NCAA); Men's basketball (1982–2014); Women's basketball (1982–present)

The Jungle, formerly known as the IUPUI Gymnasium, is a 1,215-seat multi-purpose arena on the campus of Indiana University Indianapolis in Indianapolis. It has hosted the IU Indy Jaguars men's basketball team since 2024, and has continuously hosted the women's basketball and volleyball teams since 1982. From 2014 to 2024, the men's basketball team was hosted by the Corteva Coliseum located on the Indiana State Fairgrounds. The Jungle also holds various sports classes for the Indiana University School of Physical Education.
