= Hilliard Gates Sports Center =

College sports center in Indiana, U.S.

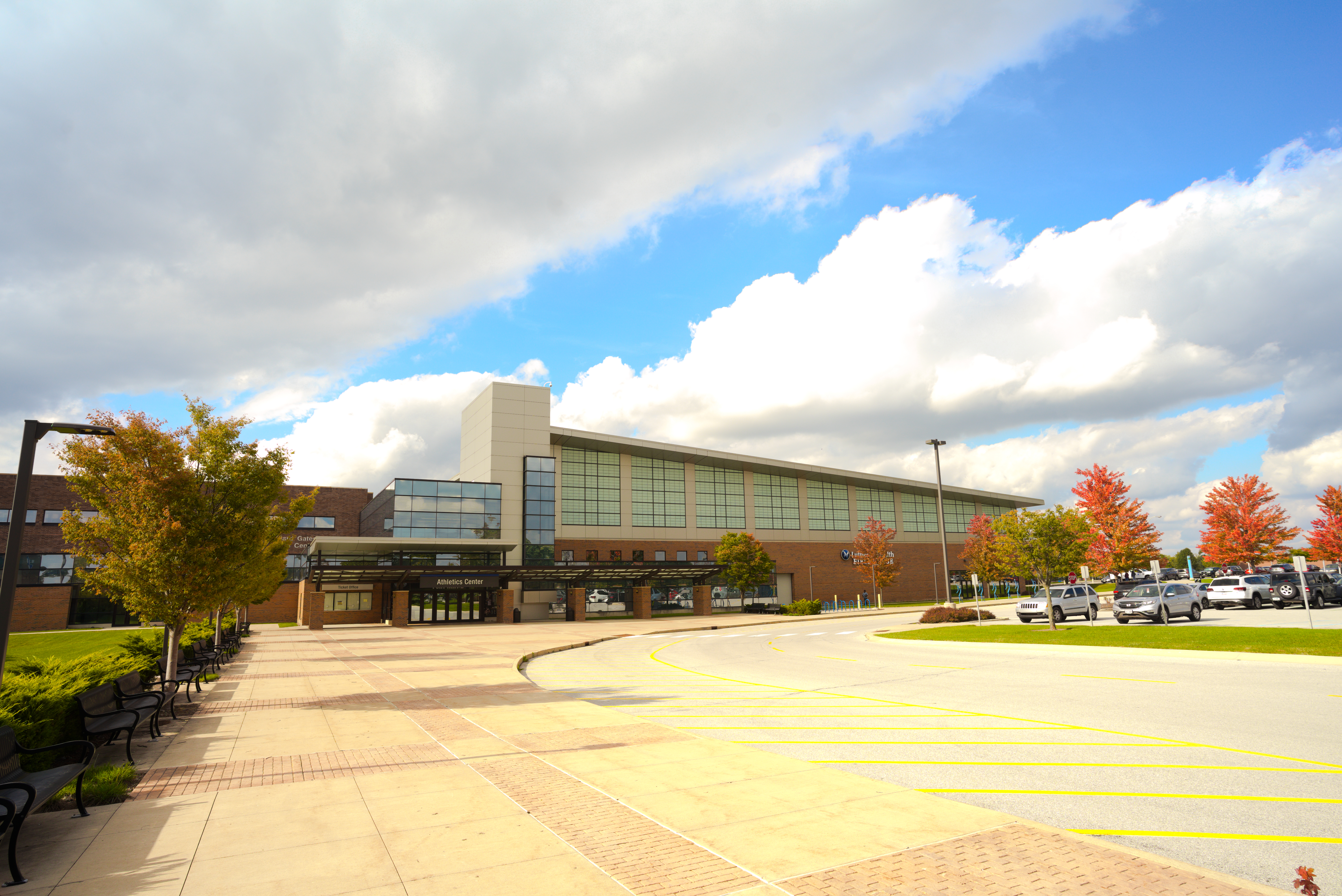
- The Gates Center (left) in 2021
- Interactive map of Hilliard Gates Sports Center
- Location: 2101 E. Coliseum Blvd; Fort Wayne, Indiana 46835
- Coordinates: 41.1190°N 85.1076°W
- Owner: Purdue University Fort Wayne
- Operator: Purdue University Fort Wayne
- Capacity: 2,300
- Surface: Hardwood

Construction
- Opened: 1981
- Renovated: 2010

Tenant
- Purdue Fort Wayne Mastodons (NCAA) (1981–2001; 2013–present)

Hilliard Gates Sports Center is a multi-purpose arena located in the northeast corner of the Purdue University Fort Wayne campus, in Fort Wayne, Indiana. It opened in 1981 and contains 68,106 square feet (6,327.3 m^{2}) of space. It is home to the Purdue Fort Wayne Mastodons volleyball and men's and women's basketball teams.

The venue is named for former area sportscaster Hilliard Gates. Before being renamed in his honor in 1991, the Gates Center was known as the Multipurpose Building.

The center was damaged by two burst pipes in 2019, which released 20,000 to 40,000 gallons of water, forcing the cancellation of an indoor track meet.

In addition to its use as a venue for intercollegiate competition, the Gates Center also has fitness facilities for students and faculty. Alumni and members of the general public may also use these facilities by purchasing a pass.

== See also ==
- List of NCAA Division I basketball arenas
