= 2024–25 Green Bay Phoenix women's basketball team =

American college basketball season

2024–25 Green Bay Phoenix women's basketball

Horizon League regular season and tournament champions

NCAA tournament, First Round
- Conference: Horizon League
- Record: 29–6 (19–1 Horizon)
- Head coach: Kayla Karius (1st season)
- Assistant coaches: Sarah Bronk; Kate Peterson Abiad; Liz Oswald; Shay Frederick
- Home arena: Kress Events Center

2024–25 Horizon League women's basketball standings
	Conf.				Overall
Team	W		L	PCT	W		L	PCT
Green Bay †	19	–	1	.950	29	–	6	.829
Purdue Fort Wayne	18	–	2	.900	27	–	9	.750
Cleveland State	14	–	6	.700	27	–	10	.730
Robert Morris	10	–	10	.500	15	–	16	.484
Northern Kentucky	8	–	12	.400	11	–	21	.344
Detroit Mercy	8	–	12	.400	15	–	15	.500
IU Indy	8	–	12	.400	9	–	21	.300
Wright State	7	–	13	.350	10	–	22	.313
Youngstown State	7	–	13	.350	12	–	19	.387
Oakland	6	–	14	.300	9	–	22	.290
Milwaukee	5	–	15	.250	8	–	24	.250
† 2025 Horizon League tournament winner

The 2024–25 Green Bay Phoenix women's basketball team represented the University of Wisconsin–Green Bay during the 2024–25 NCAA Division I women's basketball season. The Phoenix, led by first-year head coach Kayla Karius, played their home games at the Kress Events Center in Green Bay, Wisconsin as members of the Horizon League. Seniors Natalie McNeal and Maddy Schreiber earned first team All-Conference honors while guard Bailey Butler was named conference defensive player of the year.

== Previous season ==
The Phoenix finished the 2023–24 season 27–7, 17–3 in Horizon League play, to finish in second place. They defeated Youngstown State, Purdue Fort Wayne, and top-seeded Cleveland State to win the Horizon League tournament championship, earning the conference's automatic bid to the NCAA tournament, their first appearance since 2018. They received the #11 seed in the Portland Regional 4, where they would fall to #6 region seed Tennessee in the first round.

On April 10, 2024, longtime head coach Kevin Borseth announced his retirement, ending his second stint as head coach, and his 21st season overall. On April 23, the school announced that they would be hiring South Dakota head coach and Green Bay alum Kayla Karius as the team's next head coach.

== Roster ==
2024–25 Green Bay Phoenix women's basketball team
Players
Coaches

Pos.	#	Name	Height	Year	Previous school	Hometown
G	1	Cassie Schiltz	5 ft 11 in (1.8 m)	RS Sr	Luxemburg-Casco High School	Luxemburg, Wisconsin
G	3	Miah Meyer	5 ft 8 in (1.73 m)	Sr	Eastern Illinois	Silver Lake, Minnesota
G	4	Maren Westin (injured)	5 ft 8 in (1.73 m)	So	Becker High School	Becker, Minnesota
F	5	Sophie Lahti	6 ft 1 in (1.85 m)	RS Fr	Pine City High School	Pine City, Minnesota
G	10	Julianna Ouimette (redshirt)	5 ft 10 in (1.78 m)	Fr	Lehigh	Minocqua, Wisconsin
G	11	Natalie McNeal	5 ft 8 in (1.73 m)	Sr	Saint Louis	Germantown, Wisconsin
G	12	Callie Genke	6 ft 0 in (1.83 m)	Sr	Freedom High School	Wrightstown, Wisconsin
F	21	Jasmine Kondrakiewicz	6 ft 1 in (1.85 m)	Sr	Pius XI High School	Milwaukee, Wisconsin
G	22	Bailey Butler	5 ft 7 in (1.7 m)	Sr	Black Hawk High School	South Wayne, Wisconsin
G	24	Ellie Buzzelle	5 ft 8 in (1.73 m)	Jr	Eastern Illinois	Rogers, Minnesota
F/C	30	Jenna Guyer	6 ft 2 in (1.88 m)	RS Jr	Centennial High School	Circle Pines, Minnesota
G/F	34	Maddy Schreiber	6 ft 0 in (1.83 m)	Sr	Kimberly High School	Appleton, Wisconsin
F/C	55	Meghan Schultz	6 ft 4 in (1.93 m)	RS Fr	New Berlin West High School	Waukesha, Wisconsin

Head coach

- Kayla Karius (Green Bay)

Assistant coach(es)

- Sarah Bronk (St. Thomas (MN))
- Kate Peterson Abiad (UW–Stevens Point)
- Liz Oswald (UW–Stout)
- Shay Frederick (Butler)

Legend

- (C) Team captain
- (S) Suspended
- (I) Ineligible
- (W) Walk-on
- Injured
- Current redshirt

Roster
Last update: February 4, 2025

== Schedule and results ==
Date time, TV	Rank^{#}	Opponent^{#}	Result	Record	High points	High rebounds	High assists	Site (attendance) city, state
Regular season
November 4, 2024*; 11:00 am, ESPN+		at No. 13 Kansas State	L 45–92	0–1	14 – McNeal	7 – McNeal	3 – Butler	Bramlage Coliseum (4,408); Manhattan, KS
November 9, 2024*; 1:00 pm, ESPN+/TV32		Northern Iowa	L 56–71	0–2	13 – McNeal	6 – Kondrakiewicz	5 – Schreiber	Kress Events Center (1,884); Green Bay, WI
November 13, 2024*; 7:00 pm, ESPN+		at UIC	W 74–71	1–2	25 – Schreiber	8 – McNeal	6 – tied	Credit Union 1 Arena (667); Chicago, IL
November 17, 2024*; 2:00 pm, SLN		at North Dakota	W 66–63	2–2	13 – Schreiber	10 – Kondrakiewicz	5 – Butler	Betty Engelstad Sioux Center (1,599); Grand Forks, ND
November 21, 2024*; 6:00 pm, ESPN+		DePaul	W 70–57	3–2	17 – McNeal	5 – tied	6 – Schreiber	Kress Events Center (1,869); Green Bay, WI
November 28, 2024*; 10:00 am, FloHoops		vs. Virginia; Puerto Rico Shootout	L 61–66	3–3	18 – Genke	10 – Kondrakiewicz	5 – Butler	Coliseo Guillermo Angulo (250); San Juan, PR
November 29, 2024*; 10:00 am, FloHoops		vs. Drake; Puerto Rico Shootout	W 64–59	4–3	15 – McNeal	8 – McNeal	3 – Schreiber	Coliseo Guillermo Angulo (250); San Juan, PR
November 30, 2024*; 9:00 am, FloHoops		vs. Norfolk State; Puerto Rico Shootout	W 55–54	5–3	23 – Schreiber	12 – Kondrakiewicz	4 – Kondrakiewicz	Coliseo Guillermo Angulo (250); San Juan, PR
December 4, 2024; 6:00 pm, ESPN+		IU Indy	W 78–56	6–3 (1–0)	16 – Schreiber	8 – Kondrakiewicz	6 – Butler	Kress Events Center (1,640); Green Bay, WI
December 7, 2024; 1:00 pm, ESPN+		at Purdue Fort Wayne	L 66–67	6–4 (1–1)	20 – Kondrakiewicz	13 – Kondrakiewicz	5 – Butler	Gates Sports Center (478); Fort Wayne, IN
December 11, 2024; 6:00 pm, ESPN+		at Milwaukee	W 86–53	7–4 (2–1)	20 – Schreiber	7 – McNeal	12 – Butler	Klotsche Center (624); Milwaukee, WI
December 14, 2024*; 1:00 pm, ESPN+		Creighton	L 52–74	7–5	19 – McNeal	6 – tied	3 – McNeal	Kress Events Center (1,938); Green Bay, WI
December 19, 2024*; 6:00 pm, ESPN+		Ripon	W 75–42	8–5	15 – McNeal	13 – Kondrakiewicz	6 – Meyer	Kress Events Center (1,810); Green Bay, WI
December 21, 2024*; 1:00 pm, ESPN+		Parkside	W 72–39	9–5	18 – Guyer	9 – McNeal	6 – Schiltz	Kress Events Center (1,843); Green Bay, WI
January 2, 2025; 6:00 pm, ESPN+		Northern Kentucky	W 78–59	10–5 (3–1)	22 – Guyer	9 – McNeal	11 – Butler	Kress Events Center (1,750); Green Bay, WI
January 4, 2025; 1:00 pm, ESPN+		Wright State	W 69–51	11–5 (4–1)	14 – Genke	10 – Guyer	8 – Butler	Kress Events Center (1,904); Green Bay, WI
January 9, 2025; 5:30 pm, ESPN+		at Youngstown State	W 58–50	12–5 (5–1)	17 – McNeal	5 – tied	5 – Butler	Beeghly Center (1,328); Youngstown, OH
January 11, 2025; 1:00 pm, ESPN+		at Robert Morris	W 78–48	13–5 (6–1)	22 – McNeal	18 – McNeal	5 – tied	UPMC Events Center (207); Moon Township, PA
January 16, 2025; 6:00 pm, ESPN+		Detroit Mercy	W 70–47	14–5 (7–1)	17 – Kondrakiewicz	9 – Kondrakiewicz	6 – tied	Kress Events Center (1,619); Green Bay, WI
January 18, 2025; 1:00 pm, ESPN+		Oakland	W 69–39	15–5 (8–1)	22 – Genke	8 – McNeal	6 – Butler	Kress Events Center (1,969); Green Bay, WI
January 23, 2025; 6:00 pm, ESPN+		at Wright State	W 75–62	16–5 (9–1)	31 – Kondrakiewicz	12 – McNeal	5 – McNeal	Nutter Center (1,038); Fairborn, OH
January 25, 2025; 12:00 pm, ESPN+		at Northern Kentucky	W 64–56	17–5 (10–1)	14 – Schiltz	9 – Kondrakiewicz	8 – Butler	Truist Arena (1,380); Highland Heights, KY
January 30, 2025; 6:00 pm, ESPN+/TV32		Cleveland State	W 66–52	18–5 (11–1)	24 – McNeal	7 – tied	6 – Meyer	Kress Events Center (2,177); Green Bay, WI
February 2, 2025; 1:00 pm, ESPN+		at IU Indy	W 76–54	19–5 (12–1)	15 – tied	6 – tied	4 – tied	The Jungle (595); Indianapolis, IN
February 6, 2025; 6:00 pm, ESPN+		Youngstown State	W 58–47	20–5 (13–1)	13 – tied	9 – Kondrakiewicz	4 – Butler	Kress Events Center (1,902); Green Bay, WI
February 8, 2025; 1:00 pm, ESPN+		Robert Morris	W 71–39	21–5 (14–1)	18 – Schreiber	6 – Schreiber	5 – Meyer	Kress Events Center (1,952); Green Bay, WI
February 13, 2025; 6:00 pm, ESPN+		at Oakland	W 75–39	22–5 (15–1)	15 – Schlitz	8 – McNeal	8 – Butler	OU Credit Union O'rena (273); Auburn Hills, MI
February 15, 2025; 12:00 pm, ESPN+		at Detroit Mercy	W 76–60	23–5 (16–1)	23 – McNeal	11 – McNeal	5 – tied	Calihan Hall (303); Detroit, MI
February 19, 2025; 6:00 pm, ESPN+		at Cleveland State	W 59–50	24–5 (17–1)	16 – Schreiber	12 – McNeal	3 – tied	Wolstein Center (508); Cleveland, OH
February 22, 2025; 1:00 pm, ESPN+		Milwaukee	W 68–45	25–5 (18–1)	18 – Schreiber	6 – tied	9 – Butler	Kress Events Center (2,332); Green Bay, WI
March 1, 2025; 1:00 pm, ESPN+		Purdue Fort Wayne	W 68–63	26–5 (19–1)	27 – McNeal	13 – McNeal	5 – Butler	Kress Events Center (3,561); Green Bay, WI
Horizon League tournament
March 6, 2025; 7:00 pm, ESPN+	(1)	(10) Oakland; Quarterfinal	W 84–55	27–5	21 – Schreiber	10 – Kondrakiewicz	4 – tied	Kress Events Center (2,273); Green Bay, WI
March 10, 2025; 11:00 am, ESPN+	(1)	vs. (4) Robert Morris; Semifinal	W 67–53	28–5	20 – McNeal	12 – McNeal	4 – Schiltz	Corteva Coliseum; Indianapolis, IN
March 11, 2025; 11:00 am, ESPN2	(1)	vs. (2) Purdue Fort Wayne; Championship	W 76–63	29–5	26 – McNeal	8 – tied	7 – Butler	Corteva Coliseum (3,900); Indianapolis, IN
NCAA Tournament
March 22, 2025*; 12:30 pm, ESPN2	(12 B2)	vs. (5 B2) No. 21 Alabama; First round	L 67–81	29–6	14 – Schreiber	7 – Schiltz	5 – Butler	Xfinity Center; College Park, MD
*Non-conference game. ^{#}Rankings from AP poll. (#) Tournament seedings in parentheses. All times are in Central.

== Injuries ==
On January 7, 2025, it was announced that sophomore guard Maren Westin had suffered a torn ACL, a torn MCL, and meniscus damage in her right knee in a practice session prior to the Phoenix’s loss versus Creighton on December 14th and sidelined her for the rest of the season. Westin received a medical redshirt for the season ending injury.
