= 2024–25 Purdue Fort Wayne Mastodons women's basketball team =

American college basketball season

2024–25 Purdue Fort Wayne Mastodons women's basketball

WNIT, Great 8
- Conference: Horizon League
- Record: 27–9 (18–2 Horizon)
- Head coach: Maria Marchesano (4th season)
- Associate head coach: Steven Asher
- Assistant coaches: Jazmyne Geist; Quincy Cunningham; Shayla Sellers; Wayne Kreiger
- Home arena: Gates Sports Center

2024–25 Horizon League women's basketball standings
	Conf.				Overall
Team	W		L	PCT	W		L	PCT
Green Bay †	19	–	1	.950	29	–	6	.829
Purdue Fort Wayne	18	–	2	.900	27	–	9	.750
Cleveland State	14	–	6	.700	27	–	10	.730
Robert Morris	10	–	10	.500	15	–	16	.484
Northern Kentucky	8	–	12	.400	11	–	21	.344
Detroit Mercy	8	–	12	.400	15	–	15	.500
IU Indy	8	–	12	.400	9	–	21	.300
Wright State	7	–	13	.350	10	–	22	.313
Youngstown State	7	–	13	.350	12	–	19	.387
Oakland	6	–	14	.300	9	–	22	.290
Milwaukee	5	–	15	.250	8	–	24	.250
† 2025 Horizon League tournament winner

The 2024–25 Purdue Fort Wayne Mastodons women's basketball team represented Purdue University Fort Wayne during the 2024–25 NCAA Division I women's basketball season. The Mastodons, led by fourth-year head coach Maria Marchesano, played their home games at the Gates Sports Center in Fort Wayne, Indiana, with two games at the Memorial Coliseum, as members of the Horizon League.

== Previous season ==
The Mastodons finished the 2023–24 season 23–13, 13–7 in Horizon League play, to finish in third place. They defeated Detroit Mercy, before falling to eventual tournament champions Green Bay in the semifinals of the Horizon League tournament. They received an at-large bid to the WNIT, where they would defeat Eastern Kentucky in the first round, and Cincinnati in the second round, before falling to eventual tournament champions Saint Louis in the Super 16.

== Roster ==
2024–25 Purdue Fort Wayne Mastodons women's basketball team
Players
Coaches

Pos.	#	Name	Height	Year	Previous school	Hometown
G	2	Taeya Steinauer	5 ft 11 in (1.8 m)	Fr	Lincoln Prep	Oakville, Ontario
G	4	Ella Riggs	5 ft 9 in (1.75 m)	RS So	Furman	Cincinnati, Ohio
G	5	Audra Emmerson	5 ft 7 in (1.7 m)	Sr	Fishers High School	Fishers, Indiana
G	7	Tia Morgan (5Y)	5 ft 8 in (1.73 m)	Sr	Arkansas–Pine Bluff	Chicago, Illinois
G	11	Sydney Freeman (5Y)	5 ft 8 in (1.73 m)	Sr	Dayton	Albion, Indiana
G/F	12	Reese Polega	6 ft 1 in (1.85 m)	Fr	West Catholic High School	Grand Rapids, Michigan
G	13	Amellia Bromenschenkel	5 ft 11 in (1.8 m)	GS	Mendota Township High School	Mendota, Illinois
F	21	Jazzlyn Linbo	6 ft 2 in (1.88 m)	Sr	Grant Community High School	Round Lake, Illinois
G	22	Lauren Ross	5 ft 10 in (1.78 m)	GS	Michigan State	Muskegon, Michigan
F	23	Jordan Reid	5 ft 10 in (1.78 m)	GS	Indiana Wesleyan	New Palestine, Indiana
G	24	Madelyn Geers	5 ft 9 in (1.75 m)	Fr	Kent City High School	Kent City, Michigan
F	30	Renna Schwieterman	6 ft 0 in (1.83 m)	So	Jay County High School	Portland, Indiana
F	32	Sydney Graber (5Y)	6 ft 1 in (1.85 m)	Sr	Central Michigan	Fort Wayne, Indiana
F	45	Hillary Offing	5 ft 11 in (1.8 m)	So	Penn State Lehigh Valley	Irmo, South Carolina

Head coach

- Maria Marchesano (Butler)

Assistant coach(es)

- Steven Asher (James Madison)
- Jazmyne Geist (Northern Kentucky)
- Quincy Cunningham (Purdue Fort Wayne)
- Shayla Sellers (Purdue Fort Wayne)
- Wayne Kreiger (Manchester)

Legend

- (C) Team captain
- (S) Suspended
- (I) Ineligible
- (W) Walk-on
- (5Y) Fifth-year senior
- Injured
- Current redshirt

Roster
Last update: February 4, 2025

== Schedule and results ==
Date time, TV	Rank^{#}	Opponent^{#}	Result	Record	High points	High rebounds	High assists	Site (attendance) city, state
Exhibition
October 29, 2024*; 11:00 am		Olivet	W 116–23	–	20 – Ross	6 – Graber	5 – Freeman	Gates Sports Center (814); Fort Wayne, IN
Regular season
November 6, 2024*; 7:00 pm, B1G+		at Purdue	L 77–87	0–1	16 – Linbo	6 – Linbo	3 – tied	Mackey Arena (3,531); West Lafayette, IN
November 9, 2024*; 8:00 pm, ESPN+		at Valparaiso	W 72–56	1–1	18 – Ross	7 – tied	5 – Bromenschenkel	Athletics–Recreation Center (493); Valparaiso, IN
November 12, 2024*; 4:00 pm, ESPN+		Defiance	W 104–31	2–1	15 – Ross	7 – Emmerson	5 – Graber	Memorial Coliseum (1,956); Fort Wayne, IN
November 18, 2024*; 6:00 pm, SECN+		at No. 15 Kentucky	L 67–79	2–2	21 – Ross	7 – Ross	5 – Freeman	Memorial Coliseum (4,156); Lexington, KY
November 21, 2024*; 6:30 pm, ESPN+		at Eastern Michigan	W 94–49	3–2	18 – Ross	5 – Bromenschenkel	4 – Linbo	George Gervin GameAbove Center (1,142); Ypsilanti, MI
November 26, 2024*; 12:00 pm, ESPN+		at Georgia State; GSU Thanksgiving Classic	L 56–57	3–3	12 – Ross	11 – Bromenschenkel	6 – Freeman	GSU Convocation Center (285); Atlanta, GA
November 27, 2024*; 2:00 pm, YouTube		vs. Campbell; GSU Thanksgiving Classic	L 67–71 ^{OT}	3–4	16 – Steinauer	9 – Bromenschenkel	3 – tied	GSU Convocation Center (320); Atlanta, GA
November 28, 2024*; 2:00 pm, YouTube		vs. Furman; GSU Thanksgiving Classic	L 84–88 ^{OT}	3–5	27 – Ross	6 – Steinauer	4 – Emmerson	GSU Convocation Center (285); Atlanta, GA
December 4, 2024; 7:00 pm, ESPN+		Robert Morris	W 68–57	4–5 (1–0)	25 – Ross	10 – Linbo	5 – Freeman	Gates Sports Center (452); Fort Wayne, IN
December 7, 2024; 2:00 pm, ESPN+		Green Bay	W 67–66	5–5 (2–0)	25 – Ross	5 – tied	4 – Linbo	Gates Sports Center (478); Fort Wayne, IN
December 11, 2024; 6:30 pm, ESPN+		at IU Indy	W 79–71	6–5 (3–0)	19 – Bromenschenkel	7 – Bromenschenkel	2 – tied	The Jungle (377); Indianapolis, IN
December 14, 2024*; 11:00 am, ESPN+		Aquinas	W 115–41	7–5	19 – tied	8 – Bromenschenkel	4 – tied	Gates Sports Center (439); Fort Wayne, IN
December 21, 2024*; 2:00 pm, ESPN+		Western Michigan	W 83–75	8–5	27 – Ross	9 – Bromenschenkel	3 – Freeman	Gates Sports Center (518); Fort Wayne, IN
December 28, 2024; 2:00 pm, ESPN+		at Wright State	W 76–49	9–5 (4–0)	16 – Bromenschenkel	8 – Linbo	2 – tied	Nutter Center (1,264); Fairborn, OH
January 1, 2025; 7:00 pm, ESPN+		Youngstown State	W 74–60	10–5 (5–0)	17 – Bromenschenkel	6 – Linbo	4 – Bromenschenkel	Gates Sports Center (474); Fort Wayne, IN
January 5, 2025; 2:00 pm, ESPN+		at Oakland	W 77–37	11–5 (6–0)	21 – Freeman	11 – Ross	5 – Schwieterman	OU Credit Union O'rena (507); Auburn Hills, MI
January 9, 2025; 7:00 pm, ESPN+		Milwaukee	W 70–58	12–5 (7–0)	16 – Ross	11 – Bromenschenkel	5 – Freeman	Gates Sports Center (418); Fort Wayne, IN
January 12, 2025; 2:00 pm, ESPN+		at Cleveland State	W 78–75	13–5 (8–0)	19 – Ross	8 – Reid	4 – Emmerson	Wolstein Center (322); Cleveland, OH
January 18, 2025; 2:00 pm, ESPN+		Northern Kentucky	W 76–52	14–5 (9–0)	23 – Ross	6 – tied	5 – tied	Gates Sports Center (716); Fort Wayne, IN
January 22, 2025; 7:00 pm, ESPN+		at Detroit Mercy	W 72–65	15–5 (10–0)	20 – Freeman	8 – Ross	5 – Linbo	Calihan Hall (405); Detroit, MI
January 25, 2025; 2:00 pm, ESPN+		IU Indy	W 82–55	16–5 (11–0)	20 – Ross	4 – tied	4 – tied	Gates Sports Center (589); Fort Wayne, IN
January 29, 2025; 6:30 pm, ESPN+		at Youngstown State	W 79–56	17–5 (12–0)	22 – Freeman	7 – Schwieterman	5 – Bromenschenkel	Beeghly Center (1,185); Youngstown, OH
January 31, 2025; 7:00 pm, ESPN+		at Robert Morris	W 63–54	18–5 (13–0)	15 – Schwieterman	7 – tied	3 – Ross	UPMC Events Center (321); Moon Township, PA
February 6, 2025; 7:00 pm, ESPN+		Oakland	W 75–46	19–5 (14–0)	15 – Emmerson	10 – Graber	4 – Ross	Gates Sports Center (634); Fort Wayne, IN
February 8, 2025; 4:00 pm, ESPN+		Wright State	W 74–52	20–5 (15–0)	20 – Ross	12 – Graber	2 – Ross	Memorial Coliseum (2,422); Fort Wayne, IN
February 15, 2025; 2:00 pm, ESPN+		Cleveland State	L 52–61	20–6 (15–1)	16 – Reid	9 – Bromenschenkel	2 – tied	Gates Sports Center (868); Fort Wayne, IN
February 20, 2025; 6:00 pm, ESPN+		at Northern Kentucky	W 69–57	21–6 (16–1)	17 – Freeman	6 – tied	3 – Emmerson	Truist Arena (1,425); Highland Heights, KY
February 23, 2025; 2:00 pm, ESPN+		Detroit Mercy	W 91–62	22–6 (17–1)	20 – Ross	8 – Linbo	6 – Linbo	Gates Sports Center (837); Fort Wayne, IN
February 27, 2025; 7:00 pm, ESPN+		at Milwaukee	W 82–46	23–6 (18–1)	12 – tied	7 – Linbo	4 – Emmerson	Klotsche Center (534); Milwaukee, WI
March 1, 2025; 2:00 pm, ESPN+		at Green Bay	L 63–68	23–7 (18–2)	18 – Bromenschenkel	6 – tied	6 – Freeman	Kress Events Center (3,561); Green Bay, WI
Horizon League tournament
March 6, 2025; 7:00 pm, ESPN+	(2)	(8) Wright State; Quarterfinal	W 64–50	24–7	15 – Bromenschenkel	9 – Linbo	3 – tied	Gates Sports Center (845); Fort Wayne, IN
March 10, 2025; 2:30 pm, ESPN+	(2)	vs. (3) Cleveland State; Semifinal	W 83–65	25–7	23 – Bromenschenkel	8 – Linbo	6 – Emmerson	Corteva Coliseum (1,500); Indianapolis, IN
March 11, 2025; 12:00 pm, ESPN2	(2)	vs. (1) Green Bay; Championship	L 63–75	25–8	18 – Freeman	4 – Linbo	3 – Emmerson	Corteva Coliseum (3,900); Indianapolis, IN
WNIT
March 25, 2025*; 7:00 pm, ESPN+		Old Dominion; Second Round	W 87–61	26–8	17 – Emmerson	11 – Ross	5 – Ross	Gates Sports Center (756); Fort Wayne, IN
March 28, 2025*; 7:00 pm, ESPN+		Butler; Super 16	W 87–61	27–8	25 – Bromenschenkel	6 – Bromenschenkel	3 – Freeman	Gates Sports Center; Fort Wayne, IN
March 31, 2025*; 7:00 pm, ESPN+		Cleveland State; Great 8	L 65–76	27–9	14 – Ross	4 – tied	4 – tied	Gates Sports Center (1,053); Fort Wayne, IN
*Non-conference game. ^{#}Rankings from AP poll. (#) Tournament seedings in parentheses. All times are in Eastern.
