= 2024–25 Milwaukee Panthers women's basketball team =

American college basketball season

2024–25 Milwaukee Panthers women's basketball
- Conference: Horizon League
- Record: 8–24 (5–15 Horizon)
- Head coach: Kyle Rechlicz (13th season)
- Associate head coach: Stacy Cantley
- Assistant coaches: Cassie Lastivka; Malika Glover; Anthony Houston; Fletcher Brown
- Home arena: Klotsche Center

2024–25 Horizon League women's basketball standings
| | Conf. | | | | Overall |
| Team | W | | L | PCT | W | | L | PCT |
|---|---|---|---|---|---|---|---|---|
| Green Bay † | 19 | – | 1 | .950 | 29 | – | 6 | .829 |
| Purdue Fort Wayne | 18 | – | 2 | .900 | 27 | – | 9 | .750 |
| Cleveland State | 14 | – | 6 | .700 | 27 | – | 10 | .730 |
| Robert Morris | 10 | – | 10 | .500 | 15 | – | 16 | .484 |
| Northern Kentucky | 8 | – | 12 | .400 | 11 | – | 21 | .344 |
| Detroit Mercy | 8 | – | 12 | .400 | 15 | – | 15 | .500 |
| IU Indy | 8 | – | 12 | .400 | 9 | – | 21 | .300 |
| Wright State | 7 | – | 13 | .350 | 10 | – | 22 | .313 |
| Youngstown State | 7 | – | 13 | .350 | 12 | – | 19 | .387 |
| Oakland | 6 | – | 14 | .300 | 9 | – | 22 | .290 |
| Milwaukee | 5 | – | 15 | .250 | 8 | – | 24 | .250 |
† 2025 Horizon League tournament winner

The 2024–25 Milwaukee Panthers women's basketball team represented the University of Wisconsin–Milwaukee during the 2024–25 NCAA Division I women's basketball season. The Panthers, led by 13th-year head coach Kyle Rechlicz, played their home games at the Klotsche Center in Milwaukee, Wisconsin as members of the Horizon League. The Panthers finished the season 8–24, 5–15 in Horizon League play, to finish in eleventh (last) place.

== Previous season ==
The Panthers finished the 2023–24 season 16–16, 10–10 in Horizon League play, to finish in fifth place. They were defeated by Wright State in the quarterfinals of the Horizon League tournament.

== Roster ==
2024–25 Milwaukee Panthers women's basketball team
Players
Coaches

| Pos. | # | Name | Height | Year | Previous school | Hometown |
|---|---|---|---|---|---|---|
| G | 00 | Hallie Majoros | 5 ft 9 in (1.75 m) | RS So | Nordonia High School | Sagamore Hills, OH |
| G | 1 | Kendall Barnes | 5 ft 7 in (1.7 m) | Fr | East Ridge High School | Minneapolis, MN |
| G | 2 | Jada Williams | 5 ft 10 in (1.78 m) | RS So | Mason City High School | Mason City, IA |
| F | 4 | Anna Lutz | 6 ft 1 in (1.85 m) | Sr | Marshall High School | Marshall, WI |
| G/F | 5 | Payton Rechlicz | 5 ft 11 in (1.8 m) | RS Fr | Menomonee Falls High School | Menomonee Falls, WI |
| F | 11 | Izzy Pugh | 6 ft 3 in (1.91 m) | RS Fr | Westlake Girls High School | Auckland, New Zealand |
| G | 14 | Kacee Baumhower | 5 ft 9 in (1.75 m) | Sr | Wright State | Sylvania, OH |
| G | 22 | Kallie Peppler | 6 ft 0 in (1.83 m) | Fr | Hortonville High School | Hortonville, WI |
| G | 23 | Kamy Peppler | 5 ft 7 in (1.7 m) | Jr | Hortonville High School | Hortonville, WI |
| G | 24 | Jada Donaldson | 5 ft 7 in (1.7 m) | Sr | Beaver Dam High School | Beaver Dam, WI |
| G | 25 | Justina Hernandez | 5 ft 8 in (1.73 m) | RS Jr | Glenbard North High School | Carol Stream, IL |
| G | 30 | Sophia Rampulla | 5 ft 11 in (1.8 m) | RS Fr | Union Grove High School | Union Grove, WI |
| F | 32 | Jorey Buwalda | 6 ft 0 in (1.83 m) | So | Randolph High School | Randolph, WI |
| C | 45 | Cece McNair | 6 ft 2 in (1.88 m) | Fr | Prior Lake High School | Prior Lake, MN |
| G | 52 | Grace Lomen | 5 ft 10 in (1.78 m) | Jr | Parkside | East Troy, WI |

Head coach

- Kyle Rechlicz (Wisconsin)

Assistant coach(es)

- Stacy Cantley (UNC Wilmington)
- Cassie Lastivka (Ohio Northern)
- Malika Glover (Northern Kentucky)
- Anthony Houston (St. Mary's (TX))
- Fletcher Brown (UMaine Fort Kent)

Legend

- (C) Team captain
- (S) Suspended
- (I) Ineligible
- (W) Walk-on
- Injured
- Current redshirt

Roster
Last update: February 13, 2025

== Schedule and results ==
| Date time, TV | Rank^{#} | Opponent^{#} | Result | Record | High points | High rebounds | High assists | Site (attendance) city, state |
Regular season
| November 4, 2024*; 5:00 p.m., SLN | | at St. Thomas | L 81–84 ^{OT} | 0–1 | 26 – Baumhower | 11 – Lutz | 5 – Kam. Peppler | Schoenecker Arena (538); St. Paul, MN |
| November 6, 2024*; 6:00 p.m., ESPN+ | | Carroll | W 74–49 | 1–1 | 14 – 2 tied | 8 – Donaldson | 10 – Kam. Peppler | Klotsche Center (676); Milwaukee, WI |
| November 9, 2024*; 1:00 p.m., ESPN+ | | Butler | L 70–79 ^{OT} | 1–2 | 24 – Baumhower | 8 – Lutz | 7 – Kam. Peppler | Klotsche Center (454); Milwaukee, WI |
| November 14, 2024*; 6:00 p.m., ESPN+ | | Valparaiso | W 90–79 | 2–2 | 28 – Baumhower | 10 – Lutz | 8 – Kam. Peppler | Klotsche Center (574); Milwaukee, WI |
| November 17, 2024*; 2:00 p.m., B1G+ | | at Wisconsin | L 45–82 | 2–3 | 11 – Baumhower | 5 – 2 tied | 2 – Kam. Peppler | Kohl Center (3,410); Madison, WI |
| November 20, 2024*; 6:30 p.m., ESPN+ | | at No. 10 Kansas State | L 46–111 | 2–4 | 8 – Buwalda | 3 – 2 tied | 2 – Rampulla | Bramlage Coliseum (3,438); Manhattan, KS |
| November 24, 2024*; 12:00 p.m., ESPN+ | | Northern Illinois | L 60–67 | 2–5 | 21 – Baumhower | 6 – Lutz | 5 – 3 tied | Klotsche Center (573); Milwaukee, WI |
| November 27, 2024*; 5:30 p.m. | | vs. American; Puerto Rico Clasico | W 74–60 | 3–5 | 25 – Baumhower | 9 – 2 tied | 10 – Kam. Peppler | Coliseo Rubén Rodríguez (100); Bayamón, Puerto Rico |
| November 28, 2024*; 5:30 p.m. | | vs. Air Force; Puerto Rico Clasico | L 40–56 | 3–6 | 16 – Lutz | 8 – 2 tied | 6 – Kam. Peppler | Coliseo Rubén Rodríguez (100); Bayamón, Puerto Rico |
| December 4, 2024; 5:30 p.m., ESPN+ | | at Youngstown State | L 50–66 | 3–7 (0–1) | 15 – Lutz | 7 – Lutz | 3 – Rechlicz | Beeghly Center (1,343); Youngstown, OH |
| December 7, 2024; 1:00 p.m., ESPN+ | | at Robert Morris | L 55–56 | 3–8 (0–2) | 14 – Donaldson | 5 – 2 tied | 5 – Kam. Peppler | UPMC Events Center (109); Moon Township, PA |
| December 11, 2024; 6:00 p.m., ESPN+ | | Green Bay | L 53–86 | 3–9 (0–3) | 14 – Baumhower | 7 – Pugh | 3 – Kam. Peppler | Klotsche Center (624); Milwaukee, WI |
| December 15, 2024*; 2:00 p.m., FloHoops | | at Marquette | L 51–69 | 3–10 | 10 – Lutz | 7 – Kam. Peppler | 4 – Donaldson | Al McGuire Center (2,448); Milwaukee, WI |
| December 22, 2024*; 12:00 p.m., ESPN+ | | at Central Michigan | L 50–54 | 3–11 | 19 – Kam. Peppler | 6 – Baumhower | 2 – 2 tied | McGuirk Arena (990); Mount Pleasant, MI |
| December 29, 2024; 11:00 a.m., ESPN+ | | at Cleveland State | L 68–73 ^{OT} | 3–12 (0–4) | 20 – Lutz | 8 – Lutz | 7 – Kam. Peppler | Wolstein Center (321); Cleveland, OH |
| January 2, 2025; 6:00 p.m., ESPN+ | | Wright State | W 75–50 | 4–12 (1–4) | 18 – Baumhower | 8 – Buwalda | 11 – Kam. Peppler | Klotsche Center (685); Milwaukee, WI |
| January 4, 2025; 2:00 p.m., ESPN+ | | Northern Kentucky | L 65–68 | 4–13 (1–5) | 13 – 2 tied | 5 – 2 tied | 5 – Kam. Peppler | Klotsche Center (628); Milwaukee, WI |
| January 9, 2025; 6:00 p.m., ESPN+ | | at Purdue Fort Wayne | L 58–70 | 4–14 (1–6) | 19 – Rechlicz | 8 – 2 tied | 5 – Kam. Peppler | Gates Sports Center (418); Fort Wayne, IN |
| January 16, 2025; 11:00 a.m., ESPN+ | | Oakland | L 72–75 ^{OT} | 4–15 (1–7) | 30 – Lutz | 9 – Lutz | 7 – Kam. Peppler | Klotsche Center (2,091); Milwaukee, WI |
| January 18, 2025; 2:00 p.m., ESPN+ | | Detroit Mercy | L 52–54 | 4–16 (1–8) | 13 – Lutz | 8 – Lutz | 6 – Kam. Peppler | Klotsche Center (637); Milwaukee, WI |
| January 23, 2025; 5:00 p.m., ESPN+ | | at Northern Kentucky | L 62–66 | 4–17 (1–9) | 20 – Buwalda | 7 – Buwalda | 3 – 2 tied | Truist Arena (1,277); Highland Heights, KY |
| January 25, 2025; 3:00 p.m., ESPN+ | | at Wright State | L 61–69 | 4–18 (1–10) | 13 – Baumhower | 9 – Buwalda | 4 – Lutz | Nutter Center (1,234); Fairborn, OH |
| January 29, 2025; 5:30 p.m., ESPN+ | | at IU Indy | W 66–62 | 5–18 (2–10) | 15 – Lutz | 6 – Rechlicz | 5 – Baumhower | The Jungle (467); Indianapolis, IN |
| February 1, 2025; 2:00 p.m., ESPN+ | | Cleveland State | L 81–89 | 5–19 (2–11) | 21 – Baumhower | 5 – 2 tied | 8 – Kam. Peppler | Klotsche Center (600); Milwaukee, WI |
| February 6, 2025; 6:00 p.m., ESPN+ | | Robert Morris | L 52–58 | 5–20 (2–12) | 20 – Kam. Peppler | 6 – Donaldson | 3 – Baumhower | Klotsche Center (497); Milwaukee, WI |
| February 8, 2025; 2:00 p.m., ESPN+ | | Youngstown State | W 61–56 | 6–20 (3–12) | 20 – Lutz | 8 – Lutz | 5 – Donaldson | Klotsche Center (606); Milwaukee, WI |
| February 13, 2025; 6:00 p.m., ESPN+ | | at Detroit Mercy | L 46–50 | 6–21 (3–13) | 13 – Donaldson | 7 – Lutz | 3 – Baumhower | Calihan Hall (405); Detroit, MI |
| February 15, 2025; 1:00 p.m., ESPN+ | | at Oakland | W 61–49 | 7–21 (4–13) | 12 – Kal. Peppler | 6 – Baumhower | 4 – 2 tied | OU Credit Union O'rena (522); Auburn Hills, MI |
| February 19, 2025; 6:00 p.m., ESPN+ | | IU Indy | W 77–70 | 8–21 (5–13) | 26 – Kam. Peppler | 9 – Lutz | 8 – Kam. Peppler | Klotsche Center (427); Milwaukee, WI |
| February 22, 2025; 1:00 p.m., ESPN+ | | at Green Bay | L 45–68 | 8–22 (5–14) | 10 – Lutz | 5 – Kam. Peppler | 2 – 3 tied | Kress Events Center (2,332); Green Bay, WI |
| February 27, 2025; 6:00 p.m., ESPN+ | | Purdue Fort Wayne | L 46–82 | 8–23 (5–15) | 9 – Pugh | 5 – 2 tied | 3 – Kam. Peppler | Klotsche Center (534); Milwaukee, WI |
Horizon League tournament
| March 4, 2025; 7:00 p.m., ESPN+ | (11) | vs. (6) Detroit Mercy; Quarterfinals | L 62–73 | 8–24 | 20 – Kam. Peppler | 7 – Lutz | 4 – 2 tied | Calihan Hall (227); Detroit, MI |
*Non-conference game. ^{#}Rankings from AP poll. (#) Tournament seedings in parentheses. All times are in Central.
