= 2024–25 Wright State Raiders women's basketball team =

American college basketball season

2024–25 Wright State Raiders women's basketball
- Conference: Horizon League
- Record: 6–19 (4–11 Horizon)
- Head coach: Kari Hoffman (4th season)
- Associate head coach: John Leonzo
- Assistant coaches: Patrick Bain; Lauryn Fox
- Home arena: Nutter Center

2024–25 Horizon League women's basketball standings
	Conf.				Overall
Team	W		L	PCT	W		L	PCT
Green Bay †	19	–	1	.950	29	–	6	.829
Purdue Fort Wayne	18	–	2	.900	27	–	9	.750
Cleveland State	14	–	6	.700	27	–	10	.730
Robert Morris	10	–	10	.500	15	–	16	.484
Northern Kentucky	8	–	12	.400	11	–	21	.344
Detroit Mercy	8	–	12	.400	15	–	15	.500
IU Indy	8	–	12	.400	9	–	21	.300
Wright State	7	–	13	.350	10	–	22	.313
Youngstown State	7	–	13	.350	12	–	19	.387
Oakland	6	–	14	.300	9	–	22	.290
Milwaukee	5	–	15	.250	8	–	24	.250
† 2025 Horizon League tournament winner

The 2024–25 Wright State Raiders women's basketball team represented Wright State University during the 2024–25 NCAA Division I women's basketball season. The Raiders, led by fourth-year head coach Kari Hoffman, played their home games at the Nutter Center in Fairborn, Ohio as members of the Horizon League.

== Previous season ==
The Raiders finished the 2023–24 season 18–15, 11–9 in Horizon League play, to finish in fourth place. They defeated Milwaukee before falling to top-seeded Cleveland State in the semifinals of the Horizon League tournament.

== Roster ==
2024–25 Wright State Raiders women's basketball team
Players
Coaches

Pos.	#	Name	Height	Year	Previous school	Hometown
G	1	Rylee Sagester	5 ft 7 in (1.7 m)	RS Fr	Tri-Village High School	West Alexandria, Ohio
G	3	Makiya Miller	5 ft 7 in (1.7 m)	Jr	Reynoldsburg High School	Reynoldsburg, Ohio
G	5	Claire Henson	5 ft 10 in (1.78 m)	Jr	LIU	Germantown, Ohio
G	10	Macie Taylor	5 ft 7 in (1.7 m)	RS So	Troy High School	Troy, Ohio
G	12	Ellie Magestro-Kennedy	5 ft 9 in (1.75 m)	RS Fr	Janesville Craig High School	Stoughton, Wisconsin
G	15	Abbie Riddle	5 ft 10 in (1.78 m)	RS Fr	Bowling Green	Baltimore, Ohio
G	20	Makenzie Drout	5 ft 9 in (1.75 m)	So	Appalachian State	Kimberly, Wisconsin
G	21	Lauren Scott	5 ft 7 in (1.7 m)	Jr	Worthington Kilbourne High School	Columbus, Ohio
F	23	Florrie Cotterill	6 ft 2 in (1.88 m)	Fr	Itchen College	Lee-on-the-Solent, England
G	24	Olivia Brown	5 ft 7 in (1.7 m)	So	Akron	Fishers, Indiana
F	32	Amaya Staton	6 ft 1 in (1.85 m)	GS	Merrimack	Lorain, Ohio
G	33	Elle Bruschuk	6 ft 0 in (1.83 m)	Fr	Willowbrook High School	Villa Park, Illinois
F	43	Chloe Chard Peloquin	6 ft 3 in (1.91 m)	Jr	Canisius	Johnstown, Ohio

Head coach

- Kari Hoffman (Cedarville)

Assistant coach(es)

- John Leonzo (Cedarville)
- Patrick Bain (Cedarville)
- Lauryn Fox (Cedarville)

Legend

- (C) Team captain
- (S) Suspended
- (I) Ineligible
- (W) Walk-on
- Injured
- Current redshirt

Roster
Last update: February 12, 2025

== Schedule and results ==
Date time, TV	Rank^{#}	Opponent^{#}	Result	Record	Site (attendance) city, state
Regular season
November 5, 2024*; 7:30 pm, B1G+		at Wisconsin	L 68–95	0–1	Kohl Center (2,850); Madison, WI
November 10, 2024*; 12:00 pm, ESPN+		at Evansville	L 63–65	0–2	Meeks Family Fieldhouse (392); Evansville, IN
November 12, 2024*; 7:00 pm, ESPN+		Indiana State	L 51–68	0–3	Nutter Center (1,077); Fairborn, OH
November 15, 2024*; 11:00 am, ESPN+		Tennessee State	W 77–65	1–3	Nutter Center (5,912); Fairborn, OH
November 21, 2024*; 6:30 pm, ESPN+		at Bellarmine	L 71–79	1–4	Knights Hall (472); Louisville, KY
November 24, 2024*; 7:00 pm, ESPN+		Ohio	W 68–57	2–4	Nutter Center (1,216); Fairborn, OH
November 26, 2024*; 7:00 pm, ESPN+		Findlay	L 64–65	2–5	Nutter Center (1,063); Fairborn, OH
December 4, 2024; 7:00 pm, ESPN+		at Detroit Mercy	L 56–67	2–6 (0–1)	Calihan Hall (309); Detroit, MI
December 6, 2024; 7:00 pm, ESPN+		at Oakland	L 70–84	2–7 (0–2)	OU Credit Union O'rena (629); Auburn Hills, MI
December 16, 2024; 7:00 pm, ESPN+		Cleveland State	L 71–85	2–8 (0–3)	Nutter Center (1,318); Fairborn, OH
December 18, 2024*; 4:30 pm, ESPN+		at Grand Canyon; GCU Christmas Classic	L 69–82	2–9	Global Credit Union Arena (298); Phoenix, AZ
December 19, 2024*; 2:00 pm, GCU Lopes Live		vs. Georgia Southern; GCU Christmas Classic	L 82–88	2–10	Global Credit Union Arena (106); Phoenix, AZ
December 21, 2024*; 12:00 pm, GCU Lopes Live		vs. Florida Atlantic; GCU Christmas Classic	L 52–68	2–11	Global Credit Union Arena (101); Phoenix, AZ
December 28, 2024; 2:00 pm, ESPN+		Purdue Fort Wayne	L 49–76	2–12 (0–4)	Nutter Center (1,264); Fairborn, OH
January 2, 2025; 7:00 pm, ESPN+		at Milwaukee	L 50–75	2–13 (0–5)	Klotsche Center (685); Milwaukee, WI
January 4, 2025; 2:00 pm, ESPN+		at Green Bay	L 51–69	2–14 (0–6)	Kress Events Center (1,904); Green Bay, WI
January 8, 2025; 7:00 pm, ESPN+		Detroit Mercy	W 67–64	3–14 (1–6)	Nutter Center (1,237); Fairborn, OH
January 12, 2025; 2:00 pm, ESPN+		Youngstown State	W 77–62	4–14 (2–6)	Nutter Center (1,174); Fairborn, OH
January 15, 2025; 6:30 pm, ESPN+		at IU Indy	L 63–75	4–15 (2–7)	The Jungle (496); Indianapolis, IN
January 23, 2025; 7:00 pm, ESPN+		Green Bay	L 62–75	4–16 (2–8)	Nutter Center (1,038); Fairborn, OH
January 25, 2025; 4:00 pm, ESPN+		Milwaukee	W 69–61	5–16 (3–8)	Nutter Center (1,234); Fairborn, OH
January 29, 2025; 7:00 pm, ESPN+		at Robert Morris	L 53–74	5–17 (3–9)	UPMC Events Center (231); Moon Township, PA
February 1, 2025; 2:00 pm, ESPN+		Northern Kentucky	W 75–67	6–17 (4–9)	Nutter Center (1,105); Fairborn, OH
February 5, 2025; 7:00 pm, ESPN+		IU Indy	L 68–80	6–18 (4–10)	Nutter Center (1,106); Fairborn, OH
February 8, 2025; 4:00 pm, ESPN+		at Purdue Fort Wayne	L 52–74	6–19 (4–11)	Memorial Coliseum (2,422); Fort Wayne, IN
February 13, 2025; 6:30 pm, ESPN+		at Youngstown State	W 78–76 ^{OT}	7–19 (5–11)	Beeghly Center (1,335); Youngstown, OH
February 19, 2025; 7:00 pm, ESPN+		Oakland	W 60–53	8–19 (6–11)	Nutter Center; Fairborn, OH
February 22, 2025; 1:00 pm, ESPN+		at Northern Kentucky	W 68–62	9–19 (7–11)	Truist Arena (1,751); Highland Heights, KY
February 26, 2025; 7:00 pm, ESPN+		at Cleveland State	L 46–81	9–20 (7–12)	Wolstein Center (533); Cleveland, OH
March 1, 2025; 2:00 pm, ESPN+		Robert Morris	L 57–73	9–21 (7–13)	Nutter Center (1,040); Fairborn, OH
Horizon League tournament
March 4, 2025; 5:30 pm, ESPN+	(8)	(9) Youngstown State; First Round	W 73–58	10–21	Nutter Center (943); Fairborn, OH
March 6, 2025; 7:00 pm, ESPN+	(8)	at (2) Purdue Fort Wayne; Quarterfinals	L 50–64	10–22	Memorial Coliseum (845); Fort Wayne, IN
*Non-conference game. ^{#}Rankings from AP Poll. (#) Tournament seedings in parentheses. All times are in Eastern.
