= 2024–25 Youngstown State Penguins women's basketball team =

American college basketball season

2024–25 Youngstown State Penguins women's basketball
- Conference: Horizon League
- Record: 12–19 (7–13 Horizon)
- Head coach: Melissa Jackson (1st season)
- Assistant coaches: Peyton Booth; Courtney Davidson; Shayna Gore
- Home arena: Beeghly Center

2024–25 Horizon League women's basketball standings
| | Conf. | | | | Overall |
| Team | W | | L | PCT | W | | L | PCT |
|---|---|---|---|---|---|---|---|---|
| Green Bay † | 19 | – | 1 | .950 | 29 | – | 6 | .829 |
| Purdue Fort Wayne | 18 | – | 2 | .900 | 27 | – | 9 | .750 |
| Cleveland State | 14 | – | 6 | .700 | 27 | – | 10 | .730 |
| Robert Morris | 10 | – | 10 | .500 | 15 | – | 16 | .484 |
| Northern Kentucky | 8 | – | 12 | .400 | 11 | – | 21 | .344 |
| Detroit Mercy | 8 | – | 12 | .400 | 15 | – | 15 | .500 |
| IU Indy | 8 | – | 12 | .400 | 9 | – | 21 | .300 |
| Wright State | 7 | – | 13 | .350 | 10 | – | 22 | .313 |
| Youngstown State | 7 | – | 13 | .350 | 12 | – | 19 | .387 |
| Oakland | 6 | – | 14 | .300 | 9 | – | 22 | .290 |
| Milwaukee | 5 | – | 15 | .250 | 8 | – | 24 | .250 |
† 2025 Horizon League tournament winner

The 2024–25 Youngstown State Penguins women's basketball team represented Youngstown State University during the 2024–25 NCAA Division I women's basketball season. The Penguins, led by first-year head coach Melissa Jackson, played their home games at the Beeghly Center in Youngstown, Ohio as members of the Horizon League.

== Previous season ==
The Penguins finished the 2023–24 season 14–18, 9–11 in Horizon League play, to finish in a tie for sixth place. They would defeat IUPUI, before falling to eventual tournament champions Green Bay in the quarterfinals of the Horizon League tournament. On October 2, 2023, it was announced that head coach John Barnes would be taking a leave of absence to focus on "personal family matters," with associate head coach John Nicolais serving as acting head coach in Barnes' absence. On January 19, 2024, Barnes announced that he would be stepping down after ten years at the helm, with associate head coach John Nicolais serving as interim head coach for the remainder of the season.

On March 14, 2024, the school announced that they would be hiring former Akron head coach and Cleveland State assistant Melissa Jackson as the team's new head coach.

== Roster ==
2024–25 Youngstown State Penguins women's basketball team
Players
Coaches

| Pos. | # | Name | Height | Year | Previous school | Hometown |
|---|---|---|---|---|---|---|
| G | 1 | Xoe Rosalez | 5 ft 6 in (1.68 m) | Jr | Seward County Community College | Seminole, Texas |
| G | 2 | Malia Magestro | 5 ft 9 in (1.75 m) | GS | Kennedy Catholic High School | Hermitage, Pennsylvania |
| G | 3 | Danielle Cameron | 5 ft 9 in (1.75 m) | Fr | Olmsted Falls High School | Olmsted Falls, Ohio |
| G | 4 | Erica King | 5 ft 7 in (1.7 m) | Fr | St. Vincent–St. Mary High School | Akron, Ohio |
| G | 5 | Hayden Barrier | 5 ft 7 in (1.7 m) | Fr | Montgomery County High School | Mount Sterling, Kentucky |
| G | 10 | Jewel Watkins | 5 ft 11 in (1.8 m) | Sr | Charlotte | Columbus, Ohio |
| G/F | 11 | Abby Liber | 6 ft 0 in (1.83 m) | Jr | Saint Louis | Avon, Ohio |
| G | 12 | Dacia Lewandowski | 5 ft 11 in (1.8 m) | RS Fr | Akron | Butler, Pennsylvania |
| F | 21 | Sophia Gregory | 6 ft 2 in (1.88 m) | Fr | West Branch High School | Alliance, Ohio |
| F | 22 | Faith Burch | 6 ft 1 in (1.85 m) | RS Jr | Cleveland State | Warren, Ohio |
| G | 23 | Haley Thierry | 5 ft 8 in (1.73 m) | Sr | Laurel School | Willoughby Hills, Ohio |
| G | 24 | Bella Samz | 5 ft 8 in (1.73 m) | So | Arrowhead High School | Oconomowoc, Wisconsin |
| F | 44 | Ashlynn Van Tassell | 6 ft 3 in (1.91 m) | Fr | Cameron High School | Cameron, West Virginia |
| F | 50 | Sarah Baker | 6 ft 2 in (1.88 m) | Fr | Ryle High School | Florence, Kentucky |

Head coach

- Melissa Jackson (Richmond)

Assistant coach(es)

- Peyton Booth (New Hampshire)
- Courtney Davidson (Michigan State)
- Shayna Gore (Marshall)

Legend

- (C) Team captain
- (S) Suspended
- (I) Ineligible
- (W) Walk-on
- Injured
- Current redshirt

Roster
Last update: February 12, 2025

== Schedule and results ==
| Date time, TV | Rank^{#} | Opponent^{#} | Result | Record | Site (attendance) city, state |
Regular season
| November 4, 2024*; 5:30 pm, ESPN+ | | North Dakota | Canceled due to power outage | | Beeghly Center; Youngstown, OH |
| November 8, 2024*; 6:30 pm, ESPN+ | | Lake Erie | W 95–39 | 1–0 | Beeghly Center (1,358); Youngstown, OH |
| November 12, 2024*; 6:30 pm, ESPN+ | | St. Bonaventure | W 60–52 | 2–0 | Beeghly Center (1,602); Youngstown, OH |
| November 15, 2024*; 6:30 pm, ESPN+ | | Clarion | W 69–52 | 3–0 | Beeghly Center (342); Youngstown, OH |
| November 19, 2024*; 11:00 am, ESPN+ | | Mercyhurst | W 64–56 | 4–0 | Beeghly Center (3,539); Youngstown, OH |
| November 23, 2024*; 11:00 am, ESPN+ | | at Bucknell | L 36–51 | 4–1 | Sojka Pavilion (198); Lewisburg, PA |
| November 26, 2024*; 7:00 pm, FloHoops | | at Xavier | L 43–61 | 4–2 | Cintas Center (518); Cincinnati, OH |
| November 29, 2024*; 11:00 am | | vs. Southern Indiana; Puerto Rico Clasico | L 34–70 | 4–3 | Juan Cruz Abreu Coliseum (100); Manatí, PR |
| November 30, 2024*; 1:30 pm | | vs. Towson; Puerto Rico Clasico | L 57–68 | 4–4 | Juan Cruz Abreu Coliseum (100); Manatí, PR |
| December 4, 2024; 6:30 pm, ESPN+ | | Milwaukee | W 66–50 | 5–4 (1–0) | Beeghly Center (1,343); Youngstown, OH |
| December 7, 2024; 1:00 pm, ESPN+ | | at Northern Kentucky | W 56–47 | 6–4 (2–0) | Truist Arena (1,295); Highland Heights, KY |
| December 14, 2024*; 11:00 am, B1G+ | | at No. 11 Ohio State | L 39–87 | 6–5 | Value City Arena (5,659); Columbus, OH |
| December 18, 2024; 6:30 pm, ESPN+ | | Detroit Mercy | L 58–65 | 6–6 (2–1) | Beeghly Center (1,205); Youngstown, OH |
| December 21, 2024*; 12:00 pm, ESPN+ | | Point Park | W 85–42 | 7–6 | Beeghly Center (1,296); Youngstown, OH |
| December 28, 2024; 2:00 pm, ESPN+ | | at IU Indy | L 50–65 | 7–7 (2–2) | The Jungle (241); Indianapolis, IN |
| January 1, 2025; 7:00 pm, ESPN+ | | at Purdue Fort Wayne | L 60–74 | 7–8 (2–3) | Gates Sports Center (474); Fort Wayne, IN |
| January 9, 2025; 6:30 pm, ESPN+ | | Green Bay | L 50–58 | 7–9 (2–4) | Beeghly Center (1,328); Youngstown, OH |
| January 12, 2025; 2:00 pm, ESPN+ | | at Wright State | L 62–77 | 7–10 (2–5) | Nutter Center (1,174); Fairborn, OH |
| January 15, 2025; 6:30 pm, ESPN+ | | Northern Kentucky | W 75–66 | 8–10 (3–5) | Beeghly Center (1,273); Youngstown, OH |
| January 18, 2025; 2:00 pm, ESPN+ | | Robert Morris | L 61–67 | 8–11 (3–6) | Beeghly Center (3,172); Youngstown, OH |
| January 23, 2025; 7:00 pm, ESPN+ | | at Cleveland State | L 53–67 | 8–12 (3–7) | Wolstein Center (519); Cleveland, OH |
| January 26, 2025; 2:00 pm, ESPN+ | | Oakland | W 73–56 | 9–12 (4–7) | Beeghly Center (1,888); Youngstown, OH |
| January 29, 2025; 6:30 pm, ESPN+ | | Purdue Fort Wayne | L 56–79 | 9–13 (4–8) | Beeghly Center (1,185); Youngstown, OH |
| February 6, 2025; 7:00 pm, ESPN+ | | at Green Bay | L 47–58 | 9–14 (4–9) | Kress Events Center (1,902); Green Bay, WI |
| February 8, 2025; 3:00 pm, ESPN+ | | at Milwaukee | L 56–61 | 9–15 (4–10) | Klotsche Center (606); Milwaukee, WI |
| February 13, 2025; 6:30 pm, ESPN+ | | Wright State | L 76–78 ^{OT} | 9–16 (4–11) | Beeghly Center (1,335); Youngstown, OH |
| February 15, 2025; 2:00 pm, ESPN+ | | IU Indy | L 68–73 | 9–17 (4–12) | Beeghly Center (1,491); Youngstown, OH |
| February 20, 2025; 7:00 pm, ESPN+ | | at Detroit Mercy | W 67–59 | 10–17 (5–12) | Calihan Hall (325); Detroit, MI |
| February 22, 2025; 2:00 pm, ESPN+ | | at Oakland | W 52–51 | 11–17 (6–12) | OU Credit Union O'rena (521); Auburn Hills, MI |
| February 26, 2025; 7:00 pm, ESPN+ | | at Robert Morris | L 53–76 | 11–18 (6–13) | UPMC Events Center (412); Moon Township, PA |
| March 1, 2025; 2:00 pm, ESPN+ | | Cleveland State | W 73–70 | 12–18 (7–13) | Beeghly Center (1,421); Youngstown, OH |
Horizon League tournament
| March 4, 2025; 5:30 pm, ESPN+ | (9) | at (8) Wright State; First Round | L 58–73 | 12–19 | Nutter Center (943); Fairborn, OH |
*Non-conference game. ^{#}Rankings from AP Poll. (#) Tournament seedings in parentheses. All times are in Eastern.
