= 2025 Horizon League women's basketball tournament =

American college basketball postseason tournament

- Classification: Division I
- Season: 2024–25
- Teams: 11
- Site: Campus sites (First Round and Quarterfinals); Corteva Coliseum; Indianapolis, Indiana (Semifinals and Finals)
- Champions: Green Bay (18th title)
- Winning coach: Kayla Karius (1st title)
- MVP: Natalie McNeal (Green Bay)
- Television: ESPN+, ESPN2,

2024–25 Horizon League women's basketball standings
	Conf.				Overall
Team	W		L	PCT	W		L	PCT
Green Bay †	19	–	1	.950	29	–	6	.829
Purdue Fort Wayne	18	–	2	.900	27	–	9	.750
Cleveland State	14	–	6	.700	27	–	10	.730
Robert Morris	10	–	10	.500	15	–	16	.484
Northern Kentucky	8	–	12	.400	11	–	21	.344
Detroit Mercy	8	–	12	.400	15	–	15	.500
IU Indy	8	–	12	.400	9	–	21	.300
Wright State	7	–	13	.350	10	–	22	.313
Youngstown State	7	–	13	.350	12	–	19	.387
Oakland	6	–	14	.300	9	–	22	.290
Milwaukee	5	–	15	.250	8	–	24	.250
† 2025 Horizon League tournament winner

The 2025 Horizon League Women's Basketball Tournament was the final event of the 2024–25 women's basketball season for the Horizon League. It was held from March 4–11, 2025; first-round and quarterfinal games were played at the home courts of the higher seeds, with all remaining games played at Corteva Coliseum in Indianapolis. The winner will receive the conference's automatic berth into the NCAA Tournament. The tournament is sponsored by Barbasol for the third consecutive year.

== Seeds ==
All of the teams in the conference will participate in the tournament, with the top five teams receiving byes to the quarterfinals. The bracket is reset after each round so that the lowest remaining seed always plays the highest.

Seed	School	Conf	Tiebreaker
1	Green Bay	19–1	
2	Purdue Fort Wayne	18–2	
3	Cleveland State	14–6	
4	Robert Morris	10–10	
5	Northern Kentucky	8–12	3–1 vs. Detroit Mercy/IU Indy
6	Detroit Mercy	8–12	2–2 vs. NKU/IU Indy
7	IU Indy	8–12	1–3 vs. NKU/Detroit Mercy
8	Wright State	7–13	2–0 vs. Youngstown State
9	Youngstown State	7–13	0–2 vs. Wright State
10	Oakland	6–14	
11	Milwaukee	5–15	

== Schedule ==
Game	Time	Matchup	Score	Television
First Round – Tuesday, March 4
1	7:00 pm	No. 11 Milwaukee at No. 6 Detroit Mercy	62–73	ESPN+
2	7:00 pm	No. 10 Oakland at No. 7 IU Indy	62–56	ESPN+
3	5:30 pm	No. 9 Youngstown State at No. 8 Wright State	58–73	ESPN+
Quarterfinals – Thursday, March 6
4	8:00 pm	No. 10 Oakland at No. 1 Green Bay	55–84	ESPN+
5	7:00 pm	No. 8 Wright State at No. 2 Purdue Fort Wayne	50–64	ESPN+
6	5:30 pm	No. 6 Detroit Mercy at No. 3 Cleveland State	61–92	ESPN+
7	5:30 pm	No. 5 Northern Kentucky at No. 4 Robert Morris	57–70	ESPN+
Semifinals – Monday, March 10 at Corteva Coliseum, Indianapolis, IN
8	12:00 pm	No. 1 Green Bay vs. No. 4 Robert Morris	67–53	ESPN+
9	2:30 pm	No. 2 Purdue Fort Wayne vs. No. 3 Cleveland State	83–65	ESPN+
Championship – Tuesday, March 11 at Corteva Coliseum, Indianapolis, IN
10	12:00 pm	No. 1 Green Bay vs. No. 2 Purdue Fort Wayne	76–63	ESPN2
First round and quarterfinals game times are local. Semifinals and championship game times are in EDT. Rankings denote tournament seed.

== Bracket ==
First round Tuesday, March 4
8	Wright State	73
9	Youngstown State	58
7	IU Indy	56
10	Oakland	62
6	Detroit Mercy	73
11	Milwaukee	62

Quarterfinals; Thursday, March 6
1	Green Bay	84
10	Oakland	55
4	Robert Morris	70
5	Northern Kentucky	57
2	Purdue Fort Wayne	64
8	Wright State	50
3	Cleveland State	92
6	Detroit Mercy	61

Semifinals; Monday, March 10
1	Green Bay	67
4	Robert Morris	53
2	Purdue Fort Wayne	83
3	Cleveland State	65

Championship; Tuesday, March 11
1	Green Bay	76
2	Purdue Fort Wayne	63
