= 2024–25 Northern Kentucky Norse women's basketball team =

American college basketball season

2024–25 Northern Kentucky Norse women's basketball
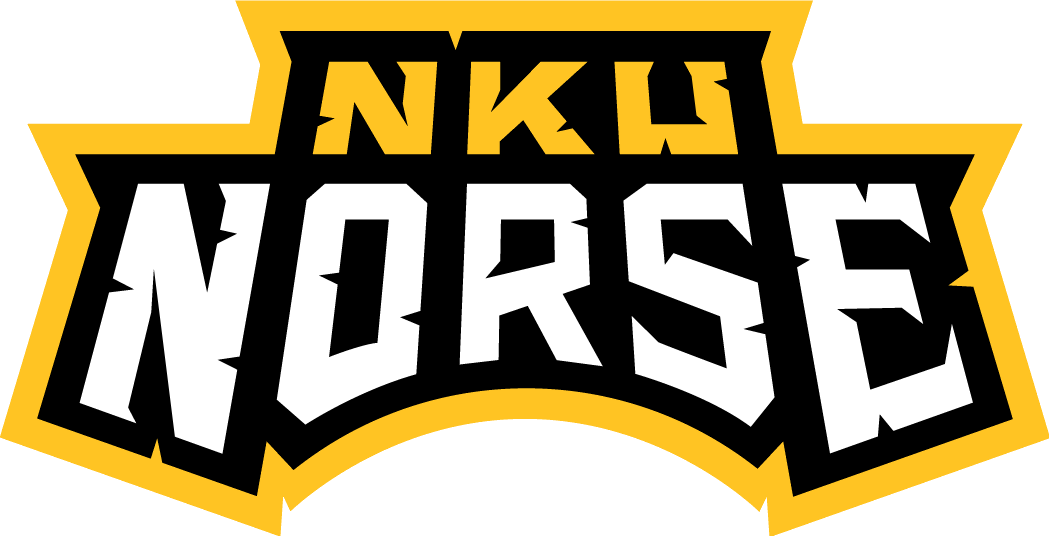
- Conference: Horizon League
- Record: 11–20 (8–12 Horizon)
- Head coach: Jeff Hans (1st season)
- Assistant coaches: Molly Bateman; Gabby Johnson; Brenden Stowers
- Home arena: Truist Arena

2024–25 Horizon League women's basketball standings
	Conf.				Overall
Team	W		L	PCT	W		L	PCT
Green Bay †	19	–	1	.950	29	–	6	.829
Purdue Fort Wayne	18	–	2	.900	27	–	9	.750
Cleveland State	14	–	6	.700	27	–	10	.730
Robert Morris	10	–	10	.500	15	–	16	.484
Northern Kentucky	8	–	12	.400	11	–	21	.344
Detroit Mercy	8	–	12	.400	15	–	15	.500
IU Indy	8	–	12	.400	9	–	21	.300
Wright State	7	–	13	.350	10	–	22	.313
Youngstown State	7	–	13	.350	12	–	19	.387
Oakland	6	–	14	.300	9	–	22	.290
Milwaukee	5	–	15	.250	8	–	24	.250
† 2025 Horizon League tournament winner

The 2024–25 Northern Kentucky Norse women's basketball team represented Northern Kentucky University during the 2024–25 NCAA Division I women's basketball season. The Norse, led by first-year head coach Jeff Hans, played their home games at Truist Arena in Highland Heights, Kentucky as members of the Horizon League.

== Previous season ==
The Norse finished the 2023–24 season 9–18, 7–11 in Horizon League play, to finish in a tie for eighth place. They would defeat Oakland, before falling to top-seeded Cleveland State in the quarterfinals of the Horizon League tournament.

On April 5, 2024, the school announced that they would be parting ways with head coach Camryn Volz, ending her eight-year tenure with the team. On April 22, the school announced that they would be hiring Thomas More head coach Jeff Hans as their new head coach.

== Roster ==
2024–25 Northern Kentucky Norse women's basketball team
Players
Coaches

Pos.	#	Name	Height	Year	Previous school	Hometown
G	1	Allison Basye	5 ft 11 in (1.8 m)	Jr	Huntington High School	Chillicothe, Ohio
G	2	Kalissa Lacy	5 ft 9 in (1.75 m)	Sr	Eastern Kentucky	Charleston, West Virginia
G	3	Kailee Davis	5 ft 2 in (1.57 m)	Sr	Renaissance High School	Detroit, Michigan
F	4	Paige Hodgson	6 ft 4 in (1.93 m)	Sr	Beaver Dam High School	Beaver Dam, Wisconsin
G	5	Mya Meredith	5 ft 11 in (1.8 m)	Sr	Western Kentucky	Newport, Kentucky
G	11	Kamora Morgan	6 ft 0 in (1.83 m)	Fr	Fort Erie International Academy	Oshawa, Ontario
G	12	Anna Hamilton	5 ft 5 in (1.65 m)	Fr	Conner High School	Hebron, Kentucky
F	14	Abby Wolterman	6 ft 0 in (1.83 m)	Jr	IU Indy	West Chester, Ohio
G	20	Macey Blevins	5 ft 10 in (1.78 m)	Sr	Western Kentucky	Monticello, Kentucky
G	21	Jaci Jones	5 ft 5 in (1.65 m)	GS	IU Indy	Fort Wayne, Indiana
G	22	Noelle Hubert	5 ft 11 in (1.8 m)	So	Notre Dame Academy	Burlington, Kentucky
G	24	Madison French	5 ft 11 in (1.8 m)	So	Lakota East High School	Liberty Township, Ohio
G	31	Sydney Martin	5 ft 10 in (1.78 m)	Fr	Pulaski County High School	Somerset, Kentucky
F	33	Gabby Razzano	6 ft 2 in (1.88 m)	So	Mason High School	Mason, Ohio
G/F	35	Halle Idowu	5 ft 11 in (1.8 m)	GS	Northeastern	Calumet Park, Illinois

Head coach

- Jeff Hans (Wilmington (OH))

Assistant coach(es)

- Molly Bateman (Defiance)
- Gabby Johnson (Thomas More)
- Brenden Stowers (Northern Kentucky)

Legend

- (C) Team captain
- (S) Suspended
- (I) Ineligible
- (W) Walk-on
- Injured
- Current redshirt

Roster
Last update: February 8, 2025

== Schedule and results ==
Date time, TV	Rank^{#}	Opponent^{#}	Result	Record	Site (attendance) city, state
Regular season
November 4, 2024*; 6:00 pm, ESPN+		Middle Tennessee	L 58–79	0–1	Truist Arena (1,264); Highland Heights, KY
November 7, 2024*; 6:00 pm, SECN+		at No. 22 Kentucky	L 41–70	0–2	Memorial Coliseum (4,188); Lexington, KY
November 10, 2024*; 1:00 pm, ESPN+		at Marshall	W 80–78	1–2	Cam Henderson Center (1,245); Huntington, WV
November 15, 2024*; 6:00 pm, ESPN+		Cedarville	W 81–67	2–2	Truist Arena (1,193); Highland Heights, KY
November 17, 2024*; 2:00 pm, ESPN+		at Toledo	L 73–76	2–3	Savage Arena (4,023); Toledo, OH
November 23, 2024*; 4:00 pm, ESPN+		at Southern Indiana	L 73–75	2–4	Liberty Arena (869); Evansville, IN
November 27, 2024*; 3:00 pm, ESPN+		at Bradley	L 57–62	2–5	Renaissance Coliseum (501); Peoria, IL
November 30, 2024*; 3:30 pm, ESPN+		Eastern Kentucky	L 75–84	2–6	Truist Arena (1,148); Highland Heights, KY
December 4, 2024; 7:00 pm, ESPN+		at Cleveland State	L 54–67	2–7 (0–1)	Wolstein Center (265); Cleveland, OH
December 7, 2024; 1:00 pm, ESPN+		Youngstown State	L 47–56	2–8 (0–2)	Truist Arena (1,295); Highland Heights, KY
December 15, 2024*; 3:30 pm, ESPN+		Ball State	L 51–77	2–9	Truist Arena (2,124); Highland Heights, KY
December 19, 2024*; 5:00 pm, ESPN+		at UC San Diego; UC San Diego Classic	W 58–50	3–9	LionTree Arena (335); La Jolla, CA
December 20, 2024*; 5:00 pm		vs. La Salle; UC San Diego Classic	L 67–70	3–10	LionTree Arena (135); La Jolla, CA
December 29, 2024; 1:00 pm, ESPN+/FDSNOH		Oakland	L 85–86 ^{OT}	3–11 (0–3)	Truist Arena (1,664); Highland Heights, KY
January 2, 2025; 7:00 pm, ESPN+		at Green Bay	L 59–78	3–12 (0–4)	Kress Events Center (1,750); Green Bay, WI
January 4, 2025; 3:00 pm, ESPN+		at Milwaukee	W 68–65	4–12 (1–4)	Klotsche Center (628); Milwaukee, WI
January 8, 2025; 6:00 pm, ESPN+		Robert Morris	W 72–58	5–12 (2–4)	Truist Arena (1,429); Highland Heights, KY
January 11, 2025; 3:30 pm, ESPN+/FDSNOH		IU Indy	W 80–63	6–12 (3–4)	Truist Arena (1,093); Highland Heights, KY
January 15, 2025; 6:30 pm, ESPN+		at Youngstown State	L 66–75	6–13 (3–5)	Beeghly Center (1,273); Youngstown, OH
January 18, 2025; 2:00 pm, ESPN+		at Purdue Fort Wayne	L 52–76	6–14 (3–6)	Gates Sports Center (716); Fort Wayne, IN
January 23, 2025; 6:00 pm, ESPN+		Milwaukee	W 66–62	7–14 (4–6)	Truist Arena (1,277); Highland Heights, KY
January 25, 2025; 1:00 pm, ESPN+		Green Bay	L 56–64	7–15 (4–7)	Truist Arena (1,380); Highland Heights, KY
January 29, 2025; 6:00 pm, ESPN+		Detroit Mercy	W 79–49	8–15 (5–7)	Truist Arena (1,320); Highland Heights, KY
February 1, 2025; 2:00 pm, ESPN+		at Wright State	L 67–75	8–16 (5–8)	Nutter Center (1,105); Fairborn, OH
February 8, 2025; 2:00 pm, ESPN+		at IU Indy	W 82–79	9–16 (6–8)	The Jungle (554); Indianapolis, IN
February 12, 2025; 6:00 pm, ESPN+		Cleveland State	W 72–69	10–16 (7–8)	Truist Arena (1,310); Highland Heights, KY
February 16, 2025; 2:00 pm, ESPN+		at Robert Morris	L 59–63	10–17 (7–9)	UPMC Events Center (321); Moon Township, PA
February 20, 2025; 6:00 pm, ESPN+		Purdue Fort Wayne	L 57–69	10–18 (7–10)	Truist Arena (1,425); Highland Heights, KY
February 22, 2025; 1:00 pm, ESPN+		Wright State	L 62–68	10–19 (7–11)	Truist Arena (1,751); Highland Heights, KY
February 27, 2025; 7:00 pm, ESPN+		at Detroit Mercy	L 75–81	10–20 (7–12)	Calihan Hall (351); Detroit, MI
March 1, 2025; 2:00 pm, ESPN+		at Oakland	W 61–58	11–20 (8–12)	OU Credit Union O'rena (505); Auburn Hills, MI
Horizon League tournament
March 6, 2025; 5:30 pm, ESPN+	(5)	at (4) Robert Morris; Quarterfinals	L 57–70	11–21	UPMC Events Center (748); Moon Township, PA
*Non-conference game. ^{#}Rankings from AP Poll. (#) Tournament seedings in parentheses. All times are in Eastern.
