= 2024–25 IU Indy Jaguars women's basketball team =

American college basketball season

2024–25 IU Indy Jaguars women's basketball
- Conference: Horizon League
- Record: 9–21 (8–12 Horizon)
- Head coach: Kate Bruce (3rd season)
- Assistant coaches: Johnny Montello; Kortney Dunbar; Hannah Blake
- Home arena: The Jungle

2024–25 Horizon League women's basketball standings
	Conf.				Overall
Team	W		L	PCT	W		L	PCT
Green Bay †	19	–	1	.950	29	–	6	.829
Purdue Fort Wayne	18	–	2	.900	27	–	9	.750
Cleveland State	14	–	6	.700	27	–	10	.730
Robert Morris	10	–	10	.500	15	–	16	.484
Northern Kentucky	8	–	12	.400	11	–	21	.344
Detroit Mercy	8	–	12	.400	15	–	15	.500
IU Indy	8	–	12	.400	9	–	21	.300
Wright State	7	–	13	.350	10	–	22	.313
Youngstown State	7	–	13	.350	12	–	19	.387
Oakland	6	–	14	.300	9	–	22	.290
Milwaukee	5	–	15	.250	8	–	24	.250
† 2025 Horizon League tournament winner

The 2024–25 IU Indy Jaguars women's basketball team represented Indiana University Indianapolis during the 2024–25 NCAA Division I women's basketball season. The Jaguars, led by third-year head coach Kate Bruce, played their home games at The Jungle in Indianapolis, Indiana as members of the Horizon League.

This is the first season for the institution following the dissolution of Indiana University–Purdue University Indianapolis, with the athletic program being transferred to the new IU Indianapolis campus, adopting the athletic branding of IU Indy.

== Previous season ==
The Jaguars finished the 2023–24 season 7–23, 5–15 in Horizon League play, to finish in tenth place. They were defeated by Youngstown State in the first round of the Horizon League tournament.

== Roster ==
2024–25 IU Indy Jaguars women's basketball team
Players
Coaches

Pos.	#	Name	Height	Year	Previous school	Hometown
F	00	Faith Stinson	6 ft 2 in (1.88 m)	Jr	Akron	Thornville, Ohio
G/F	1	Destini Craig	5 ft 10 in (1.78 m)	Fr	Northrop High School	Fort Wayne, Indiana
G	3	Shania Nichols-Vannett	5 ft 7 in (1.7 m)	So	North Dakota State College of Science	Saint Paul, Minnesota
F	4	Alexa Hocevar	6 ft 1 in (1.85 m)	So	West Geauga High School	Willoughby Hills, Ohio
G	5	Camron Blank	5 ft 9 in (1.75 m)	Sr	Rock Valley College	Rockford, Illinois
G/F	10	Denali Craig-Edwards	6 ft 1 in (1.85 m)	So	Western Michigan	Peoria, Illinois
G	11	Azyah Newson-Cole	5 ft 7 in (1.7 m)	RS Fr	Lincoln-Way Central High School	Matteson, Illinois
G/F	12	Katie Davidson	5 ft 10 in (1.78 m)	Sr	Miami (OH)	Indianapolis, Indiana
G	13	Logan Lewis	5 ft 7 in (1.7 m)	Sr	West Bloomfield High School	West Bloomfield, Michigan
G	14	Nevaeh Foster	5 ft 8 in (1.73 m)	So	Western Kentucky	South Bend, Indiana
G	23	Kaylin Moorehead	5 ft 6 in (1.68 m)	RS Fr	Westfield Prep	Redford, Michigan
F	24	Jada Patton	5 ft 11 in (1.8 m)	Jr	UIndy	Granger, Indiana
F	25	Tamori Plantin	6 ft 1 in (1.85 m)	Jr	Western Carolina	Buford, Georgia
G	55	Kendall Wingler	5 ft 10 in (1.78 m)	GS	Butler	Ekron, Kentucky

Head coach

- Kate Bruce (Florida Gulf Coast)

Assistant coach(es)

- Johnny Montello (Hiram)
- Kortney Dunbar (Tennessee)
- Hannah Blake (Walsh)

Legend

- (C) Team captain
- (S) Suspended
- (I) Ineligible
- (W) Walk-on
- Injured
- Current redshirt

Roster
Last update: February 11, 2025

== Schedule and results ==
Date time, TV	Rank^{#}	Opponent^{#}	Result	Record	High points	High rebounds	High assists	Site (attendance) city, state
Regular season
November 5, 2024*; 6:30 pm, ESPN+		Evansville	W 101–76	1–0	23 – Foster	5 – Stinson	5 – Davidson	The Jungle (706); Indianapolis, IN
November 8, 2024*; 7:00 pm, ESPN+		at Ball State	L 63–89	1–1	14 – Patton	6 – Hocevar	4 – Nichols-Vannett	Worthen Arena (4,018); Muncie, IN
November 14, 2024*; 7:30 pm, B1G+		at Purdue	L 64–83	1–2	14 – Stinson	4 – tied	2 – tied	Mackey Arena (3,432); West Lafayette, IN
November 16, 2024*; 5:00 pm, ESPN+		Southern Illinois	L 80–85	1–3	37 – Nichols-Vannett	7 – Foster	2 – tied	The Jungle (531); Indianapolis, IN
November 21, 2024*; 12:00 pm, ESPN+		at Bradley	L 47–72	1–4	10 – Hocevar	7 – Patton	3 – Patton	Renaissance Coliseum; Peoria, IL
November 24, 2024*; 1:00 pm, FloHoops		at Marquette	L 50–83	1–5	13 – Newson-Cole	9 – Hocevar	3 – Lewis	Al McGuire Center (1,502); Milwaukee, WI
November 27, 2024*; 2:00 pm, ESPN+		at Eastern Illinois	L 49–66	1–6	17 – Patton	6 – Nichols-Vannett	4 – Newson-Cole	Groniger Arena (271); Charleston, IL
December 4, 2024; 7:00 pm, ESPN+		at Green Bay	L 56–78	1–7 (0–1)	15 – Patton	6 – Stinson	3 – Newson-Cole	Kress Events Center (1,640); Green Bay, WI
December 7, 2024; 2:00 pm, ESPN+		at Cleveland State	L 49–82	1–8 (0–2)	12 – Hocevar	4 – tied	4 – Stinson	Wolstein Center (243); Cleveland, OH
December 11, 2024; 6:30 pm, ESPN+		Purdue Fort Wayne	L 71–79	1–9 (0–3)	24 – Nichols-Vannett	6 – Hocevar	6 – tied	The Jungle (377); Indianapolis, IN
December 20, 2024*; 1:00 pm		vs. East Tennessee State; FGCU Holiday Classic	L 41–54	1–10	14 – Foster	9 – Foster	3 – Newson-Cole	Alico Arena; Fort Myers, FL
December 21, 2024*; 1:00 pm		vs. North Carolina A&T; FGCU Holiday Classic	L 53–62	1–11	17 – Foster	8 – Stinson	2 – tied	Alico Arena (107); Fort Myers, FL
December 28, 2024; 2:00 pm, ESPN+		Youngstown State	W 65–50	2–11 (1–3)	22 – Stinson	8 – tied	3 – Foster	The Jungle (241); Indianapolis, IN
January 1, 2025; 7:00 pm, ESPN+		at Detroit Mercy	L 59–67	2–12 (1–4)	17 – Foster	8 – Hocevar	4 – Patton	Calihan Hall (601); Detroit, MI
January 4, 2025; 2:00 pm, ESPN+		Robert Morris	W 56–46	3–12 (2–4)	13 – tied	12 – Stinson	2 – tied	The Jungle (458); Indianapolis, IN
January 8, 2025; 7:00 pm, ESPN+		at Oakland	W 79–73	4–12 (3–4)	23 – Davidson	7 – tied	6 – Newson-Cole	OU Credit Union O'rena (401); Auburn Hills, MI
January 11, 2025; 3:30 pm, ESPN+		at Northern Kentucky	L 63–80	4–13 (3–5)	16 – Davidson	9 – Stinson	3 – tied	Truist Arena (1,093); Highland Heights, KY
January 15, 2025; 6:30 pm, ESPN+		Wright State	W 75–63	5–13 (4–5)	17 – tied	6 – Nichols-Vannett	5 – Patton	The Jungle (496); Indianapolis, IN
January 18, 2025; 2:00 pm, ESPN+		Cleveland State	L 39–61	5–14 (4–6)	16 – Davidson	5 – tied	2 – Hocevar	The Jungle (569); Indianapolis, IN
January 25, 2025; 2:00 pm, ESPN+		at Purdue Fort Wayne	L 55–82	5–15 (4–7)	27 – Davidson	7 – Stinson	3 – Nichols-Vannett	Gates Sports Center (589); Fort Wayne, IN
January 29, 2025; 6:30 pm, ESPN+		Milwaukee	L 62–66	5–16 (4–8)	24 – Davidson	4 – tied	5 – Nichols-Vannett	The Jungle (467); Indianapolis, IN
February 2, 2025; 2:00 pm, ESPN+		Green Bay	L 54–76	5–17 (4–9)	12 – Stinson	6 – tied	4 – Hocevar	The Jungle (595); Indianapolis, IN
February 5, 2025; 7:00 pm, ESPN+		at Wright State	W 80–68	6–17 (5–9)	28 – Davidson	7 – tied	4 – tied	Nutter Center (1,106); Fairborn, OH
February 8, 2025; 2:00 pm, ESPN+		Northern Kentucky	L 79–82	6–18 (5–10)	31 – Davidson	7 – Stinson	5 – Foster	The Jungle (554); Indianapolis, IN
February 13, 2025; 7:00 pm, ESPN+		at Robert Morris	L 58–61	6–19 (5–11)	15 – Davidson	6 – Newson-Cole	4 – Hocevar	UPMC Events Center (226); Moon Township, PA
February 15, 2025; 2:00 pm, ESPN+		at Youngstown State	W 73–68	7–19 (6–11)	29 – Davidson	9 – Davidson	4 – tied	Beeghly Center (1,491); Youngstown, OH
February 19, 2025; 7:00 pm, ESPN+		at Milwaukee	L 70–77	7–20 (6–12)	24 – Davidson	6 – tied	4 – tied	Klotsche Center (427); Milwaukee, WI
February 26, 2025; 6:30 pm, ESPN+		Oakland	W 80–65	8–20 (7–12)	19 – Hocevar	9 – Stinson	4 – Nichols-Vannett	The Jungle (431); Indianapolis, IN
March 1, 2025; 12:00 pm, ESPN+		Detroit Mercy	W 74–67	9–20 (8–12)	30 – Davidson	7 – Davidson	4 – Newson-Cole	Corteva Coliseum (472); Indianapolis, IN
Horizon League tournament
March 4, 2025; 7:00 pm, ESPN+	(7)	(10) Oakland; First Round	L 56–62	9–21	21 – Davidson	9 – Hocevar	3 – Davidson	The Jungle (498); Indianapolis, IN
*Non-conference game. ^{#}Rankings from AP poll. (#) Tournament seedings in parentheses. All times are in Eastern.
