= 2024–25 Oakland Golden Grizzlies women's basketball team =

American college basketball season

2024–25 Oakland Golden Grizzlies women's basketball
- Conference: Horizon League
- Record: 8–15 (6–8 Horizon)
- Head coach: Jeff Tungate (12th season; first 9 games); Deanna Richard (since December 9, 2024)
- Assistant coaches: Crystal Davis; Tim Webb; Porter Westfall
- Home arena: OU Credit Union O'rena

2024–25 Horizon League women's basketball standings
	Conf.				Overall
Team	W		L	PCT	W		L	PCT
Green Bay †	19	–	1	.950	29	–	6	.829
Purdue Fort Wayne	18	–	2	.900	27	–	9	.750
Cleveland State	14	–	6	.700	27	–	10	.730
Robert Morris	10	–	10	.500	15	–	16	.484
Northern Kentucky	8	–	12	.400	11	–	21	.344
Detroit Mercy	8	–	12	.400	15	–	15	.500
IU Indy	8	–	12	.400	9	–	21	.300
Wright State	7	–	13	.350	10	–	22	.313
Youngstown State	7	–	13	.350	12	–	19	.387
Oakland	6	–	14	.300	9	–	22	.290
Milwaukee	5	–	15	.250	8	–	24	.250
† 2025 Horizon League tournament winner

The 2024–25 Oakland Golden Grizzlies women's basketball team represented Oakland University during the 2024–25 NCAA Division I women's basketball season. The Golden Grizzlies, led by interim head coach Deanna Richard, played their home games at the OU Credit Union O'rena in Auburn Hills, Michigan as members of the Horizon League.

After coaching the first nine games of the season, on December 9, 2024, head coach Jeff Tungate announced that he would be retiring, effective immediately, after undergoing numerous back and neck injuries, with associate head coach Deanna Richard being named interim head coach for the remainder of the season.

== Previous season ==
The Golden Grizzlies finished the 2023–24 season 11–15, 7–11 in Horizon League play, to finish in a tie for eighth place. They were defeated by Northern Kentucky in the first round of the Horizon League tournament.

== Roster ==
2024–25 Oakland Golden Grizzlies women's basketball team
Players
Coaches

Pos.	#	Name	Height	Year	Previous school	Hometown
G	0	Naveyah Damon	6 ft 0 in (1.83 m)	So	Miami Country Day School	Miami, Florida
G	1	Jasmine Dupree-Hebert	5 ft 8 in (1.73 m)	So	Hopkins High School	Dayton, Minnesota
G	2	Maddy Skorupski	5 ft 8 in (1.73 m)	Jr	Michigan State	Clarkston, Michigan
G	3	Dani Grim	5 ft 7 in (1.7 m)	Sr	Mercyhurst	Columbus, Ohio
C	4	Sereniti Roberts-Adams	6 ft 3 in (1.91 m)	Fr	Butler College Prep	Chicago, Illinois
F	5	Kylie Buckley	6 ft 0 in (1.83 m)	So	Niagara	Livonia, New York
G	10	Maddy Rendall	6 ft 0 in (1.83 m)	RS Fr	Idaho State	Kennewick, Washington
G/F	11	Jaidyn Elam	5 ft 11 in (1.8 m)	Fr	Detroit Country Day School	Pontiac, Michigan
G	12	Macy Smith	5 ft 10 in (1.78 m)	Sr	Utah State	Minneapolis, Minnesota
F	13	Maya Mitchell	5 ft 11 in (1.8 m)	Jr	Rock Valley College	Shakopee, Minnesota
G	21	Madison Royal-Davis	5 ft 11 in (1.8 m)	Sr	Butler	Toledo, Ohio
G	22	Cali Denson	5 ft 8 in (1.73 m)	So	Eastern Michigan	Milwaukie, Oregon
C	23	Leah Bullard	6 ft 4 in (1.93 m)	Fr	Dr. Phillips High School	Tampa Bay, Florida
C	24	Lianna Baxter	6 ft 2 in (1.88 m)	Jr	Oconto High School	Marinette, Wisconsin
G	25	Riley Abney	5 ft 9 in (1.75 m)	Fr	Brandon High School	Ortonville, Michigan

Head coach

- Deanna Richard (interim) (Oakland)

Assistant coach(es)

- Crystal Davis (Berea)
- Tim Webb (Rochester Christian)
- Porter Westfall (Oakland)

Legend

- (C) Team captain
- (S) Suspended
- (I) Ineligible
- (W) Walk-on
- Injured
- Current redshirt

Roster
Last update: February 8, 2025

== Schedule and results ==
Date time, TV	Rank^{#}	Opponent^{#}	Result	Record	Site (attendance) city, state
Exhibition
October 26, 2024*; 3:00 pm, YouTube		at Rochester Christian	W 91–66	–	Garth Pleasant Arena (674); Rochester Hills, MI
Regular season
November 5, 2024*; 6:30 pm, B1G+		at Michigan State	L 42–107	0–1	Breslin Center (2,549); East Lansing, MI
November 8, 2024*; 11:00 am, ESPN+		Cleary	W 95–51	1–1	OU Credit Union O'rena; Auburn Hills, MI
November 12, 2024*; 6:00 pm, ESPN+		at Army	L 54–58	1–2	Christl Arena (462); West Point, NY
November 17, 2024*; 12:00 pm, B1G+		at Michigan	L 42–88	1–3	Crisler Center (2,643); Ann Arbor, MI
November 21, 2024*; 4:00 pm, ESPN+		St. Thomas	L 62–73	1–4	OU Credit Union O'rena (244); Auburn Hills, MI
November 24, 2024*; 1:00 pm, ESPN+		at Central Michigan	W 76–65	2–4	McGuirk Arena (1,042); Mount Pleasant, MI
November 29, 2024*; 11:00 am, Baller TV		vs. Richmond; Coast 2 Coast Classic	L 49–76	2–5	Ocean Center (75); Daytona Beach, FL
November 30, 2024*; 3:30 pm, Baller TV		vs. Old Dominion; Coast 2 Coast Classic	L 56–64	2–6	Ocean Center (115); Daytona Beach, FL
December 6, 2024; 7:00 pm, ESPN+		Wright State	W 84–70	3–6 (1–0)	OU Credit Union O'rena (629); Auburn Hills, MI
December 18, 2024; 7:00 pm, ESPN+		at Robert Morris	W 55–53	4–6 (2–0)	UPMC Events Center (249); Moon Township, PA
December 22, 2024*; 12:00 pm, B1G+		at Indiana	L 55–90	4–7	Simon Skjodt Assembly Hall (10,378); Bloomington, IN
December 29, 2024; 1:00 pm, ESPN+		at Northern Kentucky	W 86–85 ^{OT}	5–7 (3–0)	Truist Arena (1,664); Highland Heights, KY
January 3, 2025; 7:00 pm, ESPN+		Cleveland State	W 71–68	6–7 (4–0)	OU Credit Union O'rena (510); Auburn Hills, MI
January 5, 2025; 2:00 pm, ESPN+		Purdue Fort Wayne	L 37–77	6–8 (4–1)	OU Credit Union O'rena (507); Auburn Hills, MI
January 8, 2025; 7:00 pm, ESPN+		IU Indy	L 73–79	6–9 (4–2)	OU Credit Union O'rena (401); Auburn Hills, MI
January 11, 2025; 1:00 pm, ESPN+		at Detroit Mercy; Metro Series	L 59–67	6–10 (4–3)	Calihan Hall (757); Detroit, MI
January 16, 2025; 12:00 pm, ESPN+		at Milwaukee	W 75–72 ^{OT}	7–10 (5–3)	Klotsche Center (2,091); Milwaukee, WI
January 18, 2025; 2:00 pm, ESPN+		at Green Bay	L 39–69	7–11 (5–4)	Kress Events Center (1,969); Green Bay, WI
January 23, 2025; 7:00 pm, ESPN+		Robert Morris	L 63–73	7–12 (5–5)	OU Credit Union O'rena (704); Auburn Hills, MI
January 26, 2025; 2:00 pm, ESPN+		at Youngstown State	L 56–73	7–13 (5–6)	Beeghly Center (1,888); Youngstown, OH
February 1, 2025; 1:00 pm, ESPN+/WMYD		Detroit Mercy; Metro Series	W 77–63	8–13 (6–6)	OU Credit Union O'rena (841); Auburn Hills, MI
February 6, 2025; 7:00 pm, ESPN+		at Purdue Fort Wayne	L 46–75	8–14 (6–7)	Gates Sports Center (514); Fort Wayne, IN
February 8, 2025; 12:00 pm, ESPN+		at Cleveland State	L 58–79	8–15 (6–8)	Wolstein Center (317); Cleveland, OH
February 13, 2025; 7:00 pm, ESPN+/WMYD		Green Bay	L 39–75	8–16 (6–9)	OU Credit Union O'rena (273); Auburn Hills, MI
February 15, 2025; 2:00 pm, ESPN+		Milwaukee	L 49–61	8–17 (6–10)	OU Credit Union O'rena (522); Auburn Hills, MI
February 19, 2025; 7:00 pm, ESPN+		at Wright State	L 53–60	8–18 (6–11)	Nutter Center (1,094); Fairborn, OH
February 22, 2025; 2:00 pm, ESPN+		Youngstown State	L 51–52	8–19 (6–12)	OU Credit Union O'rena (521); Auburn Hills, MI
February 26, 2025; 6:30 pm, ESPN+		at IU Indy	L 65–80	8–20 (6–13)	The Jungle (431); Indianapolis, IN
March 1, 2025; 2:00 pm, ESPN+		Northern Kentucky	L 58–61	8–21 (6–14)	OU Credit Union O'rena (505); Auburn Hills, MI
Horizon League tournament
March 4, 2025; 7:00 pm, ESPN+	(10)	at IU Indy; First Round	W 62–56	9–21	The Jungle (498); Indianapolis, IN
March 6, 2025; 8:00 pm, ESPN+	(10)	at (1) Green Bay; Quarterfinals	L 55–84	9–22	Kress Events Center (2,273); Green Bay, WI
*Non-conference game. ^{#}Rankings from AP poll. (#) Tournament seedings in parentheses. All times are in Eastern.
