= 2024–25 Detroit Mercy Titans women's basketball team =

American college basketball season

2024–25 Detroit Mercy Titans women's basketball
- Conference: Horizon League
- Record: 15–15 (8–12 Horizon)
- Head coach: Kate Achter (3rd season)
- Associate head coach: Kiefer Haffey
- Assistant coaches: Juanita Cochran; Andrea Cecil; Antonio Capaldi
- Home arena: Calihan Hall

2024–25 Horizon League women's basketball standings
	Conf.				Overall
Team	W		L	PCT	W		L	PCT
Green Bay †	19	–	1	.950	29	–	6	.829
Purdue Fort Wayne	18	–	2	.900	27	–	9	.750
Cleveland State	14	–	6	.700	27	–	10	.730
Robert Morris	10	–	10	.500	15	–	16	.484
Northern Kentucky	8	–	12	.400	11	–	21	.344
Detroit Mercy	8	–	12	.400	15	–	15	.500
IU Indy	8	–	12	.400	9	–	21	.300
Wright State	7	–	13	.350	10	–	22	.313
Youngstown State	7	–	13	.350	12	–	19	.387
Oakland	6	–	14	.300	9	–	22	.290
Milwaukee	5	–	15	.250	8	–	24	.250
† 2025 Horizon League tournament winner

The 2024–25 Detroit Mercy Titans women's basketball team represented the University of Detroit Mercy during the 2024–25 NCAA Division I women's basketball season. The Titans, led by third-year head coach Kate Achter, played their home games at Calihan Hall in Detroit, Michigan as members of the Horizon League.

== Previous season ==
The Titans finished the 2023–24 season 17–16, 9–11 in Horizon League play, to finish in tie for sixth place. They defeated Robert Morris, before falling to Purdue Fort Wayne in the quarterfinals of the Horizon League tournament.

== Roster ==
2024–25 Detroit Mercy Titans women's basketball team
Players
Coaches

Pos.	#	Name	Height	Year	Previous school	Hometown
G	0	Emaia O'Brien	5 ft 1 in (1.55 m)	GS	LIU	Detroit, Michigan
G	1	Aaliyah McQueen (5Y)	5 ft 9 in (1.75 m)	Sr	Madonna	Flint, Michigan
G	2	Makayla Jackson	5 ft 8 in (1.73 m)	So	Bullis School	Alexandria, Virginia
G/F	3	Anna Lassan	5 ft 11 in (1.8 m)	Fr	South Lyon East High School	South Lyon, Michigan
G	4	Myonna Hooper	5 ft 5 in (1.65 m)	Jr	West Bloomfield High School	West Bloomfield, Michigan
G	5	Maya Anderson	5 ft 8 in (1.73 m)	Fr	Cass Tech	Detroit, Michigan
G	11	Alize Tripp	5 ft 6 in (1.68 m)	Sr	Spring Arbor	Jackson, Michigan
F	12	Maddie Diabate	5 ft 9 in (1.75 m)	Sr	Georgia Highlands	Paris, France
G	20	Kailey Starks	5 ft 7 in (1.7 m)	Fr	Evanston Township High School	Evanston, Illinois
F	21	Latifa Amzil	6 ft 0 in (1.83 m)	Sr	Chipola College	Helsinki, Finland
F	23	Jasmine Edwards	6 ft 0 in (1.83 m)	GS	Warner	Westland, Michigan
G	33	Katie Burton	5 ft 9 in (1.75 m)	Sr	Buffalo	Fishers, Indiana
F	34	Chanteese Craig	6 ft 2 in (1.88 m)	Sr	Buffalo	Fort Wayne, Indiana
F	41	Addisen Mastriano	6 ft 3 in (1.91 m)	Fr	Northeastern	Richmond, Indiana

Head coach

- Kate Achter (Bowling Green)

Assistant coach(es)

- Kiefer Haffey (Wayne State)
- Juanita Cochran (Wayne State)
- Andrea Cecil (Florida Gulf Coast)
- Antonio Capaldi (Madonna)

Legend

- (C) Team captain
- (S) Suspended
- (I) Ineligible
- (W) Walk-on
- (5Y) Fifth-year senior
- Injured
- Current redshirt

Roster
Last update: February 9, 2025

== Schedule and results ==
Date time, TV	Rank^{#}	Opponent^{#}	Result	Record	High points	High rebounds	High assists	Site (attendance) city, state
Regular season
November 8, 2024*; 7:00 pm, ESPN+		Bowling Green	W 73–66	1–0	24 – Hooper	12 – McQueen	4 – tied	Calihan Hall (437); Detroit, MI
November 16, 2024*; 1:00 pm, ESPN+		Bellarmine	W 73–71	2–0	16 – tied	11 – Edwards	2 – tied	Calihan Hall (749); Detroit, MI
November 20, 2024*; 6:30 pm, B1G+		at Michigan State	L 44–101	2–1	13 – Starks	6 – McQueen	2 – O'Brien	Breslin Center (2,812); East Lansing, MI
November 23, 2024*; 1:00 pm, ESPN+		Western Michigan	W 72–63	3–1	18 – O'Brien	8 – Edwards	3 – Hooper	Calihan Hall (411); Detroit, MI
November 26, 2024*; 7:00 pm, ESPN+		Eastern Michigan	W 72–61	4–1	19 – McQueen	8 – McQueen	6 – Hooper	Calihan Hall (369); Detroit, MI
December 4, 2024; 7:00 pm, ESPN+		Wright State	W 67–56	5–1 (1–0)	18 – tied	7 – tied	3 – tied	Calihan Hall (309); Detroit, MI
December 8, 2024*; 1:00 pm, ESPN+		Cleary	W 81–55	6–1	22 – O'Brien	8 – Starks	6 – McQueen	Calihan Hall (240); Detroit, MI
December 14, 2024*; 3:00 pm, B1G+		at No. 20 Michigan	L 54–100	6–2	15 – McQueen	5 – Lassan	2 – O'Brien	Crisler Center (3,423); Ann Arbor, MI
December 18, 2024; 6:30 pm, ESPN+		at Youngstown State	W 65–58	7–2 (2–0)	24 – McQueen	9 – McQueen	4 – Hooper	Beeghly Center (1,205); Youngstown, OH
December 21, 2024*; 2:00 pm, ESPN+		at Valparaiso	W 79–71 ^{2OT}	8–2	30 – McQueen	11 – McQueen	5 – O'Brien	Athletics–Recreation Center (377); Valparaiso, IN
December 28, 2024; 2:00 pm, ESPN+		at Robert Morris	W 66–58	9–2 (3–0)	19 – O'Brien	8 – McQueen	2 – tied	UPMC Events Center (146); Moon Township, PA
January 1, 2025; 7:00 pm, ESPN+		IU Indy	W 67–59	10–2 (4–0)	19 – Hooper	9 – McQueen	2 – tied	Calihan Hall (601); Detroit, MI
January 5, 2025; 1:00 pm, ESPN+		Cleveland State	L 62–72	10–3 (4–1)	16 – McQueen	7 – McQueen	6 – Jackson	Calihan Hall (401); Detroit, MI
January 8, 2025; 7:00 pm, ESPN+		at Wright State	L 64–67	10–4 (4–2)	24 – McQueen	11 – McQueen	4 – O'Brien	Nutter Center (1,237); Fairborn, OH
January 11, 2025; 1:00 pm, ESPN+		Oakland; Metro Series	W 67–59	11–4 (5–2)	23 – O'Brien	17 – McQueen	4 – O'Brien	Calihan Hall (757); Detroit, MI
January 16, 2025; 7:00 pm, ESPN+		at Green Bay	L 47–70	11–5 (5–3)	15 – O'Brien	4 – tied	2 – tied	Kress Events Center (1,619); Green Bay, WI
January 18, 2025; 3:00 pm, ESPN+		at Milwaukee	W 54–52	12–5 (6–3)	18 – O'Brien	9 – Burton	6 – McQueen	Klotsche Center (637); Milwaukee, WI
January 22, 2025; 7:00 pm, ESPN+		Purdue Fort Wayne	L 65–72	12–6 (6–4)	21 – McQueen	11 – McQueen	3 – tied	Calihan Hall (405); Detroit, MI
January 25, 2025; 1:00 pm, ESPN+		Robert Morris	L 64–77	12–7 (6–5)	19 – O'Brien	6 – Starks	3 – O'Brien	Calihan Hall (333); Detroit, MI
January 29, 2025; 6:00 pm, ESPN+		at Northern Kentucky	L 49–79	12–8 (6–6)	11 – Starks	6 – Lassan	1 – tied	Truist Arena (1,320); Highland Heights, KY
February 1, 2025; 1:00 pm, ESPN+		at Oakland; Metro Series	L 63–77	12–9 (6–7)	19 – McQueen	7 – McQueen	4 – Hooper	OU Credit Union O'rena (841); Auburn Hills, MI
February 6, 2025; 11:00 am, ESPN+		at Cleveland State	L 55–72	12–10 (6–8)	25 – O'Brien	8 – Edwards	3 – tied	Wolstein Center (3,094); Cleveland, OH
February 13, 2025; 7:00 pm, ESPN+		Milwaukee	W 50–46	13–10 (7–8)	11 – Jackson	9 – McQueen	2 – tied	Calihan Hall (405); Detroit, MI
February 15, 2025; 1:00 pm, ESPN+		Green Bay	L 60–76	13–11 (7–9)	22 – O'Brien	5 – tied	3 – McQueen	Calihan Hall (303); Detroit, MI
February 20, 2025; 7:00 pm, ESPN+		Youngstown State	L 59–67	13–12 (7–10)	15 – O'Brien	15 – McQueen	3 – Jackson	Calihan Hall (325); Detroit, MI
February 23, 2025; 2:00 pm, ESPN+		at Purdue Fort Wayne	L 62–91	13–13 (7–11)	13 – tied	7 – McQueen	2 – Hooper	Gates Sports Center (717); Fort Wayne, IN
February 27, 2025; 7:00 pm, ESPN+		Northern Kentucky	W 81–75	14–13 (8–11)	23 – McQueen	8 – McQueen	4 – tied	Calihan Hall (351); Detroit, MI
March 1, 2025; 12:00 pm, ESPN+		at IU Indy	L 67–74	14–14 (8–12)	17 – Burton	10 – Burton	3 – O'Brien	The Jungle (472); Indianapolis, IN
Horizon League tournament
March 4, 2025; 7:00 pm, ESPN+	(6)	(11) Milwaukee; First Round	W 73–62	15–14	25 – Jackson	8 – Starks	5 – O'Brien	Calihan Hall (227); Detroit, MI
March 6, 2025; 5:30 pm, ESPN+	(6)	at (3) Cleveland State; Quarterfinals	L 61–92	15–15	22 – O'Brien	5 – McQueen	3 – McQueen	Wolstein Center (588); Cleveland, OH
*Non-conference game. ^{#}Rankings from AP poll. (#) Tournament seedings in parentheses. All times are in Eastern.
