= 2024–25 Cleveland State Vikings women's basketball team =

American college basketball season

2024–25 Cleveland State Vikings women's basketball

WNIT, Fab 4
- Conference: Horizon League
- Record: 27–10 (14–6 Horizon)
- Head coach: Chris Kielsmeier (7th season)
- Assistant coaches: Bob Dunn; Emily Taylor; Chenara Wilson; Shelby Zoeckler
- Home arena: Wolstein Center

2024–25 Horizon League women's basketball standings
	Conf.				Overall
Team	W		L	PCT	W		L	PCT
Green Bay †	19	–	1	.950	29	–	6	.829
Purdue Fort Wayne	18	–	2	.900	27	–	9	.750
Cleveland State	14	–	6	.700	27	–	10	.730
Robert Morris	10	–	10	.500	15	–	16	.484
Northern Kentucky	8	–	12	.400	11	–	21	.344
Detroit Mercy	8	–	12	.400	15	–	15	.500
IU Indy	8	–	12	.400	9	–	21	.300
Wright State	7	–	13	.350	10	–	22	.313
Youngstown State	7	–	13	.350	12	–	19	.387
Oakland	6	–	14	.300	9	–	22	.290
Milwaukee	5	–	15	.250	8	–	24	.250
† 2025 Horizon League tournament winner

The 2024–25 Cleveland State Vikings women's basketball team represented Cleveland State University during the 2024–25 NCAA Division I women's basketball season. The Vikings, led by seventh-year head coach Chris Kielsmeier, played their home games at the Wolstein Center in Cleveland, Ohio as members of the Horizon League.

== Previous season ==
The Vikings finished the 2023–24 season 29–6, 18–2 in Horizon League play, to finish as Horizon League regular-season champions. They defeated Northern Kentucky and Wright State before falling to Green Bay in the Horizon League tournament championship game. They received an automatic bid to the WBIT, where they were defeated by Toledo in the first round.

== Roster ==
2024–25 Cleveland State Vikings women's basketball team
Players
Coaches

Pos.	#	Name	Height	Year	Previous school	Hometown
G	0	Mickayla Perdue	5 ft 7 in (1.7 m)	GS	Glenville State	Springfield, Ohio
G	2	Destiny Leo	5 ft 10 in (1.78 m)	GS	North High School	Willowick, Ohio
F	3	Brenae Jones-Grant	6 ft 1 in (1.85 m)	Fr	Immaculate Conception High School	Plainfield, New Jersey
F	4	Grace Ellis (5Y)	6 ft 0 in (1.83 m)	Sr	Wyoming	Brisbane, Australia
F	5	Kali Howard	5 ft 11 in (1.8 m)	Sr	Hutchinson Community College	Zachary, Louisiana
G	9	Sarah Hurley	6 ft 1 in (1.85 m)	Fr	Lincoln Prep	Pelham, Ontario
F	10	Jordana Reisma	6 ft 3 in (1.91 m)	Jr	Brown Deer High School	Brown Deer, Wisconsin
G	11	Colbi Maples	5 ft 8 in (1.73 m)	Sr	Grambling State	Earle, Arkansas
G	12	Sara Guerreiro	5 ft 10 in (1.78 m)	GS	South Florida	Seixal, Portugal
G	14	Filippa Goula	5 ft 7 in (1.7 m)	GS	Saint Francis (PA)	Ano Liosia, Greece
G	22	Jannah Eissa	5 ft 8 in (1.73 m)	So	NC State	Cairo, Egypt
F	24	Paulina Hernandez	6 ft 2 in (1.88 m)	So	Oak Creek High School	Oak Creek, Wisconsin
F	30	Macey Fegan	5 ft 11 in (1.8 m)	So	Toledo	Bentley, Michigan
F	44	Mya Moore	6 ft 2 in (1.88 m)	Jr	Seattle	Milwaukee, Wisconsin

Head coach

- Chris Kielsmeier (Iowa State)

Assistant coach(es)

- Bob Dunn (Dayton)
- Emily Taylor (John Carroll)
- Chenara Wilson (Cleveland State)
- Shelby Zoeckler (Cleveland State)

Legend

- (C) Team captain
- (S) Suspended
- (I) Ineligible
- (W) Walk-on
- (5Y) Fifth-year senior
- Injured
- Current redshirt

Roster
Last update: February 6, 2025

== Schedule and results ==
Date time, TV	Rank^{#}	Opponent^{#}	Result	Record	High points	High rebounds	High assists	Site (attendance) city, state
Exhibition
November 1, 2024*; 7:00 p.m.		Edinboro	W 74–60	–	–	–	–	Wolstein Center; Cleveland, OH
Regular season
November 5, 2024*; 6:00 p.m., ESPN+		at No. 14 Ohio State	L 69–104	0–1	29 – Perdue	7 – Guerreiro	3 – Maples	Value City Arena (4,828); Columbus, OH
November 9, 2024*; 5:30 p.m., NEC Front Row		at Chicago State	W 111–67	1–1	31 – Perdue	13 – Guerreiro	6 – Guerreiro	Jones Convocation Center (3,462); Chicago, IL
November 12, 2024*; 7:00 p.m., ESPN+		Bowling Green	W 75–68	2–1	19 – Guerreiro	9 – Guerreiro	5 – Guerreiro	Wolstein Center (411); Cleveland, OH
November 16, 2024*; 12:00 p.m., ESPN+		at Akron	L 74–85	2–2	25 – Perdue	8 – Reisma	7 – Perdue	James A. Rhodes Arena (518); Akron, OH
November 21, 2024*; 6:00 p.m., ESPN+		at Niagara	Canceled due to health concerns at Niagara					Gallagher Center; Lewiston, NY
November 23, 2024*; 3:30 p.m., ESPN+		Ohio Dominican	W 94–52	3–2	24 – Reisma	9 – Reisma	8 – Guerreiro	Wolstein Center (539); Cleveland, OH
November 29, 2024*; 12:00 p.m., YouTube		vs. Louisiana; Big Easy Classic	W 60–42	4–2	16 – Leo	11 – Reisma	4 – 2 tied	Alario Center (104); Westwego, LA
November 30, 2024*; 2:15 p.m., YouTube		vs. Lamar; Big Easy Classic	W 79–52	5–2	26 – Perdue	9 – Leo	7 – Guerreiro	Alario Center (127); Westwego, LA
December 4, 2024; 7:00 p.m., ESPN+		Northern Kentucky	W 67–54	6–2 (1–0)	18 – Reisma	16 – Guerreiro	5 – Guerreiro	Wolstein Center (265); Cleveland, OH
December 7, 2024; 2:00 p.m., ESPN+		IU Indy	W 82–49	7–2 (2–0)	27 – Perdue	7 – 3 tied	7 – Guerreiro	Wolstein Center (243); Cleveland, OH
December 13, 2024*; 7:00 p.m., ESPN+		Bethune–Cookman	W 78–59	8–2	25 – Reisma	10 – Leo	5 – Fegan	Woodling Gym (384); Cleveland, OH
December 16, 2024; 7:00 p.m., ESPN+		at Wright State	W 85–71	9–2 (3–0)	23 – Perdue	8 – Guerreiro	5 – Guerreiro	Nutter Center (1,318); Fairborn, OH
December 19, 2024*; 1:00 p.m.		vs. Morgan State; Puerto Rico Clasico	W 56–39	10–2	17 – Reisma	8 – Reisma	6 – Goula	Coliseo Rubén Rodríguez (100); Bayamón, Puerto Rico
December 21, 2024*; 10:30 a.m.		vs. Puerto Rico–Mayagüez; Puerto Rico Clasico	W 93–31	11–2	14 – Reisma	7 – Hernandez	7 – Goula	Coliseo Rubén Rodríguez (100); Bayamón, Puerto Rico
December 29, 2024; 12:00 p.m., ESPN+		Milwaukee	W 73–68 ^{OT}	12–2 (4–0)	21 – Perdue	13 – Guerreiro	5 – Guerreiro	Wolstein Center (321); Cleveland, OH
January 3, 2025; 7:00 p.m., ESPN+		at Oakland	L 68–71	12–3 (4–1)	18 – Guerreiro	7 – Guerreiro	6 – Fegan	OU Credit Union O'rena (510); Auburn Hills, MI
January 5, 2025; 1:00 p.m., ESPN+		at Detroit Mercy	W 72–62	13–3 (5–1)	26 – Perdue	6 – Moore	4 – Perdue	Calihan Hall (401); Detroit, MI
January 12, 2025; 2:00 p.m., ESPN+		Purdue Fort Wayne	L 75–78	13–4 (5–2)	25 – Reisma	9 – Guerreiro	9 – Guerreiro	Wolstein Center (322); Cleveland, OH
January 15, 2025; 11:00 a.m., ESPN+		at Robert Morris	W 74–53	14–4 (6–2)	32 – Perdue	10 – 2 tied	4 – Perdue	Up.m.C Events Center (873); Moon Township, PA
January 18, 2025; 2:00 p.m., ESPN+		at IU Indy	W 61–39	15–4 (7–2)	21 – Reisma	12 – Reisma	3 – 3 tied	The Jungle (569); Indianapolis, IN
January 23, 2025; 7:00 p.m., ESPN+		Youngstown State	W 67–53	16–4 (8–2)	18 – Guerreiro	12 – Guerreiro	7 – Guerreiro	Wolstein Center (519); Cleveland, OH
January 25, 2025*; 11:30 a.m., ESPN+		Ohio Christian	W 107–46	17–4	19 – Perdue	10 – Howard	6 – Goula	Wolstein Center (146); Cleveland, OH
January 30, 2025; 7:00 p.m., ESPN+		at Green Bay	L 52–66	17–5 (8–3)	17 – Perdue	7 – Moore	3 – 2 tied	Kress Events Center (2,177); Green Bay, WI
February 1, 2025; 3:00 p.m., ESPN+		at Milwaukee	W 89–81	18–5 (9–3)	30 – Perdue	7 – Ellis	4 – Ellis	Klotsche Center (600); Milwaukee, WI
February 6, 2025; 11:00 a.m., ESPN+		Detroit Mercy	W 72–55	19–5 (10–3)	21 – Reisma	10 – Guerreiro	5 – Perdue	Wolstein Center (3,094); Cleveland, OH
February 8, 2025; 12:00 p.m., ESPN+		Oakland	W 79–58	20–5 (11–3)	20 – Leo	6 – Guerreiro	8 – Guerreiro	Wolstein Center (317); Cleveland, OH
February 12, 2025; 6:00 p.m., ESPN+		at Northern Kentucky	L 69–72	20–6 (11–4)	20 – Perdue	12 – Guerreiro	5 – Guerreiro	Truist Arena (1,310); Highland Heights, KY
February 15, 2025; 2:00 p.m., ESPN+		at Purdue Fort Wayne	W 61–52	21–6 (12–4)	22 – Perdue	11 – Guerreiro	3 – Guerreiro	Gates Sports Center (748); Fort Wayne, IN
February 19, 2025; 7:00 p.m., ESPN+		Green Bay	L 50–59	21–7 (12–5)	19 – Reisma	9 – Reisma	5 – Perdue	Wolstein Center (508); Cleveland, OH
February 22, 2025; 2:00 p.m., ESPN+		Robert Morris	W 85–53	22–7 (13–5)	24 – Perdue	9 – Reisma	6 – Perdue	Wolstein Center (331); Cleveland, OH
February 26, 2025; 7:00 p.m., ESPN+		Wright State	W 81–46	23–7 (14–5)	20 – Perdue	7 – 2 tied	4 – 2 tied	Wolstein Center (533); Cleveland, OH
March 1, 2025; 2:00 p.m., ESPN+		at Youngstown State	L 70–73	23–8 (14–6)	18 – 2 tied	7 – Reisma	6 – 2 tied	Beeghly Center (1,421); Youngstown, OH
Horizon League tournament
March 6, 2025; 5:30 p.m., ESPN+	(3)	(6) Detroit Mercy; Quarterfinals	W 92–61	24–8	24 – Perdue	5 – Reisma	5 – Perdue	Wolstein Center (588); Cleveland, OH
March 10, 2025; 2:30 p.m., ESPN+	(3)	vs. (2) Purdue Fort Wayne; Semifinals	L 65–83	24–9	33 – Perdue	6 – 3 tied	6 – Perdue	Corteva Coliseum (1,500); Indianapolis, IN
WNIT
March 25, 2025*; 7:00 p.m., ESPN+		Coppin State; Round 2	W 72–70 ^{OT}	25–9	25 – Perdue	8 – 2 tied	5 – 2 tied	Wolstein Center (290); Cleveland, OH
March 28, 2025*; 7:00 p.m., ESPN+		Duquesne; Super 16	W 55–52	26–9	12 – 3 tied	9 – Leo	5 – Guerreiro	Wolstein Center (367); Cleveland, OH
March 31, 2025*; 7:00 pm, ESPN+		Purdue Fort Wayne; Great 8	W 76–65	27–9	22 – Leo	13 – Reisma	3 – 3 tied	Gates Sports Center (1,053); Fort Wayne, IN
April 2, 2025*; 6:00 pm, ESPN+		Buffalo; Fab 4	L 69–74	27–10	19 – Perdue	14 – Guerreiro	7 – Guerreiro	Alumni Arena (3,088); Amherst, NY
*Non-conference game. ^{#}Rankings from AP poll. (#) Tournament seedings in parentheses. All times are in Eastern.
