= 2024–25 Robert Morris Colonials women's basketball team =

American college basketball season

2024–25 Robert Morris Colonials women's basketball
- Conference: Horizon League
- Record: 14–15 (10–10 Horizon)
- Head coach: Chandler McCabe (1st season)
- Assistant coaches: Eddie Benton; Jack Trosper; Laryn Edwards
- Home arena: UPMC Events Center

2024–25 Horizon League women's basketball standings
	Conf.				Overall
Team	W		L	PCT	W		L	PCT
Green Bay †	19	–	1	.950	29	–	6	.829
Purdue Fort Wayne	18	–	2	.900	27	–	9	.750
Cleveland State	14	–	6	.700	27	–	10	.730
Robert Morris	10	–	10	.500	15	–	16	.484
Northern Kentucky	8	–	12	.400	11	–	21	.344
Detroit Mercy	8	–	12	.400	15	–	15	.500
IU Indy	8	–	12	.400	9	–	21	.300
Wright State	7	–	13	.350	10	–	22	.313
Youngstown State	7	–	13	.350	12	–	19	.387
Oakland	6	–	14	.300	9	–	22	.290
Milwaukee	5	–	15	.250	8	–	24	.250
† 2025 Horizon League tournament winner

The 2024–25 Robert Morris Colonials women's basketball team represented Robert Morris University during the 2024–25 NCAA Division I women's basketball season. The Colonials, led by first-year head coach Chandler McCabe, played their home games at the UPMC Events Center in Moon Township, Pennsylvania, as members of the Horizon League.

== Previous season ==
The Colonials finished the 2023–24 season 6–24, 2–18 in Horizon League play, to finish in last place. During the season, on February 12, 2024, head coach Charlie Buscaglia announced that he would be resigning, effective immediately, ending his eight-year tenure with the team, with associate head coach Scott Schneider being named interim head coach for the remainder of the season. They were defeated by Detroit Mercy in the first round of the Horizon League tournament.

On March 18, 2024, the school announced that they would be hiring UCF assistant coach Chandler McCabe as their new head coach.

== Roster ==
2024–25 Robert Morris Colonials women's basketball team
Players
Coaches

Pos.	#	Name	Height	Year	Previous school	Hometown
F	0	Mya Murray	6 ft 3 in (1.91 m)	GS	Brown	Uniontown, Pennsylvania
G/F	1	Raissa Nsabua	5 ft 10 in (1.78 m)	Sr	Wichita State	Ottawa, Ontario
G	2	Stephanie Theodossakos	5 ft 10 in (1.78 m)	RS Jr	Tampa	Boca Raton, Florida
G	3	Madison O'Dell	5 ft 6 in (1.68 m)	So	Gulfport High School	Gulfport, Mississippi
F	4	Danielle Vuletich	6 ft 2 in (1.88 m)	Sr	Western Reserve Academy	Columbiana, Ohio
G	5	Katelyn Chomko	5 ft 7 in (1.7 m)	Jr	Mineral Area College	Houston, Texas
G/F	6	Jennica Suggs	5 ft 11 in (1.8 m)	Fr	Central Florida Christian Academy	St. Paul, Minnesota
F	7	Naomi Barnwell	6 ft 1 in (1.85 m)	Sr	Monroe College	Chanteloup-les-Vignes, France
G	8	Alejandra Mastral	5 ft 7 in (1.7 m)	Sr	The British School of Argon	Zaragoza, Spain
G/F	11	Micah O'Dell	6 ft 0 in (1.83 m)	So	Gulfport High School	Gulfport, Mississippi
G/F	14	Rebecca Dwomoh	5 ft 11 in (1.8 m)	Sr	Nottingham Academy	London, England
G	20	Jada Lee	5 ft 6 in (1.68 m)	GS	Mount St. Mary's	Pittsburgh, Pennsylvania
G/F	22	Isys Grady	5 ft 11 in (1.8 m)	Sr	UNC Greensboro	Ormond Beach, Florida
G	23	Hailey Unger	5 ft 8 in (1.73 m)	Jr	USC Aiken	Dayton, Ohio
G	32	Noa Givon	5 ft 10 in (1.78 m)	Jr	Iona	Ra'anana, Israel
G	35	Simone Morris	5 ft 10 in (1.78 m)	Sr	Long Beach Poly High School	Carson, California

Head coach

- Chandler McCabe (Providence)

Assistant coach(es)

- Eddie Benton (Vermont)
- Jack Trosper (Texas A&M–CC)
- Laryn Edwards (Loyola (MD))

Legend

- (C) Team captain
- (S) Suspended
- (I) Ineligible
- (W) Walk-on
- Injured
- Current redshirt

Roster
Last update: February 11, 2025

== Schedule and results ==
Date time, TV	Rank^{#}	Opponent^{#}	Result	Record	High points	High rebounds	High assists	Site (attendance) city, state
Regular season
November 6, 2024*; 7:00 pm, ESPN+		Point Park	W 68–44	1–0	12 – Nsabua	12 – Murray	4 – Givon	UPMC Events Center (124); Moon Township, PA
November 9, 2024*; 12:00 pm, FloHoops		at Charleston	L 69–74 ^{OT}	1–1	17 – Givon	11 – Nsabua	6 – Nsabua	TD Arena (307); Charleston, SC
November 13, 2024*; 6:00 pm, ESPN+		at Akron	W 59–53	2–1	16 – Givon	9 – Vuletich	3 – Lee	James A. Rhodes Arena (701); Akron, OH
November 20, 2024*; 7:00 pm, ESPN+		Saint Francis	L 55–58	2–2	15 – Grady	5 – tied	4 – tied	UPMC Events Center (203); Moon Township, PA
November 23, 2024*; 1:00 pm, ACCNX		at Pittsburgh	L 51–64	2–3	12 – Lee	7 – Murray	3 – tied	Petersen Events Center (219); Pittsburgh, PA
November 25, 2024*; 6:00 pm, ESPN+		at Duquesne	L 61–77	2–4	20 – Ma. O'Dell	8 – Barnwell	3 – tied	UPMC Cooper Fieldhouse (888); Pittsburgh, PA
November 29, 2024*; 2:00 pm, ESPN+		Bucknell	L 54–65	2–5	13 – Givon	5 – Murray	2 – Lee	UPMC Events Center (221); Moon Township, PA
December 4, 2024; 7:00 pm, ESPN+		at Purdue Fort Wayne	L 57–68	2–6 (0–1)	16 – Vuletich	8 – Grady	1 – tied	Gates Sports Center (452); Fort Wayne, IN
December 7, 2024; 2:00 pm, ESPN+		Milwaukee	W 56–55	3–6 (1–1)	10 – Givon	6 – tied	2 – tied	UPMC Events Center (109); Moon Township, PA
December 14, 2024*; 2:00 pm, ESPN+		Mercyhurst	W 69–49	4–6	13 – Lee	5 – tied	4 – Vuletich	UPMC Events Center (220); Moon Township, PA
December 18, 2024; 7:00 pm, ESPN+		Oakland	L 53–55	4–7 (1–2)	19 – Vuletich	8 – Vuletich	3 – tied	UPMC Events Center (249); Moon Township, PA
December 21, 2024*; 4:00 pm, ESPN+		St. Bonaventure	W 65–41	5–7	16 – tied	6 – tied	2 – tied	UPMC Events Center (213); Moon Township, PA
December 28, 2024; 2:00 pm, ESPN+		Detroit Mercy	L 58–66	5–8 (1–3)	12 – Givon	7 – Vuletich	3 – Grady	UPMC Events Center (146); Moon Township, PA
January 4, 2025; 2:00 pm, ESPN+		at IU Indy	L 46–56	5–9 (1–4)	14 – tied	8 – Nsabua	1 – tied	The Jungle (458); Indianapolis, IN
January 8, 2025; 6:00 pm, ESPN+		at Northern Kentucky	L 58–72	5–10 (1–5)	17 – Murray	9 – Murray	3 – Grady	Truist Arena (1,429); Highland Heights, KY
January 11, 2025; 2:00 pm, ESPN+		Green Bay	L 48–78	5–11 (1–6)	13 – Mi. O'Dell	6 – Mastral	3 – tied	UPMC Events Center (207); Moon Township, PA
January 15, 2025; 11:00 am, ESPN+		Cleveland State	L 53–74	5–12 (1–7)	10 – Givon	7 – Nsabua	4 – tied	UPMC Events Center (873); Moon Township, PA
January 18, 2025; 2:00 pm, ESPN+		at Youngstown State	W 67–61	6–12 (2–7)	20 – Givon	7 – Barnwell	4 – Nsabua	Beeghly Center (3,172); Youngstown, OH
January 23, 2025; 7:00 pm, ESPN+		at Oakland	W 73–63	7–12 (3–7)	12 – tied	11 – Murray	3 – Lee	OU Credit Union O'rena (704); Auburn Hills, MI
January 25, 2025; 1:00 pm, ESPN+		at Detroit Mercy	W 77–64	8–12 (4–7)	19 – Nsabua	8 – tied	3 – tied	Calihan Hall (333); Detroit, MI
January 29, 2025; 7:00 pm, ESPN+		Wright State	W 74–53	9–12 (5–7)	16 – Murray	10 – Nsabua	4 – tied	UPMC Events Center (231); Moon Township, PA
January 31, 2025; 7:00 pm, ESPN+		Purdue Fort Wayne	L 54–63	9–13 (5–8)	13 – Grady	11 – Murray	5 – Nsabua	UPMC Events Center (321); Moon Township, PA
February 6, 2025; 7:00 pm, ESPN+		at Milwaukee	W 58–52	10–13 (6–8)	17 – Grady	9 – Murray	4 – Murray	Klotsche Center (497); Milwaukee, WI
February 8, 2025; 2:00 pm, ESPN+		at Green Bay	L 39–71	10–14 (6–9)	6 – tied	6 – Suggs	2 – tied	Kress Events Center (1,952); Green Bay, WI
February 13, 2025; 7:00 pm, ESPN+		IU Indy	W 61–58	11–14 (7–9)	14 – Givon	11 – Murray	3 – tied	UPMC Events Center (226); Moon Township, PA
February 16, 2025; 2:00 pm, ESPN+		Northern Kentucky	W 63–59	12–14 (8–9)	15 – Grady	7 – tied	6 – Lee	UPMC Events Center (321); Moon Township, PA
February 22, 2025; 2:00 pm, ESPN+		at Cleveland State	L 53–85	12–15 (8–10)	15 – Chomko	5 – Barnwell	2 – tied	Wolstein Center (331); Cleveland, OH
February 26, 2025; 7:00 pm, ESPN+		Youngstown State	W 76–53	13–15 (9–10)	20 – Givon	10 – Givon	5 – tied	UPMC Events Center (412); Moon Township, PA
March 1, 2025; 2:00 pm, ESPN+		at Wright State	W 73–57	14–15 (10–10)	15 – Givon	6 – Givon	4 – tied	Nutter Center (1,040); Fairborn, OH
Horizon League tournament
March 6, 2025; 5:30 pm, ESPN+	(4)	(5) Northern Kentucky; Quarterfinals	W 70–57	15–15	23 – Givon	7 – Nsabua	6 – Lee	UPMC Events Center (748); Moon Township, PA
March 10, 2025; 12:00 pm, ESPN+	(4)	(1) Green Bay; Semifinals	L 53–67	15–16	13 – Grady	10 – Murray	4 – tied	Corteva Coliseum; Indianapolis, IN
*Non-conference game. ^{#}Rankings from AP poll. (#) Tournament seedings in parentheses. All times are in Eastern.
