= Kayla Karius =

American basketball player and coach (born 1989)

Current position
- Title: Head coach
- Team: Green Bay
- Conference: Horizon League
- Record: 55–16 (.775)

Biographical details
- Born: April 9, 1989

Playing career

College:
- 2007–2011: Green Bay

Professional:
- 2011–2012: Waregem (Belgium)
- 2012–2013: Racing (Luxembourg)
- 2013–2015: Saarlouis Royals (Germany)
- Position: Guard-Forward

Coaching career (HC unless noted)
- 2015–2016: Sioux Falls (assistant)
- 2016–2018: South Dakota (assistant)
- 2018–2020: Wisconsin (assistant)
- 2020–2021: Wisconsin (associate HC)
- 2021–2022: Drake (assistant)
- 2022–2024: South Dakota
- 2024–present: Green Bay

Head coaching record
- Overall: 91–44 (.674)
- Tournaments: 2–1 (WNIT); 0–2 (NCAA)

Accomplishments and honors

Championships
- 2× Horizon League tournament (2025, 2026); 2× Horizon League regular season (2025, 2026)

Awards
- Horizon League Coach of the Year (2026)

Kayla Chloe Karius (née Tetschlag, born April 9, 1989) is an American basketball coach and former player who is the current head coach of the Green Bay Phoenix women's basketball team. Prior to her return to Green Bay, she was the head coach at South Dakota from 2022 until 2024.

== Early life and playing career ==
A native of Sheboygan, Wisconsin, Karius attended Sheboygan North High School where she was a first-team all-state selection in her senior year.

=== College career ===
Karius played college basketball for the Green Bay Phoenix from 2007 to 2011. Kayla helped lead Green Bay to four Horizon League regular season titles with three NCAA Tournament bids. Of those three NCAA Tournament berths, Green Bay reached the 2nd round in 2010 and then their first ever Sweet 16 in 2011.

In Karius' 4-year career at Green Bay, Kayla scored 1,372 points and grabbed 675 rebounds, placing her on the school's Division 1 top-10 career all-time list for both categories.

In her final game with Green Bay, Karius notched a double-double with 27 points and 10 rebounds against the Baylor Bears in the Sweet 16 of the 2011 NCAA Tournament, also earning a spot on the NCAA Dallas All-Regional Team.

Kayla's Horizon League Honors at Green Bay:

- 2009 Sixth Player of the Year
- 2010 and 2011 First-Team
- 2010 and 2011 All-Tournament Team
- 2011 All-Defensive Team
- 2011 Co-Player of the Year (shared with Green Bay teammate Celeste Hoewisch)
- 2011 NCAA Tournament All-Regional Team
- 2011 Cecil N. Coleman Award Winner

==== Green Bay statistics ====
Legend
GP	Games played	GS	Games started	MPG	Minutes per game
FG%	Field goal percentage	3P%	3-point field goal percentage	FT%	Free throw percentage
RPG	Rebounds per game	APG	Assists per game	SPG	Steals per game
BPG	Blocks per game	PPG	Points per game	**Bold**	Career high

Year	Team	GP	MPG	Points	FG%	3P%	FT%	RPG	APG	SPG	BPG	PPG
2007–08	Green Bay	26	15.3	121	51.9	37.5	77.3	3.1	0.9	0.7	0.2	4.7
2008–09	Green Bay	33	22.3	238	50.3	32.7	66.7	3.1	1.1	1.3	0.2	7.2
2009–10	Green Bay	33	**32.1**	501	**55.9**	**42.6**	80.5	6.5	**2.8**	1.5	**0.7**	**15.2**
2010–11	Green Bay	**36**	31.1	**512**	50.6	33.3	**81.8**	**7.6**	2.7	**2.2**	0.1	14.2
Career	Green Bay	128	25.9	1372	52.4	33.3	78.6	5.3	1.9	1.5	0.3	10.7

=== Professional career ===
Between 2011 and 2015, Karius played basketball professionally in Europe for Basket Waregem (Belgium), Basket Racing Club (Luxembourg), and Saarlouis Royals (Germany).

== Coaching career ==
On April 11, 2022, Karius was announced as the head coach of the South Dakota Coyotes women's basketball team. In her two seasons at South Dakota, the Coyotes had a record of 37–29 and appeared in the 2024 Women's National Invitation Tournament.

On April 23, 2024, Karius was named the fourth head coach in Green Bay Phoenix women's basketball program history.

In Kayla's first season at the helm, she guided the 2025 Green Bay team to a 29–6 overall record (19–1 conference), including a 22-game winning streak en route to winning both Horizon League regular season and tournament championships. It also marked the 20th time in school history to make the NCAA Women's Basketball Tournament. On March 15, 2025, Karius signed a 2-year contract extension with Green Bay that lasts into the 2030–31 season.

On April 15, 2026, Green Bay announced they had extended Kayla Karius through the 2034-35 season, the longest contract extension in college basketball at the time.

== Head coaching record ==
Record table
Season	Team	Overall	Conference	Standing	Postseason
South Dakota Coyotes (Summit League) (2022–2024)
2022–23	South Dakota	14–16	10–8	4th	
2023–24	South Dakota	23–13	9–7	4th	WNIT Super 16
South Dakota:		37–29 (.561)	19–15 (.559)		
Green Bay Phoenix (Horizon League) (2024–present)
2024–25	Green Bay	29–6	19–1	1st	NCAA Division I First Round
2025–26	Green Bay	25–9	17–3	1st	NCAA Division I First Round
2026–27	Green Bay	1–1	0–0		
Green Bay:		55–16 (.775)	36–4 (.900)		
Total:		92–45 (.672)			
National champion Postseason invitational champion Conference regular season champion Conference regular season and conference tournament champion Division regular season champion Division regular season and conference tournament champion Conference tournament champion
