= Maddy Schreiber =

American basketball player (born 2003)

No. 34 – Green Bay Phoenix
- Position: Guard/Forward
- League: Horizon League

Personal information
- Born: November 8, 2003 (age 23) Appleton, Wisconsin, U.S.
- Listed height: 6 ft 0 in (1.83 m)

Career information
- High school: Kimberly (Kimberly, WI)
- College: Green Bay (2021–present)

Career highlights
- First-team All-Horizon League (2025); Second-team All-Horizon League (2024); Horizon League All-Freshman Team (2022)

Maddy Schreiber (born November 8, 2003) is an American college basketball player, currently playing for the Green Bay Phoenix of the Horizon League.

Since Schreiber joined Green Bay in 2021, the team has earned postseason bids in all of her four seasons with the Phoenix, including two automatic bids to the NCAA Tournament in 2024 and 2025. In terms of Horizon League Titles, Green Bay has won two regular season titles (2023, 2025) and two tournament titles (2024, 2025).

== High school career ==
Attending Kimberly High School, Schreiber finished her four year prep basketball career scoring 1,482 points with a 3-point shooting percentage of 37.6, including a 19.5 points per game average her senior year.

In 2021, Schreiber was voted to both Wisconsin Basketball Coaches Association (WBCA) All-State Division 1 Girls Basketball All-State Team and Associated Press (AP) All-State First-Team.

== College career ==
Schreiber committed to Green Bay, who also had NCAA Division I offers from Wisconsin and Wisconsin-Milwaukee.

As a freshman, Schreiber played in all 27 games and starting in 18, registering shooting percentages of 49% and 40.3% from three-point range (25 of 62) while averaging 7 points points per game. At the end of the regular season, Maddy was voted to the league's All-Freshman Team alongside teammate Bailey Butler. On March 17, 2022, she scored her season high 13 points against Minnesota in a first round game of the Women's National Invitational Tournament (WNIT).

Schreiber was limited to 17 games during her sophomore year due to injury, averaging 9.9 points per game with a 53% field goal percentage. On December 14, 2022, Schreiber scored her season high of 19 points in a home win against Wisconsin. One week later on December 21, she scored 16 points on a perfect 8-for-8 from the field during a win against Chicago State.

As a junior, Schreiber started all 34 games and averaged 12.1 points per game (ranking second on the team) while shooting 55.3% from the field and a team leading 42.3% from three-point range. On November 30, 2023, Schreiber scored her season high 23 points vs. Milwaukee. At regular season's end, Schreiber was voted onto the Horizon League All-League Second Team. Green Bay won the Horizon League Tournament, earning an automatic bid into the 2024 NCAA Tournament. In Green Bay's first round game against Tennessee on March 23, Schreiber was the team's leading scorer with 13 points.

Before the start of Schreiber's senior season, she was voted onto the Horizon League's Preseason All-League Second Team on October 16, 2024. Schreiber started the team's first twelve games before sustaining a broken wrist on December 12 against Creighton and was able to return for the January 30 against Cleveland State. For the remainder of the season, Schreiber came off the bench and averaged 12.7 points per game with a field goal shooting percentage of 47.8%, 44% from 3-point range and 90% on free throws. Along with the Phoenix winning both the Horizon League regular season and tournament titles, Schreiber was voted to the All-League First-Team and All-League Tournament Team, both alongside Green Bay teammate Natalie McNeal.
