= Natalie McNeal =

American basketball player

No. 11 – Green Bay Phoenix
- Position: Guard
- League: Horizon League

Personal information
- Born: Germantown, Wisconsin, U.S.
- Listed height: 5 ft 8 in (1.73 m)

Career information
- High school: Germantown (Germantown, WI)
- College: St. Louis (2020–2022); Green Bay (2022–2025)

Career highlights
- 2x First-team Horizon League (2024, 2025); 2x Horizon League Tournament MVP (2024, 2025)

Natalie McNeal is an American former collegiate basketball player, spending three seasons playing for the Green Bay Phoenix of the Horizon League after spending her freshman season with the Saint Louis Billikens.

Since transferring to Green Bay in 2022, McNeal has helped lead the program back to winning Horizon League Conference Championships, two regular season titles (2023, 2025) and two conference tournament titles (2024, 2025). These titles have led to postseason berths in the 2023 WNIT, plus the NCAA Tournament in 2024 and 2025.

== High school career ==
McNeal attended Germantown High School from 2016 to 2020. Playing varsity basketball all four years, she finished her prep career scoring more than 1,500 points and averaging at least 13.8 points during each of her four seasons. McNeal was twice named Greater Metro Conference player of the year and first-team all-state selection (Wisconsin Basketball Coaches Association).

After receiving numerous college offers, McNeal officially committed to the St. Louis Billikens of the Atlantic 10 Conference on Fall 2019 signing day.

== College career ==
=== St. Louis ===
As a freshman in 2020–21, McNeal played in 17 total games, including postseason play in the WNIT (reaching the quarterfinals). She scored a season-high 13 points against St. Joseph's on February 8.

In 2021–22, McNeal appeared in all 27 games and started in 24. McNeal scored her season Billiken career high of 18 points against Florida Gulf Coast on November 27, while logging double-doubles against SIUE (11 points, 10 rebounds) on December 9 and St. Bonaventure (13 points, 10 rebounds) on January 19. On the season, she averaged 9.4 and 5.3 rebounds. After the season, McNeal entered the NCAA transfer portal.

=== Green Bay ===
On April 22, Green Bay announced the addition of McNeal, one of two additions for the Phoenix from the portal.

==== Sophomore season (2022–23) ====
McNeal played in all 34 games off the bench, averaging of 5.9 points and 4.9 rebounds per game. McNeal notched two double-doubles against Wright State on February 2 (16 points and 16 rebounds) and against Cleveland State in the Horizon League Tournament Final on March 7 (18 points and 13 rebounds). The 2023 Green Bay Phoenix won the regular season title and reached the 2nd round of the WNIT.

==== Junior season (2023–24) ====
Named to the Horizon League All–League First Team, McNeal was Green Bay's leading scorer and rebounder at 13.2 points and 6.8 rebounds per game. Her first career 30-point game was at Cleveland State on February 3. She also tied a career high 16 rebounds vs. Northern Kentucky on February 8. McNeal scored a career high 32 points in the Horizon League Championship Game win against Cleveland State (64–40), earning her Horizon League All-Tournament honors plus the Tournament MVP, giving the 2024 Green Bay Phoenix their first NCAA tournament bid since 2018.

==== Senior season (2024–25) ====
McNeal entered the campaign as a preseason All-League First-Team. On January 11, McNeal scored 22 points and grabbed a career-high 18 rebounds against Robert Morris, one of her six double-double performances on the season. On March 1, McNeal scored a season-high 27 points along with 13 rebounds in an overtime home win vs. Purdue Fort Wayne (68-63), helping clinch the league regular season title. On March 11, McNeal poured in 26 points in Green Bay's win over Purdue Fort Wayne 76-63 in the league tournament final. The tournament win sealed another bid to the NCAA Tournament for Green Bay. She led the team in scoring with 14.9 points and 7.3 rebounds per game which also ranked 6th and 4th in the league, respectively. McNeal was voted to the All-League First-Team and All-League Tournament Team (both alongside Green Bay teammate Maddy Schreiber) plus League Tournament MVP.
