= OU Credit Union O'rena =

Multi-purpose arena in Auburn Hills, Michigan

- "The Blacktop"
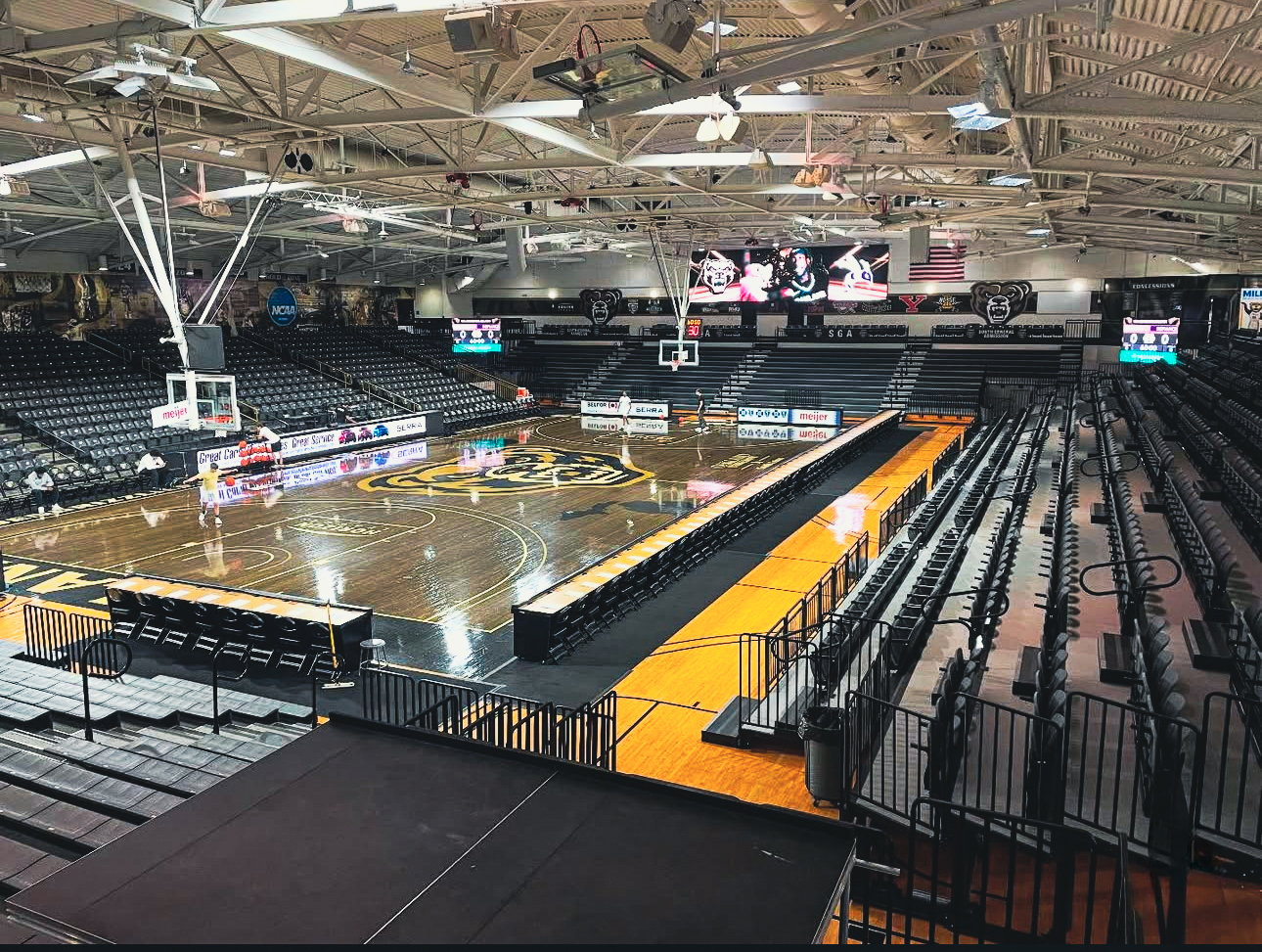
- The O'rena in 2025
- Interactive map of OU Credit Union O'rena
- Former names: Athletics Center O'rena (1998–2023)
- Location: Oakland University; Auburn Hills, Michigan
- Coordinates: 42.673972°N 83.213158°W
- Owner: Oakland University
- Operator: Oakland University
- Capacity: 4,000
- Surface: Hardwood

Construction
- Groundbreaking: 1996
- Opened: November 16, 1998
- Cost: $32 million ($63.2 million in 2025 dollars)
- Architects: TMP Architecture, Inc.

Tenants
- Oakland University; Men's and Women's Basketball; Volleyball

The Oakland University Credit Union O'rena, nicknamed "The Blacktop", is a 4,000-seat multi-purpose arena on the campus of Oakland University in Auburn Hills, Michigan. It is home to the Oakland University Golden Grizzlies men's basketball, women's basketball and volleyball teams. The court has a distinctive "blacktop" color first used in the 2015–16 season.

== History ==
The facility opened November 17, 1998, with a 96–66 loss to Michigan State University in men's basketball. The opening of the O'rena coincided with Oakland's move from Division II of the National Collegiate Athletic Association (NCAA) to Division I.

On April 17, 2023, Oakland University Athletics announced that they had signed a 10-year naming rights deal with Oakland University Credit Union. The naming rights deal began on July 1.

== Attendance ==
Largest attendance
Date	Opponent	Attendance
Jan 13, 2017	Detroit Mercy	4,123
Feb 26, 2016	Detroit Mercy	4,114
Jan 8, 2016	Valparaiso	4,110
Feb 15, 2015	Detroit Mercy	4,101
Feb 14, 2014	Detroit Mercy	4,065

The O'rena attendance record is 4,123, set January 13, 2017, against the University of Detroit Mercy. There have been seven other crowds over 4,000: 4,114 vs. Detroit (2015–16), 4,110 vs. Valparaiso (2015–16), 4,101 vs. Detroit (2014–15), 4,065 vs. Detroit (2013–14), 4,063 vs. Georgia (2016–17), 4,055 vs. University of Missouri (2003–04) and 4,034 vs. Oral Roberts University (2009–10).

== Power Five conference opponents ==
Oakland has a 4–2 record all-time against Power Five conference schools at home. They have defeated Michigan (2000–01 season), Texas A&M (2003–04), Tennessee (2011–12) and Georgia (2016–17) since the arena opened in 1998.

== See also ==
- List of NCAA Division I basketball arenas
