= Cleveland State Vikings women's basketball =

Women's college basketball team

Cleveland State Vikings
2026–27 Cleveland State Vikings women's basketball team
- University: Cleveland State University
- Head coach: Bob Dunn (1st season)
- Location: Cleveland, Ohio
- Arena: Wolstein Center (capacity: 13,610)
- Conference: Horizon League
- Nickname: Vikings
- Colors: Forest green and white

NCAA Division I tournament appearances
- 2008, 2010, 2023

Conference tournament champions
- 2008, 2010, 2023

Conference regular-season champions
- 2024

Uniforms
Home	Away

The Cleveland State Vikings women's basketball team represents Cleveland State University in women's basketball. Since 1994, they have been a member of the Horizon League. The Cleveland State women's basketball team was formerly in the North Star Conference (1988–1992) and Mid-Continent Conference (1992–1994). Prior to 1988, the Cleveland State women's basketball team was not affiliated with any conference.

== Records ==
=== Individual-career points ===
#	Points	Player
1	2,140	Kailey Klein
2	1,851	Dianne Foster
3	1,840	Shalonda Winton
4	1,805	Audra Cook
5	1,748	Debra Taylor
6	1,468	Shawnita Garland
7	1,458	Erika Roudebush
8	1,366	Mahogany Green
9	1,250	Lori Johnson
10	1,229	Mary Petrecca
11	1,227	Sue Hlavacek

=== Individual-triple doubles ===
Only seven triple-doubles have been recorded in the history of Cleveland State women's basketball.

#	Player	Points	Rebounds	Assists	Opponent	Date
1	Sue Koziol	10	10	15	Illinois-Chicago	February 5, 1983
2	Sue Koziol	18	10	15	Detroit	February 22, 1983
3	Mahogany Green	16	13	10	Niagara	November 19, 2000
4	Ashley Schrock	21	12	10	Wright State	February 12, 2003
5	Ashley Schrock	13	13	10	Youngstown State	February 15, 2003
6	Shalonda Winton	29	14	11	Miami (OH)	December 8, 2012
7	Shalonda Winton	18	12	11	Lake Erie	December 30, 2012

=== Record versus Horizon League ===
Records vs Horizon League schools as of the end of 2017–2018 season.

Rival	Record (W–L)	Win %
Detroit Mercy	20–40	.333
Green Bay	6–62	.088
IU Indy	6–3	.667
Milwaukee	23–31	.426
Northern Illinois	3–16	.158
Northern Kentucky	5–3	.625
Oakland	6–5	.545
Purdue Fort Wayne	5–1	.833
Robert Morris	3–3	.500
Wright State	37–36	.507
Youngstown State	31–39	.443

=== Record versus Ohio schools ===
Records versus Ohio schools as of January 30, 2013.

Rival	Record (W-L)	Win %
Akron	34–27	.557
Ashland	2–4	.333
Baldwin Wallace	1–0	1.000
Bowling Green	3–9	.250
Case Western Reserve	3–0	1.000
Cedarville	0–1	.000
Central State	4–0	1.000
Cincinnati	4–14	.222
Dayton	1–7	.125
Hiram	2–0	1.000
John Carroll	5–2	.714
Kent State	11–16	.407
Kent-Tuscarawas	0–1	.000
Lake Erie	4–0	1.000
Lorain C.C.	2–1	.667

Rival	Record (W-L)	Win %
Malone	7–2	.778
Marietta	1–0	1.000
Miami (OH)	1–7	.125
Mount Union	1–0	1.000
Oberlin	4–1	.800
Ohio	7–15	.318
Ohio Northern	3–0	1.000
Ohio State	0–5	.000
Ohio Wesleyan	1–0	1.000
Toledo	8–14	.364
Wooster	3–1	.750
Wright State	31–28	.525
Xavier (OH)	9–4	.692
Youngstown State	26–32	.448

== Record year-by-year ==
Record table
Season	Coach	Overall	Conference	Standing	Postseason
Cleveland State (Independent) (1973–1988)
1973–1974	Jane Pease	2–2	N/A		
1974–1975	Jane Pease	10–3	N/A		
1975–1976	Jane Pease	13–4	N/A		
1976–1977	Jane Pease	3–11	N/A		
Jane Pease:		28–20 (.583)			
1977–1978	Louise Furjanic	8–7	N/A		
1978–1979	Louise Furjanic	11–9	N/A		
1979–1980	Louise Furjanic	12–12	N/A		
Louise Furjanic:		31–28 (.525)			
1980–1981	Alice Khol	16–8	N/A		
1981–1982	Alice Khol	14–15	N/A		
1982–1983	Alice Khol	23–6	N/A		
1983–1984	Alice Khol	19–8	N/A		
1984–1985	Alice Khol	5–22	N/A		
1985–1986	Alice Khol	6–20	N/A		
1986–1987	Alice Khol	7–21	N/A		
1987–1988	Alice Khol	7–21	N/A		
Cleveland State (North Star Conference) (1988–1992)
1988–1989	Alice Khol	3–25	2–12	8th	
1989–1990	Alice Khol	8–20	2–10	6th	
1990–1991	Alice Khol	7–21	3–11	T–6th	
Alice Khol:		115–187 (.381)	7–33 (.175)		
1991–1992	Loretta Hummeldorf	8–21	4–8	5th	
Cleveland State (Mid-Continent Conference) (1992–1994)
1992–1993	Loretta Hummeldorf	7–20	6–10	6th	
1993–1994	Loretta Hummeldorf	11–16	7–11	T–7th	
Cleveland State (Horizon League) (1994–present)
1994–1995	Loretta Hummeldorf	6–21	3–13	T–10th	
Loretta Hummeldorf:		32–78 (.291)	20–42 (.323)		
1995–1996	Duffy Burns	11–16	6–10	5th	
1996–1997	Duffy Burns	12–15	8–8	5th	
1997–1998	Duffy Burns	12–16	8–6	3rd	
1998–1999	Duffy Burns	15–13	8–6	4th	
1999–2000	Duffy Burns	15–15	5–9	T–6th	
2000–2001	Duffy Burns	14–14	7–7	4th	
2001–2002	Duffy Burns	13–15	7–9	6th	
2002–2003	Duffy Burns	11–18	7–9	6th	
Duffy Burns:		103–122 (.458)	56–64 (.467)		
2003–2004	Kate Peterson Abiad	12–16	9–7	T–4th	
2004–2005	Kate Peterson Abiad	4–25	2–14	9th	
2005–2006	Kate Peterson Abiad	4–24	2–14	9th	
2006–2007	Kate Peterson Abiad	8–22	5–11	T–6th	
2007–2008	Kate Peterson Abiad	19–14	10–8	T–4th	NCAA First Round
2008–2009	Kate Peterson Abiad	19–13	12–6	3rd	
2009–2010	Kate Peterson Abiad	19–14	11–7	4th	NCAA First Round
2010–2011	Kate Peterson Abiad	21–12	12–6	T–2nd	WBI Second Round
2011–2012	Kate Peterson Abiad	12–19	6–12	7th	
2012–2013	Kate Peterson Abiad	13–17	5–11	T–6th	
2013–2014	Kate Peterson Abiad	14–16	9–7	5th	
2014–2015	Kate Peterson Abiad	19–13	10–6	3rd	
2015–2016	Kate Peterson Abiad	9–20	6–12	8th	
2016–2017	Kate Peterson Abiad	14–16	9–9	6th	
2017–2018	Kate Peterson Abiad	19–11	11–7	T–4th	
Kate Peterson Abiad:		206–252 (.450)	119–137 (.465)		
2018–2019	Chris Kielsmeier	10–20	7–11	7th	
2019–2020	Chris Kielsmeier	21–11	9–9	6th	
2020–2021	Chris Kielsmeier	14–9	8–8	6th	WBI Champions
2021–2022	Chris Kielsmeier	23–9	14–6	T–4th	WBI Runner-Up
2022–2023	Chris Kielsmeier	30–5	17–3	2nd	NCAA First Round
2023–2024	Chris Kielsmeier	29–6	18–2	1st	WBIT First Round
2024–2025	Chris Kielsmeier	27–10	14–6	3rd	WNIT Fab Four
2025–2026	Chris Kielsmeier	26–10	13–7	3rd	WNIT Great Eight
Chris Kielsmeier:		180–80 (.692)	100–52 (.658)		
Total:		695–767 (.475)	302–328 (.479)		
National champion Postseason invitational champion Conference regular season champion Conference regular season and conference tournament champion Division regular season champion Division regular season and conference tournament champion Conference tournament champion

=== Head coaching history ===
#	Name	Years	Record
1	Jane Pease	1973–1977	28–20
2	Louise Furjanic	1977–1980	31–28
3	Alice Khol	1980–1991	115–187
4	Loretta Hummeldorf	1991–1995	32–78
5	Duffy Burns	1995–2003	103–122
6	Kate Peterson Abiad	2003–2018	206–252
7	Chris Kielsmeier	2018–2026	180–80
8	Bob Dunn	2026–present	N/A

=== Conference tournament History ===
==== North Star Conference ====
Date	Seed	Location	Round	Result
March 9, 1989	8th	Chicago, Illinois	First	L 64–96 to Northern Illinois
March 9, 1990	6th	DeKalb, Illinois	First	L 68–67 to Green Bay
March 7, 1991	7th	Green Bay, Wisconsin	First	L 84–60 to Northern Illinois
March 5, 1992	5th	DeKalb, Illinois	First	W 83–68 over Wright State
March 6, 1992		DeKalb, Illinois	Second	L 78–56 to Green Bay

==== Mid-Continent Conference ====
Date	Seed	Location	Round	Result
March 11, 1993	6th	Green Bay, Wisconsin	First	L 89–74 to (3) Youngstown State
March 10, 1994	7th	DeKalb, Illinois	First	L 84–75 to (2) Green Bay

==== Horizon League ====
Date	Seed	Location	Round	Result
March 5, 1995	11th	Philadelphia, Pennsylvania	First	L 79–62 to (6) La Salle
March 7, 1996	5th	Green Bay, Wisconsin	Quarterfinal	L 79–77 to (4) Illinois-Chicago
March 6, 1997	5th	Green Bay, Wisconsin	Quarterfinal	L 79–61 to (4) Milwaukee
March 5, 1998	3rd	Indianapolis, Indiana	Quarterfinal	W 63–56 over (6) Wright State
March 6, 1998		Indianapolis, Indiana	Semifinal	L 83–55 to (2) Green Bay
March 5, 1999	4th	Wolstein Center • Cleveland, Ohio	Quarterfinal	W 74–61 over (5) Milwaukee
March 6, 1999		Wolstein Center • Cleveland, Ohio	Semifinal	L 70–68 to (1) Green Bay
March 9, 2000	7th	Detroit, Michigan	First	W 73–68 over (2) Milwaukee
March 10, 2000		Detroit, Michigan	Semifinal	W 72–68 2OT over (6) Wright State
March 11, 2000		Detroit, Michigan	Championship	L 79–72 to (1) Green Bay
March 8, 2001	4th	UIC Pavilion • Chicago, Illinois	Quarterfinal	L 65–63 to (5) Illinois-Chicago
February 28, 2002	6th	Joseph J. Gentile Arena • Chicago, Illinois	Quarterfinal	L 87–73 to (3) Detroit
March 6, 2003	6th	Phoenix Sports Center • Green Bay, Wisconsin	Quarterfinal	W 83–69 over (3) Milwaukee
March 7, 2003		Phoenix Sports Center • Green Bay, Wisconsin	Semifinal	L 75–74 to (7) Detroit
March 4, 2004	4th	Wolstein Center • Cleveland, Ohio	Quarterfinal	L 69–59 to (5) Butler
March 1, 2005	9th	Joseph J. Gentile Arena • Chicago, Illinois	First	W 83–69 over (8) Loyola
March 3, 2005		Phoenix Sports Center • Green Bay, Wisconsin	Quarterfinal	L 96–66 to (1) Green Bay
February 26, 2006	9th	Joseph J. Gentile Arena • Chicago, Illinois	First	L 85–82 OT to (8) Loyola
March 7, 2007	7th	UIC Pavilion • Chicago, Illinois	Quarterfinal	L 69–50 to (2) Illinois-Chicago
March 12, 2008	4th	Wolstein Center • Cleveland, Ohio	Quarterfinal	W 79–68 over (5) Butler
March 14, 2008		Kress Events Center • Green Bay, Wisconsin	Semifinal	W 90–66 over (1) Green Bay
March 16, 2008		Kress Events Center • Green Bay, Wisconsin	Championship	W 70–56 over (2) Wright State
March 11, 2009	3rd	Wolstein Center • Cleveland, Ohio	Quarterfinal	W 80–60 over (6) Illinois-Chicago
March 13, 2009		Kress Events Center • Green Bay, Wisconsin	Semifinal	L 63–57 to (7) Milwaukee
March 10, 2010	4th	Wolstein Center • Cleveland, Ohio	Quarterfinal	W 78–72 over (5) Illinois-Chicago
March 12, 2010		Kress Events Center • Green Bay, Wisconsin	Semifinal	W 83–75 OT over (1) Green Bay
March 16, 2010		Kress Events Center • Green Bay, Wisconsin	Championship	W 66–57 over (2) Butler
March 9, 2011	3rd	Wolstein Center • Cleveland, Ohio	Quarterfinal	W 61–58 over (6) Illinois-Chicago
March 11, 2011		Kress Events Center • Green Bay, Wisconsin	Semifinal	L 68–54 to (2) Butler
March 5, 2012	7th	Wolstein Center • Cleveland, Ohio	First	W 59–56 over (10) Youngstown State
March 6, 2012		Calihan Hall • Detroit, Michigan	Quarterfinal	L 79–43 to (2) Detroit
March 13, 2013	7th	Beeghly Center • Youngstown, Ohio	Quarterfinal	L 69–62 to (2) Youngstown State
March 13, 2014	5th	UIC Pavilion • Illinois, Chicago	Quarterfinal	L 77–72 to (4) UIC
March 11, 2015	3rd	Wolstein Center • Cleveland, Ohio	Quarterfinal	W 76–70 over (6) Illinois-Chicago
March 13, 2015		Kress Center • Green Bay, Wisconsin	Semifinal	L 99–87 to (2) Wright State
March 10, 2016	8th	Kress Center • Green Bay, Wisconsin	First	L 71–59 to (5) Northern Kentucky
March 5, 2017	6th	Joe Louis Arena • Detroit, Michigan	Second	L 70–56 to (3) Detroit
March 4, 2018	6th	Little Caesars Arena • Detroit, Michigan	Second	L 83–61 to (3) Wright State
March 6, 2019	7th	Kress Events Center • Green Bay, Wisconsin	Quarterfinals	L 73–30 to (2) Green Bay
March 3, 2020	6th	Wolstein Center • Cleveland, Ohio	First	W 84–48 over (7) Youngstown State
March 5, 2020		Nutter Center • Fairborn, Ohio	Quarterfinal	W 63–52 over (3) Wright State
March 9, 2020		Indiana Farmers Coliseum • Indianapolis, Indiana	Semifinals	L 71–54 to (1) IUPUI
February 26, 2021	6th	Indiana Farmers Coliseum • Indianapolis, Indiana	First	W 69–43 over (11) UIC
March 2, 2021		Indiana Farmers Coliseum • Indianapolis, Indiana	Quarterfinal	W 69–63 over (3) Green Bay
March 8, 2021		Indiana Farmers Coliseum • Indianapolis, Indiana	Semifinals	L 73–62 to (1) Wright State
March 3, 2022	4th	Indiana Farmers Coliseum • Indianapolis, Indiana	Quarterfinal	W 59–51 over (5) Northern Kentucky
March 7, 2022		Indiana Farmers Coliseum • Indianapolis, Indiana	Semifinal	W 69–42 over (3) Green Bay
March 8, 2022		Indiana Farmers Coliseum • Indianapolis, Indiana	Championship	L 61–54 to (1) IUPUI
March 2, 2023	2nd	Wolstein Center • Cleveland, Ohio	Quarterfinal	W 65–52 over (7) Milwaukee
March 6, 2023		Indiana Farmers Coliseum • Indianapolis, Indiana	Semifinal	W 63–60* over (5) Northern Kentucky
March 7, 2023		Indiana Farmers Coliseum • Indianapolis, Indiana	Championship	W 73–61 over (1) Green Bay

== Postseason ==
=== NCAA Tournament History ===
Year	Seed	Round	Opponent	Result/Score
2008	#15	First Round	#2 Stanford	L 47-85
2010	#15	First Round	#2 Notre Dame	L 58-86
2023	#13	First Round	#4 Villanova	L 76-59

=== WNIT Tournament History ===
Year	Round	Opponent	Result/Score
2015	First Round	Michigan	L 50-72
2026	Second Round; Super 16	Monmouth; Cleveland State	W 74–68; TBD

=== WBI Tournament History ===
Year	Seed	Round	Opponent	Result/Score
2011	#1	First Round; Second Round	#8 IPFW #5 Chicago State	W 73–62; L 50–68
2021	#1	Quarterfinals; Semifinals; Championship	Manhattan; Stetson; Portland	W 68–55; W 64–54; W 67–64
2022		Quarterfinals; Semifinals; Championship	Northeastern; Nevada; Saint Mary's	W 73–60; W 58–50; L 73–80

== Championships ==
Regular season

- North Star Conference Team Championships (0):
- Mid-Continent Conference Team Championships (0):
- Horizon League Team Championships (0):

Tournament

- North Star Conference Team Championships (0):
- Mid-Continent Conference Team Championships (0):
- Horizon League Team Championships (3): 2008, 2010, 2023
