= 2022–23 Cleveland State Vikings women's basketball team =

American college basketball season

2022–23 Cleveland State Vikings women's basketball

Horizon League tournament champions

NCAA Tournament, First Round
- Conference: Horizon League
- Record: 30–5 (17–3 Horizon)
- Head coach: Chris Kielsmeier (5th season)
- Assistant coaches: Frozena Jerro; Desma Thomas Bateast; Bob Dunn
- Home arena: Wolstein Center

2022–23 Horizon League women's basketball standings
	Conf.				Overall
Team	W		L	PCT	W		L	PCT
Green Bay	18	–	2	.900	28	–	5	.848
Cleveland State†	17	–	3	.850	30	–	4	.882
IUPUI	13	–	7	.650	17	–	13	.567
Youngstown State	13	–	7	.650	19	–	11	.633
Northern Kentucky	10	–	10	.500	17	–	14	.548
Purdue Fort Wayne	9	–	11	.450	14	–	19	.424
Oakland	8	–	12	.400	13	–	17	.433
Milwaukee	8	–	12	.400	11	–	19	.367
Wright State	6	–	14	.300	8	–	24	.250
Robert Morris	5	–	15	.250	11	–	19	.367
Detroit Mercy	3	–	17	.150	5	–	25	.167
† 2023 Horizon League Tournament winner As of March 17, 2023

The 2022–23 Cleveland State Vikings women's basketball team represented Cleveland State University in the 2022–23 NCAA Division I women's basketball season. The Vikings, led by fifth-year head coach Chris Kielsmeier, played their home games at the Wolstein Center and were members of the Horizon League. This was the 50th season of Cleveland State women's basketball.

== Previous season ==
The Vikings finished the 2021–22 season 23–9, 14–6 in Horizon League play to finish in a tie for 4th place. As a 4th seed in the Horizon League tournament, they defeated IUPUI in the quarterfinals and Oakland in the semifinals before advancing to the championship, where they lost to IUPUI. They were invited to the WBI, where they defeated Northeastern in the first round and Nevada in the semifinals, before losing to Saint Mary's in the championship game.

== Roster ==
2022–23 Cleveland State Vikings women's basketball team
Players
Coaches

Pos.	#	Name	Height	Year	Previous school	Hometown
G	0	Deja Williams	5 ft 6 in (1.68 m)	Jr	Long Beach Poly; Cal State Northridge	Long Beach, CA
G	2	Destiny Leo	5 ft 10 in (1.78 m)	Jr	North	Willowick, OH
G	4	Julia Hintz	5 ft 8 in (1.73 m)	Sr	New Berlin Eisenhower	New Berlin, WI
F	10	Jordana Reisma	6 ft 3 in (1.91 m)	Fr	Brown Deer	Brown Deer, WI
C	11	Aminata Ly	6 ft 4 in (1.93 m)	RS Jr	Green Forest Christian Academy (GA)	Dakar, Portugal
G	12	Sara Guerreiro	5 ft 10 in (1.78 m)	Jr	South Florida	Seixal, Portugal
G	13	Barbara Zieniewska	6 ft 0 in (1.83 m)	GS		Sokołów Podlaski, Poland
F	15	Brittni Moore	5 ft 10 in (1.78 m)	Sr	White Station; UT Martin	Memphis, TN
G	20	Shadiya Thomas	5 ft 8 in (1.73 m)	Jr	Cypress Ranch; Tyler JC	Cypress, TX
F	22	Faith Burch	6 ft 1 in (1.85 m)	RS Fr	Harding	Warren, OH
G	33	Carmen Villalobos	6 ft 1 in (1.85 m)	Sr	Segle XXI; Hartford	Cádiz, Spain
G	34	Gabriella Smith	5 ft 10 in (1.78 m)	Sr	Bolingbrook; Iowa Western	Bolingbrook, IL
F	35	Amele Ngwafang	6 ft 0 in (1.83 m)	Sr	Paint Branch; Radford	Silver Spring, MD

Head coach

- Chris Kielsmeier (Iowa State)

Assistant coach(es)

- Frozena Jerro (Arizona State)
- Desma Thomas Bateast (Miami (FL))
- Bob Dunn (Dayton)

Legend

- (C) Team captain
- (S) Suspended
- (I) Ineligible
- (W) Walk-on
- Injured
- Current redshirt

Roster

== Schedule ==
Date time, TV	Rank^{#}	Opponent^{#}	Result	Record	Site (attendance) city, state
Exhibition
October 25, 2022*; 2:00 p.m.		Ursuline College	W 76–43		Wolstein Center; Cleveland, OH
Regular season
November 7, 2022*; 12:00 p.m., ESPN+		at No. 8 Iowa State	L 54–87	0–1	Hilton Coliseum (9,556); Ames, IA
November 12, 2022*; 12:30 p.m., ESPN+		Hofstra	W 62–46	1–1	Wolstein Center (189); Cleveland, OH
November 15, 2022*; 8:00 p.m., FloSports		at DePaul	W 90–83 ^{OT}	2–1	Wintrust Arena (1,109); Chicago, IL
November 19, 2022*; 2:00 p.m.		at Niagara	Postponed		Gallagher Center; Lewiston, NY
November 23, 2022*; 4:00 p.m., ESPN+		Georgia State; Viking Invitational	W 57–53	3–1	Wolstein Center (164); Cleveland, OH
November 25, 2022*; 4:00 p.m., ESPN+		Bellarmine; Viking Invitational	W 76–59	4–1	Wolstein Center (222); Cleveland, OH
November 26, 2022*; 4:00 p.m., ESPN+		St. Bonaventure; Viking Invitational	W 64–40	5–1	Wolstein Center (163); Cleveland, OH
December 2, 2022; 7:00 p.m., ESPN+		Oakland	W 77–54	6–1 (1–0)	Wolstein Center (374); Cleveland, OH
December 4, 2022; 2:00 p.m., ESPN+		Detroit Mercy	W 86–30	7–1 (2–0)	Wolstein Center (173); Cleveland, OH
December 8, 2022*; 11:00 a.m.		at Central Michigan	W 86–55	8–1	McGuirk Arena (3,826); Mount Pleasant, MI
December 11, 2022*; 5:00 p.m.		at Akron	W 76–58	9–1	James A. Rhodes Arena (468); Akron, OH
December 19, 2022*; 6:30 p.m., BallerTV		vs. Lindenwood; Las Vegas Holiday Hoops Classic	W 72–45	10–1	South Point Arena; Enterprise, NV
December 20, 2022*; 6:30 p.m., BallerTV		vs. Campbell; Las Vegas Holiday Hoops Classic	W 59–47	11–1	South Point Arena; Enterprise, NV
December 29, 2022; 5:15 p.m., ESPN+		at Youngstown State	W 77–68	12–1 (3–0)	Beeghly Center (2,786); Youngstown, OH
December 31, 2022; 12:00 p.m., ESPN+		at Robert Morris	W 70–52	13–1 (4–0)	UPMC Events Center (267); Moon Township, PA
January 6, 2023; 7:00 p.m., ESPN+		Purdue Fort Wayne	W 74–56	14–1 (5–0)	Wolstein Center (241); Cleveland, OH
January 8, 2023; 2:00 p.m., ESPN+		IUPUI	W 92–58	15–1 (6–0)	Wolstein Center (209); Cleveland, OH
January 12, 2023; 7:00 p.m., ESPN+		Milwaukee	W 81–50	16–1 (7–0)	Wolstein Center (448); Cleveland, OH
January 14, 2023; 2:00 p.m., ESPN+		Green Bay	L 65–82	16–2 (7–1)	Wolstein Center (393); Cleveland, OH
January 20, 2023; 6:00 p.m., ESPN+		at Wright State	W 103–72	17–2 (8–1)	Nutter Center (1,029); Dayton, OH
January 22, 2023; 1:00 p.m., ESPN+		at Northern Kentucky	L 69–73	17–3 (8–2)	Truist Arena (1,010); Highland Heights, KY
January 26, 2023; 7:00 p.m., ESPN+		at Detroit Mercy	W 107–65	18–3 (9–2)	Calihan Hall (189); Detroit, MI
January 28, 2023; 2:00 p.m., ESPN+		at Oakland	W 72–51	19–3 (10–2)	Athletics Center O'rena (400); Rochester, MI
February 2, 2023; 11:00 a.m., ESPN+		Robert Morris	W 61–43	20–3 (11–2)	Wolstein Center (2,637); Cleveland, OH
February 4, 2023; 2:00 p.m., ESPN+		Youngstown State	W 81–48	21–3 (12–2)	Wolstein Center (575); Cleveland, OH
February 7, 2023*; 2:00 p.m., ESPN+		Chicago State	W 88–49	22–3	Wolstein Center (221); Cleveland, OH
February 11, 2023; 2:00 p.m., ESPN+		at IUPUI	W 83–59	23–3 (13–2)	The Jungle (425); Indianapolis, IN
February 13, 2023; 7:00 p.m., ESPN+		at Purdue Fort Wayne	W 73–63	24–3 (14–2)	Hilliard Gates Sports Center (470); Fort Wayne, IN
February 18, 2023; 2:00 p.m., ESPN3		Wright State	W 87–49	26–3 (16–2)	Wolstein Center (382); Cleveland, OH
February 23, 2023; 6:30 p.m., ESPN+		at Green Bay	L 49–64	26–4 (16–3)	Kress Events Center (1,964); Green Bay, WI
February 25, 2023; 2:00 p.m., ESPN3		at Milwaukee	W 63–56	27–4 (17–3)	Klotsche Center (609); Milwaukee, WI
Horizon League Women's Tournament
March 2, 2023; 5:30 p.m., ESPN+	(2)	(7) Milwaukee; Quarterfinals	W 65–52	28–4	Wolstein Center (1,276); Cleveland, OH
March 6, 2023; 2:30 p.m., ESPN+	(2)	vs. (5) Northern Kentucky; Semifinals	W 63–60 ^{OT}	29–4	Indiana Farmers Coliseum; Indianapolis, IN
March 7, 2023; 12:00 p.m., ESPNU	(2)	vs. (1) Green Bay; Championship	W 73–61	30–4	Indiana Farmers Coliseum; Indianapolis, IN
NCAA women's tournament
March 18, 2023*; 5:00 p.m., ESPNU	(13 G2)	at (4 G2) No. 10 Villanova; First Round	L 59–76	30–5	Finneran Pavilion (6,871); Villanova, PA
*Non-conference game. ^{#}Rankings from AP Poll. (#) Tournament seedings in parentheses. G2=Greenville 2. All times are in Eastern.

== Rankings ==
Ranking movements Legend: ██ Increase in ranking ██ Decrease in ranking — = Not ranked RV = Received votes
	Week																				
Poll	Pre	1	2	3	4	5	6	7	8	9	10	11	12	13	14	15	16	17	18	19	Final
AP	—	—*	—	—	—	—	—	—	—	—	—	—	—	—	RV	RV	RV	—	—	—	Not released
Coaches	—	—*	—^	—	—	—	—	—	—	—	RV	RV	—	—	—	—	RV	—	—	RV	

*The preseason and week 1 polls were the same.
^Coaches did not release a week 2 poll.

== See also ==
- 2022–23 Cleveland State Vikings men's basketball team
