= Chris Kielsmeier =

American basketball coach

Current position
- Title: Head coach
- Team: Texas State
- Conference: Pac-12
- Record: 0–0 (–)

Biographical details
- Education: Iowa State

Coaching career (HC unless noted)
- 1999–2000: Howard Payne (assistant)
- 2000–2008: Howard Payne
- 2008–2018: Wayne State
- 2018–2026: Cleveland State
- 2026–present: Texas State

Head coaching record
- Overall: 596–196 (.753)
- Tournaments: 0–1 (NCAA DI); 2–1 (WNIT); 5–1 (WBI)

Accomplishments and honors

Championships
- NCAA DIII Tournament (2008); WBI (2021); Horizon League tournament (2023); Horizon League regular season (2024)

Awards
- WBCA DIII National Coach of the Year (2008); Horizon League Coach of the Year (2024)

Chris Kielsmeier (born 1975 or 1976) is the women's basketball coach for Texas State University since 2026. He began his coaching career at Howard Payne University in 1999 as an assistant coach. As their women's basketball coach from 2000 to 2008, his team won the American Southwest Conference Championship Tournament thrice. Upon winning the 2008 NCAA Division III women's basketball tournament, the university had their first title in team sports since leaving the National Association of Intercollegiate Athletics. After receiving the WBCA National Coach of the Year Award for Division III schools in 2008, Kielsmeier had 179 wins and 44 losses before leaving for Wayne State College that year.

At Wayne State from 2008 to 2018, Kielsmeier had 237 wins and 72 losses while receiving two Coach of the Year awards as part of the Northern Sun Intercollegiate Conference. During this time period, his team won the Northern Sun women's basketball tournament twice and reached the Elite Eight during the 2012 NCAA Division II women's basketball tournament. With Cleveland State, his team had their first ever postseason title when they won the 2021 Women's Basketball Invitational. The following year, Cleveland State were second at the 2022 WBI. In 2023, Kielsmeier's team were the Horizon League women's basketball tournament winners and appeared in the first round of the NCAA Division I women's basketball tournament. The school competed in the first round of the 2024 Women's Basketball Invitation Tournament.

== Early life and education ==
Kielsmeier was born in Ames, Iowa during the 1970s. For his post-secondary education, he attended Iowa State University in the 1990s. During this time period, he completed a sport management degree at Iowa State. Kielsmeier also worked on their women's basketball team for an internship.

== Career ==
=== Howard Payne ===
Kielsmeier continued his women's basketball career in 1999 with Howard Payne University as an assistant coach. The following year, he became their coach. From 2005 to 2008, Kielsmeier's team won the American Southwest Conference Championship Tournament thrice.

During this time period, Howard Payne were first in the 2008 NCAA Division III women's basketball tournament. With their 2008 victory, Kielsmeier and Howard Payne had their first Division III title in women's basketball. It was also the university's first title in team sports after they left the NAIA. Upon leaving the university that year, he had 179 wins and 44 losses.

=== Wayne State College ===
In 2008, Kielsmeier became the women's basketball coach for Wayne State College. His team won the Northern Sun women's basketball tournament in 2010 and 2012. During the 2012 NCAA Division II women's basketball tournament, Kielsmeier's players reached the Elite Eight. While at Wayne State, he was on the board of directors for the Women's Basketball Coaches Association during the late 2010s. Kielsmeier had 237 wins and 72 losses upon leaving the college in 2018.

=== Cleveland State ===
Kielsmeir joined Cleveland State University as their women's basketball coach in 2018. At the Women's Basketball Invitational, Cleveland State had their first ever postseason title as the 2021 winners with Kielsmeier. His players were second at the 2022 edition of the WBI. The following year, Cleveland State and Kielsmeier were the 2023 Horizon League women's basketball tournament winners. They appeared in the first round of the 2023 NCAA Division I women's basketball tournament. Cleveland State competed in the first round during the 2024 Women's Basketball Invitation Tournament. In 8 seasons with Cleveland State, Kielsmeier had a record of 180 wins and 80 losses.

=== Texas State ===
In 2026, Kielsmeier was named the new head coach of Texas State University.

== Honors and personal life ==
As part of the ASC, Kielsmeier was the co-winner of the West Division Coach of the Year award in 2005 with Shanna Briggs. He solely won this women's basketball award in 2007 and 2008. With Howard Payne, he received the WBCA National Coach of the Year Award for Division III schools in 2008. Additional Coach of the Year awards Kielsmeier received that year were from D3hoops.com and Women's Division III News.

While competing in the Northern Sun Intercollegiate Conference with Wayne State, Kielsmeier was the women's basketball Coach of the Year in 2010 and 2012. In the Horizon League, he was Coach of the Year during 2024. Kielsmeier and his players for the 2007–08 season joined the HPU Sports Hall of Fame in 2009. He was solely inducted into this hall of fame by Howard Payne in 2014. Kielsmeier received medical treatment when he was sick with COVID-19 during March 2020.
