= Superconference =

Athletic conference

A superconference (also super-conference or super conference) is an athletic conference noted for its large number of members, significant revenue generation, and substantial power that it wields in comparison to at least some of its counterpart conferences. The term is typically used in reference to college athletics in the United States. Because superconferences are emergent and not clearly defined, the term is often used in a hypothetical and speculative way, although one definition of American college superconferences posits that they must form from leagues that were Automatic Qualifying (AQ) conferences during the era of the now-defunct Bowl Championship Series, possess a significant multi-network television deal, and at least consider expanding to the "magic number" of 16 members. The term, though used infrequently before 2010, has historical roots in the proposed "Airplane Conference" of 1959, the Metro Conference's 1990 plan to expand to 16 members, the expansion of the Western Athletic Conference (WAC; now known as the United Athletic Conference) to 16 members in 1996, and the creation of 12-team, two-division conferences with football championship games by the Southeastern Conference (SEC), Big 12 Conference, and Atlantic Coast Conference (ACC) in the 1990s and 2000s. Since major conference realignment began in 2010, the term has been used to describe the expanding ACC, Big 12, Big Ten, Pac-12, and SEC conferences.

== Background ==
=== The proposed "Airplane Conference" (1959) ===
Map of the proposed "Airplane Conference"

Although the term was not used at the time, perhaps the first superconference was the proposed "Airplane Conference" of 1959. Suggested by University of Pittsburgh Athletic Director Tom Hamilton, and made possible by the jet age, the proposed 12-team football conference would have stretched across the United States like the professional and increasingly popular competitor National Football League. It would have consisted of five former members of the Pacific Coast Conference (Washington, California, USC, UCLA and Stanford), the three largest service academies (Army, Navy, and Air Force), and four eastern universities (Notre Dame, Pitt, Penn State, Syracuse).

The conference would, Sports Illustrated said, be the strongest in football in the country; the schools saw the others as academic and athletic peers. As the schools were independent after the dissolving of the Pacific Coast Conference, no conference schedule would be disrupted, and playing around the country appealed to the service academies. The "Airplane Conference" failed to form after the service academies backed out because of the Pentagon's opposition to the idea.

=== "Developing the Super Conference" (1990) ===
In 1990, Raycom Sports created a 240-page booklet for the now-defunct Metro Conference entitled "Developing the Super Conference". The booklet outlined Raycom's plan to make the Metro competitive with the major conferences of the day (chiefly the SEC, ACC, Southwest, Big Eight, Big Ten, and Pac-10), which was based on adding new members that were desirable to the Metro in terms of everything from tapping new television markets and increasing the conference's footprint to preserving regional rivalries and exhibiting "institutional compatibility". Raycom's plan was for the Metro, which consisted of eight members in 1990 (Cincinnati, Florida State, Louisville, Memphis State, South Carolina, Southern Miss, Tulane, and Virginia Tech), to double in size to 16, sponsor football for the first time, and then split into either two divisions of eight or four divisions of four. The eight teams named as targets in the booklet were Boston College, East Carolina, Miami, Pitt, Rutgers, Syracuse, Temple, and West Virginia, and Raycom's plan was so intriguing to them that the presidents and athletic directors from all eight met with their Metro Conference counterparts in Dallas in the spring of 1990 to discuss the possibility of creating such a 16-team conference.

The Metro Conference never achieved the substantial expansion outlined by the booklet; in 1991, Florida State joined the ACC, South Carolina moved into the SEC, and Boston College, Miami, Pitt, Syracuse, and Virginia Tech began playing football in the Big East. However, Raycom's plan established the blueprint for future superconference creation by emphasizing the importance of using conference expansion to add major markets and increase the conference footprint by expanding into new regions of the country and ultimately securing a significant number of the television households in the United States. According to former Louisville athletic director Bill Olsen, much of the move toward superconferences that has occurred since 2010 is reminiscent of the Metro Conference's plans and ambitions. The Metro itself ultimately dissolved in 1995, when its remnants joined a number of former members of the Great Midwest to form the football-sponsoring Conference USA (C-USA).

=== Penn State, Notre Dame, and the proposed "Eastern Seaboard League" (1990) ===
Also in 1990, the concept of the superconference came into the national spotlight as Penn State joined the Big Ten as its 11th member. That same year, Notre Dame reached its own television deal with NBC instead of continuing its participation in the College Football Association's contract with CBS. Both of these moves greatly concerned schools with independent football programs and resulted in discussions among Eastern independents concerning the creation of a proposed "Eastern Seaboard League" (ESL). According to a 1990 Sports Illustrated article, the ten schools most likely to join the ESL were Miami, Boston College, Florida State, South Carolina, West Virginia, Virginia Tech, Temple, Rutgers, Syracuse, and Pitt. The ESL was never formed, but the Big East decided to sponsor football starting in 1991 and added Miami, West Virginia, Virginia Tech, Temple, and Rutgers as conference members.

=== The SEC expands to 12 (1991) ===
South Carolina, on the other hand, joined the SEC in 1991 along with Arkansas, giving it an unprecedented 12 members and the ability to play a football championship game. Perhaps the first existing superconference, the newly enlarged SEC took advantage of a little-known NCAA rule that allowed a conference of at least 12 teams to form two divisions and play a championship game at the end of the season between the two division winners, with that game not counting against NCAA limits on regular-season contests. The rule had originally been adopted by the NCAA in 1987 to benefit two Division II leagues, the Pennsylvania State Athletic Conference and Central Intercollegiate Athletic Association (which respectively had 14 and 12 members at the time), but the SEC realized that using the same conference structure for its purposes would allow it to increase its television revenue.

=== The Big 12 is formed (1996) ===
The formation of the Big 12 was foreshadowed by a proposed complete merger of the Big Eight with the Southwest Conference (SWC) in 1990, which ultimately failed to materialize largely due to a lack of interest by Texas at the time. In 1996, the Big 12 was created when all eight members of the Big Eight were joined by four members of the SWC (Texas, Texas A&M, Texas Tech, and Baylor). Following the example of the SEC, the Big 12 established two divisions of six teams and its own football championship game, becoming the second Automatic Qualifying (AQ) conference to do so. According to Blair Kerkhoff of The Kansas City Star, the Big 12 was the first conference to be established primarily for the purpose of securing lucrative media contracts, as it strategically combined the television markets represented by Texas and the Big Eight states (which each accounted for about seven percent of the national market in 1996).

=== The WAC reaches 16 (1996) ===
The first major Division I conference to have 16 members was the WAC, which had decided to expand beyond 10 in April 1994. At that time, the SWC was preparing to disband, and the College Football Association, which had loosely controlled TV rights for all Division I-A (now FBS) conferences except the Big Ten and Pac-10, was disintegrating. The WAC publicly announced plans to expand to 12 teams, giving it the right to add a football championship game. However, the WAC's options increased when the collapse of the SWC left four Texas schools searching for a new affiliation. In the end, the WAC added six new schools in 1996, bringing its ranks to 16.

The 16-team WAC was immediately beset with internal and external issues. It now stretched from Hawaii to Oklahoma and Eastern Texas, spanning four time zones and nearly 4,000 miles (6,400 km). The three new Texas schools—Rice, SMU, and TCU—were all located in large TV markets, but added little value to the WAC because of the dominance of Texas and Texas A&M in the state's college sports scene.

Karl Benson, commissioner of the WAC during this period, recalled in 2011,

There were schools that never bought into the 16 teams. The 10 original WAC members never had buy-in from all the athletic directors and some of the high-profile coaches. They were critics, not supporters. The other thing that kept it hard to manage — the presidents never had a natural North-South or East-West division. There weren't eight teams that naturally fit either East-West or North-South. As a result, we couldn't come up with permanent divisions.

The WAC tried to manage its unwieldy geography by dividing itself into four "pods" of four teams each. While this appeared to be viable from the outside, the structure limited the development of conference rivalries because each team's conference games in football (except the three within its pod) would rotate among the other pods. By spring 1998, BYU and Utah wanted to have two set eight-team divisions, which would have forced some teams into an unnatural divisional alignment. New Mexico and UTEP were willing to make such a move, but Air Force and UNLV were bitterly opposed, with Benson recalling in 2011 that Air Force threatened to go independent. Shortly thereafter, the presidents of Air Force, BYU, Colorado State, Utah, and Wyoming met at Denver International Airport and agreed to break from the WAC and form a new league. They invited New Mexico, San Diego State, and UNLV to join them, and this group of eight broke away to form the Mountain West Conference, which began play in the 1999–2000 school year.

=== The ACC expands to 12 and the Big East reaches 16 (2005) ===
In May 2003, the ACC presidents voted in favor of expanding from nine to 12 members, initially engaging Boston College, Miami, and Syracuse in membership talks. In June, the ACC extended formal membership invitations to Miami and Virginia Tech, both of whom accepted and officially joined the conference the next month. Miami and Virginia Tech began play in the ACC in 2004. In October 2003, Boston College was offered and accepted an invitation to become the ACC's 12th member, and once it officially joined the conference in 2005 the ACC was able to split into two divisions and create a football championship game.

In response to the loss of three of its members, the Big East added five new members from C-USA, three that played football (Cincinnati, Louisville, and South Florida) and two that did not (DePaul and Marquette). These additions allowed the Big East to expand to 16 total members, although it took the promotion of UConn (traditionally a non-football school) to the ranks of the conference's football members to retain the eight teams needed to preserve its status as an AQ conference. According to Bleacher Report writer Chuck Platt, the 2005 realignment accentuated and exacerbated the already-existing tensions between the "football" and "non-football" schools in the Big East, ultimately contributing to the demise of the conference.

== Expansion since 2010 ==
Since 2010, speculation about emergent superconferences in American college sports has been rampant and closely connected with conference realignment, with many writers believing that Division I FBS football will eventually be dominated by four or five superconferences consisting of 16 schools each. Speculation consistently includes the Big Ten, Pac-12, and SEC as probable eventual superconferences, while both the ACC and Big 12 are sometimes rumored to eventually evolve into superconferences themselves. According to ESPN The Magazine writer Ryan McGee, a superconference is defined by three major attributes: firstly, it is formed from an already-existing BCS Automatic Qualifying (AQ) conference (at the time the article was written in 2011, either the ACC, SEC, Big East, Big Ten, Big 12, or Pac-12 conference). Secondly, it is in possession of a significant television deal with multiple different networks. And thirdly, it is at least willing to expand to the "magic number" of 16 member institutions. The following sections detail expansions by AQ conferences that have been contributing to speculation that they are becoming superconferences.

=== The Big Ten and the Pac-10 expand to 12 (2011) ===
After the Big Ten's initial announcement that it was looking at expansion in December 2009, rumors about possible expansion targets and the possibility that the conference might expand to as many as 14 or 16 teams circulated into May 2010. On June 11, 2010, Nebraska applied for membership in the Big Ten and was unanimously approved as the conference's 12th school. Its membership became effective July 1, 2011. Big Ten officials later stated that they had no plans to expand beyond 12 teams in the near future.

On June 7, 2010, the Pac-10 approved expansion plans and issued invitations to six prospective schools, all from the Big 12: Colorado, Oklahoma, Oklahoma State, Texas, Texas A&M, and Texas Tech. On June 10, 2010, the Pac-10 announced that Colorado would be joining the conference in 2012. For several days, rumors circulated that Texas, Texas A&M, Texas Tech, Oklahoma, and Oklahoma State might follow suit and join the Pac-10 as soon as June 15, 2010, although Texas A&M was also considering a move to the SEC. On June 14, Texas rejected the offer to join the Pac-10, and shortly thereafter Oklahoma, Oklahoma State, Texas A&M, and Texas Tech pledged to stay in the Big 12 with Texas. On June 17, Utah accepted an invitation to join the Pac-10 as its 12th member, and on September 21, Colorado and the Big 12 reached an agreement to allow Colorado to join the Pac-10 a year earlier in 2011. As a result, Colorado and Utah revived a long-dormant rivalry with each other, which has since been dubbed the "Rumble in the Rockies".

=== The SEC expands to 14 (2012) ===
In 2011, the SEC announced the addition of Big 12 members Texas A&M and Missouri as its 13th and 14th members, both of which officially joined the conference on July 1, 2012. These moves set off the second wave of major conference realignment, as the Big 12 responded by adding TCU (left out of the initial 1996 expansion of the Big Eight Conference into the Big 12) and West Virginia in 2012 to retain a total of ten members. Several other schools were rumored as potential expansion candidates for the SEC, but the conference did not expand beyond 14 teams until the 2020s conference realignment.

=== The ACC and the Big Ten expand beyond 12 (2013–2014) ===
In light of realignment rumors, the ACC voted unanimously to raise its exit fees to $20 million on September 13, 2011. On September 18, Big East members Pitt and Syracuse officially applied to join the ACC and were accepted later that day, giving the conference 14 members. Both schools ultimately negotiated a buyout that enabled them to join the ACC in 2013. On September 12, 2012, the ACC announced that Notre Dame would become the conference's 15th member in all the sports it sponsored except for football, although as part of the agreement the football team will play five games against ACC opponents each season. There remained speculation regarding the timing of the change until March 12, 2013, when it was announced that the Big East would allow Notre Dame to leave for the ACC after the 2012–13 academic year. At the same time, the ACC also instituted an even larger increase in exit fees, set at three times the conference's annual operating budget (for 2012–13, the fee would be roughly $50 million).

In mid-November 2012, however, the landscape had changed, as ESPN reported that Maryland, a charter member of the ACC, was in "serious negotiations" to join the Big Ten. Big East member Rutgers was also reported to be in consideration to join the Big Ten at the same time. On November 19, the Maryland regents voted to accept the Big Ten's membership offer, and the Big Ten presidents unanimously approved Maryland's entry later that day. Maryland would officially join in July 2014. Rutgers announced the following day that it would also join the conference in 2014. In response, the ACC voted to accept Louisville as its 14th full member on November 28, 2012, a move that took effect in 2014 when Maryland left the conference.

In late May 2013, comments made in December 2012 by Ohio State's then-president Gordon Gee to the university's athletics council were made public. Media attention focused on remarks interpreted as slurs against Catholics and Notre Dame, plus digs at the Southeastern Conference, former Wisconsin football coach Bret Bielema, and the universities of Cincinnati, Kentucky, and Louisville. Gee soon resigned his post. However, his comments also included his thoughts on future conference expansion and realignment, with one remark specifically focusing on the superconference phenomenon: "I think we're moving precipitously toward about three or four superconferences of about 16 to 20 teams. And the possibility of them bolting from the NCAA is not unlikely."

=== 2021 SEC expansion, Big 12 response, and collapse of the Pac-12 ===
In July 2021, multiple media reports indicated that Big 12 mainstays Oklahoma and Texas had approached the SEC regarding a potential move to that conference. Many reports used the term "superconference" in reference to a notional 16-member SEC, and extensively speculated on the ramifications should Oklahoma and Texas join the SEC, with some commenting on the possibility that Gee's scenario of the biggest athletic programs leaving the NCAA could materialize. Several days after the initial report, the two schools notified the Big 12 that they would not extend the conference's grant of media rights beyond its planned expiration at the end of the 2024–25 school year, which was widely seen as the first step toward the schools' departure for the SEC. By the end of the month, both Oklahoma and Texas formally requested, received, and accepted invitations to join the SEC. While the invitations stated that Oklahoma and Texas would join the SEC in 2025, many media outlets believed that the schools would buy out their media rights and join earlier. These speculations proved to be true when the Big 12 announced in February 2023 that it had reached an agreement with Oklahoma and Texas on a 2024 departure date. The Big 12 would respond several weeks after the initial Oklahoma and Texas announcements by announcing that BYU, Cincinnati, Houston, and UCF would join no later than 2024; all would later be confirmed as 2023 arrivals. The expansion of the Big 12 continued in July 2023 with the announcement that Colorado would be returning to the conference in 2024 after a 13-year spell in the Pac-12. The move reignited speculation that the Big 12 would add more members, with likely targets being remaining schools in the Pac-12. On August 4, 2023, five Pac-12 schools announced their departure from the conference effective in 2024. three of which (Arizona, Arizona State, and Utah) moved to the Big 12.

=== The Big Ten and ACC expand to 18 (2022–2023) ===
In late June 2022, multiple media outlets began to report rumors that UCLA and USC were considering moving to the Big Ten from the Pac-12. On June 30, the Big Ten confirmed those reports and announced that the two schools would be joining the conference in 2024. The move will take effect after the expiration of the current Pac-12 media deal at the end of the 2023–2024 season and may lead to a more lucrative media deal for the Big Ten. In early August 2023, two additional Pac-12 schools, Oregon and Washington, announced their intention to join the Big Ten, also effective in 2024. In September 2023, two other Pac-12 schools, Stanford and California, as well as SMU, announced that they would join the ACC in 2024.

=== Gallery ===
==== ACC expansion and contraction ====
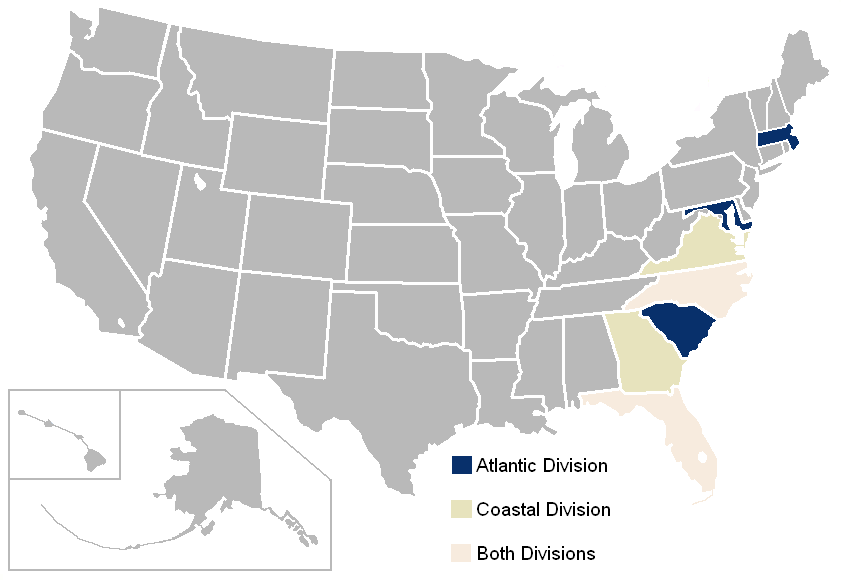
A map of the ACC as it existed from 2005 to 2013, with Atlantic (blue) and Coastal (tan) divisions.

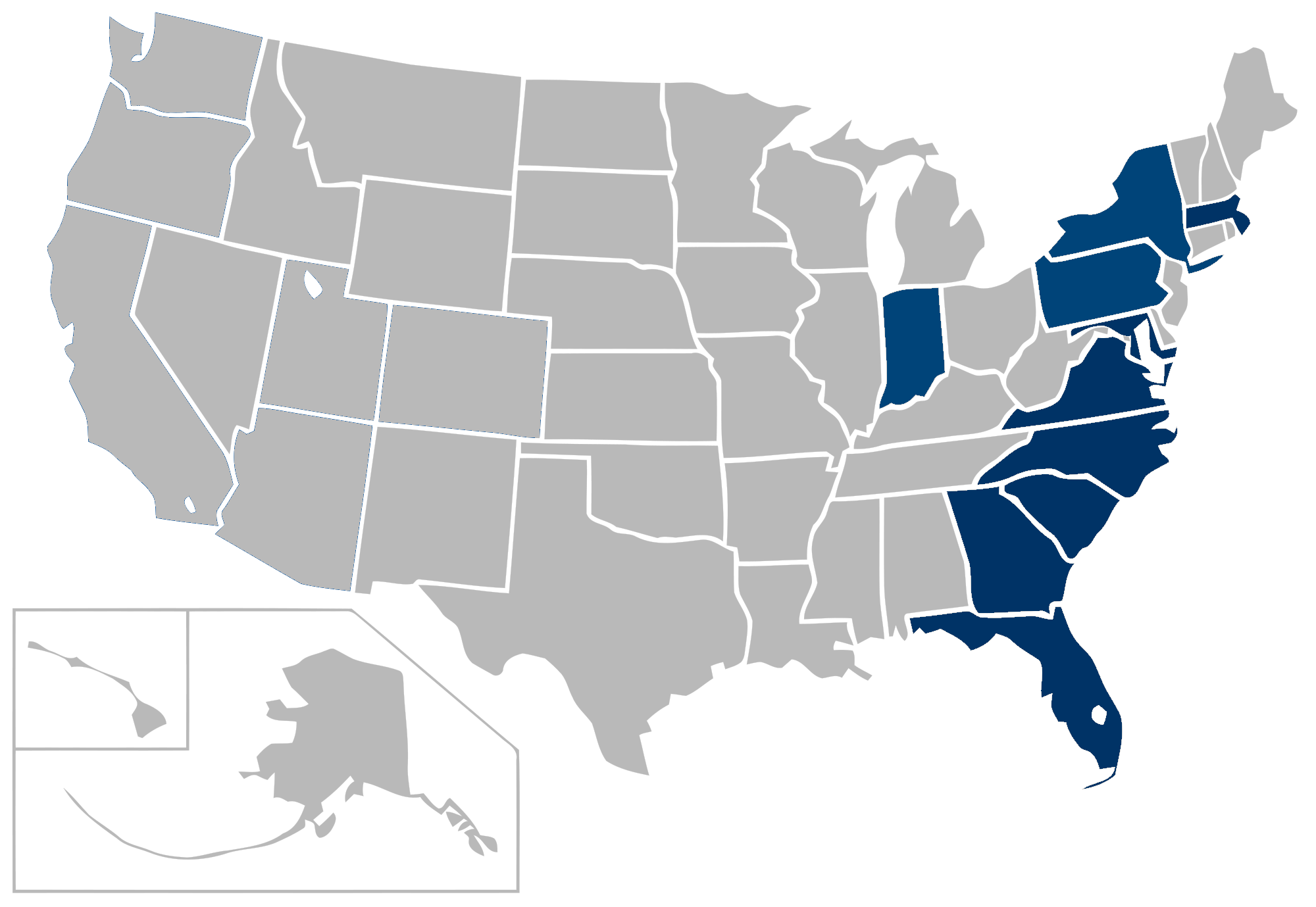
The all-sports ACC as it existed in 2013–14, after the additions of Syracuse and Pitt for all sports including football, and Notre Dame for non-football sports.

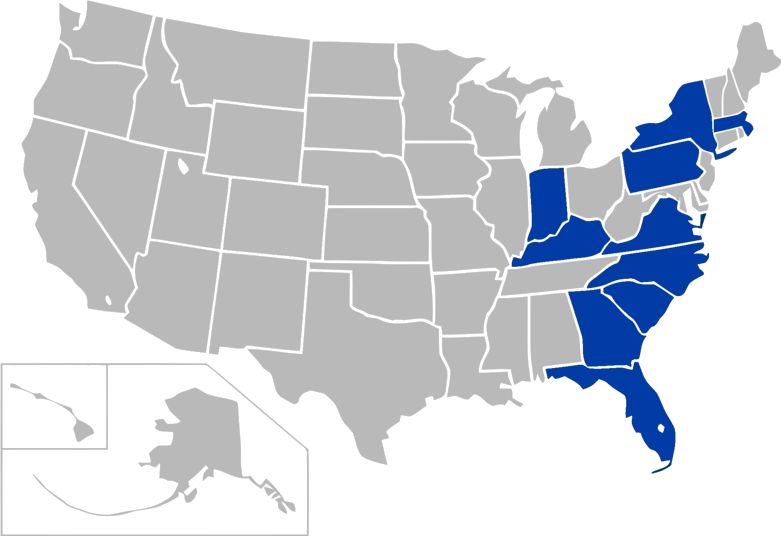
The ACC as it existed from the addition of Louisville in 2014 through 2024.

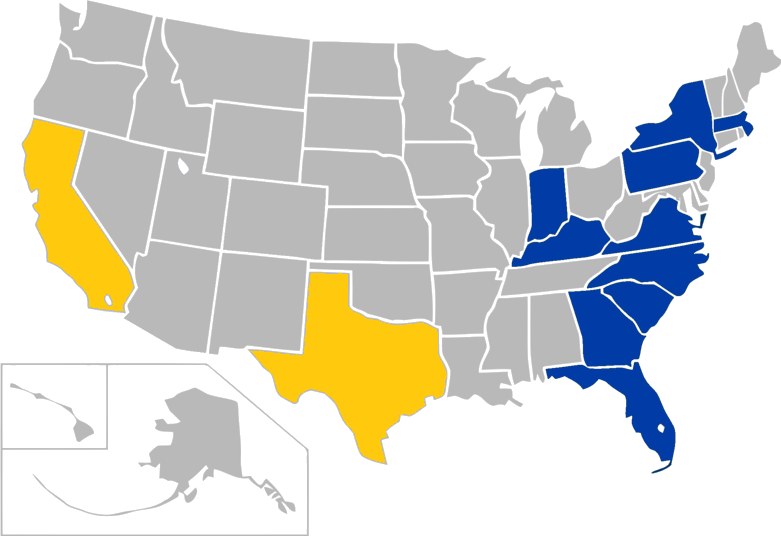
The ACC as it now exists, after the 2024 addition of California, SMU, and Stanford (in yellow).

==== Big 12 expansion and contraction ====
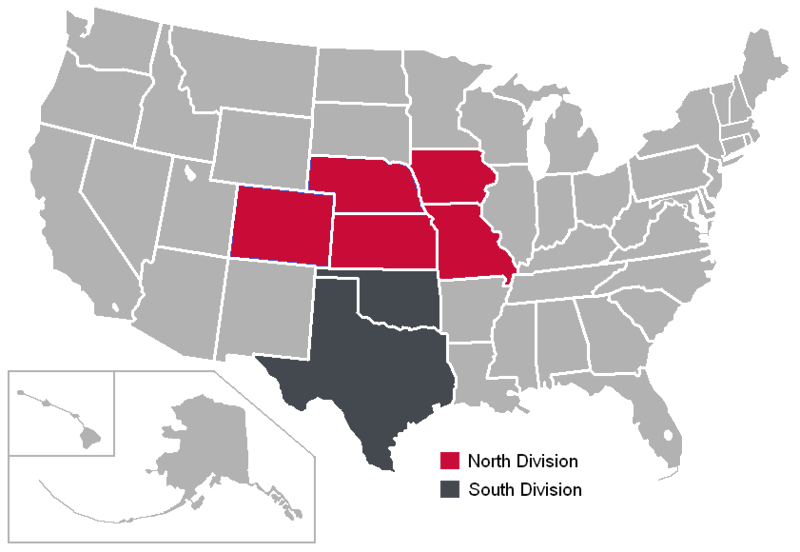
A map of the Big 12 as it existed from 1996 to 2011, with North (red) and South (grey) divisions

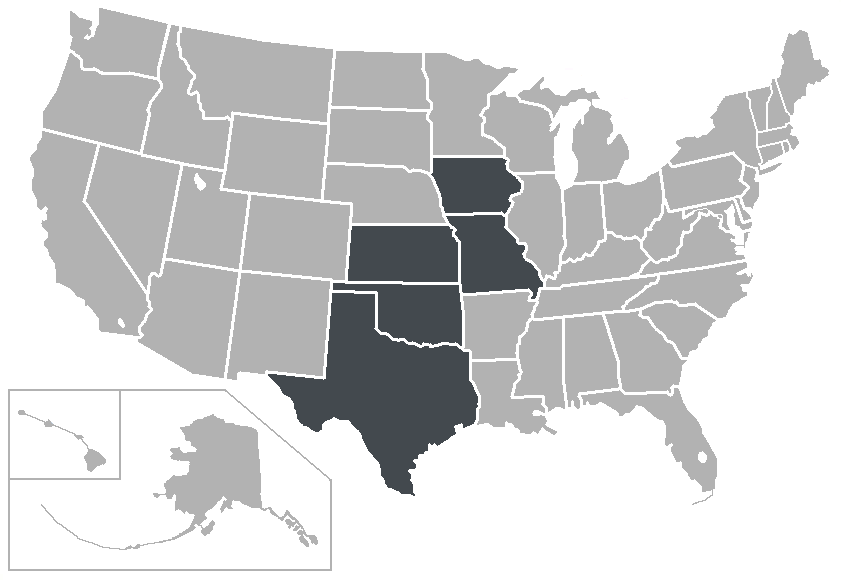
The Big 12 as it existed from 2011 to 2012, after the departures of Colorado and Nebraska

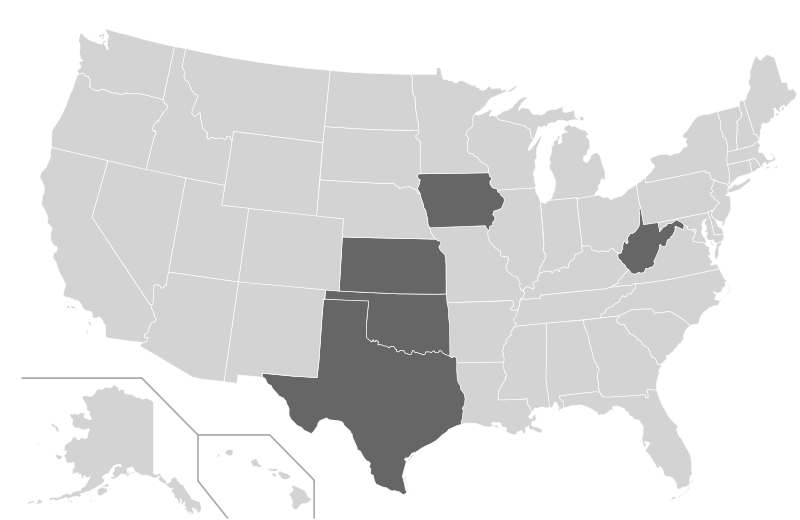
The Big 12 as it existed from 2012 to 2023, after the departures of Texas A&M and Missouri and the additions of TCU and West Virginia

The Big 12 as it existed for only the 2023–24 season, after the additions of BYU, Cincinnati, Houston, and UCF.

The Big 12 following the return of Colorado and addition of Arizona, Arizona State, and Utah in 2024.

==== Big Ten expansion ====
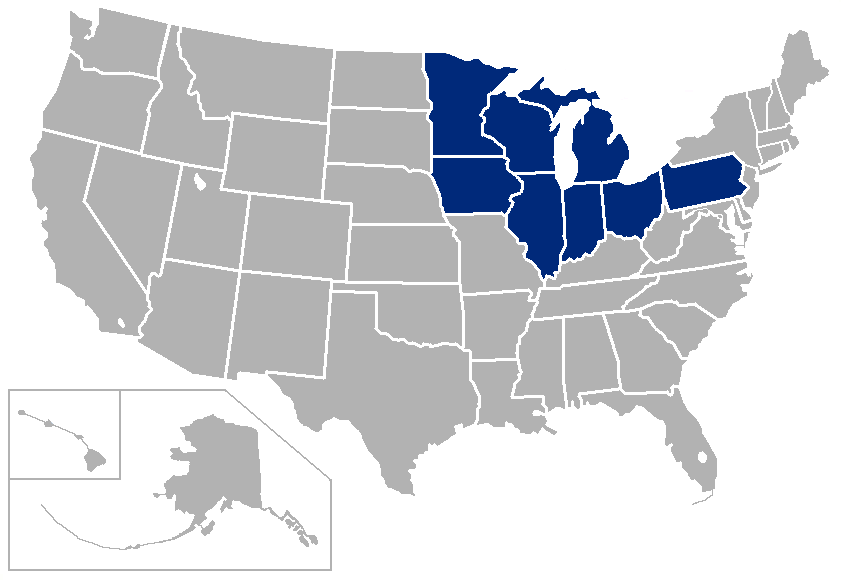
A map of the Big Ten as it existed between 1990 and 2011

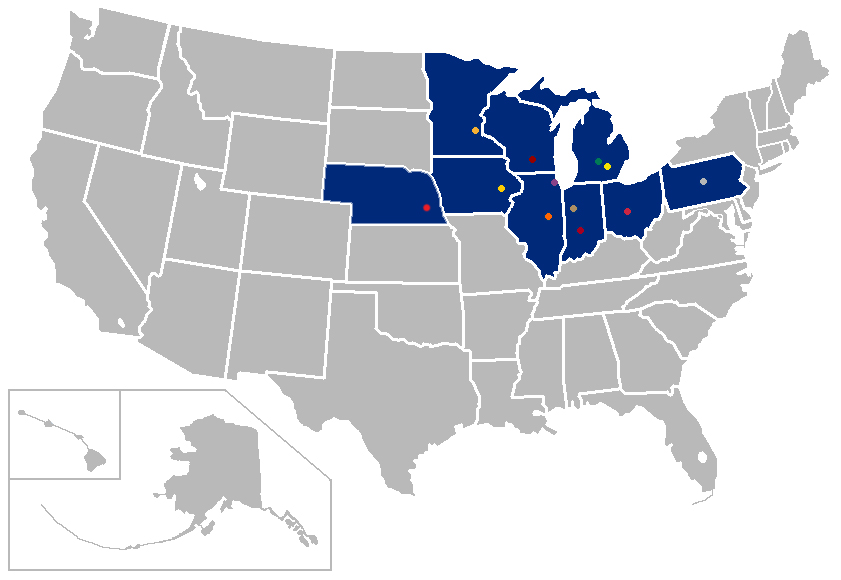
The Big Ten as it existed between 2011 and 2014, after the addition of Nebraska

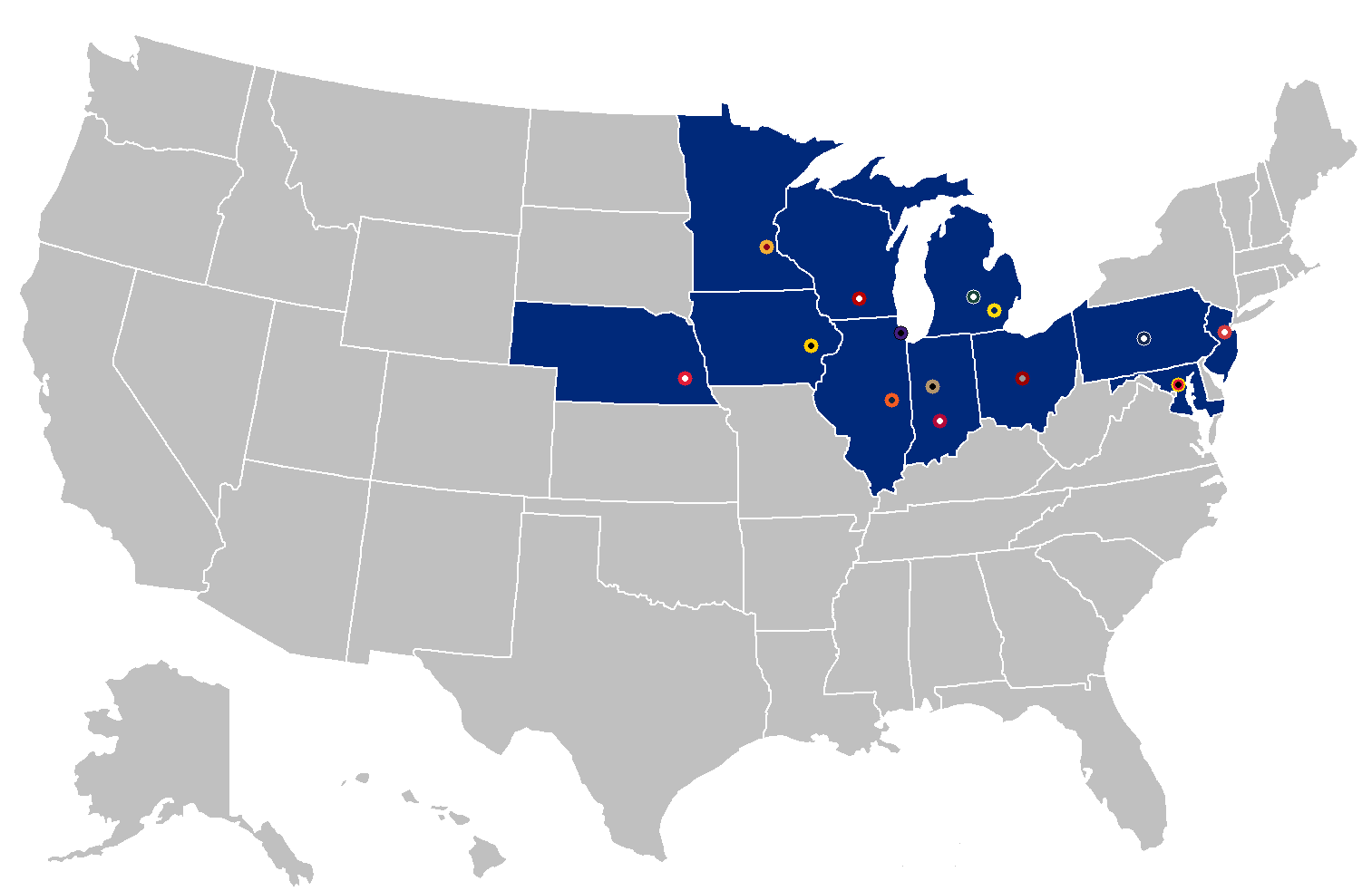
The Big Ten as it existed between 2014 and 2024, after the 2014 additions of Maryland and Rutgers

The Big Ten as it now exists, after the 2024 additions of Oregon, UCLA, USC, and Washington

==== Pac-10 / Pac-12 expansion and contraction ====
A map of the Pac-10 as it existed between 1978 and 2011

The Pac-12 as it existed from 2024 to 2026, after the departure of 10 of its former 12 members

==== SEC expansion ====
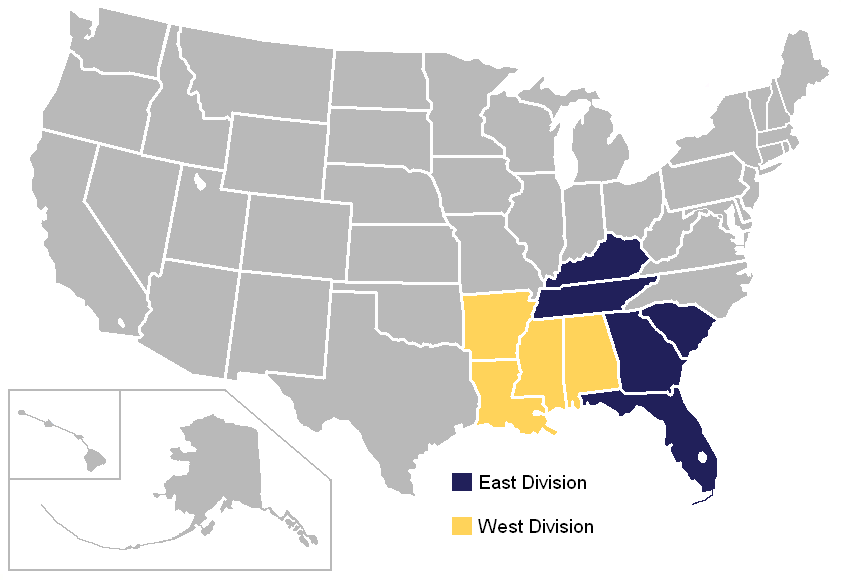
A map of the SEC as it existed between 1991 and 2012, with East (blue) and West (yellow) divisions.

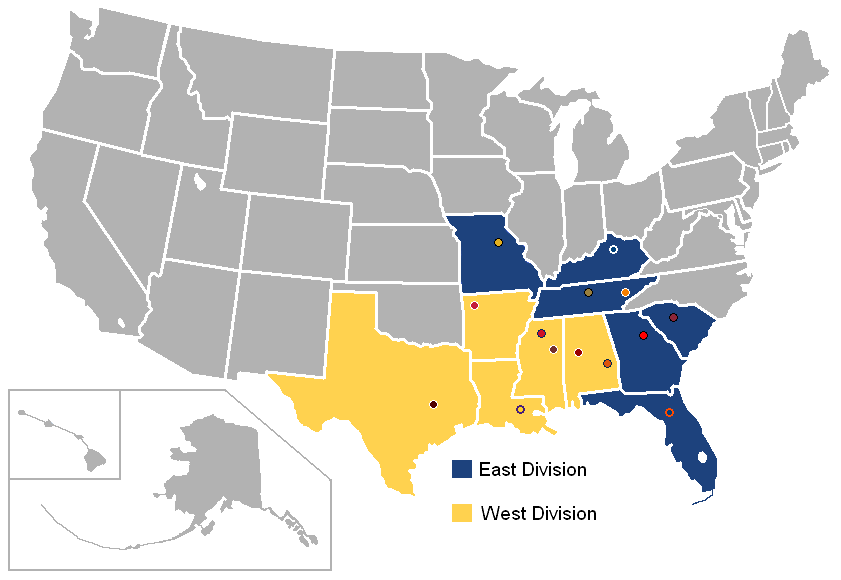
The SEC as it existed between 2012 and 2024, after the additions of Texas A&M and Missouri.

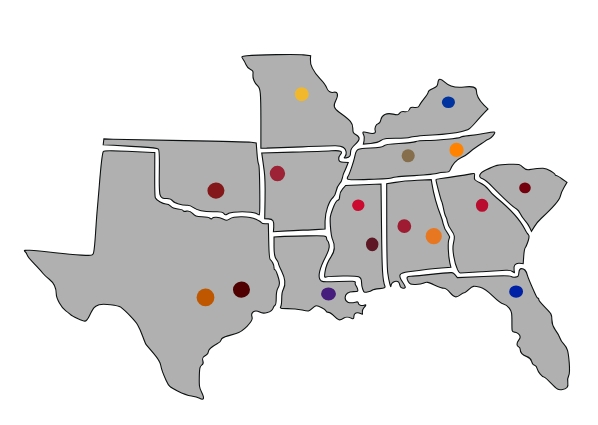
The SEC as it now exists, after the 2024 addition of Oklahoma and Texas, plus the elimination of football divisions.

== See also ==
- List of NCAA Division I conference changes before 2010
- List of NCAA Division I conference changes in the 2010s
- List of NCAA Division I conference changes in the 2020s
- 1996 NCAA conference realignment
- 2005 NCAA conference realignment
- 2010–2014 NCAA conference realignment
- 2021–2026 NCAA conference realignment
- Power conferences
