= North Star Conference =

Women's college sports conference

- Association: NCAA
- Founded: 1983
- Folded: 1992
- Division: Division I
- No. of teams: 15

Locations
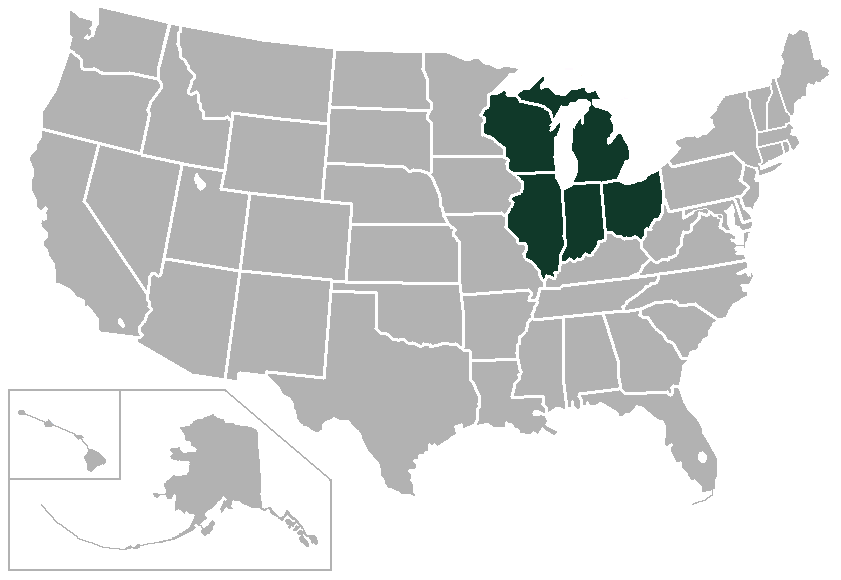

The North Star Conference or NSC was a women's conference in the NCAA. The conference existed from the 1983–84 school year through the 1991–92 school year. Originally announced in 1983, the conference was formed by charter members Butler, Dayton, DePaul, Detroit, Evansville, Loyola (Chicago), Notre Dame, and Xavier. Although the conference was to offer competition in cross country, softball, swimming, tennis, and volleyball, the conference was created primarily as a basketball conference. With the exception of Butler and Dayton, all charter members' women's basketball teams were already competing at the NCAA Division I level; Butler and Dayton upgraded their teams from NCAA Division II and commenced competition in the conference's second season. The conference was effectively absorbed by the Mid-Continent Conference (now known as The Summit League), as six of its final seven members moved their women's sports to that organization (the remaining member, Akron, moved all its sports for both sexes to the Mid-American Conference).

== Membership ==
- Akron 1988-1989 through 1991-1992
- Butler 1984-1985 through 1985-1986
- Cleveland State 1988-1989 through 1991-1992
- Dayton 1984-1985 through 1987-1988
- DePaul 1983-1984 through 1990-1991
- Detroit 1983-1984 through 1985-1986
- Evansville 1983-1984 through 1985-1986
- Illinois-Chicago 1988-1989 through 1991-1992
- Loyola (Illinois) 1983-1984 through 1985-1986
- Marquette 1986-1987 through 1988-1989
- Northern Illinois 1987-1988 through 1991-1992
- Notre Dame 1983-1984 through 1987-1988
- Valparaiso 1987-1988 through 1991-1992
- Wisconsin-Green Bay 1988-1989 through 1991-1992
- Wright State 1990-1991 through 1991-1992
- Xavier 1983-1984 through 1985-1986

== Commissioner ==
- Jean Lenti Ponsetto (1987–1989)
- Arnie Fielkow (1989–1991)
- Phyllis Holmes (1991–1992)

== Women's Basketball ==
=== Conference Champions ===
==== Regular season ====
Season	Teams	School
1984	6	Loyola (Illinois)
1985	8	Notre Dame
1986	8	Notre Dame
1987	4	DePaul
1988	6	DePaul
1989	8	Northern Illinois/DePaul
1990	7	Northern Illinois
1991	8	Wisconsin-Green Bay
1992	7	Wisconsin-Green Bay

=== Conference Tournament ===
Season	Teams	Champion
1989	8	DePaul
1990	7	Northern Illinois
1991	8	DePaul
1992	7	Northern Illinois

=== Honors ===
==== Coach of the Year ====
- 1983-84
- 1984-85 Mary DiStanislao, Notre Dame
- 1985-86 Mary DiStanislao, Notre Dame
- 1986-87
- 1987-88 Muffet McGraw, Notre Dame
- 1988-89 Jane Albright-Dieterle, Northern Illinois
- 1989-90 Jane Albright-Dieterle, Northern Illinois
- 1990-91
- 1991-92

==== Player of the Year ====
- 1983-84
- 1984-85
- 1985-86 Trena Keys, Notre Dame
- 1986-87 Trena Keys, Notre Dame
- 1987-88
- 1988-89
- 1989-90 Carol Owens, Northern Illinois
- 1990-91 Lisa Foss, Northern Illinois
- 1991-92

=== Attendance ===
Season	Teams	G/S	Attendance	P/G	Net	Total
1984	6	57	18,694	328	UP	1,329
1985	8	89	23,198	261	DN	2,767
1986	8	95	21,662	228	DN	1,536
1987	4	50	14,678	294	UP	1,224
1988	6	64	23,870	373	UP	9,192
1989	8	94	41,514	442	UP	17,644
1990	7	85	53,752	632	UP	16,336
1991	8	88	53,675	610	DN	77
1992	7	76	48,155	634	Up	18,195

== Women's Volleyball ==
=== Conference Champions ===
==== Regular season ====
- Season Number of Teams School
- 1983 6
- 1984 8
- 1985 8
- 1986 4
- 1987 6
- 1988 8 Northern Illinois
- 1989 7
- 1990 8
- 1991 7

=== Conference Tournament ===
Season	Teams	Champion
1988	8	Northern Illinois
1989	7	
1990	8	
1991	7	
