= 2022–23 Green Bay Phoenix women's basketball team =

American college basketball season

2022–23 Green Bay Phoenix women's basketball

Horizon League regular-season champions

WNIT, second round
- Conference: Horizon League
- Record: 28–6 (18–2 Horizon)
- Head coach: Kevin Borseth (11th, 20th overall season)
- Associate head coach: Megan Vogel
- Assistant coaches: Sarah Bronk; Carly Mohns; Patrick Bowlin
- Home arena: Kress Events Center

2022–23 Horizon League women's basketball standings
	Conf.				Overall
Team	W		L	PCT	W		L	PCT
Green Bay	18	–	2	.900	28	–	5	.848
Cleveland State†	17	–	3	.850	30	–	4	.882
IUPUI	13	–	7	.650	17	–	13	.567
Youngstown State	13	–	7	.650	19	–	11	.633
Northern Kentucky	10	–	10	.500	17	–	14	.548
Purdue Fort Wayne	9	–	11	.450	14	–	19	.424
Oakland	8	–	12	.400	13	–	17	.433
Milwaukee	8	–	12	.400	11	–	19	.367
Wright State	6	–	14	.300	8	–	24	.250
Robert Morris	5	–	15	.250	11	–	19	.367
Detroit Mercy	3	–	17	.150	5	–	25	.167
† 2023 Horizon League Tournament winner As of March 17, 2023

The 2022–23 Green Bay Phoenix women's basketball team represented the University of Wisconsin–Green Bay during the 2022–23 NCAA Division I women's basketball season. The Phoenix, led by Kevin Borseth in his 11th season in his second stint as head coach, and 20th overall, played their home games at the Kress Events Center in Green Bay, Wisconsin as members of the Horizon League. The leading scorer for the season was Sydney Levy, averaging 11.7 points per game, with Cassie Schiltz leading the team in rebounds per game at 5.1, and Bailey Butler as the team's assist leader at 4.1 per game. The Phoenix finished the season 28–5, 18–2 in Horizon League play, to finish in first place.

== Previous season ==
The Phoenix finished the 2021–22 season at 20–8 and 15–4 in Horizon League play, to finish in third place of the Horizon League regular season. As the #3 seed in the Horizon League tournament, they defeated #6 seed Milwaukee in the quarterfinals but were defeated in the semifinals by #4 seed Cleveland State. They received an at-large bid into the WNIT, where they were defeated by Minnesota in the first round.

== Roster ==
2022–23 Green Bay Phoenix women's basketball team
Players
Coaches

Pos.	#	Name	Height	Year	Previous school	Hometown
G	0	Hailey Oskey	5 ft 10 in (1.78 m)	RS Sr	Seymour High School	Seymour, WI
G	1	Cassie Schiltz	5 ft 11 in (1.8 m)	RS So	Luxemburg-Casco High School	Luxemburg, WI
G	2	Caelan Givens	5 ft 10 in (1.78 m)	So	Chippewa Falls High School	Chippewa Falls, WI
G	10	Brehna Evans	5 ft 8 in (1.73 m)	GS	St. Cloud State	De Pere, WI
G	11	Natalie McNeal	5 ft 8 in (1.73 m)	So	St. Louis	Germantown, WI
G	12	Callie Genke	6 ft 0 in (1.83 m)	So	Freedom High School	Wrightstown, WI
G	13	Tatum Koenig	5 ft 7 in (1.7 m)	GS	Bradley	West Branch, IA
F	15	Kendall Renard	6 ft 3 in (1.91 m)	So	Green Bay Preble High School	Green Bay, WI
F	21	Jasmine Kondrakiewicz	6 ft 1 in (1.85 m)	So	Pius XI Catholic High School	Milwaukee, WI
G	22	Bailey Butler	5 ft 7 in (1.7 m)	So	Black Hawk High School	South Wayne, WI
G	24	Sydney Levy	5 ft 8 in (1.73 m)	Sr	Milwaukee	Oshkosh, WI
F/C	30	Jenna Guyer	6 ft 2 in (1.88 m)	RS Fr	Centennial High School	Circle Pines, MN
G/F	34	Maddy Schreiber	6 ft 0 in (1.83 m)	So	Kimberly High School	Appleton, WI
F	35	Julia Hartwig	6 ft 2 in (1.88 m)	RS So	Janesville Parker High School	Janesville, WI
F	45	Brooklyn Blackburn	6 ft 0 in (1.83 m)	RS So	Wauwatosa East High School	Milwaukee, WI

Head coach

- Kevin Borseth (Lake Superior State)

Assistant coach(es)

- Megan Vogel (South Dakota State)
- Sarah Bronk (St. Thomas (MN))
- Patrick Bowlin (St. John's)
- Carly Mohns (Iowa/Green Bay)

Legend

- (C) Team captain
- (S) Suspended
- (I) Ineligible
- (W) Walk-on
- Injured
- Current redshirt

Roster
Last update: March 25, 2025

== Schedule and results ==
Date time, TV	Rank^{#}	Opponent^{#}	Result	Record	High points	High rebounds	High assists	Site (attendance) city, state
Exhibition
October 26, 2022*; 7:00 p.m.		Wisconsin–Oshkosh	W 83–51		–	–	–	Kress Events Center; Green Bay, WI
November 2, 2022*; 7:00 p.m.		Michigan Tech	W 68–64	–	–	–	–	Kress Events Center; Green Bay, WI
Regular season
November 7, 2022*; 6:00 p.m., ESPN3		at Drake	L 67–80	0–1	13 – Koenig	5 – Schiltz	5 – Schiltz	Knapp Center (1.814); Des Moines, IA
November 12, 2022*; 1:00 p.m., ESPN+		Marist	W 74–45	1–1	19 – Oskey	6 – Oskey	3 – Butler	Kress Events Center (1,672); Green Bay, WI
November 18, 2022*; 7:00 p.m., ESPN+		at St. Louis	W 73–70	2–1	14 – Schiltz	9 – Oskey	4 – Oskey	Chaifetz Arena (230); Saint Louis, MO
November 24, 2022*; 2:00 p.m., FloHoops		vs. Florida; St. Pete's Showcase	L 52–61	2–2	10 – Genke	6 – Oskey	3 – Oskey	McArthur Center (132); St. Petersburg, FL
November 25, 2022*; 1:00 p.m., FloHoops		vs. Northeastern; St. Pete's Showcase	W 56–46	3–2	14 – Levy	5 – Schiltz	3 – Schiltz	McArthur Center (132); St. Petersburg, FL
December 1, 2022; 7:00 p.m., ESPN+		at Milwaukee	L 52–59	3–3 (0–1)	10 – Schreiber	6 – Oskey	4 – Butler	Klotsche Center (757); Milwaukee, WI
December 3, 2022; 1:00 p.m., ESPN+		at IUPUI	W 87–59	4–3 (1–1)	15 – Levy	7 – Blackburn	5 – Butler	IUPUI Gymnasium (356); Indianapolis, IN
December 10, 2022*; 1:00 p.m., ESPN+		North Dakota State	W 70–52	5–3	18 – Kondrakiewicz	6 – Kondrakiewicz	6 – Butler	Kress Events Center (1,674); Green Bay, WI
December 14,2022*; 7:00 p.m., ESPN+		Wisconsin	W 70–60	6–3	19 – Schreiber	9 – Hartwig	3 – Schiltz	Kress Events Center (2,390); Green Bay, WI
December 18, 2022*; 2:00 p.m., ESPN+		at Illinois State	W 63–49	7–3	12 – Kondrakiewicz	11 – Schiltz	4 – Butler	CEFCU Arena (1,297); Normal, IL
December 21, 2022*; 3:00 p.m., ESPN+		Chicago State	W 92–42	8–3	16 – McNeal	7 – McNeal	6 – Koenig	Kress Events Center (1,254); Green Bay, WI
December 29, 2022; 7:00 p.m., ESPN+		Oakland	W 92–42	9–3 (2–1)	14 – Schreiber	11 – Levy	4 – Genke	Kress Events Center (1,990); Green Bay, WI
December 31, 2022; 1:00 p.m., ESPN+		Detroit Mercy	W 80–33	10–3 (3–1)	14 – Levy	8 – Butler	4 – Koenig	Kress Events Center (1,688); Green Bay, WI
January 5, 2023; 5:00 p.m., ESPN+		at Wright State	W 72–51	11–3 (4–1)	19 – Levy	9 – Levy	6 – Butler	Nutter Center (770); Fairborn, OH
January 7, 2023; 1:00 p.m., ESPN+		at Northern Kentucky	W 70–53	12–3 (5–1)	18 – Schiltz	5 – Schiltz	5 – Schiltz	Truist Arena (940); Highland Heights, KY
January 12, 2023; 6:00 p.m., ESPN+		at Purdue Fort Wayne	W 60–32	13–3 (6–1)	12 – Levy	7 – Genke	3 – Butler	Hilliard Gates Sports Center (446); Fort Wayne, IN
January 14, 2023; 1:00 p.m., ESPN+		at Cleveland State	W 82–65	14–3 (7–1)	16 – McNeal	10 – Hartwig	5 – Schiltz	Wolstein Center (393); Cleveland, OH
January 20, 2023; 7:00 p.m., ESPN+		Youngstown State	L 60–63	14–4 (7–2)	15 – Schiltz	6 – Butler	6 – Butler	Kress Events Center (1,854); Green Bay, WI
January 22, 2023; 1:00 p.m., ESPN+		Robert Morris	W 71–54	15–4 (8–2)	21 – Levy	7 – 2 tied	6 – Hartwig	Kress Events Center (1,735); Green Bay, WI
January 26, 2023; 7:00 p.m., ESPN+		Milwaukee	W 58–40	16–4 (9–2)	15 – Butler	5 – McNeal	6 – Butler	Kress Events Center (1,512); Green Bay, WI
January 30, 2023; 7:00 p.m., ESPN+		IUPUI	W 76–54	17–4 (10–2)	16 – Guyer	7 – Genke	6 – Genke	Kress Events Center (1,512); Green Bay, WI
February 3, 2023; 6:00 p.m., ESPN+		at Detroit Mercy	W 56–47	18–4 (11–2)	17 – Levy	6 – McNeal	3 – Butler	Calihan Hall (176); Detroit, MI
February 5, 2023; 1:00 p.m., ESPN+		at Oakland	W 70–50	19–4 (12–2)	16 – Butler	11 – McNeal	9 – Butler	Athletics Center O'rena (384); Rochester, MI
February 10, 2023; 7:00 p.m., ESPN+		Northern Kentucky	W 54–51	20–4 (13–2)	17 – Butler	9 – Levy	5 – Butler	Kress Events Center (1,776); Green Bay, WI
February 12, 2023; 12:00 p.m., ESPN+		Wright State	W 75–55	21–4 (14–2)	17 – Levy	16 – McNeal	5 – Levy	Kress Events Center (1,815); Green Bay, WI
February 17, 2023; 6:00 p.m., ESPN+		at Robert Morris	W 61–37	22–4 (15–2)	16 – Levy	9 – Schiltz	5 – Butler	UPMC Events Center (431); Moon Township, PA
February 19, 2023; 12:00 p.m., ESPN+		at Youngstown State	W 67–54	23–4 (16–2)	17 – Genke	8 – Schiltz	4 – 2 tied	Beeghly Center (1,644); Youngstown, OH
February 23, 2023; 5:30 p.m., ESPN+		Cleveland State	W 64–49	24–4 (17–2)	16 – McNeal	10 – Kondrakiewicz	5 – Schiltz	Kress Events Center (1,964); Green Bay, WI
February 23, 2023; 1:00 p.m., ESPN3		Purdue Fort Wayne	W 70–64	25–4 (18–2)	20 – Levy	14 – Kondrakiewicz	8 – Butler	Kress Events Center (2,636); Green Bay, WI
Horizon League tournament
March 2, 2023; 7:00 p.m., ESPN+	(1)	(9) Wright State; Quarterfinals	W 85–57	26–4	18 – Kondrakiewicz	10 – McNeal	6 – Schiltz	Kress Events Center (1,823); Green Bay, WI
March 6, 2023; 11:00 a.m., ESPN+	(1)	vs. (6) Purdue Fort Wayne; Semifinals	W 69–65	27–4	17 – Schiltz	9 – McNeal	4 – Levy	Indiana Farmers Coliseum; Indianapolis, IN
March 7, 2024; 11:00 a.m., ESPNU	(1)	vs. (2) Cleveland State; Championship	L 61–73	27–5	18 – McNeal	13 – McNeal	5 – Butler	Indiana Farmers Coliseum; Indianapolis, IN
WNIT
March 16, 2023*; 7:00 p.m., ESPN3		Niagara; First round	W 84–52	28–5	22 – Schiltz	6 – 2 tied	7 – Butler	Kress Center (1,459); Green Bay, WI
March 20, 2023*; 7:00 p.m., ESPN3		Bowling Green; Second round	L 51–69	28–6	11 – Kondrakiewicz	5 – McNeal	3 – Butler	Kress Center (1,761); Green Bay, WI
*Non-conference game. ^{#}Rankings from AP poll. (#) Tournament seedings in parentheses. All times are in Central.
