= Phyllis Holmes =

Basketball coach

Phyllis Holmes was a longtime basketball coach for Greenville College in Greenville, Illinois. She also served as a women's Olympic assistant coach for USA Basketball.

She was inducted into the National Women's Basketball Hall of Fame in 2001 for her years spent as a player, coach, administrator, and official of women's basketball. She was the first woman ever elected President of the National Association for Intercollegiate Athletics (NAIA) basketball association.

== Early career ==
Holmes graduated from Greenville College in 1961. She played basketball there as an undergrad for the Lady Panthers. She holds the single season scoring average record for Greenville with 20 points scored per game in the 1959–60 season.

Before eventually returning to her alma mater to coach, Holmes coached the women's basketball team at Biola University from 1964 to 1967.

At Greenville College, Holmes gained much respect for her coaching ability, eventually coaching for over 25 years before becoming athletic director at GC while also serving as NAIA president. In coaching over 500 games, she won more than 300.

== International basketball ==
Holmes accepted many positions in international women's basketball, beginning with the position of assistant coach at the Olympic Festival in Moscow in 1978, earning a bronze medal.

Holmes served as assistant coach for the women's USA Basketball team prior to the 1980 Olympics. To evaluate prospective players for the 1980 Games, Holmes and head coach Carole Baumgarten of Drake University took part in the 1979 Spartakiade in the Soviet Union. Held every four years since the '50s, Spartakiade was seen as a preview to the Olympic Games each year. That year's team included Ann Meyers and Lynette Woodard.

In international competition, Holmes also served as the manager for the 1981 Women's World University Games held in Bucharest, Romania under head coach Kay Yow of North Carolina State University. The US women earned the silver medal behind the Soviets.

She served as manager for the 1983 US women's team for the world championships in Sao Paulo, Brazil, serving under head coach Pat Summitt of the University of Tennessee. The 9th Women's World Championship was held July 4 to August 6, 1983, in São Paulo. The women's team that year came within one basket of defeating the Soviet Union and retaining their seventh world championship in a row. The team finished 6-2 and brought home a silver medal. The game between the Soviets and Americans was the first time the teams had met head-to-head in international competition since the 1976 Olympics. Among the legendary players on the US team was Cheryl Miller and Lynette Woodard.

In addition to serving as manager for the world championships that year, Holmes went as manager for the USA Women's Pan Am Games, held August 14–27, 1983. The head coach for the Pan Am Games was Fran Garmon of Texas Christian University, and they were held in Caracas, Venezuela. With Garmon at the top and Kay Yow as assistant coach, Holmes remained along with the rest of the players from the World Championships a few weeks earlier. This time, the US came out on top against Cuba.

== NAIA presidency ==
In 1989, in a milestone for women in sports, Holmes was the first woman elected as president of the NAIA. In addition to being the first woman to hold that particular position, her election marked the first time a woman had governed a national body of men's and women's intercollegiate athletics.

In her time as president, Holmes coordinated the first NAIA women's basketball championship and began to plan a national tournament that would expand from eight to 32 competing teams. She also helped to create the Women's Basketball Hall of Fame that would eventually induct her.

Holmes left after one year as NAIA President to serve as the new Hall of Fame's first executive director. In 1991, she became commissioner of the North Star Conference, which folded the following year.

== Honors ==
Holmes was inducted into the Women's Basketball Hall of Fame June 8–9, 2000 for her achievements at GC and on the international basketball stage.

Beginning in 1992, the NAIA annually awards the Phyllis Holmes Coach of the Year Award in NAIA Division II women's basketball.

In 1990, Holmes was inducted into the Greenville College Hall of Fame for coaching. In 1998, her 1979-1980 basketball team was inducted into Greenville's Hall of Fame.
