= List of NCAA Division I conference changes before 2000 =

National Collegiate Athletic Association logo

NCAA Division I conference realignment refers to changes in the alignment of college or university athletic programs from one National Collegiate Athletic Association athletic conference to another.

== 1999–2000 ==
School	Sport(s)	Former Conference	New Conference
Air Force Falcons	Full membership	WAC	Mountain West
Air Force Falcons	Men's ice hockey	Independent	CHA
Alabama–Huntsville Chargers	Men's ice hockey	Independent	CHA
Army Cadets	Men's ice hockey	Independent	CHA
Arkansas State Indians	Football	Division I-A Independent	Big West
Bemidji State Beavers	Men's ice hockey	NCHA (Division II)	CHA
Brigham Young Cougars	Full membership	WAC	Mountain West
Colorado State Rams	Full membership	WAC	Mountain West
Findlay Oilers	Men's ice hockey	MCHA (Division II)	CHA
New Mexico Lobos	Full membership	WAC	Mountain West
New Mexico Lobos	Men's gymnastics, men's swimming & diving, wrestling	WAC	Dropped all three sports
Niagara Purple Eagles	Men's ice hockey	Independent	CHA
San Diego State Aztecs	Full membership	WAC	Mountain West
UAB Blazers	Football	Division I-A Independent	Conference USA
UNLV Rebels	Full membership	WAC	Mountain West
Utah Utes	Full membership	WAC	Mountain West
Wayne State Warriors	Men's ice hockey	(non-hockey)	CHA
Wyoming Cowboys and Cowgirls	Full membership	WAC	Mountain West

== 1998–1999 ==
School	Sport(s)	Former Conference	New Conference
Army Cadets	Football	Division I-A Independent	Conference USA
Boston University Terriers	Football	Atlantic 10	Dropped football
Buffalo Bulls	All	Mid-Continent; Division I-AA Independent	MAC
College of Charleston Cougars	All (non-football)	Big South	SoCon
Evansville Purple Aces	Football	Pioneer	Dropped football
FIU Golden Panthers	All except football	TAAC	Sun Belt
Lamar University Cardinals	All (non-football)	Sun Belt	Southland
Northeastern Illinois Golden Eagles	All	Mid-Continent	Dropped athletics
St. John's Red Storm	Football	MAAC	Division I-AA Independent
UMBC Retrievers	All (non-football)	Big South	NEC
Virginia Tech Hokies	Wrestling	(non-wrestling)	EWL
Western Kentucky Hilltoppers	Football	Division I-AA Independent	Ohio Valley

== 1997–1998 ==
School	Sport(s)	Former Conference	New Conference
Arkansas–Pine Bluff Golden Lions	All	NAIA independent	SWAC
Austin Peay Governors	Football	Ohio Valley	Division I-AA independent
Boston University Terriers	Football	Yankee	Atlantic 10
Connecticut Huskies	Football	Yankee	Atlantic 10
Delaware Fighting Blue Hens	Football	Yankee	Atlantic 10
James Madison Dukes	Football	Yankee	Atlantic 10
Maine Black Bears	Football	Yankee	Atlantic 10
Marist Red Foxes	All (non-football)	NEC	MAAC
Marshall Thundering Herd	All	Southern	MAC
Massachusetts Minutemen	Football	Yankee	Atlantic 10
New Hampshire Wildcats	Baseball	America East	Dropped baseball
New Hampshire Wildcats	Football	Yankee	Atlantic 10
Norfolk State Spartans	All	CIAA (Division II)	MEAC
Northeastern Huskies	Football	Yankee	Atlantic 10
Northern Illinois Huskies	All	Midwestern Collegiate	MAC
Northern Michigan Wildcats	Men's ice hockey	WCHA	CCHA
Oral Roberts Golden Eagles	All sports	Division I independent	Mid-Con
Pittsburgh Panthers	Softball	No team	Big East
Rhode Island Rams	Football	Yankee	Atlantic 10
Richmond Spiders	Football	Yankee	Atlantic 10
Rider Broncs	All (non-football)	NEC	MAAC
South Florida Bulls	Football	No team	Division I-AA independent
Southeastern Louisiana Lions and Lady Lions	All (non-football)	TAAC	Southland
Troy State Trojans	All except football	Mid-Continent	TAAC
UNC Greensboro Spartans	All (non-football)	Big South	SoCon
Villanova Wildcats	Football	Yankee	Atlantic 10
William & Mary Tribe	Football	Yankee	Atlantic 10
Youngstown State Penguins	Football	Division I-AA independent	Gateway

== 1996–1997 ==
School	Sport(s)	Former Conference	New Conference
Air Force Falcons	Women's sports	Colorado Athletic Conference (D-II)	WAC
Arkansas State Indians	Football	Big West	Division I-A Independent
Baylor Bears	All	Southwest	Big 12
Boise State Broncos	All	Big Sky	Big West
Cal Poly SLO Mustangs	All except football	American West	Big West
Cal State Northridge Matadors	All	American West	Big Sky
Colorado Buffaloes	All except skiing	Big Eight	Big 12
Eastern Illinois Panthers	All except football Football	Mid-Continent; Gateway	OVC
Fairfield Stags	Football	Independent?	MAAC
Hawaiʻi Rainbow Wahine	Women's sports	Big West	WAC
Houston Cougars	All	Southwest	Conference USA
Idaho Vandals	All	Big Sky	Big West
Iowa State Cyclones	All	Big Eight	Big 12
Kansas Jayhawks	All	Big Eight	Big 12
Kansas State Wildcats	All	Big Eight	Big 12
Kentucky Wildcats	Softball	Club team	SEC
Louisiana Tech Bulldogs	Football	Big West	Division I-A Independent
Mankato State Mavericks	Men's ice hockey	Division II Independent	Independent
Missouri Tigers	All	Big Eight	Big 12
Nebraska Cornhuskers	All	Big Eight	Big 12
Niagara Purple Eagles	Men's ice hockey	Club team	Independent
Northern Illinois Huskies	Football	Big West	Division I-A Independent
North Texas Mean Green	All	Division I-A Independent	Big West
Oklahoma Sooners	All	Big Eight	Big 12
Oklahoma State Cowboys	All	Big Eight	Big 12
Pacific Tigers	Football	Big West	Dropped football
Portland State Vikings	All	Division II Independent	Big Sky
Rice Owls	All	Southwest	WAC
Sacramento State Hornets	All	American West	Big Sky
San Jose State Spartans	All	Big West	WAC
SMU Mustangs	All	Southwest	WAC
Southwestern Louisiana Ragin' Cajuns	Football	Big West	Division I-A Independent
TCU Horned Frogs	All	Southwest	WAC
Texas Longhorns	All	Southwest	Big 12
Texas A&M Aggies	All	Southwest	Big 12
Texas Tech Red Raiders	All	Southwest	Big 12
Tulsa Golden Hurricane	All; Football	MVC; Division I-A Independent	WAC
UCF Golden Knights	Football	Division I-AA Independent	Division I-A Independent
UIC Flames	Men's ice hockey	CCHA	Dropped hockey
UNLV Rebels	All	Big West	WAC

== 1995–1996 ==
School	Sport(s)	Former Conference	New Conference
Cincinnati Bearcats	All	Metro Conference; Division I-A Independent	Conference USA
DePaul Blue Demons	All (non-football)	Great Midwest	Conference USA
Dayton Flyers	All except football	Great Midwest	Atlantic 10
Fordham Rams	All except football	Patriot	Atlantic 10
Kentucky Wildcats	Men's soccer	Division I independent	MAC
La Salle Explorers	All except football	Midwestern Collegiate	Atlantic 10
Louisville Cardinals	All except field hockey	Metro Conference; Division I-A Independent	Conference USA
Marquette Golden Eagles	All (non-football)	Great Midwest	Conference USA
Memphis Tigers	All	Great Midwest; Division I-A Independent	Conference USA
North Texas Mean Green	All	Southland	Division I-A Independent
Rutgers Scarlet Knights	All except football	Atlantic 10	Big East
Saint Louis Billikens	All (non-football)	Great Midwest	Conference USA
South Carolina Gamecocks	Men's soccer	Metro Conference	Division I independent
South Florida Bulls	All (non-football)	Metro Conference	Conference USA
Southern Mississippi Golden Eagles	All	Metro Conference; Division I-A Independent	Conference USA
Towson State Tigers	All except football	Big South	North Atlantic
Tulane Green Wave	All	Metro Conference; Division I-A Independent	Conference USA
UAB Blazers	All	Great Midwest; Division I-AA Independent	Conference USA; Division I-A Independent
UNC Charlotte 49ers	All (non-football)	Metro Conference	Conference USA
Virginia Commonwealth Rams	All (non-football)	Metro Conference	CAA
Virginia Tech Hokies	All except football & wrestling	Metro Conference	Atlantic 10
West Virginia Mountaineers	All except football	Atlantic 10	Big East
Xavier Musketeers	All (non-football)	Midwestern Collegiate	Atlantic 10

== 1994–1995 ==
School	Sport(s)	Former Conference	New Conference
Buffalo Bulls	All except football	East Coast	Mid-Continent
Chicago State Cougars	All (non-football)	East Coast	Mid-Continent
Central Connecticut State Blue Devils	All	East Coast (non-football) ? (football)	Mid-Continent
Cleveland State Vikings	All except wrestling	Mid-Continent	Midwestern Collegiate
Evansville Purple Aces	All except football	Midwestern Collegiate	MVC
Hofstra Flying Dutchmen	All except football	East Coast	America East
Kent State Golden Flashes	Men's ice hockey	CCHA	Dropped hockey
Louisville Cardinals	Field hockey	Division I independent	MAC
Northeast Louisiana Indians	Football	Southland	Division I-A Independent
Northeastern Illinois Golden Eagles	All	East Coast	Mid-Continent
Northern Illinois Huskies	All except football	Mid-Continent	Midwestern Collegiate
Troy State Trojans	All except football	East Coast	Mid-Continent
UC Davis Aggies	All	American West	CCAA (D-II)
UIC Flames	All	Mid-Continent	Midwestern Collegiate
UMass Minutemen	Men's ice hockey	Division I independent	Hockey East
UMKC Kangaroos	All	Independent (most sports); NAIA independent (women's basketball)	Mid-Continent
Wisconsin-Green Bay Phoenix	All	Mid-Continent	Midwestern Collegiate
Wisconsin-Milwaukee Panthers	All	Mid-Continent	Midwestern Collegiate
Wright State Raiders	All	Mid-Continent	Midwestern Collegiate

== 1993–1994 ==
School	Sport(s)	Former Conference	New Conference
Arkansas State Indians	Football	Division I-A Independent	Big West
Buffalo Bulls	Football	Division III Independent	Division I-AA Independent
Butler Bulldogs	Football	MIFC (D-II)	Pioneer
Cal State Fullerton Titans	Football	Division I-A Independent	Dropped football
Dayton Flyers	All others Football	Midwestern Collegiate; Division I-AA Independent	Great Midwest; Pioneer
Drake Bulldogs	Football	Division III Independent	Pioneer
Evansville Purple Aces	Football	??	Pioneer
Florida Atlantic Owls	All	NCAA Division II	Atlantic Sun
Iona Gaels	Football	LFC (D-III)	MAAC
Northeastern Illinois Golden Eagles	All	??	East Coast
Northern Illinois Huskies	Football	Division I-A Independent	Big West
Penn State Nittany Lions	All	Division I-A Independent; EWL	Big Ten
St. John's Redmen	Football	LFC (D-III)	MAAC
Saint Mary's Gaels	Football	Division II Independent	Division I-AA Independent
South Carolina Gamecocks	Men's soccer	Division I independent	Metro Conference
San Diego Toreros	Football	Division III Independent	Pioneer
UAB Blazers	Football	Division III Independent	Division I-AA Independent
UMass Minutemen	Men's ice hockey	ACHA (club hockey)	Division I independent
Valparaiso Crusaders	Football	MIFC (D-II)	Pioneer

== 1992–1993 ==
School	Sport(s)	Former Conference	New Conference
Akron Zips	All	Mid-Continent (men's sports); Division I-A Independent; North Star (women's sports)	MAC
Arkansas Razorbacks	Football	SWC	SEC
Bradley Braves	Women's sports	Gateway	MVC
Cal State Fullerton Titans	Football	Big West	Division I-A Independent
Cleveland State Vikings	Women's sports	North Star	Mid-Continent
Creighton Bluejays	Women's sports	Gateway	MVC
Drake Bulldogs	Women's sports	Gateway	MVC
Eastern Illinois Panthers	Women's sports	Gateway	Mid-Continent
Florida State Seminoles	Football	Division I-A Independent	ACC
Fresno State Bulldogs	All	Big West	WAC
Illinois State Redbirds	Women's sports	Gateway	MVC
Indiana State Sycamores	Women's sports	Gateway	MVC
La Salle Explorers	All except football	MAAC	Midwestern Collegiate
Long Beach State 49ers	Football	Division I-A Independent	Dropped football
Nevada Wolf Pack	All	Big Sky	Big West
Northern Illinois Huskies	Women's sports	North Star	Mid-Continent
Northern Iowa Panthers	Women's sports	Gateway	MVC
Notre Dame Fighting Irish	Men's ice hockey	Independent	CCHA
Rider Broncs	All (non-football)	East Coast	NEC
South Carolina Gamecocks	Football	Division I-A Independent	SEC
Southern Illinois Salukis	Women's sports	Gateway	MVC
Southwest Missouri State Lady Bears	Women's sports	Gateway	MVC
Towson State Tigers	All except football	East Coast	Big South
Tulsa Golden Hurricane	Women's sports	Gateway	MVC
UCF Knights of the Pegasus	All except football	Sun Belt	TAAC
UIC Flames	Women's sports	North Star	Mid-Continent
UMBC Retrievers	All (non-football)	East Coast	Big South
Valparaiso Crusaders	Women's sports	North Star	Mid-Continent
Western Illinois Westerwinds	Women's sports	Gateway	Mid-Continent
Wichita State Shockers	Women's sports	Gateway	MVC
Wisconsin–Green Bay Phoenix	Women's sports	North Star	Mid-Continent
Wright State Raiders	Women's sports	North Star	Mid-Continent

== 1991–1992 ==
School	Sport(s)	Former Conference	New Conference
Arkansas Razorbacks	All except football	SWC	SEC
Arkansas State Indians	All except football	American South	Sun Belt
Boston College Eagles	Football	Division I-A Independent	Big East
Cincinnati Bearcats	All except football	Metro Conference	Great Midwest
Delaware Fightin' Blue Hens	All except football	East Coast	North Atlantic
DePaul Blue Demons	All (non-football)	Division I independent (men's sports); North Star (women's sports)	Great Midwest
Drexel Dragons	All (non-football)	East Coast	North Atlantic
Florida State Seminoles	All except football	Metro Conference	ACC
Long Beach State 49ers	Football	Big West	Division I-A Independent
Lamar Cardinals	All (non-football)	American South	Sun Belt
Louisiana Tech Bulldogs and Lady Techsters	All except football	American South	Sun Belt
Marquette Warriors	All (non-football)	Midwestern Collegiate	Great Midwest
Memphis State Tigers	All except football	Metro Conference	Great Midwest
Miami Hurricanes	All	Division I-A Independent	Big East
Navy Midshipmen	All except football	CAA	Patriot League
New Mexico Lobos	Women's basketball	No team	WAC
New Orleans Privateers	All (non-football)	American South	Sun Belt
Northern Iowa Panthers	All men's sports except football	Mid-Continent	MVC
Northern Iowa Panthers	Women's sports	Mid-Continent	Gateway
Notre Dame Fighting Irish	Men's ice hockey	Independent	CCHA
Oral Roberts Titans	All sports	NAIA independent	Division I independent
Pittsburgh Panthers	Football	Division I-A Independent	Big East
Rutgers Scarlet Knights	Football	Division I-A Independent	Big East
Saint Louis Billikens	All (non-football)	Midwestern Collegiate	Great Midwest
South Carolina Gamecocks	All except football	Metro Conference	SEC
South Florida Bulls	All (non-football)	Sun Belt	Metro Conference
Southwestern Louisiana Ragin' Cajuns	All except football	American South	Sun Belt
Syracuse Orangemen	Football	Division I-A Independent	Big East
Temple Owls	Football	Division I-A Independent	Big East
Texas–Pan American Broncs	All (non-football)	American South	Sun Belt
UAB Blazers	All except football	Sun Belt	Great Midwest
UCF Knights of the Pegasus	All except football	American South	Sun Belt
UNC Charlotte 49ers	All (non-football)	Sun Belt	Metro Conference
Virginia Commonwealth Rams	All (non-football)	Sun Belt	Metro Conference
Virginia Tech Hokies	Football	Division I-A Independent	Big East
West Virginia Mountaineers	Football	Division I-A Independent	Big East
Wisconsin Badgers	Baseball	Big Ten	Dropped baseball

== 1990–1991 ==
School	Sport(s)	Former Conference	New Conference
Akron Zips	All men's sports except football	Division I independent	Mid-Continent
Army Cadets	All except football and ice hockey	MAAC	Patriot League
Bucknell Bison	All sports	East Coast	Patriot League
Southwest Missouri State Bears	All men's sports except football	Mid-Continent	MVC
Northern Illinois Huskies	All men's sports except football	Division I independent	Mid-Continent
UCF Knights of the Pegasus	Football	Division II Independent	Division I-AA Independent
Utah State Aggies	Women's sports	High Country	Big West

== 1989–1990 ==
School	Sport(s)	Former Conference	New Conference
Edinboro Fighting Scots	Wrestling	???	EWL
Loyola (MD) Greyhounds	All (non-football)	NEC	MAAC
Merrimack Warriors	Men's ice hockey	Independent	Hockey East
Oral Roberts Titans	All sports	Division I independent	NAIA independent
Siena Saints	All (non-football)	North Atlantic	MAAC
Tulane Green Wave	Men's basketball	No team	Metro

== 1988–1989 ==
School	Sport(s)	Former Conference	New Conference
Akron Zips	Women's sports	Independent	North Star
Boise State Broncos	Women's sports	Mountain West Athletic Conference	Big Sky
Dayton Flyers	All except football	Independent (men's sports); North Star (women's sports)	Midwestern Collegiate
Eastern Washington Eagles	Women's sports	Mountain West Athletic Conference	Big Sky
Idaho Vandals	Women's sports	Mountain West Athletic Conference	Big Sky
Idaho State Bengals	Women's sports	Mountain West Athletic Conference	Big Sky
Montana Lady Griz	Women's sports	Mountain West Athletic Conference	Big Sky
Montana State Bobcats	Women's sports	Mountain West Athletic Conference	Big Sky
Nevada Wolf Pack	Women's sports	Mountain West Athletic Conference	Big Sky
Northern Arizona Lumberjacks	Women's sports	Mountain West Athletic Conference	Big Sky
Notre Dame Fighting Irish	Women's sports	North Star	Midwestern Collegiate
Villanova Wildcats	Football	Division I-AA independent	Yankee
Weber State Wildcats	Women's sports	Mountain West Athletic Conference	Big Sky

== 1987–1988 ==
School	Sport(s)	Former Conference	New Conference
Akron Zips	All sports	Ohio Valley	Division I-A independent Division I independent (sports other than football)
Drake Bulldogs	Football	Dropped (exhibition only)	Division III Independent
Eastern Washington Eagles	Football	Division I-AA Independent	Big Sky
Gonzaga Bulldogs	Women's sports	Division I independent	WCAC
Nevada Wolf Pack	Women's sports	WCAC	Mountain West Athletic Conference
New Mexico Lobos	Women's basketball	High Country	Dropped women's basketball
Northern Illinois Huskies	All sports	MAC (men's sports) ? (women's sports)	Division I independent (men's sports); North Star (women's sports)
Northwestern State Demons	All sports	Gulf Star	Southland
Oral Roberts Titans	All sports	Midwestern Collegiate	Division I independent
Notre Dame Fighting Irish	Men's sports except football	Division I independent	Midwestern Collegiate
Sam Houston State Bearkats	All sports	Gulf Star	Southland
Stephen F. Austin Lumberjacks	All sports	Gulf Star	Southland
Southwest Texas State Bobcats	All sports	Gulf Star	Southland
UMKC Kangaroos	Men's basketball	No team	Division I independent
Utah State Aggies	Women's basketball	High Country	Dropped women's basketball
Villanova Wildcats	Football	Division III independent	Division I-AA independent
Wichita State Shockers	Football	Division I-A Independent	Dropped football

== 1986–1987 ==
School	Sport(s)	Former Conference	New Conference
Arizona Wildcats	Women's sports	PacWest	Pac-10
Arizona State Sun Devils	Women's sports	PacWest	Pac-10
California Golden Bears	Women's sports	Northern Pacific	Pac-10
Central Connecticut State Blue Devils	All except football	Division II Independent	Division I Independent
Detroit Titans	Women's sports	North Star	Midwestern Collegiate
Drake Bulldogs	Football	MVC	Dropped football (exhibition only)
Evansville Lady Aces	Women's sports	North Star	Midwestern Collegiate
Gonzaga Bulldogs	Women's sports	?? (NAIA)	Division I independent
Illinois State Redbirds	Football	MVC	Gateway (already a member for one year)
Indiana State Sycamores	Football	Division I-AA Independent	Gateway
Loyola Chicago Ramblers	Women's sports	North Star	Midwestern Collegiate
Northern Illinois Huskies	Football?	MAC	Division I-A Independent
Notre Dame Fighting Irish	Men's sports except football	Midwestern Collegiate	Division I independent
Oregon Ducks	Women's sports	Northern Pacific	Pac-10
Oregon State Beavers	Women's sports	Northern Pacific	Pac-10
Southern Illinois Salukis	Football	MVC	Gateway (already a member for one year)
Stanford Cardinal	Women's sports	PacWest	Pac-10
Tulsa Golden Hurricane	Football	MVC	Division I-A Independent
UCLA Bruins	Women's sports	PacWest	Pac-10
UMKC Kangaroos	All except basketball	NAIA independent	Division I independent
USC Trojans	Women's sports	PacWest	Pac-10
Washington Huskies	Women's sports	Northern Pacific	Pac-10
Washington State Cougars	Women's sports	Northern Pacific	Pac-10
West Texas State Buffaloes	All	MVC	Lone Star (D-II)
Wichita State Shockers	Football	MVC	Division I-A Independent
Xavier Musketeers	Women's sports	North Star	Midwestern Collegiate

== 1985–1986 ==
School	Sport(s)	Former Conference	New Conference
Cal State Fullerton Titans	Women's sports	WCAA	PCAA
Coppin State Eagles	All		MEAC
Eastern Illinois Panthers	Football	Mid-Continent	Gateway
Illinois State Redbirds	Football	MVC (Held dual membership for one year)	Gateway
Hartford Hawks	All		ECAC North Atlantic
Long Beach State 49ers	Women's sports	WCAA	PCAA
LSU Tigers	Wrestling	SEC	Dropped wrestling
Miami (FL) Hurricanes	Men's basketball	No team	Independent
Nevada Wolf Pack	Women's sports	???	WCAC
Northern Iowa Panthers	Football	Mid-Continent	Gateway
Southwest Missouri State Bears	Football	Mid-Continent	Gateway
Oklahoma City Chiefs	All	Midwestern Collegiate	Sooner Athletic Conference (NAIA)
San Diego State Aztecs	Women's sports	WCAA	PCAA
San Francisco Dons	Men's basketball	No team	WCAC
San Francisco Dons	Women's sports	Northern Pacific	WCAC
Santa Clara Broncos	Women's sports	Northern Pacific	WCAC
Southern Illinois Salukis	Football	MVC (Held dual membership for one year)	Gateway
Tulane Green Wave	Men's basketball	Metro	Dropped men's basketball
Western Illinois Leathernecks	Football	Mid-Continent	Gateway

== 1980–1984 ==
Year	School	Sport(s)	Former Conference	New Conference
1983–1984	Georgia Tech Yellow Jackets	Football	Independent	ACC
1982–1983	Cleveland State Vikings	All	Independent	Association of Mid-Continent Universities
1982–1983	Pittsburgh Panthers	All sports except football	Eastern 8	Big East
1982–1983	San Francisco Dons	Men's basketball	WCAC	Dropped men's basketball
1982–1983	West Virginia Mountaineers	Men's golf	Eastern 8	Dropped men's golf
1981–1982	Auburn Tigers	Wrestling	SEC	Dropped wrestling
1981–1982	Oregon Ducks	Baseball	Pac-10	Dropped baseball
1980–1981	Air Force Falcons	Full membership (men only)	Independent	WAC
1980–1981	Idaho Vandals	Baseball	Big Sky	Dropped baseball
1980–1981	Seattle Chieftains	Full membership	WCAC	NAIA
1980–1981	Vanderbilt Commodores	Women's volleyball	SEC	Dropped women's volleyball
1980–1981	Villanova Wildcats	Full membership (non-football)	Eastern 8	Big East

== 1970s ==
Year	School	Sport(s)	Former Conference	New Conference
1979–1980	Boston College Eagles	All sports except football	Independent	Big East
1979–1980	Connecticut Huskies	All sports except football	Independent	Big East
1979–1980	Georgetown Hoyas	All sports except football	Independent	Big East
1979–1980	Georgia Tech Yellow Jackets	All sports except football	Metro	ACC
1979–1980	Gonzaga Bulldogs	All men's sports	Big Sky	WCAC
1979–1980	Hawaii Rainbows	All men's sports	Independent	WAC
1979–1980	Nevada Wolf Pack	All men's sports except football	WCAC	Big Sky
1979–1980	Penn State Nittany Lions	All sports except football	Eastern 8	Independent
1979–1980	Providence Friars	All sports (non-football)	Independent	Big East
1979–1980	St. Bonaventure Bonnies	All sports (non-football)	Independent	Eastern 8
1979–1980	St. John's Redmen	All sports except football	Independent	Big East
1979–1980	Seton Hall Pirates	All sports except football	Independent	Big East
1979–1980	Syracuse Orangemen and Orangewomen	All sports except football	Independent	Big East
1978–1979	Arizona Wildcats	All men's sports	WAC	Pac-10
1978–1979	Arizona State Sun Devils	All men's sports	WAC	Pac-10
1978–1979	San Diego State Aztecs	All men's sports except baseball	PCAA	WAC
1978–1979	San Diego State Aztecs	Baseball	SCBA	WAC
1976–1977	Houston Cougars	Football	Independent	SWC
1975–1976	Cincinnati Bearcats	All sports except football	Independent	Metro
1975–1976	Georgia Tech Yellow Jackets	All sports except football	Independent	Metro
1975–1976	Houston Cougars	Men's basketball	Independent	SWC
1975–1976	Louisville Cardinals	All sports except football	MVC	Metro
1975–1976	Memphis State Tigers	All sports except football	Independent	Metro
1975–1976	Saint Louis Billikens	All sports (non-football)	Independent	Metro
1975–1976	Tulane Green Wave	All sports except football	Independent	Metro
1974–1975	Cal State Los Angeles Golden Eagles	All sports except baseball	PCAA	CCAA (D-II)
1974–1975	Saint Louis Billikens	All sports (non-football)	MVC	Independent
1972–1973	Houston Cougars	Men's sports except football and basketball	Independent	SWC
1972–1973	Syracuse Orangemen	Baseball	Independent	Dropped baseball
1971–1972	Drake Bulldogs	Football	Independent	MVC
1971–1972	Miami (FL) Hurricanes	Men's basketball	Independent	Dropped men's basketball
1971–1972	Pacific Tigers	All except football	WCAC	PCAA
1971–1972	Seattle Chieftains	All	Independent	WCAC

== 1960s ==
Year	School	Sport(s)	Former Conference	New Conference
1969–1970	Cal State Los Angeles Golden Eagles	All sports	CCAA	PCAA
1969–1970	Fresno State Bulldogs	All sports	CCAA	PCAA
1969–1970	Long Beach State 49ers	All sports	CCAA	PCAA
1969–1970	Pacific Tigers	Football	Independent	PCAA
1969–1970	San Diego State Aztecs	All sports	CCAA	PCAA
1969–1970	San Jose State Spartans	All sports	WCAC	PCAA
1969–1970	UC Santa Barbara Gauchos	All sports	WCAC	PCAA
1968–1969	Colorado State Rams	Football	Independent	WAC
1968–1969	UTEP Miners	Football	Independent	WAC
1967–1968	Colorado State Rams	All except football	Independent	WAC
1967–1968	UTEP Miners	All except football	Independent	WAC
1966–1967	South Carolina Gamecocks	All	ACC	Independent
1966–1967	Tulane Green Wave	All	SEC	Independent
1964–1965	Georgia Tech Yellow Jackets	All	SEC	Independent
1964–1965	Oregon Ducks	All	Independent	AAWU
1964–1965	Oregon State Beavers	All	Independent	AAWU
1963–1964	Gonzaga Bulldogs	All (non-football)	Independent	Big Sky
1963–1964	Hardin–Simmons Cowboys	All	Independent (University Division)	Independent (College Division)
1963–1964	Idaho Vandals	All	Independent	Big Sky
1963–1964	Idaho State Bengals	All	Independent	Big Sky
1963–1964	Montana Grizzlies	All	Independent	Big Sky
1963–1964	Montana State Bobcats	All	Independent	Big Sky
1963–1964	Weber State Wildcats	All	Independent	Big Sky
1962–1963	Arizona Wildcats	All	Border	WAC
1962–1963	Arizona State–Tempe Sun Devils	All	Border	WAC
1962–1963	BYU Cougars	All	Skyline Eight	WAC
1962–1963	Colorado State Rams	All	Skyline Eight	Independent
1962–1963	Hardin–Simmons Cowboys	All	Border	Independent
1962–1963	Denver Pioneers	All except ice hockey (non-football)	Skyline Eight	Independent
1962–1963	Montana Grizzlies	All	Skyline Eight	Independent
1962–1963	New Mexico Lobos	All	Skyline Eight	WAC
1962–1963	New Mexico State Aggies	All	Border	Independent
1962–1963	Utah Utes	All	Skyline Eight	WAC
1962–1963	Utah State Aggies	All	Skyline Eight	Independent
1962–1963	Washington State Cougars	All	Independent	AAWU
1962–1963	West Texas State Buffaloes	All	Border	Independent
1962–1963	Wyoming Cowboys	All	Skyline Eight	WAC

== 1950s ==
Year	School	Sport(s)	Former Conference	New Conference
1959–1960	California Golden Bears	All	PCC	AAWU
1959–1960	Idaho Vandals	All	PCC	Independent
1959–1960	Oregon Ducks	All	PCC	Independent
1959–1960	Oregon State Beavers	All	PCC	Independent
1959–1960	Stanford Indians	All	PCC	AAWU
1959–1960	UCLA Bruins	All	PCC	AAWU
1959–1960	USC Trojans	All	PCC	AAWU
1959–1960	Washington Huskies	All	PCC	AAWU
1959–1960	Washington State Cougars	All	PCC	Independent
1953–1954	Clemson Tigers	All	SoCon	ACC
1953–1954	Duke Blue Devils	All	SoCon	ACC
1953–1954	Maryland Terrapins	All	SoCon	ACC
1953–1954	North Carolina Tar Heels	All	SoCon	ACC
1953–1954	North Carolina State Wolfpack	All	SoCon	ACC
1953–1954	South Carolina Gamecocks	All	SoCon	ACC
1953–1954	Wake Forest Demon Deacons	All	SoCon	ACC
1953–1954	Virginia Cavaliers	All	Independent	ACC

== 1928–1950 ==
Year	School	Sport(s)	Former Conference	New Conference
1948–1949	Colorado Buffaloes	All	Skyline Conference	MVIAA
1945–1946	Chicago Maroons	All	Big Ten	Dropped athletics
1938–1939	BYU Cougars	All	Rocky Mountain Faculty Athletic Conference	Skyline Conference
1938–1939	Colorado Buffaloes	All	Rocky Mountain Faculty Athletic Conference	Skyline Conference
1938–1939	Colorado State Rams	All	Rocky Mountain Faculty Athletic Conference	Skyline Conference
1938–1939	Denver Pioneers	All	Rocky Mountain Faculty Athletic Conference	Skyline Conference
1938–1939	Utah Utes	All	Rocky Mountain Faculty Athletic Conference	Skyline Conference
1938–1939	Utah State Aggies	All	Rocky Mountain Faculty Athletic Conference	Skyline Conference
1938–1939	Wyoming Cowboys	All	Rocky Mountain Faculty Athletic Conference	Skyline Conference
1932–1933	Alabama Crimson Tide	All	SoCon	SEC
1932–1933	Auburn Tigers	All	SoCon	SEC
1932–1933	Florida Gators	All	SoCon	SEC
1932–1933	Georgia Bulldogs	All	SoCon	SEC
1932–1933	Kentucky Wildcats	All	SoCon	SEC
1932–1933	LSU Fighting Tigers	All	SoCon	SEC
1932–1933	Mississippi Rebels	All	SoCon	SEC
1932–1933	Mississippi State Bulldogs	All	SoCon	SEC
1932–1933	Tennessee Volunteers	All	SoCon	SEC
1932–1933	Vanderbilt Commodores	All	SoCon	SEC
1932–1933	Sewanee Tigers	All	SoCon	SEC
1932–1933	Georgia Tech Yellow Jackets	All	SoCon	SEC
1932–1933	Tulane Green Wave	All	SoCon	SEC
1928–1929	Iowa State Cyclones	All	Missouri Valley	MVIAA
1928–1929	Kansas Jayhawks	All	Missouri Valley	MVIAA
1928–1929	Kansas State Wildcats	All	Missouri Valley	MVIAA
1928–1929	Missouri Tigers	All	Missouri Valley	MVIAA
1928–1929	Nebraska Cornhuskers	All	Missouri Valley	MVIAA
1928–1929	Oklahoma Sooners	All	Missouri Valley	MVIAA

== See also ==
- 1996 NCAA conference realignment
- 2005 NCAA conference realignment
- 2010–2014 NCAA conference realignment
