= 2023 Horizon League women's basketball tournament =

- Classification: Division I
- Season: 2022–23
- Teams: 11
- Site: Campus sites (First Round and Quarterfinals); Indiana Farmers Coliseum; Indianapolis, Indiana (Semifinals and Finals)
- Champions: Cleveland State (3rd title)
- MVP: Destiny Leo (Cleveland State)
- Television: ESPN+, ESPNU

The 2023 Horizon League Women's Basketball Tournament was the final event of the 2022–23 women's basketball season for the Horizon League. It began on February 28, 2023, and ended on March 7; first-round and quarterfinal games were played at the home courts of the higher seeds, with all remaining games at Indiana Farmers Coliseum in Indianapolis. As the tournament winner, Cleveland State received the conference's automatic berth into the NCAA Tournament.

2022–23 Horizon League women's basketball standings
| | Conf. | | | | Overall |
| Team | W | | L | PCT | W | | L | PCT |
|---|---|---|---|---|---|---|---|---|
| Green Bay | 18 | – | 2 | .900 | 28 | – | 5 | .848 |
| Cleveland State† | 17 | – | 3 | .850 | 30 | – | 4 | .882 |
| IUPUI | 13 | – | 7 | .650 | 17 | – | 13 | .567 |
| Youngstown State | 13 | – | 7 | .650 | 19 | – | 11 | .633 |
| Northern Kentucky | 10 | – | 10 | .500 | 17 | – | 14 | .548 |
| Purdue Fort Wayne | 9 | – | 11 | .450 | 14 | – | 19 | .424 |
| Oakland | 8 | – | 12 | .400 | 13 | – | 17 | .433 |
| Milwaukee | 8 | – | 12 | .400 | 11 | – | 19 | .367 |
| Wright State | 6 | – | 14 | .300 | 8 | – | 24 | .250 |
| Robert Morris | 5 | – | 15 | .250 | 11 | – | 19 | .367 |
| Detroit Mercy | 3 | – | 17 | .150 | 5 | – | 25 | .167 |
† 2023 Horizon League Tournament winner As of March 17, 2023

== Seeds ==
All of the teams will participate in the tournament with the top-five teams receiving byes to the quarterfinals.

| Seed | School | Conf | Tiebreaker |
|---|---|---|---|
| 1 | Green Bay | 18−2 | |
| 2 | Cleveland State | 17−3 | |
| 3 | IUPUI | 13−7 | 2-0 vs. Youngstown State |
| 4 | Youngstown State | 13−7 | 0-2 vs. IUPUI |
| 5 | Northern Kentucky | 10−10 | |
| 6 | Purdue Fort Wayne | 9−11 | |
| 7 | Milwaukee | 8−12 | 1-1 vs. Oakland; 1-1 vs. Green Bay |
| 8 | Oakland | 8−12 | 1-1 vs. Milwaukee; 0-2 vs. Green Bay |
| 9 | Wright State | 6−14 | |
| 10 | Robert Morris | 5−15 | |
| 11 | Detroit Mercy | 3−17 | |

== Schedule ==
| Game | Time | Matchup | Score | Television |
First Round – Tuesday, February 28
| 1 | 7:00 pm | No. 11 Detroit Mercy at No. 6 Purdue Fort Wayne | 61-65 | ESPN+ |
| 2 | 7:00 pm | No. 9 Wright State at No. 8 Oakland | 79-69 | ESPN+ |
| 3 | 7:00 pm | No. 10 Robert Morris at No. 7 Milwaukee | 58-64 | ESPN+ |
Quarterfinals – Thursday, March 2
| 4 | 5:30 pm | No. 7 Milwaukee at No. 2 Cleveland State | 52-65 | ESPN+ |
| 5 | 5:30 pm | No. 5 Northern Kentucky at No. 4 Youngstown State | 59-58 | ESPN+ |
| 6 | 7:00 pm | No. 6 Purdue Fort Wayne at No. 3 IUPUI | 73-69 | ESPN+ |
| 7 | 8:00 pm | No. 9 Wright State at No. 1 Green Bay | 57-85 | ESPN+ |
Semifinals – Monday, March 6 at Indiana Farmers Coliseum, Indianapolis, IN
| 8 | 12:00 pm | No. 1 Green Bay vs. No. 6 Purdue Fort Wayne | 69-65 | ESPN+ |
| 9 | 2:30 pm | No. 2 Cleveland State vs. No. 5 Northern Kentucky | 63–60 ^{OT} | ESPN+ |
Championship – Tuesday, March 7 at Indiana Farmers Coliseum, Indianapolis, IN
| 10 | 12:00 pm | No. 1 Green Bay vs. No. 2 Cleveland State | 61–73 | ESPNU |
All game times are Eastern. Rankings denote tournament seed

== Bracket ==
First round Tuesday, February 28
8 | Oakland | 69
9 | Wright State | 79
7 | Milwaukee | 63
10 | Robert Morris | 58
6 | Purdue Fort Wayne | 65
11 | Detroit Mercy | 61

Quarterfinals; Thursday, March 2
1 | Green Bay | 85
9 | Wright State | 57
4 | Youngstown State | 58
5 | Northern Kentucky | 59
2 | Cleveland State | 65
7 | Milwaukee | 52
3 | IUPUI | 59
6 | Purdue Fort Wayne | 73

Semifinals; Monday, March 6
1 | Green Bay | 69
6 | Purdue Fort Wayne | 65
2 | Cleveland State | 63*
5 | Northern Kentucky | 60

Championship; Tuesday, March 7
1 | Green Bay | 61
2 | Cleveland State | 73

* denotes overtime period
