= 1989 North Star Conference women's basketball tournament =

- Classification: Division I
- Teams: 8
- North Star Conference women's basketball tournaments

The 1989 North Star Conference Women's Basketball Tournament was held in Chicago, Illinois. The tournament began on March 9, 1989, and ended on March 11, 1989.

== North Star Conference standings ==
| # | Team | Conference | Pct. | Overall | Pct. |
|---|---|---|---|---|---|
| 1 | Northern Illinois | 12–2 | .833 | 23–7 | .767 |
| 2 | DePaul | 12–2 | .833 | 23–10 | .697 |
| 3 | Green Bay | 11–3 | .786 | 19–10 | .665 |
| 4 | Marquette | 7–7 | .500 | 13–15 | .464 |
| 5 | Akron | 6–8 | .429 | 14–15 | .483 |
| 6 | Illinois Chicago | 3–11 | .214 | 5–23 | .179 |
| 7 | Valparaiso | 3–11 | .214 | 6–22 | .214 |
| 8 | Cleveland State | 2–12 | .143 | 3–25 | .107 |

== 1989 North Star Conference Tournament ==
- First Round March 9, 1989 Northern Illinois 96, Cleveland State 64
- First Round March 9, 1989 Green Bay 67, Illinois Chicago 53
- First Round March 9, 1989 Akron 73, Marquette 60
- First Round March 9, 1989 DePaul 90, Valparaiso 54
- Semifinals March 10, 1989 Northern Illinois 71, Akron 64
- Semifinals March 10, 1989 DePaul 73, Green Bay 64
- Championship March 11, 1989 DePaul 76, Northern Illinois 61
