= 2022 Women's Basketball Invitational =

American basketball tournament

- Season: 2021–22
- Teams: 8
- Finals site: Clive M. Beck Center; Lexington, Kentucky
- Champions: Saint Mary's (1st title)
- Runner-up: Cleveland State (2nd title game)
- Winning coach: Paul Thomas (1st title)
- MVP: Taycee Wedin (Saint Mary's)

The 2022 Women's Basketball Invitational (WBI) was a single-elimination tournament consisting of eight National Collegiate Athletic Association (NCAA) Division I teams not selected to participate in the 2022 NCAA Division I women's basketball tournament or 2022 Women's National Invitation Tournament. The 2022 field was announced March 13. The 2022 edition of the tournament was played on the campus of Transylvania University in Lexington, Kentucky at the Clive M. Beck Center. This was the second year in a row the tournament format consisted of an eight-team field played over four days, with a winners and consolation bracket, guaranteeing three games for all teams. There was no winning percentage requirement to compete in the tournament. Saint Mary's beat the defending WBI champions, Cleveland State, in the final.

== Bracket ==
5th place game March 20
Austin Peay	58
Davidson	66
7th place game March 20
Furman	69
Northeastern	61

Consolation 2nd round March 19
Furman	59
Austin Peay	73
Davidson	90
Northeastern	65

First round March 18
Bowling Green	82
Furman	61
Saint Mary's	77
Austin Peay	69
Davidson	63
Nevada	76
Cleveland State	73
Northeastern	60

Semifinals; March 19
Bowling Green	67
Saint Mary's	76
Nevada	50
Cleveland State	58

Championship; March 20
Saint Mary's	80
Cleveland State	73
3rd place game March 20
Bowling Green	73
Nevada	65

== See also ==
- 2022 NCAA Division I women's basketball tournament
- 2022 Women's National Invitation Tournament
