= Northern Sun women's basketball tournament =

- Conference basketball championship
- Sport: Basketball
- Conference: Northern Sun Intercollegiate Conference
- Number of teams: 8
- Format: Single-elimination tournament
- Current stadium: Sanford Pentagon
- Current location: Sioux Falls, SD
- Played: 2000–present
- Current champion: Concordia St. Paul (6th)
- Most championships: Minnesota–Duluth (8)
- Official website: NSIC Women's Basketball

The Northern Sun women's basketball tournament is the annual conference women's basketball championship tournament for the Northern Sun Intercollegiate Conference. The tournament has been held annually since 2000. It is a single-elimination tournament and seeding is based on regular season records.

The winner receives the conference's automatic bid to the NCAA Women's Division II Basketball Championship.

== Results ==
Year	Champions	Score	Runner-up	MVP	Venue
2000	Minnesota–Duluth	83–57	Southwest State	Sue Fiero, Minnesota–Duluth	Gangelhoff Center (St. Paul, MN)
2001	Minnesota–Duluth	53–49	Southwest State	Kate Madrinich, Minnesota–Duluth	Gangelhoff Center (St. Paul, MN)
2002	Southwest State	63–48	Minnesota–Duluth	Shelli Schoeneck, Southwest State	Gangelhoff Center (St. Paul, MN)
2003	Minnesota–Duluth	68–60	Minnesota–Crookston	Lindsey Dietz, Minnesota–Duluth	Gangelhoff Center (St. Paul, MN)
2004	Minnesota–Duluth	58–57	Concordia-St. Paul	Tanysha Scott, Minnesota–Duluth	Gangelhoff Center (St. Paul, MN)
2005	Concordia-St. Paul	86–78	Minnesota State Moorhead	Jennifer Pozzani, Concordia-St. Paul	Alex Nemzek Fieldhouse (Moorhead, MN)
2006	Wayne State	59–54	Northern State	Nicole Gruntorad, Wayne State	Rice Auditorium (Wayne, NE)
2007	Concordia-St. Paul	85–77	Minnesota State Moorhead	Katie LaViolette, Concordia-St. Paul	Gangelhoff Center (St. Paul, MN)
2008	Concordia-St. Paul	70–65	Wayne State	Katie LaViolette, Concordia-St. Paul	Gangelhoff Center (St. Paul, MN)
2009	St. Cloud State	53–41	Concordia-St. Paul	Rachel Booth, St. Cloud State	McCown Gymnasium (Winona, MN)
2010	Wayne State	77–67	Minnesota–Duluth	Mara Hjelle, Wayne State	Gangelhoff Center (St. Paul, MN)
2011	Winona State	63–61	Concordia-St. Paul	Michelle McDonald, Winona State	Gangelhoff Center (St. Paul, MN)
2012	Wayne State	62–59	Augustana (SD)	Ashley Arlen, Wayne State	Taylor Arena (Rochester, MN)
2013	Augustana (SD)	81–73	Minnesota State	Emily Schulte, Augustana (SD)	Taylor Arena (Rochester, MN)
2014	Concordia-St. Paul	54–36	Northern State	Rachel Hansen, Concordia-St. Paul	Sanford Pentagon (Sioux Falls, SD)
2015	Northern State	61–45	Wayne State	Rachel Krogman, Northern State	Sanford Pentagon (Sioux Falls, SD)
2016	Sioux Falls	75–57	Augustana (SD)	Taylor Varsho, Sioux Falls	Sanford Pentagon (Sioux Falls, SD)
2017	Northern State	55–52	Sioux Falls	Jill Conrad, Northern State	Sanford Pentagon (Sioux Falls, SD)
2018	Augustana (SD)	64–45	Winona State	Logan O’Farrell, Augustana (SD)	Sanford Pentagon (Sioux Falls, SD)
2019	Minnesota–Duluth	52–48	Minnesota State Moorhead	Sarah Grow, Minnesota–Duluth	Sanford Pentagon (Sioux Falls, SD)
2020	St. Cloud State	71–62	Minnesota–Duluth	Nikki Kilboten, St. Cloud	Sanford Pentagon (Sioux Falls, SD)
2021	Minnesota–Duluth	67–55	St. Cloud State	Brooke Olson, Minnesota–Duluth	Sanford Pentagon (Sioux Falls, SD)
2022	Minnesota–Duluth	62–39	St. Cloud State	Brooke Olson, Minnesota–Duluth	Sanford Pentagon (Sioux Falls, SD)
2023	Minnesota–Duluth	80–74	Minnesota State	Brooke Olson, Minnesota–Duluth	Sanford Pentagon (Sioux Falls, SD)
2024	Minnesota State	89–74	Mary (ND)	Joey Batt, Minnesota State	Sanford Pentagon (Sioux Falls, SD)
2025	Concordia St. Paul	92–73	Minnesota State	Lindsey Becher, Concordia	Sanford Pentagon (Sioux Falls, SD)
2026	Concordia St. Paul	79–71	Minnesota State	Lauren Wilson, Concordia St. Paul	Sanford Pentagon (Sioux Falls, SD)

== Championship appearances by school ==
School	Finals record	Finals appearances	Years
Minnesota–Duluth	8–3	11	2000, 2001, 2003, 2004, 2019, 2021, 2022, 2023
Concordia–St. Paul	6–3	9	2005, 2007, 2008, 2014, 2025, 2026
Wayne State	3–2	5	2006, 2010, 2012
Augustana	2–2	4	2013, 2018
Northern State	2–2	4	2015, 2017
St. Cloud State	2–2	4	2009, 2020
Minnesota State	1–4	5	2024
Southwest Minnesota State	1–2	3	2002
Sioux Falls	1–1	2	2016
Winona State	1–1	2	2011
Minnesota State–Moorhead	0–3	3	
Mary (ND)	0–1	1	
Minnesota–Crookston	0–1	1	

- Bemidji State, Jamestown, and Minot State have yet to reach the NSIC tournament final.
- Minnesota–Morris and Upper Iowa never reached the finals of the NSIC tournament before departing the conference.

== See also ==
- Northern Sun men's basketball tournament
