= 1992 North Star Conference women's basketball tournament =

- Classification: Division I
- Teams: 7
- Site: DeKalb, Illinois
- North Star Conference women's basketball tournaments

The 1992 North Star Conference women's basketball tournament was held at the ? in DeKalb, Illinois. The tournament began on March 5, 1992, and ended on March 7, 1992.

== North Star Conference standings ==
#	Team	Conference	Pct.	Overall	Pct.
1	Green Bay	12–0	1.000	24–7	.774
2	Northern Illinois	8–4	.667	18–14	.563
3	Valparaiso	8–4	.667	20–9	.690
4	Wright State	5–7	.417	8–20	.286
5	Cleveland State	4–8	.333	8–21	.276
6	Akron	3–9	.250	6–22	.214
7	Illinois-Chicago	2–10	.167	6–22	.214

== 1992 North Star Conference Tournament ==
Round 1 March 5
4	Wright State	68
5	Cleveland State	83
3	Valparaiso	82
6	Akron	65
2	Northern Illinois	87
7	UIC	65

Semifinals; March 6
1	Green Bay	78
5	Cleveland State	56
3	Valparaiso	72
2	Northern Illinois	87

Championship; March 7
1	Green Bay	66
2	Northern Illinois	84
