= 1990 North Star Conference women's basketball tournament =

Illinois women's basketball tournament

- Classification: Division I
- Teams: 7
- Site: DeKalb, Illinois
- Champions: Northern Illinois
- North Star Conference women's basketball tournaments

The 1990 North Star Conference women's basketball tournament was held at the ? in DeKalb, Illinois. The tournament began on March 8, 1990, and ended on March 10, 1990. Northern Illinois earned a first-round bye by finishing in first place during the regular season.

== North Star Conference standings ==
#	Team	Conference	Pct.	Overall	Pct.
1	Northern Illinois	12–0	1.000	26–5	.839
2	DePaul	10–2	.833	22–10	.688
3	Green Bay	7–5	.583	16–13	.552
4	Valparaiso	5–7	.417	12–17	.414
5	Akron	4–8	.333	10–17	.370
6	Cleveland State	2–10	.167	8–20	.286
7	Illinois-Chicago	1–11	.083	2–26	.071

== 1990 North Star Conference Tournament ==
- First round Bye Northern Illinois
- First round March 8, 1990 Green Bay 68, Cleveland State 67
- First round March 8, 1990 DePaul 83, Illinois Chicago 45
- First round March 8, 1990 Valparaiso 81, Akron 80
- Semifinals March 9, 1990 DePaul 69, Green Bay 59
- Semifinals March 9, 1990 @Northern Illinois 102, Valparaiso 79
- Championship: March 10, 1990 @Northern Illinois, 97 DePaul 85
