= 1991 North Star Conference women's basketball tournament =

- Classification: Division I
- Teams: 8
- Site: Green Bay, Wisconsin
- North Star Conference women's basketball tournaments

The 1991 North Star Conference women's basketball tournament was held in Green Bay, Wisconsin. The tournament began on March 7, 1991, and ended on March 9, 1991.

== North Star Conference standings ==
| # | Team | Conference | Pct. | Overall | Pct. |
|---|---|---|---|---|---|
| 1 | Green Bay | 13–1 | .857 | 22–6 | .786 |
| 2 | Northern Illinois | 12–2 | .857 | 25–10 | .714 |
| 3 | DePaul | 11–3 | .786 | 19–12 | .613 |
| 4 | Valparaiso | 6–8 | .429 | 16–14 | .533 |
| 5 | Illinois-Chicago | 6–8 | .429 | 9–19 | .321 |
| 6 | Wright State | 3–11 | .214 | 4–24 | .143 |
| 7 | Cleveland State | 3–11 | .214 | 7–21 | .250 |
| 8 | Akron | 2–12 | .143 | 3–25 | .107 |

== 1991 North Star Conference Tournament ==
- First round March 7, 1991, Northern Illinois 84, Cleveland State 60
- First round March 7, 1991, DePaul 72, Wright State 61
- First round March 7, 1991, Green Bay 82, Akron 44
- First round March 7, 1991, Valparaiso 81, Illinois Chicago 73
- Semifinals March 8, 1991, DePaul 91, Northern Illinois 84
- Semifinals March 8, 1991, Valparaiso 72, Green Bay 69
- Championship March 9, 1991, DePaul 100, Valparaiso 85
