= Horizon League women's soccer tournament =

American collegiate tournament

- Sport: College soccer
- Conference: Horizon League
- Number of teams: 6
- Format: Single-elimination
- Current stadium: Engelmann Stadium
- Current location: Milwaukee, WI
- Played: 1993–present
- Last contest: 2026
- Current champion: Milwaukee (19th)
- Most championships: Milwaukee (19)
- TV partner(s): ESPN3, ESPN+
- Official website: horizonleague.org/wsoc

Host stadiums
- Alumni Stadium (1993–1994); Titan Field (1995); Butler Bowl (1996, 2010); Engelmann Stadium (1997, 2000–2007, 2009, 2011–2013, 2015–2019, 2021–present); Loyola Soccer Park (1998, 2008); Alumni Field (1999); Brown Field (2014); NKU Soccer Stadium (2020)

The Horizon League women's soccer tournament is the conference championship tournament in soccer for the Horizon League. The tournament has been held every year since 1993. It is a single-elimination tournament and seeding is based on regular season records. The winner, declared conference champion, receives the conference's automatic bid to the NCAA Division I women's soccer championship.

== Champions ==
=== Finals ===
Key

- (1) – Title number
- a.e.t. – Match went to extra time
- p – Match decided by a penalty shootout after extra time
- – Winning team won regular season

=== By year ===
Venue denotes semifinals and finals location, which is the home field of the regular season champion.

Ed.	Year	Champion	Score	Runner-up	Venue / city	MVP	Ref.
1	1993	Notre Dame (1)	2–0	Xavier	Alumni Stadium • Notre Dame, Indiana	None	
2	1994	Notre Dame (2)	5–1	Butler	Alumni Stadium • Notre Dame, Indiana	Chris Johnson, Butler	
3	1995	Detroit Mercy (1)	4–0	Milwaukee	Titan Field • Detroit, Michigan	Lisa Krzykowski, Milwaukee	
4	1996	Butler (1)	3–1	Detroit Mercy	Butler Bowl • Indianapolis, Indiana	Beth Crauder, Butler	
5	1997	Milwaukee (1)	1–1 (5–4 p)	Butler	Engelmann Stadium • Milwaukee, Wisconsin	Joy Aschenbrener, Butler	
6	1998	Wright State (1)	2–1	Butler	Loyola Soccer Park • Chicago, Illinois	Randi Freeman, Wright State	
7	1999	Wright State (2)	1–1 (4–2 p)	Milwaukee	Alumni Field • Fairborn, Ohio	Randi Freeman, Wright State	
8	2000	Wright State (3)	1–0	Milwaukee	Engelmann Stadium • Milwaukee, Wisconsin	Randi Freeman, Wright State	
9	2001	Milwaukee (2)	1–0 (a.e.t.)	Butler	Engelmann Stadium • Milwaukee, Wisconsin	Erin Blaedow, Milwaukee	
10	2002	Milwaukee (3)	4–2	Butler	Engelmann Stadium • Milwaukee, Wisconsin	Lisa Bengtsson, Milwaukee	
11	2003	Loyola-Chicago (1)	1–0	Detroit Mercy	Engelmann Stadium • Milwaukee, Wisconsin	Mary Parker, Detroit Mercy	
12	2004	Detroit Mercy (2)	1–0	Milwaukee	Engelmann Stadium • Milwaukee, Wisconsin	Allison Epple, Detroit Mercy	
12	2005	Milwaukee (4)	0–0 (4–3 p)	Detroit Mercy	Engelmann Stadium • Milwaukee, Wisconsin	Erin Kane, Milwaukee	
13	2006	Loyola-Chicago (2)	2–1	Detroit Mercy	Engelmann Stadium • Milwaukee, Wisconsin	Cynthia Morote-Ariza, Loyola-Chicago	
14	2007	Loyola-Chicago (3)	2–2 (3–2 p)	Milwaukee	Engelmann Stadium • Milwaukee, Wisconsin	Cynthia Morote-Ariza, Loyola-Chicago	
15	2008	Milwaukee (5)	6–2	Loyola-Chicago	Loyola Soccer Park • Chicago, Illinois	Sarah Hagen, Milwaukee	
16	2009	Milwaukee (6)	4–0	Valparaiso	Engelmann Stadium • Milwaukee, Wisconsin	Sarah Hagen, Milwaukee	
17	2010	Milwaukee (7)	1–0	Butler	Butler Bowl • Indianapolis, Indiana	Sarah Hagen, Milwaukee	
18	2011	Milwaukee (8)	5–1	Wright State	Engelmann Stadium • Milwaukee, Wisconsin	Keara Thompson, Milwaukee	
19	2012	Milwaukee (9)	1–0 (a.e.t.)	Wright State	Engelmann Stadium • Milwaukee, Wisconsin	Krissy Dorre, Milwaukee	
20	2013	Milwaukee (10)	4–3	Oakland	Engelmann Stadium • Milwaukee, Wisconsin	Kelly Lewers, Milwaukee	
21	2014	Valparaiso (1)	1–0	Detroit Mercy	Brown Field • Valparaiso, Indiana	April Cronin, Valparaiso	
22	2015	Oakland (1)	1–0	Wright State	Engelmann Stadium • Milwaukee, Wisconsin	Joan Sieja, Oakland	
23	2016	Northern Kentucky (1)	3–2	Milwaukee	Engelmann Stadium • Milwaukee, Wisconsin	Jessica Frey, Northern Kentucky	
24	2017	IUPUI (1)	0–0 (4–3 p)	Milwaukee	Engelmann Stadium • Milwaukee, Wisconsin	Sophia Lipka, IUPUI	
25	2018	Milwaukee (11)	1–0	Cleveland State	Engelmann Stadium • Milwaukee, Wisconsin	Kelli Swenson, Milwaukee	
26	2019	Milwaukee (12)	2–0	UIC	Engelmann Stadium • Milwaukee, Wisconsin	Haley Johnson, Milwaukee	
27	2020	Milwaukee (13)	0–0 (4–3 p)	Northern Kentucky	NKU Soccer Stadium • Highland Heights, KY	Elaina LaMacchia, Milwaukee	
28	2021	Milwaukee (14)	2–0	Oakland	Engelmann Stadium • Milwaukee, Wisconsin	Lesley Kiesling, Milwaukee	
29	2022	Milwaukee (15)	1–0	Youngstown State	Engelmann Stadium • Milwaukee, Wisconsin	Haley Johnson, Milwaukee	
30	2023	Milwaukee (16)	1–0	Northern Kentucky	Engelmann Stadium • Milwaukee, Wisconsin	Brooke Parnello, Milwaukee	
31	2024	Milwaukee (17)	2–1	Northern Kentucky	Engelmann Stadium • Milwaukee, Wisconsin	Kayla Rollins, Milwaukee	
32	2025	Milwaukee (18)	4–0	Green Bay	Engelmann Stadium • Milwaukee, Wisconsin	Kristina Karlof, Milwaukee	
33	2026	Milwaukee (19)	5–2	IU Indy	Engelmann Stadium • Milwaukee, Wisconsin	Emily Petring, Milwaukee	

=== By school ===
As of 2026 Tournament

School	W	L	T	Pct.	Finals	Titles	Years won
Butler	18	16	4	.526	7	1	1996
Cleveland State	2	10	2	.214	1	0	—
Detroit Mercy	21	22	1	.489	7	2	1995, 2004
Evansville	0	1	0	.000	0	0	—
Green Bay	7	20	0	.259	1	0	—
IU Indy	4	5	3	.458	2	1	2017
La Salle	1	2	0	.333	0	0	—
Loyola-Chicago	14	14	3	.500	4	3	2003, 2006, 2007
Milwaukee	49	8	10	.806	26	19	1997, 2001, 2002, 2005, 2008, 2009, 2010, 2011, 2012, 2013, 2018, 2019, 2020, 2021, 2022, 2023, 2024, 2025, 2026
Northern Kentucky	9	8	3	.525	4	1	2016
Northern Illinois	2	3	0	.400	0	0	—
Notre Dame	6	0	0	1.000	2	2	1993, 1994
Oakland	8	6	4	.556	3	1	2015
Purdue Fort Wayne	0	3	0	.000	0	0	—
Robert Morris	2	2	0	.500	0	0	—
UIC	1	3	0	.250	1	0	—
Valparaiso	4	6	2	.417	2	1	2014
Wright State	20	24	5	.459	6	3	1998, 1999, 2000
Xavier	3	2	0	.600	1	0	—
Youngstown State	2	14	1	.147	1	0	—

Teams in italics no longer sponsor women's soccer in the Horizon League.
