= Maggy Henschler =

American soccer player (born 1999)

Personal information
- Full name: Maggy Elizabeth Henschler
- Date of birth: December 28, 1999 (age 26)
- Height: 5 ft 6 in (1.68 m)
- Position: Defender

Team information
- Current team: Fort Lauderdale United
- Number: 4

Youth career
- Rush Wisconsin

College career
Years	Team	Apps	(Gls)
2018–2021	Milwaukee Panthers	52	(6)
2022–2023	Kentucky Wildcats	35	(3)

Senior career*
Years	Team	Apps	(Gls)
2024	KIF Örebro	11	(2)
2025	Piteå IF	15	(0)
2026–	Fort Lauderdale United	0	(0)
- * Club domestic league appearances and goals as of 01:36, July 22, 2026 (UTC)

Maggy Elizabeth Henschler (born December 28, 1999) is an American professional soccer player who plays as a defender for USL Super League club Fort Lauderdale United FC. She played college soccer for the Milwaukee Panthers and the Kentucky Wildcats before starting her professional career in Sweden with Damallsvenskan clubs KIF Örebro and Piteå IF.

== Early life ==
Henschler grew up in Janesville, Wisconsin. Her father and brother both played college football, with her brother, Harry, earning NCAA Division III All-American honors at University of Wisconsin–Whitewater. Henschler began playing soccer at the age of three, eventually going on to captain club team Rush Wisconsin. She also participated in swimming, track and field, volleyball, basketball, ice hockey, and lacrosse. Once she reached high school age, she chose to focus exclusively on soccer and hockey.

At Milton High School, Henschler was a two-time all-conference first-team honoree for the soccer team. She also led the squad to regional titles in each of her years there. She also found success on the hockey rink, becoming an all-state selection and gaining prominence as one of Wisconsin's top scorers. Henschler also played hockey outside of school for the Rock County Fury. In 2018, she was named the Wisconsin State Journal's all-area girl's hockey Player of the Year.

== College career ==
=== Milwaukee Panthers ===
Henschler redshirted the 2018 NCAA season. She took the field collegiately for the first time in 2019 and went on to spend three seasons at the University of Wisconsin–Milwaukee on the Panthers soccer team. In her first year as an active player, she started all 20 games of the Panthers' season, contributing to a league-leading goals against average (GAA). The Horizon League selected her to the conference's 2019 all-freshman team. The following season was sortened by the COVID-19 pandemic. Despite playing fewer games, Henschler recorded her first collegiate goal contributions, which came in the form of 3 goals and 1 assist. On March 30, 2021, she scored twice against Green Bay after having netted her first college goal the previous match. On April 11, she tallied an assist on the game-winning goal in Milwaukee's Horizon League tournament first round victory over IUPUI.

In the 2021 fall season, Henschler rounded out her Milwaukee tenure with another season in which she started in all of the Panthers' matches. She also set personal career-highs in appearances and goals. On November 6, 2021, she scored the game-winning goal in the Horizon League tournament championship match. She was later named to the league's all-tournament team for her performances. Henschler's contributions to Milwaukee's defense led to the Panthers recording a 0.374 GAA, which was the best in the nation that season. In each of her three active campaigns with Milwaukee, Henschler helped secure Horizon League regular season and tournament titles, as well as NCAA tournament second round appearances in her final two seasons.

=== Kentucky Wildcats ===
Ahead of the 2022 season, Henschler followed Milwaukee head coach Troy Fabiano and transferred to the University of Kentucky. In her first season with the Wildcats, she made 17 starts, operating primarily as a center back. Henschler then returned to Kentucky in 2023 as a graduate student. She entered the season as a team captain and one of the Wildcats' four Southeastern Conference Preseason Watchlist nominees. Once play commenced, she went on to play the entirety of 14 matches and rank third on Kentucky in total minutes of action.

== Club career ==
=== KIF Örebro ===
Henschler spent time as a non-rostered trialist with Racing Louisville FC in the 2024 NWSL preseason, but ultimately did not sign for the club. Instead, on August 5, 2024, she was announced to have signed her first professional contract with Swedish top-division club KIF Örebro on a two-year deal. She was heralded as a potential successor to fellow American Ashley Barron, who had departed at the end of the previous season. A month later, on September 1, 2024, Henschler was named Örebro's Player of the Match after a strong performance against Kristianstad. In October, she scored her first Damallsvenskan goal, heading in the equalizer to salvage a point in the 88th minute of a match against AIK and give Örebro a slightly greater chance of avoiding relegation. The following game, Henschler scored again, this time in a 3–2 win over Trelleborg. Nevertheless, Örebro ultimately fell victim to relegation and were sent down to the Elitettan for 2025.

=== Piteå IF ===
The following year, Henschler stayed in the Damallsvenskan, moving to Piteå IF in December 2024. She joined fellow Americans Lauren Brzykcy and Emily Gray. In her sole season at Piteå, Henschler started in 14 of the team's 15 league matches and also made 3 Svenska Cupen appearances to accumulate a total of 1,428 minutes across all competitions. A thigh injury in September 2025 sidelined her for the final 11 matches of the season, preventing her from racking up more playing time. On January 30, 2026, Piteå announced Henschler's departure on a mutual contract termination.

=== Fort Lauderdale United ===
USL Super League club Fort Lauderdale United FC signed Henschler in July 2026.

== Honors and awards ==
Milwaukee Panthers

- Horizon League: 2018, 2019, 2020, 2021
- Horizon League tournament: 2018, 2019, 2020, 2021

Individual

- Horizon League all-freshman team: 2019
- Horizon League tournament all-tournament team: 2021
