= 2017 Horizon League women's soccer tournament =

- Classification: Division I
- Teams: 6
- Matches: 5
- Attendance: 1,759
- Site: Engelmann Field; Milwaukee, Wisconsin (Semifinals & Final)
- Champions: IUPUI (1st title)
- Winning coach: Chris Johnson (1st title)
- Broadcast: ESPN3

2017 Horizon League women's soccer standings
	Conf.						Overall
Team	W		L		T	PCT	W		L		T	PCT
Milwaukee ‍†‍‍	7	–	0	–	2	.889	16	–	0	–	4	.900
Northern Kentucky ‍‍‍	6	–	1	–	2	.778	9	–	6	–	2	.588
IUPUI ‍‍‡‍^{y}	6	–	2	–	1	.722	14	–	6	–	3	.674
Wright State ‍‍‍	6	–	3	–	0	.667	12	–	8	–	0	.600
UIC ‍‍‍	5	–	4	–	0	.556	7	–	13	–	0	.350
Cleveland State ‍‍‍	5	–	4	–	0	.556	9	–	9	–	1	.500
Green Bay ‍‍‍	3	–	5	–	1	.389	4	–	11	–	1	.281
Oakland ‍‍‍	3	–	6	–	0	.333	3	–	14	–	1	.194
Detroit ‍‍‍	1	–	8	–	0	.111	4	–	13	–	1	.250
Youngstown State ‍‍‍	0	–	9	–	0	.000	4	–	13	–	1	.250
† – Conference champion ‡ – 2017 Horizon League Tournament champion y – Invited to the NCAA tournament As of November 11, 2017; Rankings from United Soccer Coaches Poll; Source:Horizon League

The 2017 Horizon League women's soccer tournament was the postseason women's soccer tournament for the Horizon League. It was held from October 30 through November 4, 2017. The quarterfinals of the tournament were held at campus sites, while semifinals and final took place at Engelmann Field in Milwaukee, Wisconsin. The six team single-elimination tournament consisted of three rounds based on seeding from regular season conference play. The Northern Kentucky Norse were the defending champions, but they were eliminated from the 2017 tournament with a 3–2 loss to the IUPUI Jaguars in the semifinals. IUPUI won the tournament by virtue of winning the penalty shoot-out tiebreaking procedure following a tie with the Milwaukee Panthers in the final.

== Bracket ==
Semifinal matchups were determined by the results of the quarterfinals. The #1 seed would play the lowest-remaining seed, while the #2 seed would play the other quarterfinal winner.

Quarterfinals; Monday, Oct. 30
4	Wright State	2
5	UIC	1
3	IUPUI	1 (4)
6	Cleveland State	1 (2)

Semifinals; Thursday, Nov. 2
1	Milwaukee	2^{2OT}
4	Wright State	1
2	Northern Kentucky	2
3	IUPUI	3

Final; Saturday, Nov. 4
1	Milwaukee	0 (3)
3	IUPUI	0 (4)

== Schedule ==
=== Quarterfinals ===
October 30, 2017	#3 IUPUI	1–1 (a.e.t.) (4–2 p)	#6 Cleveland State	Indianapolis, Indiana
7:00 p.m. EDT	Valentine Pursey 79'	Report	37' Aliani Lorenzo	Stadium: Carroll Stadium; Attendance: 241; Referee: Jorge Cuate; Assistant referees: Eulogio Villalpando; Sean West; Fourth official: Nick Thompson
	Penalties
	Miranda Ricks (penalty scored); Hayley Shelton (penalty scored); Sarah Jacobs (penalty scored); Braegan Lyon (penalty scored)		(penalty missed) Sydney Duggan; (penalty scored) Katie Bainbridge; (penalty scored) Jenna Prathapa; (penalty missed) Ashley Thiss

October 30, 2017	#4 Wright State	2–1	#5 UIC	Dayton, Ohio
7:00 p.m. EDT	Destiny Johnson 59'; Sarah Colvin 78'	Report	21' Tamae Douglas	Stadium: Alumni Field; Attendance: 252; Referee: Josh Kelley; Assistant referees: Jeff Swartzel; Brian Apswich; Fourth official: Andrey Castel

=== Semifinals ===
November 2, 2017	#2 Northern Kentucky	2–3	#3 IUPUI	Milwaukee, Wisconsin
4:00 p.m. CDT	Jessica Frey 17'; Samantha Duwel 79'	Report	49', 84' (pen.), 89' Valentine Pursey	Stadium: Engelmann Field; Attendance: 111; Referee: Khalef Al-Latayfeh; Assistant referees: Dimitar Chavdarov; Art Arustamyan; Fourth official: Kyle Trimble

November 2, 2017	#1 Milwaukee	2–1 (a.e.t.)	#4 Wright State	Milwaukee, Wisconsin
7:00 p.m. CDT	Mackenzie Schill 44'; Lourdes Onwuemeka 102'	Report	18' Erin Graefen	Stadium: Engelmann Field; Attendance: 444; Referee: Michael Allie; Assistant referees: Justin Tatsak; Nicole Green; Fourth official: Kyle Trimble

=== Final ===
November 4, 2017	#1 Milwaukee	0–0 (a.e.t.) (3–4 p)	#3 IUPUI	Milwaukee, Wisconsin
6:00 p.m. CDT		Report		Stadium: Engelmann Field; Attendance: 711; Referee: Shane Butler; Assistant referees: Kurt Stefan; Andres Padilla; Fourth official: Victor Gonzalez
	Penalties
	McKaela Schmelzer (penalty scored); Cassidy Blanchard (penalty missed); Aubrey Krahn (penalty scored); Anny West (penalty scored); Sydney Senn (penalty missed)		(penalty scored) Sarah Jacobs; (penalty missed) Hayley Shelton; (penalty scored) Miranda Ricks; (penalty scored) Heily Blacha; (penalty scored) Valentine Pursey

== Statistics ==
=== Goalscorers ===
4 Goals

- Valentine Pursey - IUPUI

1 Goal

- Sarah Colvin - Wright State
- Samantha Duwel - Northern Kentucky
- Tamae Douglas - UIC
- Jessica Frey - Northern Kentucky
- Erin Graefen - Wright State
- Destiny Johnson - Wright State
- Aliani Lorenzo - Cleveland State
- Lourdes Onwuemeka - Milwaukee
- Mackenzie Schill - Milwaukee

== See also ==
- 2017 Horizon League Men's Soccer Tournament
