= 2024 Horizon League women's soccer tournament =

- Classification: Division I
- Teams: 6
- Matches: 5
- Attendance: 1,617
- Site: Engelmann Field; Milwaukee, Wisconsin (Semifinals & Final)
- Champions: Milwaukee (17th title)
- Winning coach: Kevin Boyd (3rd title)
- MVP: Kayla Rollins (Milwaukee)
- Broadcast: ESPN+

2024 Horizon League women's soccer standings
	Conf.						Overall
Team	W		L		T	PCT	W		L		T	PCT
Milwaukee ‍†‍‡‍^{y}	9	–	0	–	1	.950	12	–	7	–	2	.619
Northern Kentucky ‍‍‍	8	–	1	–	1	.850	12	–	7	–	1	.625
Detroit Mercy ‍‍‍	7	–	1	–	2	.800	10	–	8	–	2	.550
Robert Morris ‍‍‍	4	–	3	–	3	.550	6	–	7	–	7	.475
IU Indy ‍‍‍	4	–	4	–	2	.500	5	–	11	–	3	.342
Purdue Fort Wayne ‍‍‍	4	–	6	–	0	.400	9	–	10	–	1	.475
Wright State ‍‍‍	3	–	5	–	2	.400	5	–	10	–	2	.353
Green Bay ‍‍‍	2	–	5	–	3	.350	4	–	8	–	5	.382
Youngstown State ‍‍‍	3	–	7	–	0	.300	5	–	11	–	2	.333
Oakland ‍‍‍	2	–	8	–	0	.200	3	–	14	–	2	.211
Cleveland State ‍‍‍	2	–	8	–	0	.200	2	–	14	–	1	.147
† – Conference champion ‡ – 2024 Horizon League Tournament champion y – Invited to the NCAA Tournament; As of December 10, 2024; Rankings from United Soccer Coaches Poll; Source:Horizon League

The 2024 Horizon League women's soccer tournament was the postseason women's soccer tournament for the Horizon League. It was held from November 3 through November 9, 2024. The quarterfinals of the tournament were held at campus sites, while semifinals and final took place at Engelmann Field in Milwaukee, Wisconsin. The six team single-elimination tournament consisted of three rounds based on seeding from regular season conference play. The Milwaukee Panthers were the defending champions, and they successfully defended their title by beating the second seed Northern Kentucky Norse 2–1 in the final. This was the seventeenth overall title for Milwaukee and third for head coach Kevin Boyd. This was also Milwaukee's seventh consecutive title and second straight year they defeated Northern Kentucky in the final. As tournament champions, Milwaukee earned the Horizon League's automatic berth into the 2024 NCAA Division I women's soccer tournament.

== Seeding ==
The top six Horizon League teams from the regular season earned berths in the tournament. Teams were seeded by conference record. No tiebreakers were required as each of the top seven teams finished with a unique regular season conference record.

Seed	School	Conference Record	Points
1	Milwaukee	9–0–1	28
2	Northern Kentucky	8–1–1	25
3	Detroit Mercy	7–1–2	23
4	Robert Morris	4–3–3	15
5	IU Indy	4–4–2	14
6	Purdue Fort Wayne	4–6–0	12

== Bracket ==
Semifinal matchups were determined by the results of the quarterfinals. The #1 seed would play the lowest-remaining seed, while the #2 seed would play the other quarterfinal winner.

Quarterfinals; Sunday, Nov. 3
4	Robert Morris (a.e.t.)	1
5	IU Indy	0
3	Detroit Mercy	2
6	Purdue Fort Wayne	1

Semifinals; Thursday, Nov. 7
1	Milwaukee	7
4	Robert Morris	0
2	Northern Kentucky	1
3	Detroit Mercy	0

Final; Saturday, Nov. 9
1	Milwaukee	2
2	Northern Kentucky	1

== Schedule ==
=== Quarterfinals ===
November 3, 2024	#3 Detroit Mercy	2–1	#6 Purdue Fort Wayne	Detroit, MI
1:00 p.m. EST	Sam Sickinger 39'; Soraya Puerto Khalil 58'; Marisa Silver (yellow card) 67'	Report	10' Audriana Rhyner; (yellow card) 18' Allison Adams	Stadium: Titan Field; Attendance: 222; Referee: Austin Saini; Assistant referees: David Eberline; Timothy Dicken; Fourth official: Donovan Noocha

November 3, 2024	#4 Robert Morris	1–0 (a.e.t.)	#5 IU Indy	Moon Township, PA
1:00 p.m. EST	Jillian Marvin 92'	Report	(yellow card) 79' Kailyn Smith; (yellow card) 88' Team	Stadium: North Athletic Complex; Attendance: 263; Referee: Atahan Yaya; Assistant referees: John Safar; Ali Zolghamain; Fourth official: Chris Regan

=== Semifinals ===
November 7, 2024	#1 Milwaukee	7–0	#4 Robert Morris	Milwaukee, WI
1:00 p.m. CST	Kayla Rollins 6', 25', 70'; Lainey Higgins 7'; Kristina Karlof 14'; Jenni Adjelic 57'; Emily Petring 85'	Report		Stadium: Engelmann Field; Attendance: 356; Referee: Nicholas Balcer; Assistant referees: Laura Snyder; Saki Atsas; Fourth official: Kyle Trimble

November 7, 2024	#2 Northern Kentucky	1–0	#3 Detroit Mercy	Milwaukee, WI
4:00 p.m. CST	Kylie Anderson 16'; Maria Wiefering (yellow card) 39'; Team (yellow card) 54'; Emilie Doersching (yellow card) 68'; Lilly Yordy (yellow card) 82'	Report	(yellow card) 89' Team	Stadium: Engelmann Field; Attendance: 141; Referee: Calin Radosav; Assistant referees: Alex Hofstetter; Ryan Hoirnik; Fourth official: Joseluis Garcia

=== Final ===
November 9, 2024	#1 Milwaukee	2–1	#2 Northern Kentucky	Milwaukee, WI
1:00 p.m. CST	Kayla Rollins 31', 66' (pen.)	Report	(yellow card) 52' Erykah Cornett; 59' Emilie Doersching	Stadium: Engelmann Field; Attendance: 635; Referee: Heber Estrada; Assistant referees: John Kennedy; Kurt Stefan; Fourth official: Joseluis Garcia

== Statistics ==
=== Goalscorers ===
There were 15 goals scored in 5 matches, for an average of 3 goals per match.

5 goals

- Kayla Rollins – Milwaukee

1 goal

- Jenni Adjelic – Milwaukee
- Kylie Anderson – Northern Kentucky
- Emilie Doersching – Northern Kentucky
- Kristina Karlof – Milwaukee
- Soraya Puerto Khalil – Detroit Mercy
- Lainey Higgins – Milwaukee
- Jillian Marvin – Robert Morris
- Emily Petring – Milwaukee
- Audriana Rhyner – Purdue Fort Wayne
- Sam Sickinger – Detroit Mercy

== All-Tournament team ==
Player	Team
Soraya Puerto Khalil	Detroit Mercy
Marisa Silver	Detroit Mercy
Lainey Higgins	Milwaukee
Senya Meurer	Milwaukee
Elizabeth Reece	Milwaukee
**Kayla Rollins**	Milwaukee
Kylie Anderson	Northern Kentucky
Emilie Doersching	Northern Kentucky
Kaya Vogt	Northern Kentucky
Jill Marvin	Robert Morris
Brenna Murray	Robert Morris

MVP in bold
