= 2021 Horizon League women's soccer tournament =

- Classification: Division I
- Teams: 6
- Matches: 5
- Attendance: 1,324
- Site: Engelmann Field; Milwaukee, Wisconsin (Semifinals & Final)
- Champions: Milwaukee (14th title)
- Winning coach: Troy Fabiano (4th title)
- MVP: Lesley Kiesling (Milwaukee)
- Broadcast: ESPN+

2021 Horizon League women's soccer standings
	Conf.						Overall
Team	W		L		T	PCT	W		L		T	PCT
Milwaukee ‍†‍‡‍^{y}	11	–	0	–	0	1.000	18	–	1	–	0	.947
Oakland ‍‍‍	9	–	1	–	1	.864	11	–	9	–	1	.548
Northern Kentucky ‍‍‍	7	–	4	–	0	.636	10	–	8	–	2	.550
Green Bay ‍‍‍	4	–	2	–	5	.591	8	–	3	–	6	.647
Cleveland State ‍‍‍	5	–	5	–	1	.500	6	–	11	–	2	.368
Purdue Fort Wayne ‍‍‍	4	–	5	–	2	.455	5	–	8	–	6	.421
Wright State ‍‍‍	3	–	6	–	2	.364	5	–	10	–	3	.361
IUPUI ‍‍‍	3	–	6	–	2	.364	4	–	11	–	3	.306
Youngstown State ‍‍‍	2	–	5	–	4	.364	2	–	11	–	5	.250
Robert Morris ‍‍‍	2	–	6	–	3	.318	6	–	10	–	3	.395
Detroit Mercy ‍‍‍	2	–	7	–	2	.273	3	–	13	–	2	.222
UIC ‍‍‍	2	–	7	–	2	.273	2	–	12	–	3	.206
† – Conference champion ‡ – 2021 Horizon League Tournament champion y – Invited to the NCAA tournament As of December 7, 2021; Rankings from United Soccer Coaches Poll; Source:Horizon League

The 2021 Horizon League women's soccer tournament was the postseason women's soccer tournament for the Horizon League. It was held from October 31 through November 6, 2021. The quarterfinals of the tournament were held at campus sites, while semifinals and final took place at Engelmann Field in Milwaukee, Wisconsin. The six team single-elimination tournament consisted of three rounds based on seeding from regular season conference play. The Milwaukee Panthers were the defending champions, and they successfully defended their title by beating the Oakland Golden Grizzlies 2–0 in the final. This was the fourteenth overall title for Milwaukee and fourth for head coach Troy Fabiano. This was also Milwaukee's fourth consecutive title. As tournament champions, Milwaukee earned the Horizon League's automatic berth into the 2021 NCAA Division I Women's Soccer Tournament.

== Seeding ==
Six Horizon League schools participated in the tournament, and teams were seeded by conference record. No tiebreakers were required as each team finished with a unique points total.

Seed	School	Conference Record	Points
1	Milwaukee	11–0–0	33
2	Oakland	9–1–1	28
3	Northern Kentucky	7–4–0	21
4	Green Bay	4–2–5	17
5	Cleveland State	5–5–1	16
6	Purdue Fort Wayne	4–5–2	14

== Bracket ==
Semifinal matchups were determined by the results of the quarterfinals. The #1 seed would play the lowest-remaining seed, while the #2 seed would play the other quarterfinal winner.

Quarterfinals; Monday, Oct. 31
4	Green Bay	4
5	Cleveland State	0
3	Northern Kentucky (a.e.t.)	1
6	Purdue Fort Wayne	0

Semifinals; Thursday, Nov. 4
1	Milwaukee	2
4	Green Bay	0
2	Oakland	3
3	Northern Kentucky	1

Final; Saturday, Nov. 5
1	Milwaukee	2
2	Oakland	0

== Schedule ==
=== Quarterfinals ===
October 31, 2021	#3 Northern Kentucky	1–0 (a.e.t.)	#6 Purdue Fort Wayne	Highland Heights, KY
1:00 p.m. ET	Megan Sullivan 97'	Report	(yellow card) 82' Morgan Reitano; (yellow card) 90' Kelsey Gallagher	Stadium: NKU Soccer Stadium; Attendance: 267; Referee: Kevin Fikar; Assistant referees: Noah Matos; James Duling; Fourth official: Brandon Cusmano

October 31, 2021	#4 Green Bay	4–0	#5 Cleveland State	Green Bay, WI
1:00 p.m. CT	Emily Murphy 10', 39'; McKayla Kertscher 35'; Morgan Myers (yellow card) 75'; Hannah Bennett 79'	Report		Stadium: Aldo Santaga Stadium; Attendance: 147; Referee: Art Arustamyan; Assistant referees: Sean West; Tim Csuri; Fourth official: Anthony Voulgaris

=== Semifinals ===
November 4, 2021	#1 Milwaukee	2–0	#4 Green Bay	Milwaukee, WI
1:00 p.m. CT	Lesley Kiesling 25'; Rachel Phillpotts 85'	Report		Stadium: Engelmann Field; Attendance: 341; Referee: Brian Miller; Assistant referees: Ali Zolgharnian; Ryan Slack; Fourth official: Quinton McFarlen

November 4, 2021	#2 Oakland	3–1	#3 Northern Kentucky	Milwaukee, WI
4:00 p.m. CT	Maggie Rimer 15'; Sharon Sampson 34'; Ashley Postma 59'	Report	55' Lydia Self; (yellow card) 82' Lindsey Meyer; (yellow card) 84' Emma McSwigan	Stadium: Engelmann Field; Attendance: 138; Referee: Heber Estada; Assistant referees: Shane Richards; Khalef Al-Latayfeh; Fourth official: Quinton McFarlen

=== Final ===
November 6, 2021	#1 Milwaukee	2–0	#2 Oakland	Milwaukee, WI
1:00 p.m. CT	Maggy Henschler 24'; Lesley Kiesling 76'	Report	(yellow card) 38' Brooke Honeycutt; (yellow card) 55' Vera Asare; (yellow card) 78' Sami Lopez	Stadium: Engelmann Field; Attendance: 431; Referee: Nicholas Balcer; Assistant referees: Steve Besk; Justin Tatsak; Fourth official: Quinton McFarlen

== Statistics ==
=== Goalscorers ===
There were 13 goals scored in 5 matches, for an average of 2.6 goals per match (as of November 6, 2021).

2 goals

- Emily Murphy – Green Bay
- Lesley Kiesling – Milwaukee

1 goal

- Hannah Bennett – Green Bay
- McKayla Kertscher – Green Bay
- Maggy Henschler – Milwaukee
- Rachel Philpotts – Milwaukee
- Lydia Self – Northern Kentucky
- Megan Sullivan – Northern Kentucky
- Ashley Postma – Oakland
- Sharon Sampson – Oakland
- Maggie Rimer – Oakland

== All-Tournament team ==
Player	Team
**Lesley Kiesling**	Milwaukee
Elaina LaMacchia	Milwaukee
Maggy Henschler	Milwaukee
Rachel Phillpotts	Milwaukee
Sami Lopez	Oakland
Sophie Wilsey	Oakland
Kendra Zak	Oakland
Savanna Hayes	Green Bay
Emily Murphy	Green Bay
Lydia Self	Northern Kentucky
Megan Sullivan	Northern Kentucky

MVP in bold
