= 2025 Horizon League women's soccer tournament =

- Classification: Division I
- Teams: 6
- Matches: 5
- Attendance: 2,096
- Site: Engelmann Stadium; Milwaukee, Wisconsin (Semifinals & Final)
- Champions: Milwaukee (18th title)
- Winning coach: Kevin Boyd (4th title)
- MVP: Kristina Karlof (Milwaukee)
- Broadcast: ESPN+

2025 Horizon League women's soccer standings
	Conf.						Overall
Team	W		L		T	PCT	W		L		T	PCT
Milwaukee ‍†‍‍	8	–	0	–	2	.900	11	–	4	–	3	.694
Northern Kentucky ‍‍‍	7	–	1	–	2	.800	10	–	2	–	6	.722
Youngstown State ‍‍‍	6	–	2	–	2	.700	8	–	10	–	2	.450
Wright State ‍‍‍	4	–	1	–	5	.650	7	–	7	–	5	.500
Green Bay ‍‍‍	4	–	3	–	3	.550	7	–	8	–	4	.474
Oakland ‍‍‍	2	–	2	–	6	.500	4	–	7	–	8	.421
IU Indy ‍‍‍	3	–	5	–	2	.400	4	–	11	–	3	.306
Cleveland State ‍‍‍	1	–	3	–	6	.400	4	–	6	–	7	.441
Robert Morris ‍‍‍	2	–	5	–	3	.350	4	–	9	–	4	.353
Purdue Fort Wayne ‍‍‍	1	–	9	–	0	.100	2	–	15	–	1	.139
Detroit Mercy ‍‍‍	0	–	7	–	3	.150	2	–	13	–	3	.194
† – Conference champion ‡ – 2025 Horizon League Tournament champion y – Invited to the NCAA Tournament; As of November 3, 2025; Rankings from United Soccer Coaches Poll; Source:Horizon League

The 2025 Horizon League women's soccer tournament is the postseason women's soccer tournament for the Horizon League. It is being held from November 2 through November 8, 2025. The quarterfinals of the tournament were held at campus sites, while semifinals and final took place at Engelmann Stadium in Milwaukee, Wisconsin. The six team single-elimination tournament consisted of three rounds based on seeding from regular season conference play. The Milwaukee Panthers are the seven-time defending champions, and they successfully defended their title by beating the fifth seed Green Bay Phoenix 4–0 in the final. This was the eighteenth overall title for Milwaukee and fourth for head coach Kevin Boyd. As tournament champions, Milwaukee earned the Horizon League's automatic berth into the 2025 NCAA Division I women's soccer tournament.

== Seeding ==
The top six Horizon League teams from the regular season earned berths in the tournament. Teams were seeded by conference record. No tiebreakers were required as each of the top seven teams finished with a unique regular season conference record.

Seed	School	Conference Record	Points
1	Milwaukee	8–0–2	26
2	Northern Kentucky	7–1–2	23
3	Youngstown State	6–2–2	20
4	Wright State	4–1–5	17
5	Green Bay	4–3–3	15
6	Oakland	2–2–6	12

== Bracket ==
Semifinal matchups were determined by the results of the quarterfinals. The #1 seed would play the lowest-remaining seed, while the #2 seed would play the other quarterfinal winner.

Quarterfinals; Sunday, Nov. 2
3	Youngstown State	0
6	Oakland (a.e.t.)	1
4	Wright State	1
5	Green Bay	3

Semifinals; Thursday, Nov. 6
1	Milwaukee	3
6	Oakland	0
2	Northern Kentucky	1
5	Green Bay	2

Final; Saturday, Nov. 8
1	Milwaukee	4
5	Green Bay	0

== Schedule ==
=== Quarterfinals ===
November 2, 2025	#3 Youngstown State	0–1 (a.e.t.)	#6 Oakland	Youngstown, OH
1:00 p.m. EST		Report	(yellow card) 86' Ella Shapiro; 99' Mallory Anderson	Stadium: Farmers National Bank Field; Attendance: 532; Referee: Christopher Lauer; Assistant referees: Roy Miller; Erik Blackburn; Fourth official: John Groff

November 2, 2025	#4 Wright State	1–3	#5 Green Bay	Dayton, OH
1:00 p.m. EST	Addy Canter 39'; Caitlin Burger (yellow card) 65'	Report	18' Nell Smith; 45' Isabella Brozek; 58' Senah Hanes; (yellow card) 76' Peyton Cornejo	Stadium: Alumni Field; Attendance: 275; Referee: Braeden Frey; Assistant referees: Mykela Hawkins; Laura Snyder; Fourth official: Shawn Westerfield

=== Semifinals ===
November 6, 2025	#1 Milwaukee	3–0	#6 Oakland	Milwaukee, WI
1:00 p.m. CST	Kiersten White 11'; Kristina Karlof 51'; Emily Petring 68'	Report	(yellow card) 77' Bella Haynes	Stadium: Engelmann Stadium; Attendance: 404; Referee: Heber Estrada; Assistant referees: Saki Atsas; Ramy Akram-Ahmed; Fourth official: Christopher Spasovici

November 6, 2025	#2 Northern Kentucky	1–2	#5 Green Bay	Milwaukee, WI
4:00 p.m. CST	Erykah Cornett 33'; Meghan Belrose (yellow card) 66'	Report	Laney Stark 23', 54'	Stadium: Engelmann Stadium; Attendance: 414; Referee: Nick Balcer; Assistant referees: Josh Braunstein; Adrian Werbicki; Fourth official: Kyle Trimble

=== Final ===
November 8, 2025	#1 Milwaukee	4–0	#5 Green Bay	Milwaukee, WI
1:00 p.m. CST	Zoey Pagels 10'; Kristina Karlof 15'; Lola Wojcik 62', 83'; Jenni Andjelic (yellow card) 88'	Report		Stadium: Engelmann Stadium; Attendance: 471; Referee: Dimitar Chavdarov; Assistant referees: Jordan Dietrich; David Irwin; Fourth official: Fernando Riveros

== Statistics ==
=== Goalscorers ===
There were 15 goals scored in 5 matches, for an average of 3 goals per match.

2 goals

- Kristina Karlof – Milwaukee
- Laney Stark – Green Bay
- Lola Wojcik – Milwaukee

1 goal

- Mallory Anderson – Oakland
- Isabella Brozek – Green Bay
- Addy Canter – Wright State
- Erykah Cornett – Northern Kentucky
- Senah Hanes – Green Bay
- Zoey Pagels – Milwaukee
- Emily Petring – Milwaukee
- Nell Smith – Green Bay
- Kiersten White – Milwaukee

== All-Tournament team ==
Player	Team
Anna Scott	Green Bay
Laney Stark	Green Bay
Becca Stoeckmann	Green Bay
Anna Champine	Milwaukee
Bella Hollenbach	Milwaukee
**Kristina Karlof**	Milwaukee
Lola Wojcik	Milwaukee
Meghan Belrose	Northern Kentucky
Erykah Cornett	Northern Kentucky
Mallory Anderson	Oakland
Brae Cole	Oakland

MVP in bold
