= 2022 Horizon League women's soccer tournament =

- Classification: Division I
- Teams: 6
- Matches: 5
- Attendance: 1,524
- Site: Engelmann Field; Milwaukee, Wisconsin (Semifinals & Final)
- Champions: Milwaukee (15th title)
- Winning coach: Kevin Boyd (1st title)
- MVP: Haley Johnson (Milwaukee)
- Broadcast: ESPN+

2022 Horizon League women's soccer standings
	Conf.						Overall
Team	W		L		T	PCT	W		L		T	PCT
Milwaukee ‍†‍‡‍^{y}	7	–	1	–	2	.800	12	–	4	–	3	.711
Purdue Fort Wayne ‍‍‍	5	–	1	–	4	.700	9	–	4	–	6	.632
Oakland ‍‍‍	5	–	2	–	3	.650	8	–	4	–	7	.605
Wright State ‍‍‍	5	–	2	–	3	.650	8	–	7	–	3	.528
Youngstown State ‍‍‍	5	–	3	–	2	.600	8	–	8	–	3	.500
IUPUI ‍‍‍	4	–	3	–	3	.550	9	–	4	–	6	.632
Cleveland State ‍‍‍	4	–	4	–	2	.500	7	–	6	–	4	.529
Detroit Mercy ‍‍‍	4	–	6	–	0	.400	6	–	10	–	1	.382
Northern Kentucky ‍‍‍	2	–	7	–	1	.250	2	–	11	–	2	.200
Robert Morris ‍‍‍	1	–	7	–	2	.200	7	–	7	–	4	.500
Green Bay ‍‍‍	1	–	7	–	2	.200	3	–	11	–	2	.250
† – Conference champion ‡ – 2022 Horizon League Tournament champion y – Invited to the NCAA Tournament; As of December 6, 2022; Rankings from United Soccer Coaches Poll; Source:Horizon League

The 2022 Horizon League women's soccer tournament was the postseason women's soccer tournament for the Horizon League. It was held from October 30 through November 5, 2022. The quarterfinals of the tournament were held at campus sites, while semifinals and final took place at Engelmann Field in Milwaukee, Wisconsin. The six team single-elimination tournament consisted of three rounds based on seeding from regular season conference play. The Milwaukee Panthers were the defending champions, and they successfully defended their title by beating the Youngstown State Penguins 1–0 in the final. This was the fifteenth overall title for Milwaukee and first for head coach Kevin Boyd. This was also Milwaukee's fifth consecutive title. As tournament champions, Milwaukee earned the Horizon League's automatic berth into the 2022 NCAA Division I women's soccer tournament.

== Seeding ==
Six Horizon League schools participated in the tournament. Teams were seeded by conference record. A tiebreaker was required to determine the third and fourth seeds as Oakland and Wright State both finished with a 5–2–3 regular season conference record. Oakland was awarded the third seed due to their 3–1 regular season victory over Wright State on October 16.

Seed	School	Conference Record	Points
1	Milwaukee	7–1–2	23
2	Purdue Fort Wayne	5–1–4	19
3	Oakland	5–2–3	18
4	Wright State	5–2–3	18
5	Youngstown State	5–3–2	17
6	IUPUI	4–3–3	15

== Bracket ==
Semifinal matchups were determined by the results of the quarterfinals. The #1 seed would play the lowest-remaining seed, while the #2 seed would play the other quarterfinal winner.

Quarterfinals; Sunday, Oct. 30
4	Wright State	1
5	Youngstown State	2
3	Oakland	0
6	IUPUI	2

Semifinals; Thursday, Nov. 3
1	Milwaukee	3
6	IUPUI	1
2	Purdue Fort Wayne	0
5	Youngstown State	1

Final; Saturday, Nov. 5
1	Milwaukee	1
5	Youngstown State	0

== Schedule ==
=== Quarterfinals ===
October 30	#3 Oakland	0–2	#6 IUPUI	Rochester, MI
1:00 p.m. ET	Sami Lopez (yellow card) 56'	Report	12' Sarah Henson; 51' Emma Antoine; (yellow card) 62' Abbie Schad; (yellow card) 67' Maya Turner	Stadium: Oakland Soccer Field; Attendance: 102; Referee: Kevin Fikar; Assistant referees: Courtney Hayworth; Maggie Short; Fourth official: Ted Grigoriou

October 30	#4 Wright State	1–2	#5 Youngstown State	Dayton, OH
1:00 p.m. ET	Olivia Mace (yellow card) 65'; Michelle Rings (yellow card) 66', (goal) 87' (pen.)	Report	35' (pen.), 86' Taylor Berry; (yellow card) 67' Emma Rignone	Stadium: Alumni Field; Attendance: 514

=== Semifinals ===
November 3	#1 Milwaukee	3–1	#6 IUPUI	Milwaukee, WI
1:00 p.m. CT	Haley Johnson 54', 86'; Kayla Rollins (yellow card) 58'; Senya Meurer 59'	Report	12' Milwaukee Own Goal; (yellow card) 65' Sophia White	Stadium: Engelmann Field; Referee: Brian Miller; Assistant referees: Khalaf Al Latayfeh; John Safar; Fourth official: Alex Hofstetter

November 3	#2 Purdue Fort Wayne	0–1	#5 Youngstown State	Milwaukee, WI
4:00 p.m. CT	Abby Klimkowski (yellow card) 76'	Report	Abriana Rondin 51'; Regan LaVigna (yellow card) 58'; Maddie Angelo (yellow card) 83'	Stadium: Engelmann Field; Attendance: 573; Referee: Heber Estrada; Assistant referees: Brian McKay; Quinton McFarlen; Fourth official: Alex Hofstetter

=== Final ===
November 5	#1 Milwaukee	1–0	#5 Youngstown State	Milwaukee, WI
1:00 p.m. CT	Haley Johnson 24'	Report		Stadium: Engelmann Field; Attendance: 335; Referee: Nicholas Balcer; Assistant referees: Jason White; Justin Tatsak; Fourth official: Alex Hofstetter

== Statistics ==
=== Goalscorers ===
There were 11 goals scored in 5 matches, for an average of 2.2 goals per match (as of November 5, 2022).

3 goals

- Haley Johnson – Milwaukee

2 goals

- Taylor Berry – Youngstown State

1 goal

- Emma Antoine – IUPUI
- Sarah Henson – IUPUI
- Senya Meurer – Milwaukee
- Michelle Rings – Wright State
- Abriana Rondin – Youngstown State

1 own goal

- Milwaukee (vs IUPUI)

== All-Tournament team ==
Player	Team
Kendall Edwards	Milwaukee
Lainey Higgins	Milwaukee
Senya Meurer	Milwaukee
**Haley Johnson**	Milwaukee
Taylor Berry	Youngstown State
Brooklynn Kirkpatrick	Youngstown State
Abriana Rondin	Youngstown State
Ashton Kudlo	IUPUI
Maya Turner	IUPUI
Gabrielle Fanning	Purdue Fort Wayne
Isabelle Wissel	Purdue Fort Wayne

MVP in bold
