= 2023 Horizon League women's soccer tournament =

- Classification: Division I
- Teams: 6
- Matches: 5
- Attendance: 1,311
- Site: Engelmann Field; Milwaukee, Wisconsin (Semifinals & Final)
- Champions: Milwaukee (16th title)
- Winning coach: Kevin Boyd (2nd title)
- MVP: Brooke Parnello (Milwaukee)
- Broadcast: ESPN+

2023 Horizon League women's soccer standings
	Conf.						Overall
Team	W		L		T	PCT	W		L		T	PCT
Milwaukee ‍†‍‡‍^{y}	7	–	0	–	3	.850	12	–	3	–	5	.725
IUPUI ‍‍‍	5	–	1	–	4	.700	11	–	3	–	5	.711
Northern Kentucky ‍‍‍	4	–	2	–	4	.600	8	–	3	–	8	.632
Robert Morris ‍‍‍	5	–	4	–	1	.550	12	–	5	–	3	.675
Wright State ‍‍‍	4	–	3	–	3	.550	6	–	7	–	5	.472
Detroit Mercy ‍‍‍	5	–	5	–	0	.500	7	–	9	–	3	.447
Oakland ‍‍‍	3	–	2	–	5	.550	5	–	6	–	7	.472
Youngstown State ‍‍‍	3	–	5	–	2	.400	7	–	7	–	3	.500
Purdue Fort Wayne ‍‍‍	2	–	4	–	4	.400	5	–	7	–	6	.444
Cleveland State ‍‍‍	1	–	6	–	3	.250	4	–	10	–	3	.324
Green Bay ‍‍‍	0	–	7	–	3	.150	0	–	11	–	5	.156
† – Conference champion ‡ – 2023 Horizon League Tournament champion y – Invited to the NCAA Tournament; As of December 5, 2023; Rankings from United Soccer Coaches Poll; Source: Horizon League

The 2023 Horizon League women's soccer tournament was the postseason women's soccer tournament for the Horizon League. It was held from October 29 through November 4, 2023. The quarterfinals of the tournament were held at campus sites, while semifinals and final took place at Engelmann Field in Milwaukee, Wisconsin. The six team single-elimination tournament consisted of three rounds based on seeding from regular season conference play. The Milwaukee Panthers were the defending champions, and they successfully defended their title by beating the Northern Kentucky Norse 1–0 in the final. This was the sixteenth overall title for Milwaukee and second for head coach Kevin Boyd. This was also Milwaukee's sixth consecutive title. As tournament champions, Milwaukee earned the Horizon League's automatic berth into the 2023 NCAA Division I women's soccer tournament.

== Seeding ==
Six Horizon League schools participated in the tournament. Teams were seeded by conference record. Northern Kentucky won the third-seed tiebreaker by winning the season head-to-head against Robert Morris, while Wright State did the same over Detroit Mercy to take the fifth seed.

Seed	School	Conference Record	Points
1	Milwaukee	7–0–3	24
2	Purdue Fort Wayne	5–1–4	19
3	Oakland	4–2–4	16
4	Wright State	5–4–1	16
5	Youngstown State	4–3–3	15
6	IUPUI	5–5–0	15

== Bracket ==
Semifinal matchups were determined by the results of the quarterfinals. The #1 seed would play the lowest-remaining seed, while the #2 seed would play the other quarterfinal winner.

Quarterfinals; Sunday, Oct. 29
4	Robert Morris	4
5	Wright State	1
3	Northern Kentucky	1
6	Detroit Mercy	0

Semifinals; Thursday, Nov. 2
1	Milwaukee	5
4	Robert Morris	0
2	IUPUI	1 (3)
3	Northern Kentucky (pen.)	1 (4)

Final; Saturday, Nov. 4
1	Milwaukee	1
3	Northern Kentucky	0

== Schedule ==
=== Quarterfinals ===
October 29	#3 Northern Kentucky	1–0	#6 Detroit Mercy	Highland Heights, KY
1:00 p.m. ET	Megan Molner 76'	Report	(yellow card) 41' Megan Malek	Stadium: NKU Soccer Stadium; Attendance: 432; Referee: Heber Estrade; Assistant referees: Sean West; Brian Alvarez; Fourth official: Dean Morgan

October 29	#4 Robert Morris	4–1	#5 Wright State	Moon Township, PA
1:00 p.m. ET	Shauna Gamble 21'; Haleigh Finale 39'; Paloma Swankler 50'; Cali Laymon (yellow card) 57'; Kaoru Hayashi 68', (yellow card) 90'	Report	29' Kaylin Helinski; (yellow card) 87' Marcella Sizer	Stadium: North Athletic Complex; Attendance: 324; Referee: Sorin Stoica; Assistant referees: Jeffrey Mellen; Saki Atsas; Fourth official: John Safar

=== Semifinals ===
November 2	#1 Milwaukee	5–0	#4 Robert Morris	Milwaukee, WI
1:00 p.m. CT	Emma Famulak 37'; Kayla Rollins 54'; Brooke Parnello 62'; Molly O'Regan 77', 85'	Report		Stadium: Engelmann Field; Attendance: 382; Referee: Art Arustanyan; Assistant referees: Besnik Rexhepi; Joseluis Garcia; Fourth official: Alex Hofstetter

November 2	#2 IUPUI	1–1 (a.e.t.) (3-4 p)	#3 Northern Kentucky	Milwaukee, WI
4:00 p.m. CT	Natalie Newman 63'	Report	Sarah Henson 87'	Stadium: Engelmann Field; Attendance: 414; Referee: Christopher Koloffan; Assistant referees: Michael Koziera; Nikola Stancevic; Fourth official: Alex Hofstetter
	Penalties
	Leah Shumate (penalty missed); Emily Tobin (penalty scored); Carolina Kelley (penalty scored); Carlie Werner (penalty scored); Sam Slimak (penalty missed)		(penalty scored) Lydia Self; (penalty scored) Lilly Yordy; (penalty scored) Sofia Wilmes; (penalty scored) Kylie Anderson; (penalty missed) Kaya Vogt

=== Final ===
November 4	#1 Milwaukee	1–0	#3 Northern Kentucky	Milwaukee, WI
1:00 p.m. CT	Brooke Parnello 81' (pen.)			Stadium: Engelmann Field; Attendance: 515; Referee: Eulogio Villalpando; Assistant referees: Ryan Shanklin; Brian McKay; Fourth official: Joseluis Garcia

== Statistics ==
=== Goalscorers ===
There were 14 goals scored in 5 matches, for an average of 2.8 goals per match.

2 goals

- Molly O'Regan – Milwaukee
- Brooke Parnello – Milwaukee

1 goal

- Emma Famulak – Milwaukee
- Haleigh Finale – Robert Morris
- Shauna Gamble – Robert Morris
- Kaoru Hayashi – Robert Morris
- Kaylin Helinski – Wright State
- Sarah Henson – Northern Kentucky
- Megan Malek – Detroit Mercy
- Megan Molner – Northern Kentucky
- Natalie Newman – IUPUI
- Kayla Rollins – Milwaukee
- Paloma Swank – Robert Morris

== All-Tournament team ==
Player	Team
**Brooke Parnello**	Milwaukee
Clara Broecker	Milwaukee
Kendall Edwards	Milwaukee
Lainey Higgins	Milwaukee
Mickayla Kowalski	Northern Kentucky
Lydia Self	Northern Kentucky
Kaya Vogt	Northern Kentucky
Sarah Henson	IUPUI
Sam Slimak	IUPUI
Kaoru Hayashi	Robert Morris
Kristi Kania	Robert Morris

MVP in bold
