= 2019 Horizon League women's soccer tournament =

- Classification: Division I
- Teams: 6
- Matches: 5
- Attendance: 1,321
- Site: Engelmann Field; Milwaukee, Wisconsin (Semifinals & Final)
- Champions: Milwaukee (12th title)
- Winning coach: Troy Fabiano (2nd title)
- MVP: Haley Johnson (Milwaukee)
- Broadcast: ESPN+

2019 Horizon League women's soccer standings
	Conf.						Overall
Team	W		L		T	PCT	W		L		T	PCT
Milwaukee ‍†‍‡‍^{y}	8	–	0	–	1	.944	17	–	2	–	1	.875
UIC ‍‍‍	7	–	2	–	0	.778	12	–	6	–	1	.658
IUPUI ‍‍‍	6	–	3	–	0	.667	12	–	7	–	1	.625
Wright State ‍‍‍	5	–	4	–	0	.556	10	–	6	–	2	.611
Northern Kentucky ‍‍‍	5	–	4	–	0	.556	8	–	9	–	0	.471
Oakland ‍‍‍	4	–	3	–	2	.556	6	–	8	–	3	.441
Cleveland State ‍‍‍	4	–	4	–	1	.500	6	–	8	–	3	.441
Youngstown State ‍‍‍	4	–	4	–	1	.500	6	–	8	–	3	.441
Green Bay ‍‍‍	1	–	7	–	1	.167	7	–	10	–	1	.417
Detroit Mercy ‍‍‍	0	–	8	–	1	.056	2	–	13	–	2	.176
† – Conference champion ‡ – 2019 Horizon League Tournament champion y – Invited to the NCAA tournament As of December 9, 2019; Rankings from United Soccer Coaches Poll; Source:Horizon League

The 2019 Horizon League women's soccer tournament was the postseason women's soccer tournament for the Horizon League. It was held from November 4 through November 9, 2018. The quarterfinals of the tournament were held at campus sites, while semifinals and final took place at Engelmann Field in Milwaukee, Wisconsin. The six team single-elimination tournament consisted of three rounds based on seeding from regular season conference play. The Milwaukee Panthers were the defending champions, and they successfully defended their title by beating the UIC Flames 2–0 in the final. This was the twelfth overall title for Milwaukee and second for head coach Troy Fabiano.

== Bracket ==
Semifinal matchups were determined by the results of the quarterfinals. The #1 seed would play the lowest-remaining seed, while the #2 seed would play the other quarterfinal winner.

Quarterfinals; Monday, Nov. 4
4	Wright State	1
5	Northern Kentucky	3
3	IUPUI	0
6	Oakland	2

Semifinals; Thursday, Nov. 7
2	UIC	1^{2OT}
5	Northern Kentucky	0
1	Milwaukee	2
6	Oakland	1

Final; Saturday, Nov. 9
2	UIC	0
1	Milwaukee	2

== Schedule ==
=== Quarterfinals ===
November 4, 2019	#4 Wright State	1–3	#5 Northern Kentucky	Dayton, Ohio
7:00 p.m. EST	(yellow card) 30' Alysha Harmer; Sydni Callahan 71'	Report	22', (yellow card) 59' Lindsey Meyer; 40', 86' Shawna Zaken; (yellow card) 62' Ally Perkins	Stadium: Alumni Field; Attendance: 387; Referee: Brian Miller; Assistant referees: Ryan Slack; Tim Dicken; Fourth official: Sorin Stoica

November 4, 2019	#3 IUPUI	0–2	#6 Oakland	Indianapolis, Indiana
7:00 p.m. EST		Report	49' Sami Lopez; (yellow card) 56' Fotini Demetriou; 70' Nikki May	Stadium: IU Michael A. Carroll Track & Soccer Stadium; Attendance: 152; Referee: Jorge Cuate; Assistant referees: Eulogio Villalpando; Edmundo Ramirez; Fourth official: Sergio Alvarez

=== Semifinals ===
November 7, 2019	#2 UIC	1–0 (a.e.t.)	#5 Northern Kentucky	Milwaukee, Wisconsin
4:00 p.m. CT	Cassidy Privett 103'	Report	(yellow card) 63' Ashleigh Cronin	Stadium: Engelmann Field; Attendance: 113; Referee: Michael Kennedy; Assistant referees: Jordan Castillejo; Zachary Richter; Fourth official: Besnik Rexhepi

November 7, 2019	#1 Milwaukee	2–1	#6 Oakland	Milwaukee, Wisconsin
7:20 p.m. CT	Mackenzie Schill 22'; Haley Johnson 62'	Report	74' Alexa Sabbagh	Stadium: Engelmann Field; Attendance: 213; Referee: Art Arustamyan; Assistant referees: Tim Csuri; Khalef Al-Latayfeh; Fourth official: Besnik Rexhepi

=== Final ===
November 9, 2019	#1 Milwaukee	2–0	#2 UIC	Milwaukee, Wisconsin
6:00 p.m. CT	Rachel Phillpotts 8'; Haley Johnson 70'	Report	(yellow card) 6' Team; (yellow card) 7' Emily Valentine; (yellow card) 45' Megan Bowman	Stadium: Engelmann Field; Attendance: 456; Referee: Sorin Stocia; Assistant referees: Jeffrey Mellen; John Safar; Fourth official: Kyle Hannon

== Statistics ==
=== Goalscorers ===
2 Goals

- Haley Johnson (Milwaukee)
- Shawna Zaken (Northern Kentucky)

1 Goal

- Sydni Callahan (Wright State)
- Sami Lopez (Oakland)
- Nikki May (Oakland)
- Lindsey Meyer (Northern Kentucky)
- Rachel Phillpotts (Milwaukee)
- Cassidy Privett (UIC)
- Alexa Sabbagh (Oakland)
- Mackenzie Schill (Milwaukee)

== All-Tournament team ==
Player	Team
**Haley Johnson**	Milwaukee
McKaela Schmelzer	Milwaukee
Mackenzie Schill	Milwaukee
Elaina LaMacchia	Milwaukee
Cassidy Privett	UIC
Tamae Douglass	UIC
Lena Kurz	UIC
Kailey Ivins	Northern Kentucky
Shawna Zaken	Northern Kentucky
Nikki May	Oakland
Sami Lopez	Oakland

MVP in bold
