= 2016 Horizon League women's soccer tournament =

- Classification: Division I
- Teams: 6
- Matches: 5
- Site: Engelmann Stadium; Milwaukee, Wisconsin (semifinals & Final)
- Champions: Northern Kentucky (1st title)
- Winning coach: Bob Sheehan (1st title)

2016 Horizon League women's soccer standings
	Conf.						Overall
Team	W		L		T	PCT	W		L		T	PCT
Milwaukee ‍†‍‍	8	–	1	–	0	.889	13	–	5	–	2	.700
Detroit ‍‍‍	6	–	1	–	2	.778	10	–	7	–	2	.579
Northern Kentucky ‍‍‡‍^{y}	6	–	2	–	1	.722	13	–	7	–	1	.643
Oakland ‍‍‍	5	–	4	–	0	.556	9	–	10	–	1	.475
Valparaiso ‍‍‍	5	–	4	–	0	.556	9	–	10	–	0	.474
Wright State ‍‍‍	4	–	4	–	1	.500	6	–	11	–	2	.368
UIC ‍‍‍	4	–	5	–	0	.444	6	–	10	–	2	.389
Cleveland State ‍‍‍	2	–	7	–	0	.222	5	–	11	–	0	.313
Youngstown State ‍‍‍	1	–	7	–	1	.167	3	–	12	–	2	.235
Green Bay ‍‍‍	1	–	7	–	1	.167	1	–	13	–	2	.125
† – Conference champion ‡ – 2016 Horizon League Tournament champion y – Invited to the NCAA tournament As of 2016-11-17; Rankings from NSCAA

The 2016 Horizon League women's soccer tournament is the postseason women's soccer tournament for the Horizon League. It was held from October 31 to November 5, 2016. The five match tournament was held at campus sites, with the semifinals and final held at Engelmann Stadium in Milwaukee, Wisconsin. The six team single-elimination tournament consisted of three rounds based on seeding from regular season conference play. The Oakland Golden Grizzlies were the defending tournament champions after defeating the Wright State Raiders in the championship match.

== Bracket ==
First round Monday, Oct. 31
3	Northern Kentucky	1
6	Wright State	0
4	Oakland	3
5	Valparaiso	2

Semifinals; Thursday, Nov. 3
2	Detroit Mercy	2
3	Northern Kentucky	3
1	Milwaukee	1
4	Oakland	0

Final; Saturday, Nov. 5
3	Northern Kentucky	3
1	Milwaukee	2

== Schedule ==
=== First round ===
October 31, 2016	#3 Northern Kentucky	1–0	#6 Wright State	Highland Heights, Kentucky
7:00 p.m. EST	Jessica Frey 56'	Report		Stadium: NKU Soccer Stadium; Referee: Chico Grajeda

October 31, 2016	#4 Oakland	3–2	#5 Valparaiso	Rochester, Michigan
7:00 p.m. EST	Sydney Duggan 67'; Sierra Grodsinsky 83'; Brooke Miura 87'	Report	Maria Broecker 43', 49'	Stadium: Oakland Soccer Field

=== Semifinals ===
November 3, 2016	#2 Detroit Mercy	2–3	#3 Northern Kentucky	Milwaukee, Wisconsin
4:00 p.m. EST	Anna Mindling 12'; Suzie Redick 55'	Report	Jessica Frey 60'; Shawna Zaken 62'; Ally Perkins 83'	Stadium: Engelmann Stadium; Referee: Alex Beehler

November 3, 2016	#1 Milwaukee	1–0	#4 Oakland	Milwaukee, Wisconsin
7:00 p.m. EST	Anna Smalley 85'	Report		Stadium: Engelmann Stadium; Referee: Brandon Artis

=== Final ===
November 5, 2016	#1 Milwaukee	2–3	#3 Northern Kentucky	Milwaukee, Wisconsin
7:00 p.m. EST	McKaela Schmelzer 12'; Anna Smalley 17'	Report	Macy Hamblin 43'; Jessica Frey 56'; Shawna Zaken 88'	Stadium: Engelmann Stadium; Referee: Nikola Aleksic
