= 2018 Horizon League women's soccer tournament =

- Classification: Division I
- Teams: 6
- Matches: 5
- Attendance: 1,439
- Site: Engelmann Field; Milwaukee, Wisconsin (Semifinals & Final)
- Champions: Milwaukee (11th title)
- Winning coach: Troy Fabiano (1st title)
- MVP: Kelli Swenson (Milwaukee)
- Broadcast: ESPN+

2018 Horizon League women's soccer standings
	Conf.						Overall
Team	W		L		T	PCT	W		L		T	PCT
Milwaukee ‍†‍‡‍^{y}	9	–	0	–	0	1.000	16	–	2	–	1	.868
Cleveland State ‍‍‍	6	–	2	–	1	.722	11	–	7	–	1	.605
Northern Kentucky ‍‍‍	6	–	2	–	1	.722	10	–	6	–	1	.618
Wright State ‍‍‍	5	–	3	–	1	.611	6	–	9	–	2	.412
Detroit Mercy ‍‍‍	4	–	4	–	1	.500	9	–	8	–	3	.525
Oakland ‍‍‍	3	–	3	–	3	.500	4	–	11	–	4	.316
IUPUI ‍‍‍	3	–	5	–	1	.389	6	–	10	–	3	.395
UIC ‍‍‍	3	–	6	–	0	.333	4	–	14	–	1	.237
Youngstown State ‍‍‍	0	–	7	–	2	.111	1	–	13	–	4	.167
Green Bay ‍‍‍	0	–	7	–	2	.111	2	–	13	–	2	.176
† – Conference champion ‡ – 2018 Horizon League Tournament champion y – Invited to the NCAA tournament As of November 14, 2018; Rankings from United Soccer Coaches Poll; Source:Horizon League

The 2018 Horizon League women's soccer tournament was the postseason women's soccer tournament for the Horizon League. It was held from October 29 through November 3, 2018. The quarterfinals of the tournament were held at campus sites, while semifinals and final took place at Engelmann Field in Milwaukee, Wisconsin. The six team single-elimination tournament consisted of three rounds based on seeding from regular season conference play. The IUPUI Jaguars were the defending champions, but they did not qualify for the 2018 tournament after finishing the regular season in seventh place. The Milwaukee Panthers won the tournament by beating the Cleveland State Vikings 1–0 in the final.

== Bracket ==
Semifinal matchups were determined by the results of the quarterfinals. The #1 seed would play the lowest-remaining seed, while the #2 seed would play the other quarterfinal winner.

Quarterfinals; Monday, Oct. 29
4	Wright State	0
5	Detroit Mercy	2
3	Northern Kentucky	1
6	Oakland	2

Semifinals; Thursday, Nov. 1
2	Cleveland State	2
5	Detroit Mercy	1
1	Milwaukee	1 (4)
6	Oakland	1 (2)

Final; Saturday, Nov. 3
2	Cleveland State	0
1	Milwaukee	1

== Schedule ==
=== Quarterfinals ===
October 29, 2018	#4 Wright State	0–2	#5 Detroit Mercy	Dayton, Ohio
7:00 p.m. EDT		Report	Hannah Alexis (yellow card) 66'; Kelli Doyle 68'; Julie Ann Piechocki 70'	Stadium: Alumni Field; Attendance: 322; Referee: Heber Estrada; Assistant referees: Brian Apswich; Ethan Buege; Fourth official: Olu Afuwape

October 29, 2018	#3 Northern Kentucky	1–2	#6 Oakland	Highland Heights, Kentucky
7:00 p.m. EDT	Kailey Ivins 3'	Report	Sierra Grodsinsky (yellow card) 32'; Alexa Sabbagh 65'; Sydnye Gagner 77'	Stadium: NKU Soccer Stadium; Attendance: 187; Referee: Christopher Koloffon; Assistant referees: Art Atustamyan; Michael Kinder; Fourth official: Jose Ortiz

=== Semifinals ===
November 1, 2018	#2 Cleveland State	2–1	#5 Detroit Mercy	Milwaukee, Wisconsin
4:00 p.m. CDT	Team 20'; Jenna Prathapa 39'	Report	Caitlin Carroll 53'	Stadium: Engelmann Field; Attendance: 111; Referee: Eulogio Villalpando; Assistant referees: Tim Csuri; Katie Bates; Fourth official: Jen Mayfield

November 1, 2018	#1 Milwaukee	1–1 (a.e.t.) (4–2 p)	#6 Oakland	Milwaukee, Wisconsin
7:00 p.m. CDT	Rafferty Kugler 64'	Report	Lauren Bos 59'; Emma Voelker (yellow card) 76'	Stadium: Engelmann Field; Attendance: 256; Referee: Dimitrios Katsmingos; Assistant referees: Calin Radosav; Boris Bukovic; Fourth official: Arlind Kociu
	Penalties
	Jelena Sever (penalty scored); Gaby Schwartz (penalty scored); Marissa Stovring (penalty scored); Chandler McDaniel (penalty scored)		Sydnye Gagner (penalty scored); Ali Amante (penalty missed); Fotini Demetriou (penalty missed); Taylor Thalheimer (penalty scored)

=== Final ===
November 3, 2018	#2 Cleveland State	0–1	#1 Milwaukee	Milwaukee, Wisconsin
6:00 p.m. CDT	Stacie Morris (yellow card) 37'; Briana Niedermeier (yellow card) 42'	Report	McKaela Schmelzer (yellow card) 42'; Keli Swenson 56'	Stadium: Engelmann Field; Attendance: 563; Referee: Brian Miller; Assistant referees: Tim Dicken; Zachary Richter; Fourth official: Gracie Baker

== Statistics ==
=== Goalscorers ===
1 Goal

- Lauren Bos - Oakland
- Caitlin Carroll - Detroit Mercy
- Kelli Doyle - Detroit Mercy
- Sydnye Gagner - Oakland
- Kailey Ivins - Northern Kentucky
- Rafferty Kugle - Milwaukee
- Julie Ann Piechocki - Detroit Mercy
- Jenna Prathapa - Cleveland State
- Alexa Sabbagh - Oakland
- Keli Swenson - Milwaukee
- Cleveland State (team)

== All-Tournament team ==
Player	Team
Kelli Swenson	Milwaukee (MVP)
Erin Corrigan	Milwaukee
McKaela Schmelzer	Milwaukee
Elaina LaMacchia	Milwaukee
Stacy Morris	Cleveland State
Essence Canady	Cleveland State
Sarah Krause	Cleveland State
Carly Fiorido	Detroit Mercy
Casey Courtiuier	Detroit Mercy
Lauren Bos	Oakland
Kendra Zak	Oakland

== See also ==
- 2018 Horizon League Men's Soccer Tournament
