= Milwaukee Panthers women's soccer =

American college soccer team

- Founded: 1984; 42 years ago
- University: University of Wisconsin–Milwaukee
- Head coach: Kevin Boyd (4th season)
- Conference: Horizon League
- Location: Milwaukee, Wisconsin, US
- Stadium: Engelmann Stadium (capacity: 2,200)
- Nickname: Panthers
- Colors: Black and gold
| Home | Away |

NCAA tournament Round of 32
- 1997, 2005, 2006, 2011, 2020, 2021

NCAA tournament appearances
- 1997, 2001, 2002, 2005, 2006, 2008, 2009, 2010, 2011, 2012, 2013, 2018, 2019, 2020, 2021, 2022, 2023, 2024, 2025, 2026

Conference tournament championships
- 1997, 2001, 2002, 2005, 2008, 2009, 2010, 2011, 2012, 2013, 2018, 2019, 2020, 2021, 2022, 2023, 2024, 2025, 2026

The Milwaukee Panthers women's soccer team represents University of Wisconsin–Milwaukee in NCAA Division I college soccer. Milwaukee competes in the Horizon League. The Panthers are led by head coach Kevin Boyd.

== History ==
Milwaukee made their first NCAA tournament appearance in 1997 after a 13-3-4 season, winning the MCC tournament in penalties over Butler and losing 2-1 to Minnesota in the round of 32.

In 2001, the Panthers won the Horizon League tournament 1-0 over Butler. At the 2001 NCAA tournament, Milwaukee lost 1-0 in 2OT to Dartmouth in the first round of the 64 team tournament.

In 2002, Milwaukee won back to back Horizon League titles in a 4-2 win over Butler. In the 2002 NCAA tournament, the Panthers lost 2-0 to Pepperdine.

In 2005, the Panthers won the Horizon League tournament in penalties over Detroit Mercy. In the 2005 NCAA tournament, they defeated Purdue in penalties for their first-ever tournament win. In the Round of 32, they lost 1-0 to Marquette.

In 2006, Milwaukee earned an at-large bid to the NCAA tournament after a 16-4-2 regular season and undefeated 7-0-0 in Horizon League play. They lost the 2006 tournament final 1-0 to Detroit Mercy. In the NCAA tournament, they defeated Michigan in penalties to advance to the Round of 32. In the Round of 32, they lost 1-0 to Notre Dame.

In 2008, the Panthers defeated Loyola to win the Horizon League title and automatic bid. In the NCAA tournament, they lost in the first round to Michigan State 2-1. The 2008 season marked the first year in a streak of 6 straight NCAA tournament appearances from 2008 to 2013. 2009 and 2010 were first round NCAA tournament exits. In 2011, Milwaukee made the Round of 32 after defeating Illinois State 3-0. 2012 and 2013 were both first round NCAA tournament exits.

In 2018, Milwaukee began another dynasty in the Horizon League, winning the 2018, 2019, 2020, 2021, 2022, 2023, 2024, and 2025 conference titles. In 2020, they defeated Elon in the NCAA tournament to advance to the Round of 32 for the first time in 9 years. In 2021, they defeated Xavier in the first round to advance to the Round of 32.

In 2025, the Panthers won their eighth consecutive Horizon League championship after defeating Green Bay 4-0. In the 2025 NCAA tournament, Milwaukee lost to Michigan State 4-1 in the first round.

== Current squad ==
As of November 2026

Note: Flags indicate national team as defined under FIFA eligibility rules; some limited exceptions apply. Players may hold more than one non-FIFA nationality.

| No. | Pos. | Nation | Player |
|---|---|---|---|
| 0 | GK | NED | Julia Esperanza de Ritter |
| 1 | GK | USA | Lauren Nidey |
| 2 | DF | USA | Payton Green |
| 3 | DF | USA | Abby O'Brien |
| 4 | DF | USA | Brinlee McNabb |
| 5 | DF | USA | Olivia Bohl |
| 6 | DF | USA | Kiersten White |
| 7 | FW | USA | Addison Werth |
| 8 | MF | USA | Denise Camarena |
| 9 | MF | USA | Maya Wilson |
| 11 | FW | USA | Ashlyn Skinner-Barrett |
| 12 | FW | USA | Emily Petring |
| 14 | MF | USA | Natalie Zodrow |

| No. | Pos. | Nation | Player |
|---|---|---|---|
| 16 | FW | USA | Leah Brock |
| 17 | MF | USA | Dylan Beede |
| 19 | MF | USA | Ashlyn Derosier |
| 20 | DF | USA | Kennedy Floyd |
| 23 | FW | USA | Taylor Richards |
| 24 | DF | USA | Cassidy Pettijohn |
| 25 | DF | IRL | Sadbh Griffin |
| 26 | DF | USA | Emily Urban |
| 27 | MF | USA | Josslyn Farrare |
| 28 | FW | USA | Keani Martinez |
| 29 | FW | USA | Braelyn Hundt |
| 30 | DF | USA | Maya Allen |
| 33 | GK | USA | Jaylah Moore |
