= Milwaukee Cup =

College soccer trophy

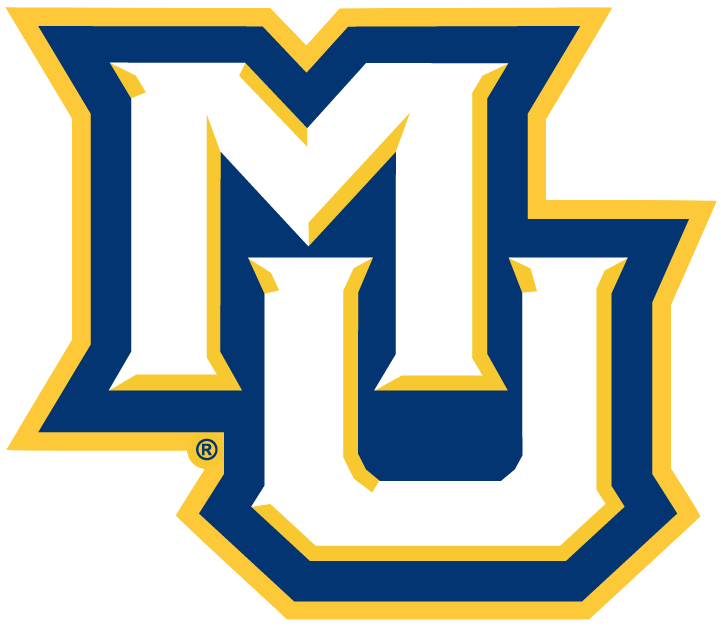
- Marquette Golden Eagles Milwaukee Panthers
- Sport: College soccer
- First meeting: September 23, 1973; Milwaukee 4, Marquette 1
- Latest meeting: September 22, 2026; Marquette 1, Milwaukee 0
- Next meeting: TBD
- Stadiums: Engelmann Stadium (Milwaukee); Valley Fields (Marquette)
- Trophy: Milwaukee Cup

Statistics
- Total meetings: 52
- All-time series: Milwaukee, 31–14–7
- Largest victory: Milwaukee 9, Marquette 0 (1977)
- Longest win streak: 9, Milwaukee (1973–1981)
- Longest unbeaten streak: 9, Milwaukee (1973–1981)
- Current win streak: Marquette, 2
- Current unbeaten streak: Marquette, 5
- The two sides' home grounds, Valley Fields and Engelmann Stadium, stand only four miles (6.5 kilometers) apart

The Milwaukee Cup is a traveling trophy awarded to the winner of the annual men's soccer match between the Marquette Golden Eagles and the Milwaukee Panthers. The two universities are both in the city of Milwaukee and are just four miles apart.

Milwaukee leads the all-time series, 31–13–7, since the first meeting in 1973. Marquette currently holds the cup after a 1-0 victory at Valley Fields September 22, 2026. In the event of a draw, the cup remains in possession of the school holding it previously.

Cup matches between 2006-23 took on a heightened sense of rivalry due to Louis Bennett accepting the head coaching position at Marquette after 10 years as head coach at Milwaukee. Bennett retired from Marquette's program after the 2023 season.

The cup match stands as one of the few examples of a true derby in American soccer.

== Match results ==
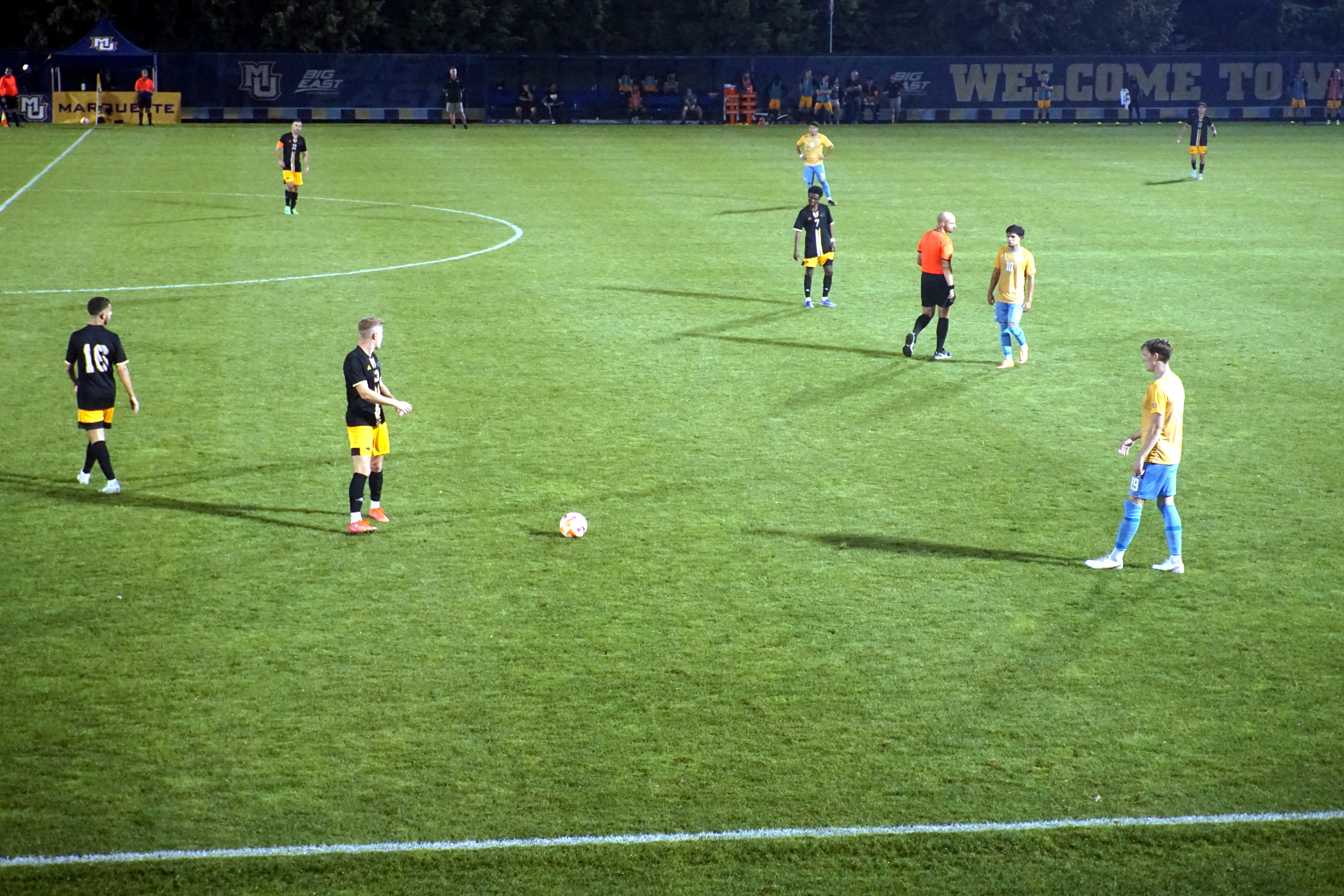
The 2022 Milwaukee Cup, won 5–2 by Marquette

Year	Winner	Score	Location
2026	Marquette	1-0	Valley Fields
2025	Marquette	3-2	Engelmann Stadium
2024	Draw	1–1	Valley Fields
2023	Draw	1–1	Engelmann Stadium
2022	Marquette	5–2	Valley Fields
2021	No match		
2020-21	No match		
2019	Milwaukee	2–1	Engelmann Stadium
2018	Milwaukee	2–1	Valley Fields
2017	Milwaukee	2–0	Engelmann Stadium
2016	Draw	3–3 (2 OT)	Valley Fields
2015	Draw	1–1 (2 OT)	Engelmann Stadium
2014	Marquette	2–0	Valley Fields
2013	Milwaukee	2–1	Engelmann Stadium
2012	Marquette	3–2	Valley Fields
2011	Milwaukee	3–1	Engelmann Stadium
2010	Milwaukee	4–2	Valley Fields
2009	Marquette	1–0	Valley Fields
2008	Marquette	2–0	Engelmann Field
2007	Draw	1–1 (2 OT)	Valley Fields
2006	Milwaukee	3–2	Engelmann Field
2005	Milwaukee	4–0	Valley Fields
2004	Milwaukee	3–1	Engelmann Field
2003	Marquette	2–1	Valley Fields
2002	Milwaukee	2–0	Engelmann Field
2001	Milwaukee	2–1	Valley Fields
2000	Marquette	5–1	Engelmann Field
1999	Marquette	3–2 (OT)	Engelmann Field
1998	Marquette	1–0	Valley Fields
1997	Draw	0–0 (2 OT)	Valley Fields
1996	Milwaukee	2–1	Engelmann Field
1995	Milwaukee	2–1	Valley Fields
1994	Milwaukee	2–0	Engelmann Field
1993	Marquette	2–0	Valley Fields
1992	Milwaukee	2–0	Engelmann Field
1991	Milwaukee	2–1 (OT)	
1990	Milwaukee	3–1	
1989	Milwaukee	2–1	Engelmann Field
1988	Milwaukee	1–0	Engelmann Field
1987	Milwaukee	2–1 (OT)	
1986	Milwaukee	2–0	Engelmann Field
1985	Milwaukee	4–2 (OT)	
1984	Draw	0–0 (2 OT)	Bavarian Field
1983	Marquette	3–0	
1982	Marquette	3–0	
1981	Milwaukee	1–0	
1980	Milwaukee	5–1	Engelmann Field
1979	Milwaukee	1–0	
1978	Milwaukee	1–0	Engelmann Field
1977	Milwaukee	9–0	
1976	Milwaukee	2–0	Engelmann Field
1975	Milwaukee	2–0	Quincy, IL
1974	Milwaukee	2–1	
1973	Milwaukee	4–1	
Series	Milwaukee	31–14–7	52 matches
