= Engelmann Stadium =

Soccer stadium in Milwaukee, Wisconsin

Coordinates: 43.076884°N 87.885053°W

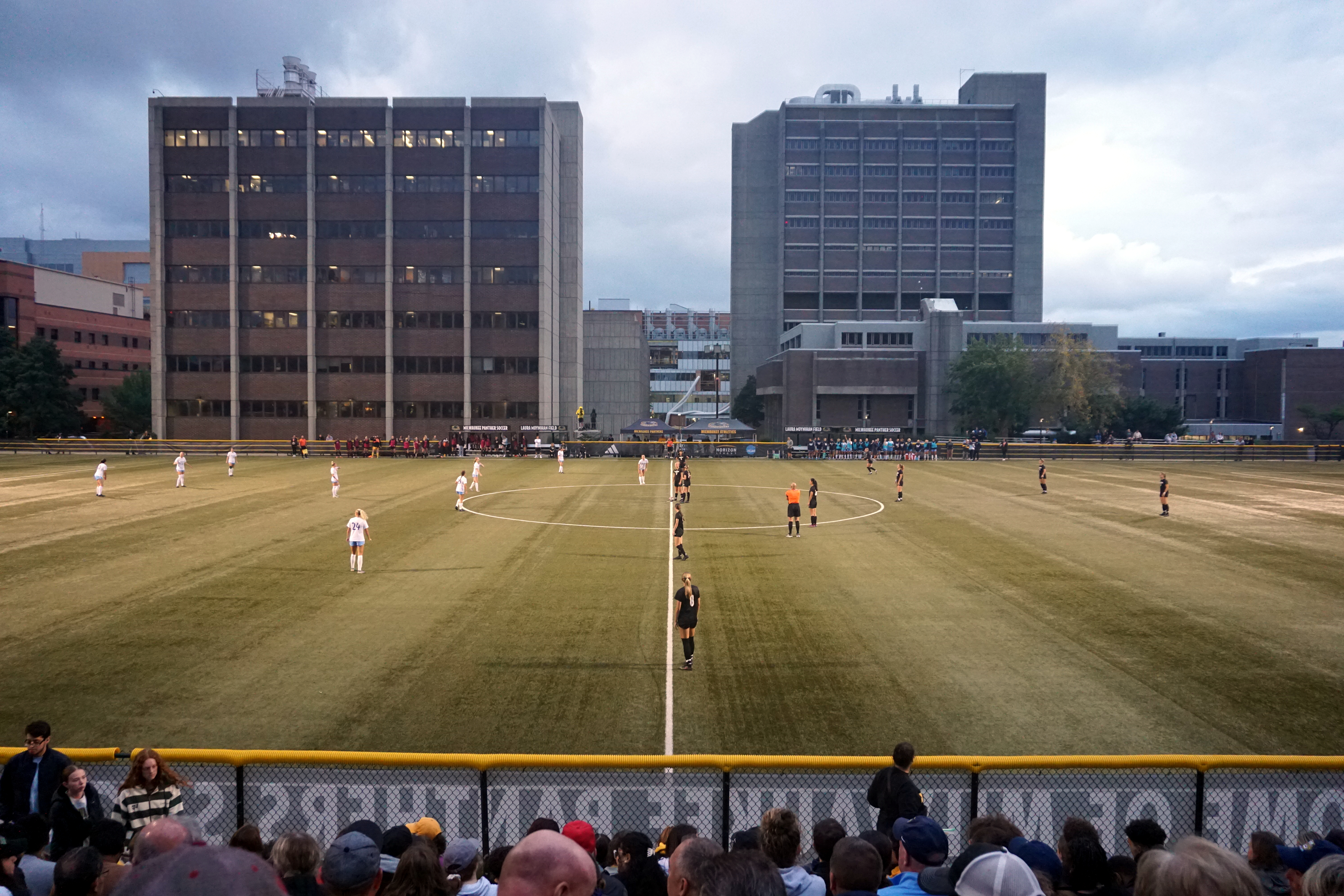
- View of the stadium during a match in 2023
- Interactive map of Engelmann Stadium
- Full name: Laura Moynihan Field at Engelmann Stadium
- Former names: Engelmann Field
- Address: Milwaukee, Wisconsin; United States
- Owner: University of Wisconsin–Milwaukee
- Operator: Milwaukee Panthers
- Capacity: 2,200
- Surface: Polytan artificial turf
- Scoreboard: Daktronics
- Record attendance: 4,030 (Milwaukee men vs. Marquette, September 3, 2015)

Construction
- Opened: 1973; 53 years ago
- Renovated: 2010, 2016

Tenants
- Milwaukee Panthers men's soccer (NCAA) (1973–present); Milwaukee Panthers women's soccer (NCAA) (1984–present)

Website
- mkepanthers.com/engelmann-stadium

Engelmann Stadium, officially Laura Moynihan Field at Engelmann Stadium, is a soccer-specific stadium on the campus of the University of Wisconsin–Milwaukee. It is home to the Milwaukee Panthers men's and women's soccer teams, both of which compete in the Horizon League of the NCAA's Division I.

== History ==
Built in 1973, the 2,200-capacity field is tucked between buildings in the middle of the campus. The stadium's lighting system was installed in 2006.

In 2010, the stadium underwent a renovation to remake the playing surface. Polytan artificial turf was installed, and the surface received a FIFA 2-Star quality rating, just the sixth in the CONCACAF region to do so. Women's soccer head coach Michael Moynihan and associate head coach David Nikolic raised money for the new surface, and in honor of Moynihan's mother, former head coach Laura Moynihan, the field was renamed Laura Moynihan Field and the stadium Engelmann Stadium was attached to the stadium overall.

=== Panther Invitational ===
Engelmann Stadium was home to the longest-running in-season tournament in NCAA Division I men's soccer, the Panther Invitational.

The 40th edition of the tournament was held in 2014, and for the first time was split between Engelmann Stadium and Valley Fields on the campus of Marquette University. However, the tournament has not been held since.

== See also ==
- Milwaukee Cup
