= Youngstown State Penguins =

Athletic teams of Youngstown State University

- University: Youngstown State University
- NCAA: Division I (FCS)
- Conference: Horizon League (primary); Missouri Valley Football Conference; CUSA (bowling); MAC (women's lacrosse)
- Athletic director: Ron Strollo
- Location: Youngstown, Ohio
- Varsity teams: 21
- Football stadium: Stambaugh Stadium
- Basketball arena: Beeghly Center
- Baseball stadium: Eastwood Field
- Nickname: Penguins
- Colors: Red, white, and black
- Mascot: Pete and Penny
- Fight song: Red and White
- Website: ysusports.com
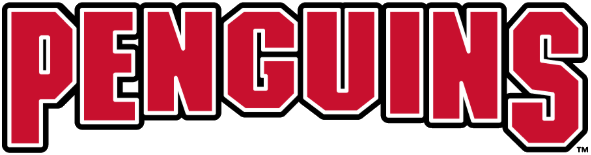

The Youngstown State Penguins are the athletic teams of Youngstown State University in Youngstown, Ohio. The university is a member of the National Collegiate Athletic Association's (NCAA) Division I, and the Penguins compete in football as members of the Missouri Valley Football Conference. Most other sports compete as members of the Horizon League.

== Nickname History ==
YSU is the only Division I program in the country to use Penguins as its athletic nickname. YSU's mascots are Pete and Penny, two penguins dressed in scarfs and stocking caps. There are two accounts of how the "Penguins" nickname came to be. Both stories come from the same cold evening on January 30, 1933, when the men's basketball team was playing at West Liberty State.

The first account is that a spectator said the team looked like Penguins as they stomped the floor and swung their arms. Without the team having an official nickname, fans took a liking to the word. A second account states that, on the way to West Liberty State with up to two feet of snow on the roads, passengers in Bennett Kunicki's car were discussing possible nicknames. "Penguins" was brought up and was well received by everyone in the car. The nickname was mentioned to members of the team at the gym that evening, and they thought it was perfect.

The nickname was unanimously accepted by the student body that year without a formal poll. The nickname was formally introduced in The Jambar, the campus newspaper, on December 15, 1933.

Informally, YSU is often called Guins for short as a rallying cry (e.g. "Go Guins!"), which is also used for hashtag purposes on its various social media accounts.

== Sponsored sports ==
A member of the Horizon League, Youngstown State University sponsors teams in nine men's and twelve women's NCAA sanctioned sports:

Men's sports	Women's sports
Baseball	Basketball
Basketball	Bowling
Cross country	Cross country
Football	Golf
Golf	Lacrosse
Swimming & diving	Soccer
Tennis	Softball
Track & field^{1}	Swimming & diving
	Tennis
	Track & field^{1}
	Volleyball
^{1} – includes both indoor and outdoor.

=== Football ===
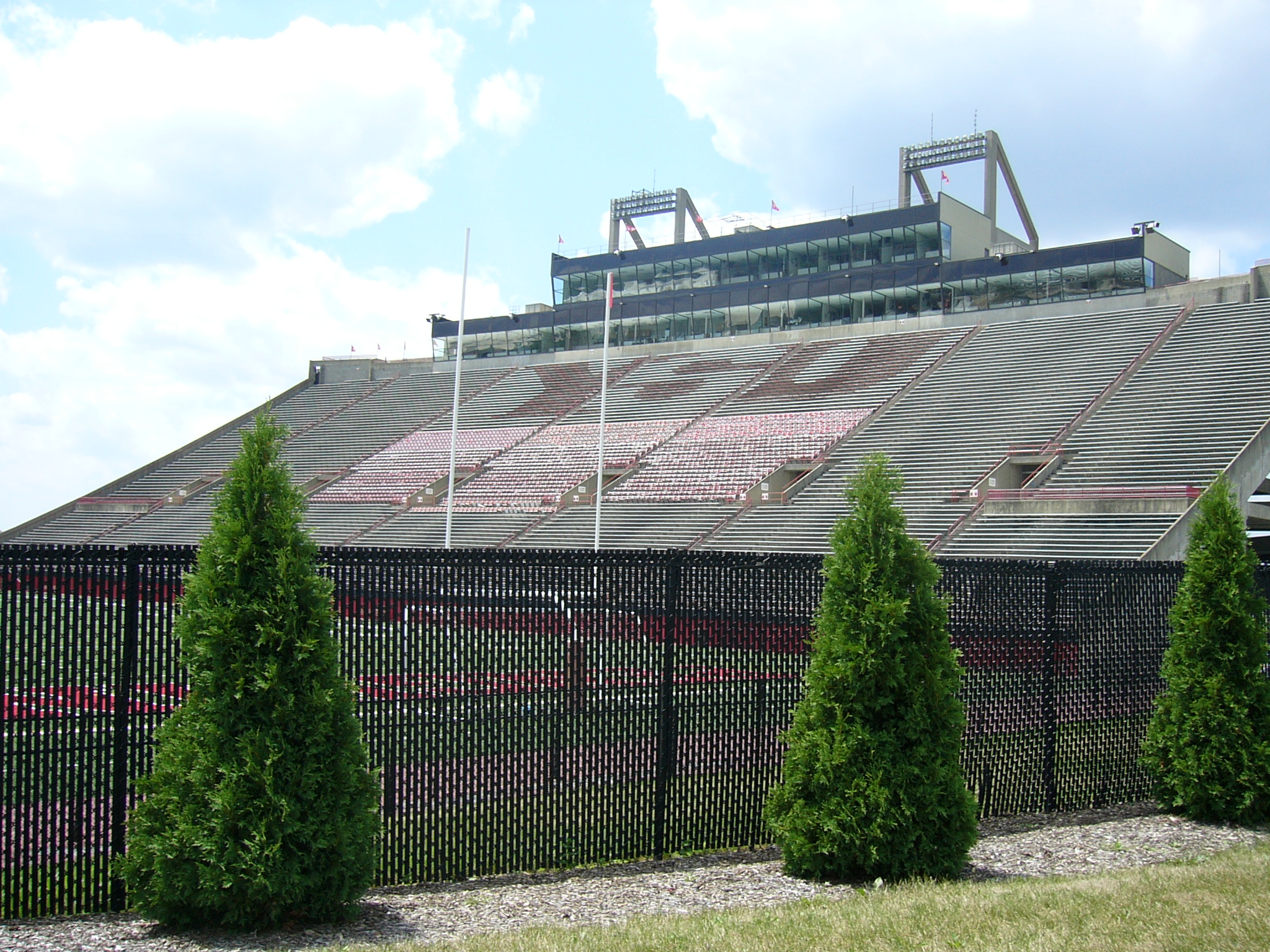
Stambaugh Stadium, football venue

YSU has been particularly successful in, and is most recognized for, football. The program started in the 1930s and is one of the leading programs in NCAA Division I Football Championship Subdivision (formerly known as Division I-AA), YSU has won four FCS national championships, third behind North Dakota State (7) and Georgia Southern (6), with all of them coming under former head coach Jim Tressel. Tressel, who left the university following the 2000 season to coach at Ohio State and later returned to YSU as president from 2014 to 2023, helped the Penguins claim titles in 1991, 1993, 1994 and 1997, as well as runner-up finishes in 1992 and 1999.

His successor, Jon Heacock, did not win a national championship, but still delivered consistent seasons and took them to a national semifinal appearance in 2006 (losing to eventual national champion Appalachian State) prior to resigning following the 2009 season. Eric Wolford, a Youngstown native who has been labeled a top recruiter at the NCAA Division I Football Bowl Subdivision level, was named the sixth head coach in school history on Dec. 15, 2009; a highlight of Wolford's second season was a 2011 victory over eventual National Champion North Dakota State. Youngstown native Bo Pelini was announced as the seventh head coach in school history on Dec. 16, 2014. Overall, YSU has made 14 playoff appearances since Division I FCS (then Division I-AA) was formed in 1978.

Historically, YSU is associated with longtime coach Dwight "Dike" Beede, who, after noticing on-field confusion due to officials using whistles to signal a penalty, invented the penalty flag during a game in 1941 against now-NAIA member Oklahoma City. The flag is now standard at all football games.

YSU plays its home games at Stambaugh Stadium, nicknamed "The Ice Castle", which has an official capacity of 20,630, one of the largest in Division I FCS. The Penguins have sent over 20 players to the NFL. Brandian Ross spent the 2014 season with the Oakland Raiders, and Donald Jones, who played three seasons with the Buffalo Bills, was forced to retire in 2013 due to non-football related health reasons. The most notable Youngstown State alumni to play in the NFL are Jeff Wilkins, Ron Jaworski, Paul McFadden, and Cliff Stoudt.

=== Men's basketball ===
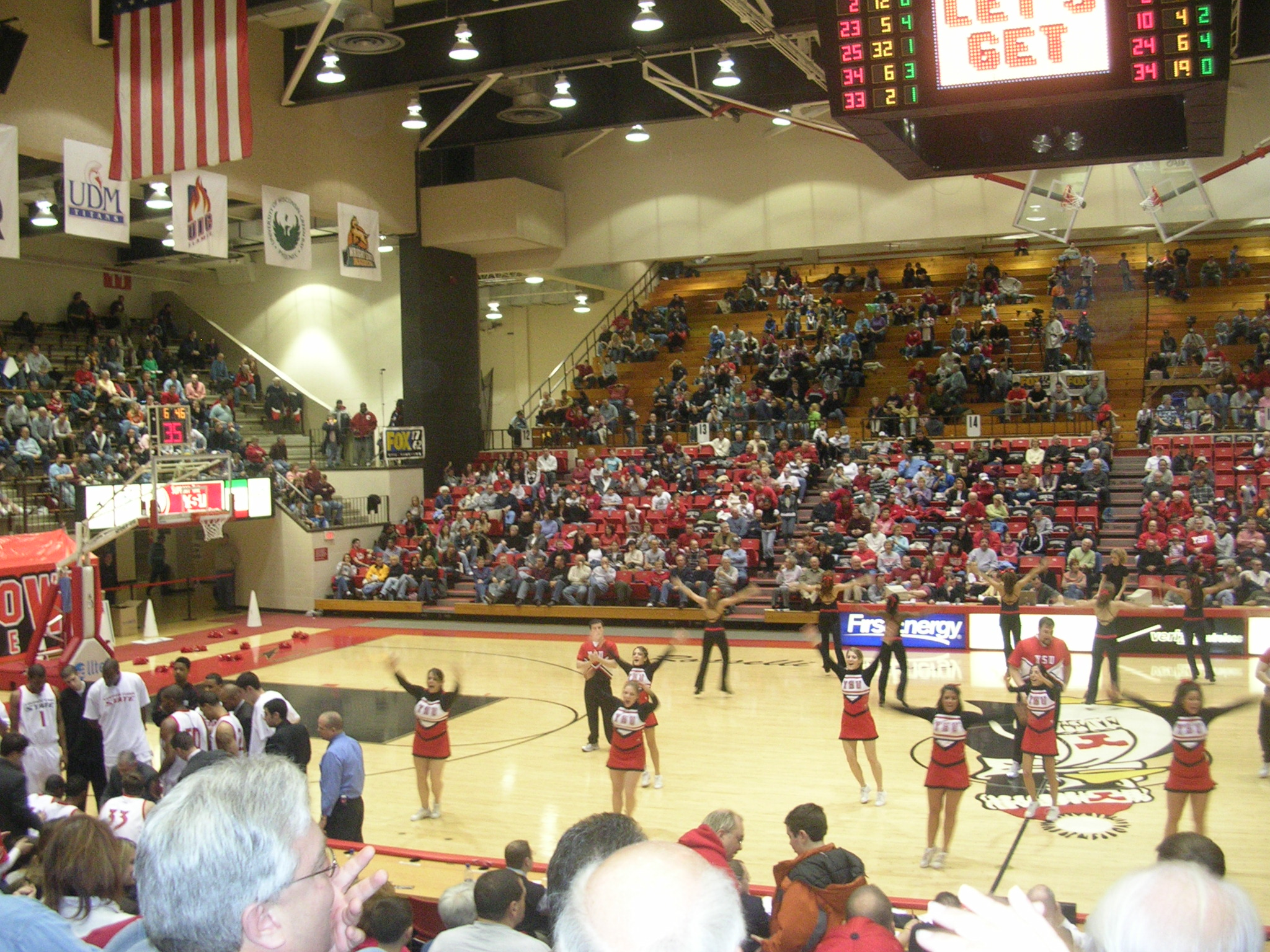
Beeghly Center, basketball arena

The Youngstown State men's basketball team began with the 1927–28 season. The team has competed in the NAIA from 1946–47 until joining NCAA Division II competition in 1960–61. The Penguins joined Division I competition in 1981–82, which was also the last season the team was coached by long-time coach Dom Rosselli. Over 38 seasons, Rosselli compiled a record of 589–388 (.603). Upon joining Division I competition, the Penguins competed in the Ohio Valley Conference until the 1988–89 season. After four seasons as an independent, the Penguins competed in the Mid-Continent Conference from 1992–93 until joining the Horizon League in the 2001–02 season. Although the team has competed in NCAA Division I and has been a member of three separate conferences, the men's basketball team has yet to win a conference championship in either the regular season or conference tournament.

Since joining the Horizon League in the 2001–02 season, the men's basketball team has won the regular season title once, in the 2022–23 season. The program had its first back-to-back winning seasons in 29 years in 2011–12 and 2012–13 and was invited to the 2013 CollegeInsider.com Postseason Tournament. The program was coached by Jerry Slocum for 12 seasons from 2005 to 2017 and concluded his coaching career with a 142–232 record. Overall, Slocum amassed 699 victories throughout his college coaching career. He is in a select group of college men's basketball coaches with 600 wins. Slocum was replaced by Jerrod Calhoun in 2017. In his first six years, Calhoun produced four winning seasons and a 96–96 record. Calhoun's success includes the Horizon League regular season championship and an invitation to compete in the National Invitation Tournament (NIT). Kendrick Perry, who played at Youngstown State from 2010–11 through 2013–14, played in the NBA Development League and now competes for Unicaja of the Spanish Liga ACB and the Basketball Champions League. Calhoun coached the program for seven years, producing five winning seasons and a 118–106 record. He left to take the head coach position at Utah State and was replaced by Ethan Faulkner. In his first season, Faulkner led the Penguins to the Horizon League Tournament final for the first time in program history.

=== Women's basketball ===
The Youngstown State women’s basketball team began competing as an official member of the athletic department in the 1975–76 season under Head Coach Joyce Ramsey. Ramsey coached the Penguins for seven seasons and retired with a .694 winning percentage (93–41), the best of the program’s seven coaches.

Ed DiGregorio was hired as head coach prior to the 1983–84 season and remained in the same position for 20 years. He led the Penguins to 320 wins, six 20-win seasons and three NCAA tournaments – in 1996, 1998 and 2000. The 1998 team finished with a 28–3 record and beat Memphis in the opening round of the NCAA tournament for the program’s first postseason victory.

Following the 1999–2000 season, the fifth consecutive season with at least 20 wins, Youngstown State went 12 straight seasons without a winning record. It was the only winless team in college basketball during the 2009–10 season. Behind Horizon League Coach of the Year Bob Boldon and Honorable Mention All-American Brandi Brown, YSU had a 23–10 record in 2013 and was selected to the 2013 WNIT. Current head coach John Barnes led the program back to the WNIT and a 21–11 record in 2014–15. In his first 10 years, Barnes has amassed a 170–130 record.

=== Other sports ===
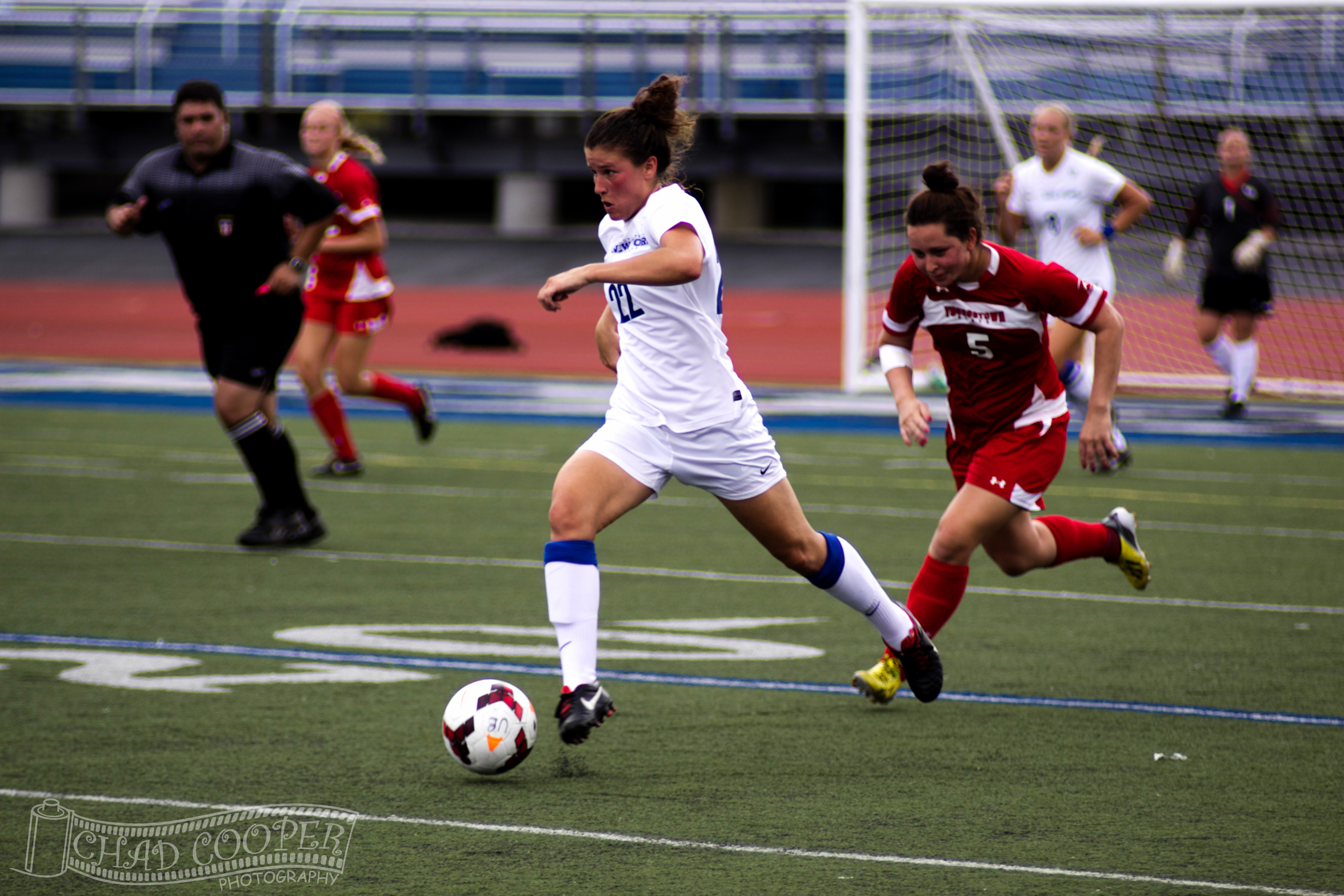
Youngstown State (in red) v Buffalo women's soccer match in 2013

The track and field and cross country teams are consistently strong contenders in the Horizon League. The women's team won the triple crown (cross country, indoor track and field, outdoor track and field) in both the 2013–14 and 2014-15 seasons. The 2015 Horizon League outdoor track and field championship was head coach Brian Gorby's 25th title.

Also notable are the baseball and softball teams. In 2004, despite having a losing record, the baseball team won the Horizon League tournament and went to the NCAA tournament for the first time. The baseball team repeated this feat in 2014 by winning four consecutive games in the Horizon League tournament after winning just six conference contests during the regular season. They went on to defeat the 2-seed at the Bloomington Regional, Indiana State, for their first NCAA tournament win in program history. In 2006, the softball team earned its first Horizon League championship by winning four consecutive games as the fifth seed in the conference tournament and qualified for the NCAA regional softball tournament.

The Youngstown State bowling team won the 2025 NCAA bowling championship on April 12, 2025. The Penguins added a women's bowling team in 2015–16. The team competed as an independent until joining the Southland Bowling League (SBL) in 2018. The team remained in the SBL until that league agreed to merge into Conference USA (CUSA) following the 2022–23 season. All of the final SBL members, including YSU, became CUSA associates.

In February 2019, the university announced the addition of women's lacrosse and return of men's swimming and diving. YSU previously competed in men's swimming and diving from 1949 through 1951 and 1964 through 1984. Women's lacrosse joined the Mid-American Conference as an affiliate member for the MAC's new women's lacrosse conference competition beginning in the 2021 season.

== Facilities ==
The Penguins' primary athletic facilities are Stambaugh Stadium (football) and the Beeghly Center (basketball, swimming, and volleyball). Indoor track and field events are held at the Watson and Tressel Training Site ("The WATTS") located next to Stambaugh Stadium, with outdoor track and field events and soccer matches being held at Farmers National Bank Field on the opposite side of Stambaugh Stadium. The Lady Penguins softball team competes at the YSU Softball Complex, with the baseball team hosting their games at the off-campus Eastwood Field.
