= Northern Kentucky Norse =

Athletic program of Northern Kentucky University

- University: Northern Kentucky University
- Conference: Horizon League
- NCAA: Division I
- Athletic director: Christina Roybal
- Location: Highland Heights, Kentucky
- Varsity teams: 23
- Basketball arena: Truist Arena
- Baseball stadium: Bill Aker Baseball Complex
- Softball stadium: Frank Ignatius Grein Softball Field
- Soccer stadium: Scudamore Field at NKU Soccer Stadium
- Mascot: Victor E. Viking
- Nickname: Norse
- Colors: Black, gold, and white
- Website: nkunorse.com

The Northern Kentucky Norse are the athletic teams of Northern Kentucky University, located in Highland Heights, Kentucky, United States. NKU is an NCAA Division I school competing in the Horizon League, which it joined on July 1, 2015, after leaving the Atlantic Sun Conference. The university's teams for both men and women are nicknamed "Norse."

== Nomenclature ==
Norse has been a common term for Norsemen in the early medieval period, especially in connection with raids and monastic plundering by Norsemen in the British Isles (i.e. Norse Vikings or Norwegians) (Gall Goidel, lit.: foreign Gaelic), was used concerning the people of Norse descent in Ireland and Scotland, who assimilated into the Gaelic culture. The Norse, or Northmen, were also known as Ascomanni, ashmen, by the Germans, Lochlanach (Norse) by the Irish and Dene (Danes) by the Anglo-Saxons.

== Division I transition ==
NKU began preparing to reclassify as an NCAA Division I institution in the fall of 2008, and officially started the process in the fall of 2012. During the four-year reclassification, NKU was not eligible for Division I championships. The university ended its membership in the Great Lakes Valley Conference (GLVC) at the conclusion of the 2011–12 academic year and began playing a full Atlantic Sun Conference schedule in fall 2012. Following the four years, NKU became a full Division I member. Prior to completing its transition to Division I, NKU changed its membership from the Atlantic Sun Conference to the Horizon League.

== Sports sponsored ==
A member of the Horizon League, NKU currently sponsors varsity teams in nine men's and 12 women's NCAA-sanctioned sports, plus one men's sport that operates outside of NCAA governance.

NKU has added six sports, three each for men and women, in the 2020s. Men's and women's swimming & diving, women's stunt, (Note: Stunt, an all-female cheerleading discipline that emphasizes acrobatics, does not have an NCAA-sanctioned championship, but the sport is recognized as part of the NCAA Emerging Sports for Women program. It is expected to become an official NCAA championship sport in 2026–27.) and men's and women's triathlon (Note: Women's triathlon does not have an NCAA-sanctioned championship, but is recognized as part of the Emerging Sports for Women program. Men's triathlon has no NCAA recognition at all.) were added in 2024–25, with men's volleyball following in 2025–26. Men's volleyball joined the single-sport Midwestern Intercollegiate Volleyball Association upon the program's launch.

Men's sports	Women's sports
Baseball	Basketball
Basketball	Cross country
Cross country	Golf
Golf	Soccer
Soccer	Softball
Swimming and diving	Stunt
Track and field^{1}	Swimming and diving
	Track and field^{1}
	Triathlon
	Volleyball
^{1} includes both indoor and outdoor

=== Men's basketball ===
The men's basketball team was the NCAA Division II national runner-up during the 1995–96 and 1996–97 seasons. The Norse won the Horizon League Tournament following the 2016–17 season, making them eligible for their first NCAA tournament appearance.

=== Women's basketball ===
In 2000, the NKU women's basketball team became NKU's first national championship team by winning the NCAA Division II Women's Basketball Championship in overtime 71–62 over North Dakota State, ending its season with a 32–2 record. The 2002–03 team was the NCAA Women's Division II national runner-up.

The team won its second national championship in 2008 by a score of 63–58 over South Dakota, becoming one of only five schools to win more than one NCAA Division II Women's Basketball Championship, as well as the only two-time NCAA national champions in the state of Kentucky. One of the top coaches in NCAA Division II women's basketball, Nancy Winstel, was head coach of the team from 1983 until her retirement at the end of the 2011–12 season. Dawn Plitzuweit, an assistant at Michigan, was named the new NKU Women's Basketball coach on May 10, 2012. On May 6, 2016, Camryn Whitaker was named as the new head coach.

=== Men's soccer ===
In 2010, the NKU men's soccer team won the NCAA Division II national championship by defeating Rollins 3–2 in a driving snowstorm in Louisville. The team was led by senior Steven Beattie, who was named Ron Lenz National Player of the Year in both 2008 and 2010.

=== Women's soccer ===
The women's soccer team was the NCAA Division II runner-up in 2000 and advanced to the NCAA Division II Final Four in 1999 and 2001.

=== Baseball ===
The Norse Baseball team as Division II team won Great Lakes conference valley championships between 2002 and 2009. As a Division I team, In 2024 they became the first Horizon League tournament champions in program's history as a baseball team and advanced to their first ever NCAA Division I Baseball Tournament.

=== Softball ===
The Norse softball began in 1985 and is currently coached by Morgan Gerak, the sixth coach in program history. Following former head coach Kathryn Gleason who is the losingest coach in NKU history. Gleason took the Norse to their first NCAA Tournament with a dismal record of 23–32 and being swept in the Tennessee Regionals. Gleason compiled a 207–262–1 (.440) record as her time as a head coach at UMass (74–74–1) and NKU (133–188) The team holds an overall record of 621–445–1 (.583).

=== Spirit squad ===
In 2006, the Norse cheerleading squad won the Universal Cheerleading Association's national title in the small unit coed category of competition, and also won the national title again in 2007 and 2009.

In 2011, The Norse Dance Team placed in the Universal Dance Association's national competition in the open hip hop category. The Northern Kentucky University (NKU) Norse Cheerleading program has won several national championships and achieved high rankings at the Universal Cheerleaders Association (UCA) National Collegiate Cheerleading Competition. Here is a summary of their national titles and notable finishes: Achievement Year(s) Category / Division UCA Small Coed Division II National Champions 2006, 2007, 2009, 2010 Small Coed Division II UCA Small Coed Division I Game Day National Champion 2021 Small Coed Division I Game Day and Traditional 3rd Place - UCA All-Girl Category 2016 (highest finish) Division I All-Girl 3rd Place - UCA Small Coed Division I Game Day 2023 Small Coed Division I Game Day 5th Place - UCA Small Coed 2013 (first time competing in Division I) Division I Small Coed The NKU Cheerleading team participates annually in the UCA National Collegiate Cheerleading Competition held at Walt Disney World in Orlando, Florida. They were planning to attend the 2026 competition as well. The team is actively involved in campus and community events, and fundraising efforts support their participation in national competitions and provide scholarships for their athletes.

Has NKU Cheerleading won any other awards? In addition to national championships, the Northern Kentucky University (NKU) Norse Cheerleading program has received other forms of recognition and awards, particularly related to the Universal Cheerleaders Association (UCA) competitions and their involvement with the university community. Here are some of the other accolades they have received: Award / Recognition Details Source 3rd Place Finish - UCA All-Girl Category Highest finish in this division in 2016 3rd Place Finish - UCA Small Coed Division I Game Day Earned in 2023 Community Impact Award Received at the 2025 Cheerleading Banquet Collegiate Recognition Award Awarded in 2024 for the first time in program history

Beyond competition and specific awards, the NKU Cheerleading program is recognized for its: Community Involvement: Active participation in events like the Buddy Walk for Down Syndrome, the DAV 5K for Disabled Veterans, local parades, and hosting youth camps. Academic Success: Many athletes are involved in student organizations such as Greek Life and the NKU Honors College, demonstrating strong academic commitment. These achievements and activities highlight the well-rounded nature of the NKU Cheerleading program, focusing on athletic excellence, community service, and academic success.

== Championships ==
Over the forty years Northern Kentucky has sponsored intercollegiate athletics the university has won three NCAA DII national championships, 33 GLVC championships, and seven GLVC All-Sport Awards

=== National championships ===
Sport	Winning years
Basketball (W)	2000, 2008
Soccer (M)	2010

=== Horizon League Championships ===
Sport	Winning years
Baseball	2024 (tournament)
Basketball (M)	2017 (tournament), 2018 (regular season), 2019 (tied regular season & tournament), 2020 (tournament)
Soccer (W)	2016 (tournament)
Volleyball (W)	2019 (tournament) 2025 (regular season)

=== Great Lakes Valley Conference Championships ===
Sport	Winning years
Baseball	2002, 2004, 2006, 2008, 2009
Basketball (M)	2003, 2009
Basketball (W)	1999, 2000, 2006, 2009
Golf (M)	2000, 2001, 2006, 2007, 2012
Golf (W)	2003, 2005, 2008
Soccer (M)	1987, 1992, 1993, 1995, 2010
Soccer (W)	1998, 1999, 2000, 2001, 2002, 2005, 2009
Softball	2005, 2009
Tennis (M)	1986, 1987, 1990, 2003, 2004
Tennis (W)	1988, 1999, 2000, 2001, 2002, 2004
Volleyball (W)	1985, 1995, 1997, 1998, 1999, 2000, 2001

NKU claimed the GLVC All-Sports Trophy seven times in its final 11 seasons in the conference: 1999–2000, 2000–02, 2004–06, 2008–10.

== Club sports ==
Students have also organized club teams in ice hockey, taekwondo, fencing, boxing, lacrosse, rugby, kickball, skeet & trap, ultimate frisbee, and Brazilian jiu-jitsu. These clubs are primarily organized through the Sport Club program.

== Facilities ==
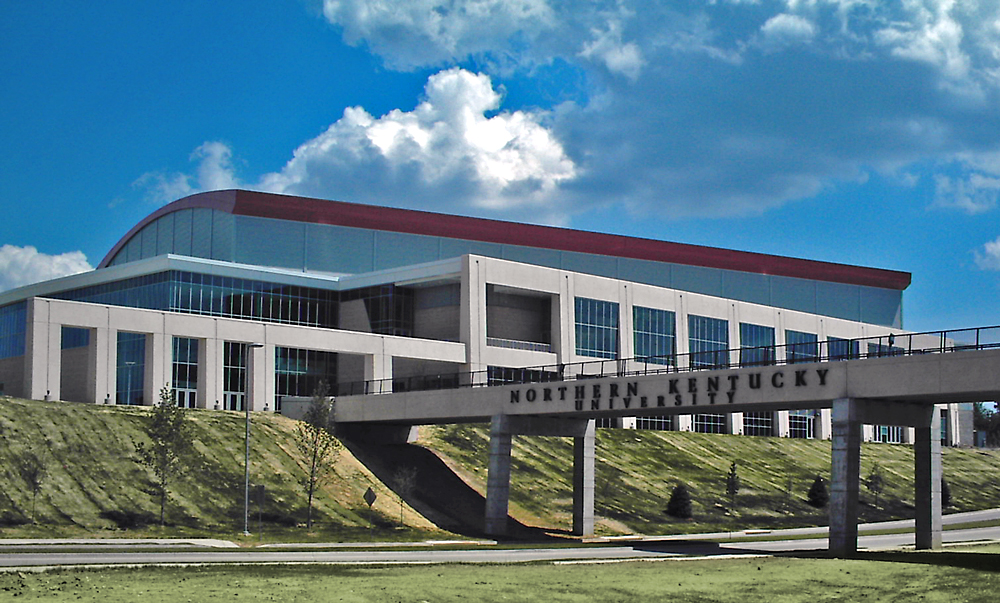
Truist Arena

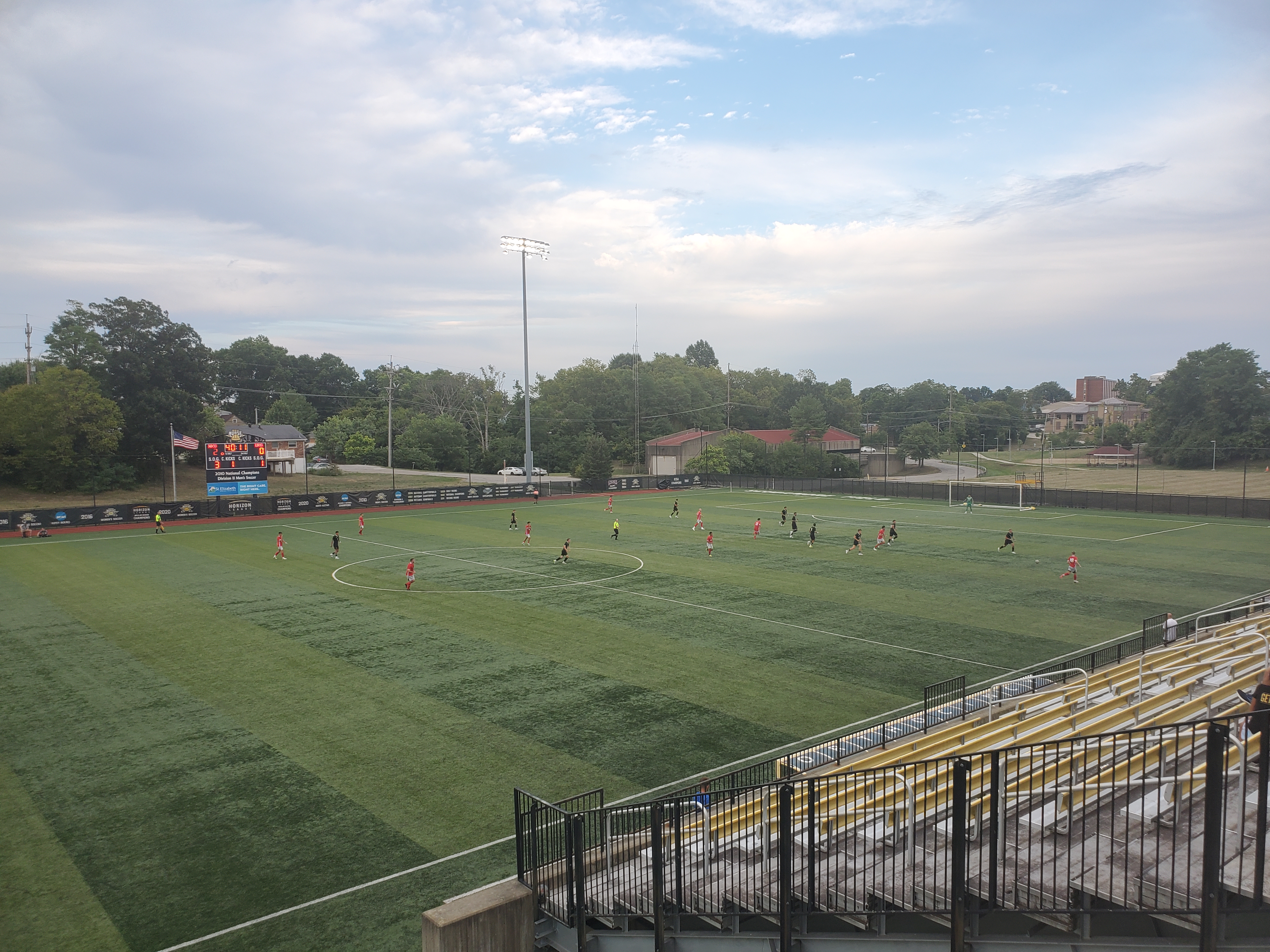
Scudamore Field

- Truist Arena, originally known as The Bank of Kentucky Center and later as BB&T Arena, is a 9,400-seat multi-purpose arena located on the NKU campus. It was completed in 2008 and is the home to men's and women's basketball teams, as well as graduation ceremonies. The arena is also home and other non-university entertainment and sporting events and the Kentucky Monsters of the Ultimate Indoor Football League. The arena name was first changed in 2015 following the purchase of The Bank of Kentucky by BB&T, and most recently in 2022, two years after BB&T merged with SunTrust to create Truist Financial. This latest name change was delayed because Truist did not start rebranding its Kentucky locations with the new corporate name until late 2021.
- Scuadmore Field (named "NKU Soccer Stadium" until 2022) is the home of Norse soccer teams. The $6.5-million, 1,000-seat facility was completed in the Fall of 2009 and is located next to Truist Arena. Stadium amenities include: seating for 1,000 spectators plus 1,000 sq ft (93 m^{2}) "Founders' Suite" luxury box, night lighting, a World Cup style 120-yard by 80-yard playing surface, concessions, coaches' offices, four locker rooms, athletic training facilities, and press box and media areas.
- Regents Hall is the home court for NKU volleyball and the practice facility for NKU men's and women's basketball. The gym seats about 1,800. The facility, along with the adjacent Albright Health Center houses most of the coaches within the department along with locker room facilities for the baseball, softball and cross country teams.
- The Bill Aker Baseball Complex at Friendship Field is the home field for NKU baseball. It has a seating capacity of 500 spectators.
- The Frank Ignatius Grein Softball Field is the home field for NKU softball. It has a seating capacity of about 500.
- The Joyce Yeager Tennis Complex is the home court for NKU tennis. The six-court facility is used as a competition venue as well as general use by the university community. There is seating available for about 200 spectators.
- The NKU cross country teams host the Queen City Invitational every third year at A.J. Jolly Park in Alexandria, Kentucky in conjunction with the University of Cincinnati and Xavier University.
