= Wright State Raiders =

- University: Wright State University
- Nickname: Raiders
- NCAA: Division I
- Conference: Horizon League (primary); Conference USA (bowling)
- Athletic director: Joylynn Brown
- Location: Fairborn, Ohio (mailing address: Dayton, Ohio)
- Varsity teams: 14 (7 men's and 7 women's)
- Basketball arena: Nutter Center
- Baseball stadium: Nischwitz Stadium
- Soccer stadium: Alumni Field
- Other venues: C.J. McLin Gymnasium
- Colors: Hunter green and vegas gold
- Mascot: Rowdy Raider
- Website: wsuraiders.com/index.aspx

The Wright State Raiders are the athletics teams of Wright State University in Fairborn, Ohio. The school currently participates in ten sports at the Division I level of the NCAA and are members of the Horizon League. In women's bowling, a sport not sponsored by the Horizon, the Raiders compete in Conference USA. The school's mascot is a wolf.

== History ==
Wright State was founded in 1964 as a branch campus of both Miami University (Ohio) and Ohio State University. The school began its athletic program in 1968 as an NCAA Division II school, where the athletics program achieved great success, having over 200 All-American athletes and winning the 1983 Division II Men's Basketball national championship. In 1987, Wright State began the transition to Division I athletics, with its first tournament qualifier being a golfer in 1988. In swimming, the school spent time in the Penn-Ohio Conference. From 1991 to 1994 the school was a member of the Mid-Continent Conference (now known as the Summit League) before moving in 1994 to the Midwestern Collegiate Conference (now known as the Horizon League). Since joining the Horizon, several teams have won conference titles, many athletes have been named to all-conference teams, and several coaches have won Coach of the Year honors.

Among the Raiders' most notable athletic achievements are the NCAA Division II men's basketball national championship in 1983, and taking a turn at March Madness in 1993, qualifying for the NCAA Division I men's basketball tournament as champion of the Mid-Continent Conference; the Raiders qualified again in 2007 as winner of the Horizon League tournament. The men's and women's swimming and diving teams were also consistently strong. The men won 6 of the last 13 conference championships.

Wright State previously sponsored softball, and the Raiders appeared in the NCAA Division I Softball Tournament four times. It announced the discontinuation of the program, along with men's and women's tennis, in June 2020, during the COVID-19 pandemic.

== Mascot ==
For many years, Wright State's sports teams used a character called Rowdy Raider as their mascot; a red-bearded Viking with a horned helmet, which emerged in 1986, a role played by Andrew "Legend" Winchek Jr. In 1997, the Viking was retired, and the Wolf was born. In 2007, Rowdy Raider received a new update for the mascot suit; a gray wolf that replaced the original brown wolf as the main mascot.

== Sports sponsored ==
A member of the Horizon League, Wright State University sponsors teams in seven men's and seven women's NCAA sanctioned sports:

| Men's sports | Women's sports |
|---|---|
| Baseball | Basketball |
| Basketball | Bowling |
| Cross country | Cross Country |
| Golf | Soccer |
| Soccer | Track and field^{†} |
| Track and field^{†} | Volleyball |
† – Track and field includes both indoor and outdoor

=== Men's basketball ===
The Wright State Raiders men's basketball team has seen the national spotlight several times since the program moved to Division I in 1987–88 and into the new Nutter Center in 1990. In 1993, the Raiders qualified for the NCAA Tournament, and since then Wright State is 5–1 all-time at home vs Top 25 competition. In 1995, Wright State defeated #25 Xavier, 71–70, their first ever home win over a Top 25 opponent. In the 1999–2000 season, Wright State beat #6 Michigan State at the Nutter Center, 53–49. On February 10, 2007, Wright State welcomed their Horizon League rival and ninth-ranked Butler Bulldogs to Dayton. In an impressive showing that would lead the Raiders to be named ESPN.com's "Team of the Week", Wright State dominated No. 9 Butler, 77–65. The Bulldogs returned to Dayton for the 2007 Horizon League tournament final, where Wright State again beat No. 17 Butler (by a score of 60–55) to earn a berth in its second-ever NCAA Tournament. DaShaun Wood, the Horizon League Player of the Year, led Wright State with 27 points and 5 assists. Wright State continued its streak the following season, defeating #13 Butler, 43–42. In 2016, Joe Thomasson was named to the Horizon League All-Defensive Team.

=== Women's basketball ===
The women's basketball program at Wright State University began in the 1973–74 season. It saw its first winning season two years later, earning a 9–8 record under the direction of coach Arnelle Jackson. In 2014 Wright State won its first Horizon League tournament championship to earn a berth to the NCAA tournament for the first time under coach Mike Bradbury. The Raiders have appeared in two postseason tournaments playing in the Women's Basketball Invitational in 2010 and 2011. The Raiders currently play their home games in the Nutter Center.

== Facilities ==
- Nutter Center – men's and women's basketball
- C.J. McLin Gymnasium – volleyball
- Nischwitz Stadium – baseball
- Alumni Field at Rinzler Student Sports Complex – men's & women's soccer
- Setzer Pavilion/Mills Morgan Center – training and athletics department

== Players in professional sports ==
- Brian Anderson - former Major League Baseball pitcher, who played 13 seasons for five teams, and currently a television color commentator for the Tampa Bay Rays.
- Trey Calvin - former Wright State basketball stand-out, currently playing international basketball for Valencia Basket
- Bill Edwards - played for the Philadelphia 76ers in 1993.
- Keith Gordon - drafted in June 1990 by the Cincinnati Reds in the 2nd round of the amateur draft.
- Tanner Holden - current NBA G League player for Salt Lake City Stars, former Wright State basketball stand-out.
- Frank Lickliter - PGA tour player since 1991. $10 million in career earnings with two PGA tournament titles and four second-place finishes.
- Loudon Love - former NBA G League and international player, Wright State basketball stand-out. Current assistant basketball coach at Southern Illinois under Scott Nagy.
- Sean Murphy - is a professional baseball player for the Atlanta Braves.
- Carlos Peña - former Major League Baseball player, who played 12 seasons for eight teams.
- Vitaly Potapenko - former professional basketball player for eleven seasons in the NBA, and currently an assistant coach for the Memphis Grizzlies.
- Joe Smith - former Major League Baseball player.
- Joe Thomasson - professional basketball player for Zenit Saint Petersburg of the VTB United League.
- DaShaun Wood - former professional basketball player in Europe.
