= IU Indy Jaguars =

Sports teams that represent Indiana University Indianapolis

- University: Indiana University Indianapolis
- Nickname: Jaguars
- NCAA: Division I
- Conference: Horizon League
- Athletic director: Luke Bosso
- Location: Indianapolis, Indiana
- Varsity teams: 18
- Basketball arena: James T. Morris Arena
- Soccer stadium: Michael A. Carroll Stadium
- Colors: White, Crimson, and Gray
- Mascot: Jawz, Jinx, and Jazzy
- Website: iuindyjags.com
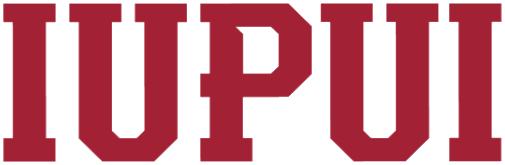

The IU Indy Jaguars are the 18 intercollegiate teams that represent Indiana University Indianapolis, in Indianapolis, Indiana, U.S. They compete in the National Collegiate Athletic Association's Division I. The teams were established by Indiana University–Purdue University Indianapolis (IUPUI). The Jaguars were originally known as the IUPUI Metros.

== History ==
IUPUI first sponsored intercollegiate athletics in 1972, when the men's basketball team began play as the IUPUI Metros. Women's sports were first sponsored in 1975, when the women's basketball, softball, and volleyball teams first competed. In 1978, the Metros joined the NAIA. They joined NCAA Division II in 1993 and moved up to NCAA Division I in 1997. Also in 1997, IU Indy joined the Mid-Continent Conference (now known as the Summit League), and officially changed their nickname to the Jaguars. In 2000, the men's soccer team became the first Jaguar team to compete in an NCAA tournament.

On July 1, 2017, the Jaguars left the Summit League to move to the Horizon League in all sports.

On August 12, 2022, the boards of trustees of both the IU and Purdue systems announced that IUPUI would split into two separate universities, with completion finalized on July 1, 2024. Administration of the athletic program fell to the new Indiana University Indianapolis. The official athletics website uses IU Indy as the main brand name, with the Jaguars nickname remaining in place.

== Sports ==
A member of the Horizon League, IU Indy sponsors teams in eight men's and ten women's NCAA sanctioned sports:

Men's sports	Women's sports
Basketball	Basketball
Cross country	Cross country
Golf	Golf
Soccer	Soccer
Swimming and diving	Softball
Tennis	Swimming and diving
Track & Field^{1}	Tennis
	Track & Field^{1}
	Volleyball
^{1} – includes both indoor and outdoor

IUPUI had a baseball team from 1979 until 2001.

=== Men's basketball ===
The 1984–85 and 1989–90 men's basketball teams won the NAIA District 21 Tournament and advanced to the NAIA National Tournament. The 1989–90 Jaguars defeated Siena Heights in the NAIA Tournament, but lost their next game to Pfeiffer.

The 2002–03 Jaguars won the Mid-Continent Conference Tournament (now called the Summit League) and were the first men's basketball team to reach the NCAA tournament. They lost in the first round to Kentucky.

Former basketball coach Ron Hunter accepted the head coaching position at Georgia State University and was succeeded by Todd Howard.

=== Women's basketball ===
The women's basketball team won the NAIA District 21 Tournament in 1989–1990 and 1990–1991. The 1990–1991 team advanced to the semifinals of the NAIA National Tournament before losing to Southwestern Oklahoma State.

The Jaguars clinched their first NCAA tournament berth by winning the 2020 Horizon League women's basketball tournament.

=== Men's soccer ===
The men's soccer team advanced to the NAIA Division 21 Playoffs in 1988, 1989, 1990, and 1993. The 1993 team advanced to the NAIA Division 21 Championship before their season ended. The 1994 team lost in the NAIA Division 21 Tournament.

In 2000, the Jaguars won the Mid-Continent Conference Tournament. They defeated Marist in an NCAA tournament play-in game. Their season ended with a loss to SMU in their only NCAA tournament. That year, the Jaguars finished with an 11–9–2 record.

=== Softball ===
The women's softball team competes at the NAIA level from 1983 through 1991. The Lady Metros (now Jaguars) appeared in nine straight NAIA regional and national tournaments, finishing third place twice and fourth place twice during that time span. They were coached by P. Nicholas Kellum who is now a member of the IUPUI Athletic Hall of Fame and was the school's first athletic director and served as the dean of the School of Physical Education for many years.

=== Women's tennis ===
The 2002–2003 and 2003–2004 tennis teams won the Mid-Continent Conference Tournament. They then advanced to the NCAA Tournament where they lost in the first round.

== Venues ==
Several Jaguars teams played in the IU Indy Gymnasium, popularly known as The Jungle. From 2014 to 2023 the men's basketball team played at the venue now known as Corteva Coliseum and returned to The Jungle in 2024. The softball team plays at the IUPUI Softball Complex, and the tennis team plays at the West Indy Racquet Club. The swimming team competes at the Indiana University Natatorium, which has a capacity of 4,700. The soccer teams play at IU Michael A. Carroll Track & Soccer Stadium.

Most of The Jungle's occupants moved to the new James T. Morris Arena in fall 2026. The opening event was a women's volleyball match against Wright State on October 16, 2026, followed by the first men's basketball game on November 2 and the first women's basketball game on November 5.

== Hall of Fame ==
- For an alphabetical list of inductees, see footnote
- For a list of inductees by sport, see footnote
- For a list of inductees by class year, see footnote
- For a list of inductees by induction year, see footnote

The IUPUI Intercollegiate Athletics Hall of Fame was founded in 1993.
