= Green Bay Phoenix =

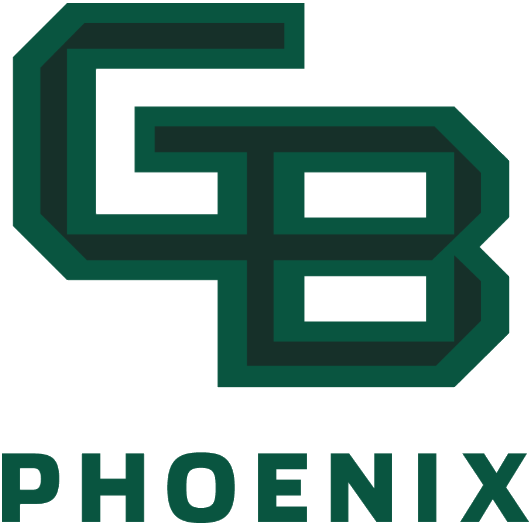
- University: University of Wisconsin–Green Bay
- Nickname: Phoenix
- NCAA: Division I
- Conference: Horizon League (primary); CCSA (Nordic skiing)
- Athletic director: Josh Moon
- Location: Green Bay, Wisconsin
- Varsity teams: 14
- Basketball arena: Resch Center (men); Kress Events Center (women)
- Softball stadium: Aldo Santaga Stadium
- Soccer stadium: Festival Foods Field at Aldo Santaga Stadium
- Colors: Green and white
- Mascot: Phlash the Phoenix
- Fight song: Hail To The Fighting Phoenix
- Website: greenbayphoenix.com

The Green Bay Phoenix, previously known as the UW–Green Bay Phoenix and UWGB Phoenix, are the athletic teams of the University of Wisconsin–Green Bay. A total of 14 Phoenix athletic teams compete in the Horizon League of NCAA Division I. The school does not sponsor a football team.

== Teams ==
A member of the Horizon League, the University of Wisconsin-Green Bay sponsors teams in six men's and eight women's sports.

Men's sports	Women's sports
Basketball	Basketball
Cross country	Cross country
Golf	Golf
Nordic skiing	Nordic skiing
Soccer	Soccer
Swimming and diving	Softball
	Swimming and diving
	Volleyball

=== Men's basketball ===
The Green Bay Phoenix men's basketball team is the NCAA Division I college basketball program representing the University of Wisconsin–Green Bay. The team competes in the Horizon League and plays its home games primarily at the Resch Center in Ashwaubenon, with some games at the on-campus Kress Events Center. The Phoenix program has competed at the Division I level since 1982, having transitioned from NAIA and NCAA Division II. A historical high point for the team was in the early-to-mid 1990s, where under former coach Dick Bennett, they secured multiple conference championships and made their first NCAA Tournament appearances. Overall, the program has earned five appearances in the NCAA Division I Tournament, with the most recent coming in 2016. Notable alumni who have gone on to professional careers include Tony Bennett and Keifer Sykes.

=== Women's basketball ===
During the 2008/09-2012/13 seasons, the Green Bay women's basketball team had the third highest winning-percentage in the NCAA Division I with a 175–21 mark trailing only Connecticut and Stanford. The Phoenix has the fifth-most wins in Division I during that same stretch. The Phoenix entered the 2017–18 season on a string of 40 consecutive winning seasons, with only Tennessee having a longer such streak in women's college basketball. Green Bay has won or tied for the Horizon League regular-season championship since 2000, the longest active streak in Division I NCAA women's basketball. In those 17 years, the team has only lost the conference tournament three times, in the 2000–01, 2009–10, and 2013–14 seasons. Since the 2002–03 season, Green Bay has been ranked in the top 25 polls, with the highest ranking being #9 at the conclusion of the 2010–11 season when they made it to the Sweet 16 where they lost to the University of Baylor, 86–76. They have been to the NCAA tournament 18 times, advancing to the second round five times and to the Sweet 16 once.

=== Softball ===
In the 2005 season, they claimed their first Horizon League tournament championship after being picked to finish last in the conference. They went on to the national tournament, where they defeated #6 seed Oregon State in the first round of the tournament. They also won both the Horizon League regular season title as well as the Horizon League tournament title in 2014.

== National championships ==
=== Team ===
Sport	Association	Division	Year	Opponent/Runner-up	Score
Women's swimming and diving (1)	NAIA	Single	1984	Wisconsin–Eau Claire	397–290

== Notable sports figures ==
=== Athletes ===
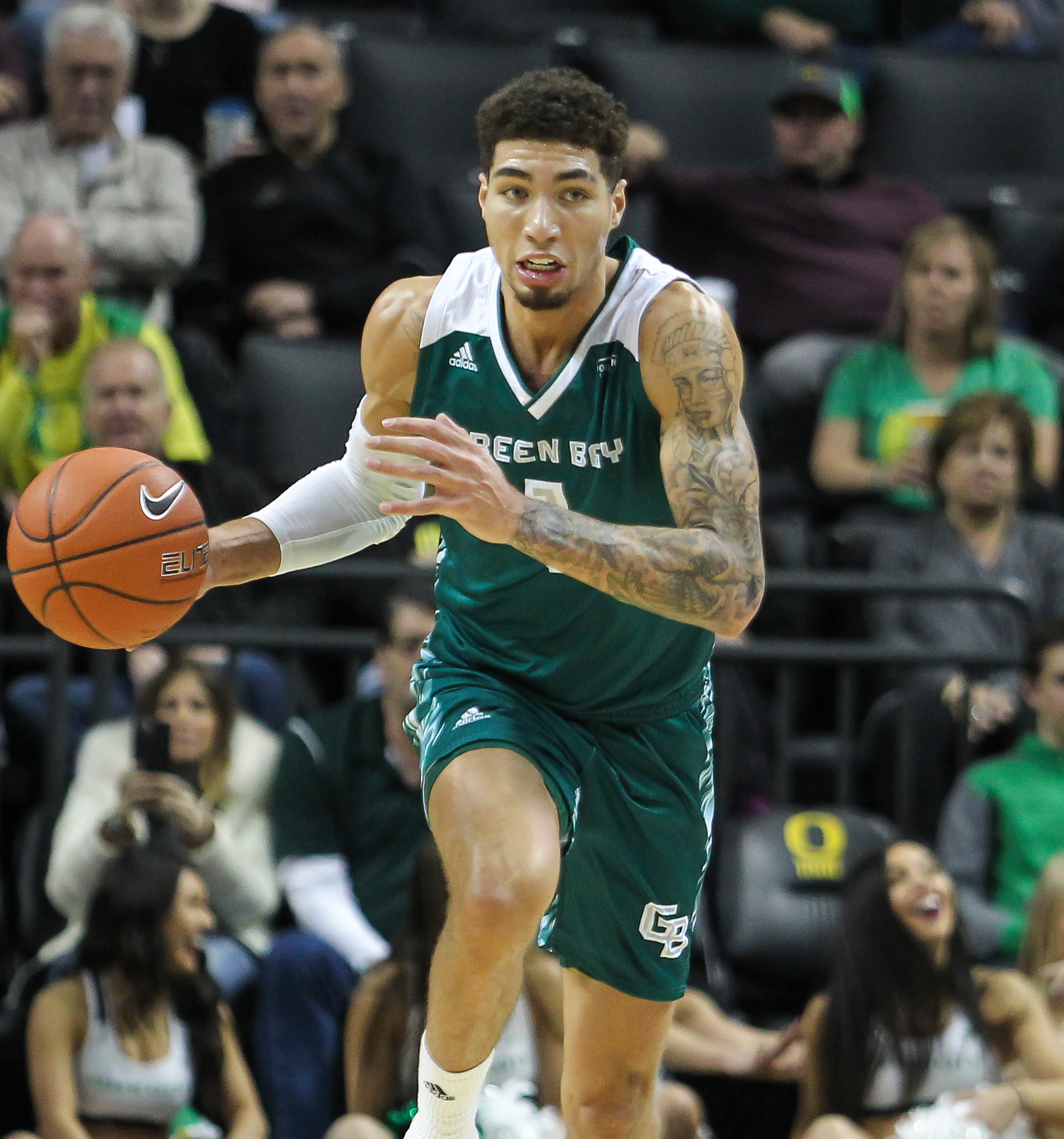
Sandy Cohen

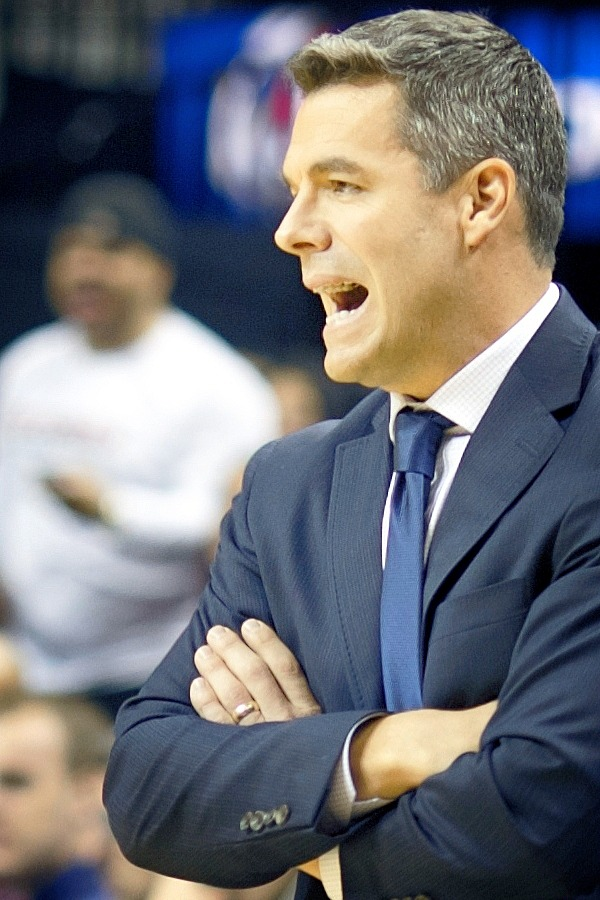
Tony Bennett

- Tony Bennett, former NBA basketball player and former men's head basketball coach at the University of Virginia
- Alec Brown, former NBA player, currently playing overseas
- Sandy Cohen, basketball player in the Israeli Basketball Premier League
- Alfonzo McKinnie, NBA player, currently playing in the NBA G League
- Jeff Nordgaard, former NBA basketball player
- Tosaint Ricketts, professional soccer player for FK Sūduva and Canada men's national soccer team
- Keifer Sykes, professional basketball player, currently playing in the NBA G League
- Logan Vander Velden, former NBA basketball player

=== Coaches ===
- Dick Bennett, former head basketball coach (and father of the aforementioned Tony Bennett)
- Kevin Borseth, former and legendary women's head basketball coach
