= Horizon League men's soccer tournament =

- Sport: College soccer
- Conference: Horizon League
- Number of teams: 6
- Format: Single-elimination tournament
- Current stadium: Oakland Soccer Field
- Current location: Rochester, Michigan
- Played: 1987–present
- Last contest: 2026
- Current champion: Cleveland State (4th title)
- Most championships: Milwaukee & UIC (6 each)
- TV partner(s): ESPN3, ESPN+
- Official website: horizonleague.org/msoc

The Horizon League men's soccer tournament is the conference championship tournament in soccer for the Horizon League. The tournament has been held every year since 1987. It is a single-elimination tournament and seeding is based on regular season records.

The winner, declared conference champion, receives the conference's automatic bid to the NCAA Division I men's soccer championship.

Milwaukee and UIC are the most winning teams of the competition, with 6 titles each.

== Champions ==
The following is a list of Horizon League Tournament winners:

=== Finals ===
Key

- (1) – Title number
- a.e.t. – Match went to extra time
- p – Match decided by a penalty shootout after extra time
- – Winning team won regular season

=== Finals ===
Ed.	Year	Champion	Score	Runner-up	Venue	City
1	1987	Evansville (1)	2–1	Saint Louis	Carroll Stadium	Indianapolis, IN
2	1988	Notre Dame (1)	2–0	Saint Louis	Anheuser-Busch Center	Fenton, MO
3	1989	Evansville (2)	4–1	Saint Louis	Anheuser-Busch Center	Fenton, MO
4	1990	Evansville (3)	2–0	Saint Louis	Anheuser-Busch Center	Fenton, MO
5	1991	Evansville (4)	2–0	Notre Dame	Carroll Stadium	Indianapolis, IN
6	1992	Evansville (5)	2–1	La Salle	Carroll Stadium	Indianapolis, IN
7	1993	Notre Dame (2)	2–0	Detroit	Carroll Stadium	Indianapolis, IN
8	1994	Notre Dame (3)	3–2 (a.e.t.)	Milwaukee	Alumni Stadium	South Bend, IN
9	1995	Butler (1)	5–2 (a.e.t.)	Detroit	NIU Soccer Complex	DeKalb, IL
10	1996	Detroit (1)	2–0	Butler	Carroll Stadium	Indianapolis, IN
11	1997	Butler (2)	1–0	Milwaukee	Engelmann Field	Milwaukee, WI
12	1998	Butler (3)	2–0	Wright State	Carroll Stadium	Indianapolis, IN
13	1999	UIC (1)	2–0	Detroit	Carroll Stadium	Indianapolis, IN
14	2000	UIC (2)	3–1	Green Bay	Flames Field	Chicago, IL
15	2001	Butler (4)	2–0	Milwaukee	Engelmann Field	Milwaukee, WI
16	2002	Milwaukee (1)	8–0	Cleveland State	Engelmann Field	Milwaukee, WI
17	2003	Milwaukee (2)	1–0	Butler	Engelmann Field	Milwaukee, WI
18	2004	Milwaukee (3)	3–2	Detroit	Engelmann Field	Milwaukee, WI
19	2005	Milwaukee (4)	1–0	Detroit	Titan Field	Detroit, MI
20	2006	Loyola-Chicago (1)	1–0	Green Bay	Flames Field	Chicago, IL
21	2007	UIC (3)	3–1	Green Bay	Loyola Soccer Park	Chicago, IL
22	2008	Loyola-Chicago (2)	1–0	Cleveland State	Flames Field	Chicago, IL
23	2009	Green Bay (1)	0–0 (3–2 p)	Butler	Carroll Stadium	Indianapolis, IN
24	2010	Butler (5)	1–1 (3–2 p)	Green Bay	Carroll Stadium	Indianapolis, IN
25	2011	Loyola-Chicago (3)	1–0 (a.e.t.)	Wright State	Eastgate Field	Valparaiso, IN
26	2012	Cleveland State (1)	2–0	Loyola-Chicago	Titan Field	Detroit, MI
27	2013	Milwaukee (5)	1–0	UIC	Flames Field	Chicago, IL
28	2014	Oakland (1)	2–1	Wright State	Oakland Soccer Field	Rochester, MI
29	2015	Oakland (2)	1–0	UIC	Flames Field	Chicago, IL
30	2016	UIC (4)	1–0	Wright State	Alumni Field	Dayton, OH
31	2017	UIC (5)	2–0	Green Bay	Flames Field	Chicago, IL
32	2018	UIC (6)	3–1	Wright State	Alumni Field	Dayton, OH
33	2019	Wright State (1)	1–1 (4–3 p)	Milwaukee	Flames Field	Chicago, IL
34	2020	Milwaukee (6)	1–0	Northern Kentucky	NKU Soccer Stadium	Highland Heights, KY
35	2021	Oakland (3)	3–1	Cleveland State	Oakland Soccer Field	Rochester, MI
36	2022	Cleveland State (2)	3–0	IUPUI	Krenzler Field	Cleveland, OH
37	2023	Green Bay (2)	1–0	Oakland	Oakland Soccer Field	Rochester, MI
38	2024	Robert Morris (1)	1–0	Oakland	Oakland Soccer Field	Rochester, MI
39	2025	Cleveland State (3)	1–0 (a.e.t.)	Purdue Fort Wayne	Krenzler Field	Cleveland, OH
40	2026	Cleveland State (4)	3–2	Purdue Fort Wayne	Hefner Soccer Complex	Fort Wayne, IN

== Performance by school ==
School	Titles	Winning years
Milwaukee	6	2002, 2003, 2004, 2005, 2013, 2020
UIC	6	1999, 2000, 2007, 2016, 2017, 2018
Evansville	5	1987, 1989, 1990, 1991, 1992
Butler	5	1995, 1997, 1998, 2001, 2010
Cleveland State	4	2012, 2022, 2025, 2026
Notre Dame	3	1988, 1993, 1994
Oakland	3	2014, 2015, 2021
Green Bay	2	2009, 2023
Loyola Chicago	2	2008, 2011
Detroit Mercy	1	1996
Wright State	1	2019
Robert Morris	1	2024
Total (all schools)	39	

Four current members—IU Indy, Northern Illinois, Northern Kentucky, and Purdue Fort Wayne—have yet to win the tournament. Of these, Purdue Fort Wayne is the only one not to have advanced to the championship game (IU Indy did so as IUPUI).

Italics indicate a school that is no longer a conference member
† No longer sponsor men's soccer
