= 2016 Horizon League men's soccer season =

- League: NCAA Division I
- Sport: Soccer
- Duration: August, 2016 – November, 2016
- Teams: 10

2017 MLS SuperDraft
- Top draft pick: Andrew Putna, UIC
- Picked by: Real Salt Lake, 48th overall

Regular season
- Season champions: Wright State
- Runners-up: UIC
- Season MVP: Peguy Ngatcha

Tournament
- Champions: UIC
- Runners-up: Wright State
- Finals MVP: Oscar Rivero

Horizon League men's soccer seasons
- ← 2015 2017 →

2016 Horizon League men's soccer standings
	Conf.					Overall
Team	W		L		T	W		L		T
Wright State	7	–	1	–	1	11	–	6	–	3
Milwaukee	5	–	3	–	1	8	–	8	–	2
UIC ‡	5	–	3	–	1	9	–	8	–	3
Oakland	5	–	4	–	0	6	–	10	–	1
Valparaiso	4	–	3	–	2	12	–	4	–	3
Cleveland State	4	–	3	–	2	7	–	8	–	2
Green Bay	4	–	3	–	2	5	–	9	–	2
Belmont	2	–	5	–	2	3	–	12	–	3
Detroit	1	–	6	–	2	3	–	10	–	4
Northern Kentucky	1	–	7	–	1	1	–	12	–	4
‡-Tournament champion +-Invited to the NCAA Division I Men's Soccer Championship Date= 18 November 2016; Rankings from NSCAA

The 2016 Horizon League men's soccer season is the 24th season of men's varsity soccer in the conference.

The UIC Flames are the defending regular season champions, and the Oakland Golden Grizzlies are the defending tournament champions.

== Changes from 2015 ==
- Paul Doroh joins the Oakland Golden Grizzlies coaching staff.

== Teams ==
=== Stadiums and locations ===
Team	Location	Stadium	Capacity
Belmont Bruins	Nashville, Tennessee	E. S. Rose Park	2,500
Cleveland State Vikings	Cleveland, Ohio	Krenzler Field	1,680
Detroit Titans	Detroit, Michigan	Titan Field	600
Green Bay Phoenix	Green Bay, Wisconsin	Aldo Santaga Stadium	3,500
Milwaukee Panthers	Milwaukee, Wisconsin	Engelmann Field	2,200
Northern Kentucky Norse	Highland Heights, Kentucky	NKU Soccer Stadium	1,000
Oakland Golden Grizzlies	Rochester, Michigan	Oakland Soccer Field	1,000
UIC Flames	Chicago, Illinois	Flames Field	1,000
Valparaiso Crusaders	Valparaiso, Indiana	Eastgate Field	500
Wright State Raiders	Dayton, Ohio	Alumni Field	1,000

== Regular season ==
=== Rankings ===
==== NSCAA National ====
Legend
Increase in ranking
Decrease in ranking
Not ranked previous week

		Pre	Wk 1	Wk 2	Wk 3	Wk 4	Wk 5	Wk 6	Wk 7	Wk 8	Wk 9	Wk 10	Wk 11	Wk 12	Final
Belmont	C														
Cleveland State	C														
Detroit	C														
Green Bay	C														
Milwaukee	C														
Northern Kentucky	C														
Oakland	C														
UIC	C														
Valparaiso	C														
Wright State	C														

==== NSCAA Great Lakes Regional ====
Legend
Increase in ranking
Decrease in ranking
Not ranked previous week

		Wk 1	Wk 2	Wk 3	Wk 4	Wk 5	Wk 6	Wk 7	Wk 8	Wk 9	Wk 10	Wk 11	Wk 12	Final
Belmont	C													
Cleveland State	C	7	NR											
Detroit	C													
Green Bay	C													
Milwaukee	C	10	NR											
Northern Kentucky	C													
Oakland	C													
UIC	C													
Valparaiso	C							10	NR			10		
Wright State	C		9	NR		9	NR		10	10	8	8		

== Postseason ==
=== Horizon League Tournament ===
Semifinals
1	Wright State (pen.)	1 (6)
4	Oakland	1 (5)
2	UIC (OT)	2
3	Milwaukee	1

Final
1	Wright State	0
2	UIC	1

=== NCAA tournament ===
Seed	Region	School	1st round	2nd round	3rd round	Quarterfinals	Semifinals	Championship
—N/a	Louisville	UIC	L, 0–2 vs. Loyola Chicago – (Chicago)					

== All-Horizon League awards and teams ==
2016 Horizon League Men's Soccer Individual Awards
Award	Recipient(s)
Player of the Year	Peguy Ngatcha, Wright State
Offensive Player of the Year	Peguy Ngatcha, Wright State
Defensive Player of the Year	Sergio Manesio, Cleveland State
Goalkeeper of the Year	Andrew Putna, UIC
Freshman of the Year	Evan Conway, Milwaukee
Coach of the Year	Bryan Davis, Wright State

2016 Horizon League Men's Soccer All-Conference Teams
First Team	Second Team	Rookie Team
Max Todd, UIC (So., F); Peguy Ngatcha, Wright State (Sr., F); Eric Lynch, Wright State (Sr., F); Alec Nagucki, Cleveland State (Jr., MF); Jose Fuentes, UIC (Jr., MF); Isaiah Madrid, Valparaiso (Sr., MF); Sergio Manesio, Cleveland State (Sr., D); Omar Lawrence, Valparaiso (Sr., D); Jake Stovall, Wright State (Sr., D); Kaique Fernandes, Wright State (Sr., D); Andrew Putna, UIC (Sr., GK)	Jake Lagania, Cleveland State (Jr., F); Spiro Pliakos, Detroit Mercy (Jr., F); Nick Moon, Milwaukee (Jr., F); Kendan Anderson, Valparaiso (Sr., F); Francesco Saporito, Milwaukee (So., MF); Jackson Dietrich, Wright State (So., MF); AJ Paterson, Wright State (Jr., MF); Andre Baires, Green Bay (Fr., D); Jon Stadler, Milwaukee (Jr., D); Adrian Graham, Valparaiso (Sr., D); Nico Campbell, Valparaiso (Sr., GK)	Mertcan Akar, Belmont (GK); Eli Crognale, Belmont (MF); Lawrence Karpeh, Cleveland State (F); Andre Baires, Green Bay (D); Evan Conway, Milwaukee (F); Nyal Higgins, Oakland (D); Nebojsa Popovic, Oakland (MF); Cristian Sanchez, UIC (D); Alexander Cervantes, UIC (F); Steffen Pulinx, Valparaiso (D); Austin Kinley, Wright State (D)

== See also ==
- 2016 NCAA Division I men's soccer season
- 2016 Horizon League Men's Soccer Tournament
- 2016 Horizon League women's soccer season
