= 2016 Horizon League men's soccer tournament =

- Classification: Division I
- Teams: 6
- Matches: 5
- Site: Wright State Alumni Field; Dayton, Ohio
- Champions: UIC (5th title)
- Winning coach: Sean Phillips (2nd title)
- Broadcast: HLTV, ESPN3

2016 Horizon League men's soccer standings
| | Conf. | | | | | Overall |
| Team | W | | L | | T | W | | L | | T |
|---|---|---|---|---|---|---|---|---|---|---|
| Wright State | 7 | – | 1 | – | 1 | 11 | – | 6 | – | 3 |
| Milwaukee | 5 | – | 3 | – | 1 | 8 | – | 8 | – | 2 |
| UIC ‡ | 5 | – | 3 | – | 1 | 9 | – | 8 | – | 3 |
| Oakland | 5 | – | 4 | – | 0 | 6 | – | 10 | – | 1 |
| Valparaiso | 4 | – | 3 | – | 2 | 12 | – | 4 | – | 3 |
| Cleveland State | 4 | – | 3 | – | 2 | 7 | – | 8 | – | 2 |
| Green Bay | 4 | – | 3 | – | 2 | 5 | – | 9 | – | 2 |
| Belmont | 2 | – | 5 | – | 2 | 3 | – | 12 | – | 3 |
| Detroit | 1 | – | 6 | – | 2 | 3 | – | 10 | – | 4 |
| Northern Kentucky | 1 | – | 7 | – | 1 | 1 | – | 12 | – | 4 |
‡-Tournament champion +-Invited to the NCAA Division I Men's Soccer Championship Date= 18 November 2016; Rankings from NSCAA

The 2016 Horizon League men's soccer tournament was the 29th edition of the tournament. It determined the Horizon League's automatic berth into the 2016 NCAA Division I Men's Soccer Championship. UIC enter the tournament as the defending champions.

The 2016 final was a repeat of last year's final. The UIC Flames took on the Wright State Raiders in the championship, where the Flames, once again, came out on top. UIC's Oscar Rivero scored the game-winning goal off of a corner kick in the 85th minute to seal the fifth-ever title for the Flames. It was Wright State's third-consecutive trip to the Horizon League final, and third-consecutive defeat in the final.

The semifinals and finals of the tournament was hosted by Wright State University and all matches were contested at Wright State Alumni Field.

== Seeds ==
The top four teams participate in the tournament. The seeding is based on the program's conference record during the 2016 Horizon League season.

| Seed | School | Conference | Tiebreaker |
|---|---|---|---|
| 1 | Wright State | 7–1–1 | |
| 2 | UIC | 5–3–1 | 1–0 vs. MKE |
| 3 | Milwaukee | 5–3–1 | 0–1 vs. UIC |
| 4 | Oakland | 5–4 | |
| 5 | Green Bay | 4–3–2 | 1–0–1 vs. VALPO and CSU |
| 6 | Valparaiso | 4–3–2 | 1–1 vs. UWGB and CSU |

- Cleveland State also had 4–3–2 conference records but a poorer record against Green Bay and Valparaiso

== Bracket ==
Quarterfinals
4 | Oakland | 1
5 | Green Bay | 0
3 | Milwaukee (pen.) | 0 (5)
6 | Valparaiso | 0 (3)

Semifinals
1 | Wright State (pen.) | 0 (6)
4 | Oakland | 0 (5)
2 | UIC | 2
3 | Milwaukee | 1

Final
1 | Wright State | 0
2 | UIC | 1

== Results ==
=== Quarterfinals ===
| November 7 | ^{#3} Milwaukee | 0–0 (a.e.t.) (5–3 p) | ^{#6} Valparaiso | Milwaukee, Wisconsin |
| 7:00 PM EDT | | Report | | Stadium: Engelmann Field; Attendance: 295; Referee: Dimitar Chavdarov |
| | Penalties |
| | Kaye (penalty scored); Stadler (penalty scored); Moon (penalty scored); Flaatedal (penalty scored); Saporito (penalty scored) | | (penalty missed) Thompson; (penalty scored) Thomas; (penalty scored) Anderson; (penalty scored) Rose |

| November 7 | ^{#4} Oakland | 1–0 | ^{#5} Green Bay | Rochester, Michigan |
| 7:00 PM EDT | Ricci 37' | Report | | Stadium: Oakland Soccer Field; Attendance: 457 |

=== Semifinals ===
| November 10 | ^{#2} UIC | 2–1 (a.e.t.) | ^{#3} Milwaukee | Dayton, Ohio |
| 4:00 PM EDT | Rivero 74'; Gonzalez 98' | Report | Raymonds 45' | Stadium: Alumni Field; Attendance: 122; Referee: Sorin Stoica |

| November 10 | ^{#1} Wright State | 1–1 (a.e.t.) (6–5 p) | ^{#4} Oakland | Dayton, Ohio |
| 7:00 PM EDT | Paterson 81' | Report | Ricci 82' | Stadium: Alumni Field; Attendance: 739; Referee: Abiodum Okulaja |
| | Penalties |
| | Zwiesler (penalty scored); Lynch (penalty scored); Ngatcha (penalty scored); Dietrich (penalty scored); Stoval (penalty scored); Paterson (penalty scored) | | (penalty scored) Strack; (penalty scored) Serwatka; (penalty scored) Popovic; (penalty scored) Jabbori; (penalty scored) Ricci; (penalty missed) Shaw |

=== Final ===
| November 10 | ^{#1} Wright State | 0–1 | ^{#2} UIC | Dayton, Ohio |
| 6:00 PM EDT | | Report | Rivero 86' | Stadium: Alumni Field; Attendance: 873; Referee: Peter Dhima |

== Awards ==
**Horizon Men’s Soccer All-Tournament team**

Chase Jabbori, Oakland
Austin Ricci, Oakland
Oliver Hasland, Milwaukee
Magnus Flaatedal, Milwaukee
Jake Stovall, Wright State
Jackson Dietrich, Wright State
AJ Paterson, Wright State
Andrew Putna, UIC
Max Todd, UIC
Oscar Gonzales, UIC
**Oscar Rivero**, UIC

MVP's in Bold

== See also ==
- 2016 Horizon League men's soccer season
- 2016 NCAA Division I men's soccer season
- 2016 NCAA Division I Men's Soccer Championship
- Horizon League Men's Soccer Tournament
