= 2019 Horizon League men's soccer tournament =

- Classification: Division I
- Teams: 6
- Matches: 5
- Quarterfinals site: Titan Field; Aldo Santaga Stadium; Detroit, Michigan; Green Bay, Wisconsin
- Semifinals site: Flames Field; Chicago, IL
- Finals site: Flames Field; Chicago, IL
- Champions: Wright State (1st title)
- Winning coach: Jake Slemker (1st title)
- MVP: Joel Sundell (Wright State)
- Broadcast: ESPN+

2019 Horizon League men's soccer standings
	Conf.					Overall
Team	W		L		T	W		L		T
UIC	6	–	2	–	0	12	–	5	–	1
Oakland	4	–	2	–	2	7	–	9	–	3
Detroit Mercy	4	–	3	–	1	7	–	11	–	1
Green Bay	4	–	4	–	0	6	–	8	–	2
Wright State ‡	4	–	4	–	0	11	–	8	–	4
Milwaukee	3	–	3	–	2	10	–	6	–	4
Cleveland State	3	–	5	–	0	7	–	7	–	1
Northern Kentucky	3	–	5	–	0	7	–	10	–	1
IUPUI	2	–	5	–	1	4	–	10	–	3
‡ – 2019 Horizon Tournament champion + – Invited to the 2019 NCAA tournament; As of 25 November 2019; Rankings from United Soccer Coaches

The 2019 Horizon League men's soccer tournament was the 32nd edition of the tournament. The tournament decided the Horizon League champion and guaranteed representative into the 2019 NCAA Division I men's soccer tournament. The tournament began on November 11 and concluded on November 16, 2019.

Wright State won their first Horizon League championship, defeating Milwaukee 4–3 in penalty kicks after a 1–1 draw in regulation time and extra time. It was Wright State's first ever Horizon League tournament championship. Three-time defending champions, UIC, were eliminated in the semifinals by Milwaukee. Wright State second year head coach, Jake Slemker, won his first title with the Raiders.

Joel Sundell of Wright State won the Horizon League Tournament Most valuable player.

With the victory, Wright State earned the conference's automatic bid into the NCAA Tournament, which marked Wright State's first ever trip to the NCAA Tournament. In the opening round, Wright State upset Notre Dame 3–2 in the first round, before losing on penalty kicks to Michigan in the second round.

== Seeds ==
Seed	School	Conference	Points	Tiebreaker
1	UIC	6–2–0	18	
2	Oakland	4–2–2	14	
3	Detroit Mercy	4–3–1	13	
4	Green Bay	4–4–0	12	Green Bay 1–0 vs. Wright State
5	Wright State	4–4–0	12	Wright State 0–1 vs.Green Bay
6	Milwaukee	3–3–2	11	

== Bracket ==
Quarterfinals; Nov. 11
3	Detroit Mercy	0
6	Milwaukee	2
4	Green Bay	2
5	Wright State	1

Semifinals; Nov. 14
1	UIC	0 (0)
6	Milwaukee (pen.)	0 (3)
2	Oakland	1
5	Milwaukee	4

Final; Nov. 16
6	Milwaukee	1 (3)
5	Wright State (pen.)	1 (4)

== Results ==
=== First round ===
November 5
7:00 p.m. EST

No. 3 Oakland	0–1	No. 6 Milwaukee
	Report	Latinovich 54'

Oakland Soccer Field
Rochester, Michigan
Attendance: 155
Referee: Art Arustamyan

November 5
8:00 p.m. EST

No. 4 Green Bay	2–3 (a.e.t.)	No. 5 IUPUI
Carreon 38'; Mansa 81'	Report	Goede 15'; Siasia 25'; Souza 97'

Aldo Santaga Stadium
Green Bay, Wisconsin
Attendance: 338
Referee: Jorge Cuate

=== Semifinals ===
November 8
4:00 p.m. EST

No. 2 UIC	1–1 (a.e.t.)	No. 5 IUPUI
González 80'	Report	Siasia 57'
Penalties
Todd (penalty scored); Pérez (penalty scored); Ash (penalty scored); Moore (penalty scored)	4–2	(penalty scored) Aguilar; (penalty missed) Patacca; (penalty scored) Zampieri; (penalty missed) Goede

Alumni Field
Dayton, Ohio
Attendance: 182
Referee: Michael Allie

November 8
7:00 p.m. EST

No. 1 Wright State	1–1 (a.e.t.)	No. 6 Milwaukee
Corfe 37'	Report	Conway 64'
Penalties
(penalty missed) Suad Suljic; (penalty missed) Henrik Fennefoss; (penalty scored) Vuk Latinovich; (penalty scored) Sean Holmes; (penalty scored) Evan Conway	4–3	(penalty scored) Deri Corfe; (penalty scored) Stefan Rokvic; (penalty scored) Harvey Slade; (penalty missed) Dan Bent; (penalty scored) Jackson Dietrich

Alumni Field
Dayton, Ohio
Attendance: 392
Referee: Josh Kelly

=== Final ===
November 10
6:00 p.m. EST

No. 1 Wright State	1–3	No. 2 UIC
Tajak Dominik 81'	Report	4', 88' Josiah Ash; 35' Pau Mateo

Alumni Field
Dayton, Ohio
Attendance: 623
Referee: Calin Radosav

== All-Tournament team ==
Following the championship game, the Horizon League All-Tournament team was announced.

Player	Team
Horizon League Men's Soccer All-Tournament team
Joel Sundell (MVP)	Wright State
Deri Corfe	Wright State
Jackson Dietrich	Wright State
Ids Hannema	Wright State
Evan Conway	Milwaukee
Vuk Latinovich	Milwaukee
Freddy Lorezen	Milwaukee
Jacob Graiber	UIC
Jesus Perez	UIC
Luke Morrell	Oakland
Charlie Braithwaite	Oakland
