= 2025 Horizon League men's soccer tournament =

- Classification: Division I
- Teams: 6
- Matches: 5
- Site: Krenzler Field; Cleveland, Ohio (Semifinals & Final)
- Champions: Cleveland State (3 title)
- Winning coach: Sinisa Ubiparipovic (2 title)
- MVP: Matteo Correia (Cleveland State)
- Broadcast: ESPN+

2025 Horizon League men's soccer standings
	Conf.					Overall
Team	W		L		T	W		L		T
Cleveland State †‡	5	–	1	–	3	9	–	4	–	6
Purdue Fort Wayne	5	–	2	–	2	8	–	3	–	6
Green Bay	5	–	3	–	1	9	–	7	–	2
Milwaukee	3	–	1	–	5	4	–	7	–	8
Robert Morris	3	–	1	–	5	6	–	4	–	7
Oakland	3	–	3	–	3	3	–	9	–	6
IU Indy	3	–	5	–	1	6	–	8	–	3
Detroit Mercy	2	–	5	–	2	5	–	10	–	3
Northern Kentucky	2	–	5	–	2	4	–	10	–	3
Wright State	2	–	7	–	0	2	–	13	–	1
† – Conference champion ‡ – 2025 Horizon tournament champion + – At-large invitation to the 2025 NCAA tournament; As of December 6, 2025; Rankings from United Soccer Coaches; Source: Horizon

The 2025 Horizon League men's soccer tournament was the postseason men's soccer tournament for the Horizon League. It was held from November 9 through November 14, 2025. The quarterfinals of the tournament were held at campus sites, while semifinals and final took place at Oakland Soccer Field in Rochester, Michigan. The six team single-elimination tournament consisted of three rounds based on seeding from regular season conference play.

== Seeding ==
Six Horizon League schools participated in the 2025 tournament. Teams were seeded by conference record. The top two seeds received byes to the Semifinals and the number one seed hosted the Semifinals and Final. The Milwaukee Panthers and the Robert Morris Colonials seeding was determined by a tie breaker since they both ended the season with 14 points.

Seed	School	Conference Record	Points
1	Cleveland State	5–1–3	18
2	Purdue Fort Wayne	5–2–2	17
3	Green Bay	5–3–1	16
4	Milwaukee	3–1–5	14
5	Robert Morris	3–1–5	14
6	Oakland	4–4–1	12

== Bracket ==
Quarterfinals; Sunday, Nov. 5
4	Milwaukee	1
5	Robert Morris	2
3	Green Bay	2
6	Oakland	0

Semifinals; Thursday, Nov. 12
1	Cleveland State	2
5	Robert Morris	0
2	Purdue Fort Wayne	2 (4)
3	Green Bay	2 (3)

Final; Saturday, Nov. 15
1	Cleveland State	1
2	Purdue Fort Wayne	0

== Schedule ==
=== Quarterfinals ===
November 9, 2025	#3 Green Bay	2–0	#6 Oakland	Green Bay, WI
2:00 p.m. CST	Oakland Own Goal 12'; Alek Pituch (yellow card) 59'; Ty Perkins (yellow card) 72'; Chris Album 83'	Report	(yellow card) 76' Gabriel Baylon	Stadium: Aldo Santaga Stadium; Attendance: 423; Referee: Youssef Elmessoussi; Assistant referees: Scott Irwin; Ryan Shanklin; Fourth official: Joseluis Garcia

November 9, 2025	#4 Milwaukee	1–2	#5 Robert Morris	Milwaukee, WI
1:00 p.m. CST	Jack Bretzmann 56'; Jack Wanger (yellow card) 89'	Report	(yellow card) 31' Royie Rahamim; 46', 88' (pen.) Anass Hadran; (yellow card) 55' Josh Lane	Stadium: Engelmann Stadium; Attendance: 137; Referee: Austin Saini; Assistant referees: Jeffrey Mellen; Khalaf Al-Latayfeh Malkawi; Fourth official: Dylan Seitz

=== Semifinals ===
November 12, 2025	#1 Cleveland State	2–0	#5 Robert Morris	Cleveland, OH
4:00 p.m. EST	Tom Mertz 68'; Uzman Ramees 74'	Report	(yellow card) 27' William Dodzi Afawubo	Stadium: Krenzler Field; Attendance: 350; Referee: Sorin Stoica; Assistant referees: Ali Zolgharnain; Roy Miller; Fourth official: Tim Dicken

November 12, 2025	#2 Purdue Fort Wayne	2–2 (a.e.t.) (4–3 p)	#3 Green Bay	Cleveland, OH
4:00 p.m. EST	Ameer Shetiah (yellow card) 25'; Ben Hissrich (yellow card) 38'; Karsten Ternes 47'; Marcos Soria (yellow card) 76'; Shane Anderson 82'; Sep Habibi (yellow card) 110'; Christian Leon (yellow card) 110'	Report	9' (yellow card) 11' Chris Album; 17' Noah Madrigal; (yellow card) 37'; (yellow card) 61' Ty Perkins; (yellow card) 87' So Nishikawa	Stadium: Krenzler Field; Attendance: 203; Referee: Herber Estrada; Assistant referees: Eulogio Willalpando; Adrian Werbick; Fourth official: Christian Kelly
	Penalties
	Shane Anderson (penalty missed); Iann Topete (penalty scored); Karsten Ternes (penalty scored); Christian Leon (penalty scored); Angel Rodriguez (penalty scored)		(penalty scored) Chris Album; (penalty scored) Keegan Walker; (penalty missed) Noah Madrigal; (penalty missed) Noah Lechelt; (penalty scored) Jeloni Murray-Powell

=== Final ===
November 15, 2025	#1 Cleveland State	1–0 (a.e.t.)	#2 Purdue Fort Wayne	Cleveland, OH
1:00 p.m. EST	Correia 103'	Report	(yellow card) 69' Lennart Heck	Stadium: Krenzler Field; Attendance: 500; Referee: Nick Balcer; Assistant referees: Jake Brochu; Justin Tatsak; Fourth official: John Safar

== Statistics ==
=== Goalscorers ===
There were 12 goals scored in 5 matches, for an average of 2.4 goals per match.

2 goals

- Anass Hadran - Robert Morris
- Chris Album - Green Bay

1 goal

- Matteo Correia - Cleveland State
- Tom Mertz - Cleveland State
- Uzman Ramees - Cleveland State
- Noah Madrigal - Green Bay
- Jack Bretzmann - Milwaukee
- Karsten Ternes - Purdue Fort Wayne
- Shane Anderson - Purdue Fort Wayne

== All-Tournament team ==
Player	Team
**2025 Horizon Men's Soccer All-Tournament team**
**Matteo Correia**	Cleveland State
Uzman Ramees	Cleveland State
Tom Mertz	Cleveland State
Ryan Poling	Cleveland State
Chris Album	Green Bay
Noah Madrigal	Green Bay
Karsten Ternes	Purdue Fort Wayne
Shane Anderson	Purdue Fort Wayne
Andrew Hollenbach	Purdue Fort Wayne
Anass Hadran	Robert Morris
Josh Lane	Robert Morris

MVP in Bold
