= 2018 Horizon League men's soccer tournament =

- Classification: Division I
- Teams: 6
- Matches: 5
- Quarterfinals site: Aldo Santaga Stadium; OU Soccer Field; Green Bay, Wisconsin; Rochester, Michigan
- Semifinals site: Alumni Field; Dayton, Ohio
- Finals site: Alumni Field; Dayton, Ohio
- Champions: UIC (6th title)
- Winning coach: Sean Phillips (3rd title)
- MVP: Jacob Graiber (UIC)
- Broadcast: ESPN+

2018 Horizon League men's soccer standings
	Conf.					Overall
Team	W		L		T	W		L		T
Wright State	6	–	1	–	1	13	–	3	–	3
UIC ‡	5	–	2	–	1	12	–	6	–	2
Oakland	5	–	3	–	0	9	–	7	–	3
Green Bay	4	–	3	–	1	8	–	6	–	2
IUPUI	4	–	3	–	1	5	–	10	–	4
Milwaukee	3	–	4	–	1	9	–	7	–	3
Northern Kentucky	3	–	5	–	0	10	–	7	–	0
Cleveland State	1	–	4	–	3	4	–	8	–	3
Detroit Mercy	0	–	6	–	2	1	–	14	–	3
‡ – 2018 Horizon Tournament champion + – Invited to the 2018 NCAA Division I Men's Soccer Championship; As of November 30, 2018; Rankings from United Soccer Coaches

The 2018 Horizon League men's soccer tournament was the 31st edition of the tournament. The tournament will decide the Horizon League champion and guaranteed representative into the 2018 NCAA Division I Men's Soccer Championship. The tournament will be begin on November 5 and conclude on November 10.

UIC are the defending champions.

UIC successfully defended their championship, beating Wright State 3–1 in the final.

== Seeds ==
Seed	School	Conference	Tiebreaker
1	Wright State	6–1–1	
2	UIC	5–2–1	
3	Oakland	5–3–0	
4	Green Bay	4–3–1	Green Bay 1–0 vs. IUPUI
5	IUPUI	4–3–1	IUPUI 0–1 vs.Green Bay
6	Milwaukee	3–4–1	

== Bracket ==
Quarterfinals; Nov. 5
3	Oakland	0
6	Milwaukee	1
4	Green Bay	2
5	IUPUI (OT)	3

Semifinals; Nov. 8
1	Wright State (pen.)	1 (4)
6	Milwaukee	1 (3)
2	UIC (pen.)	1 (4)
5	IUPUI	1 (2)

Final; Nov. 10
1	Wright State	1
2	UIC	3

== Results ==
=== First round ===
November 5
7:00 p.m. EST

No. 3 Oakland	0–1	No. 6 Milwaukee
	Report	Latinovich 54'

Oakland Soccer Field
Rochester, Michigan
Attendance: 155
Referee: Art Arustamyan

November 5
8:00 p.m. EST

No. 4 Green Bay	2–3 (a.e.t.)	No. 5 IUPUI
Carreon 38'; Mansa 81'	Report	Goede 15'; Siasia 25'; Souza 97'

Aldo Santaga Stadium
Green Bay, Wisconsin
Attendance: 338
Referee: Jorge Cuate

=== Semifinals ===
November 8
4:00 p.m. EST

No. 2 UIC	1–1 (a.e.t.)	No. 5 IUPUI
González 80'	Report	Siasia 57'
Penalties
Todd (penalty scored); Pérez (penalty scored); Ash (penalty scored); Moore (penalty scored)	4–2	(penalty scored) Aguilar; (penalty missed) Patacca; (penalty scored) Zampieri; (penalty missed) Goede

Alumni Field
Dayton, Ohio
Attendance: 182
Referee: Michael Allie

November 8
7:00 p.m. EST

No. 1 Wright State	1–1 (a.e.t.)	No. 6 Milwaukee
Corfe 37'	Report	Conway 64'
Penalties
(penalty missed) Suad Suljic; (penalty missed) Henrik Fennefoss; (penalty scored) Vuk Latinovich; (penalty scored) Sean Holmes; (penalty scored) Evan Conway	4–3	(penalty scored) Deri Corfe; (penalty scored) Stefan Rokvic; (penalty scored) Harvey Slade; (penalty missed) Dan Bent; (penalty scored) Jackson Dietrich

Alumni Field
Dayton, Ohio
Attendance: 392
Referee: Josh Kelly

=== Final ===
November 10
6:00 p.m. EST

No. 1 Wright State	1–3	No. 2 UIC
Tajak Dominik 81'	Report	4', 88' Josiah Ash; 35' Pau Mateo

Alumni Field
Dayton, Ohio
Attendance: 623
Referee: Calin Radosav

== Statistics ==
=== Goals ===
Rank	Player	College	Goals
1	Josiah Ash	UIC	2
1	Sean Siasia	IUPUI	2
2	Michael Carreon	Green Bay	1
2	Deri Corfe	Wright State	1
2	Evan Conway	Milwaukee	1
2	Tajak Dominik	Wright State	1
2	Corey Goede	IUPUI	1
2	Óscar González	UIC	1
2	Vuk Latinovich	Milwaukee	1
2	Adam Mansa	Green Bay	1
2	Pau Mateo	UIC	1
2	Yan Souza	IUPUI	1

== All Tournament Team ==
**2018 Horizon League Men's Soccer All-Tournament team**
- **Jacob Graiber, UIC**
- Josiah Ash, UIC
- Nestor Garcia, UIC
- Oscar Gonzalez, UIC
- Deri Corfe, Wright State
- Harvey Slade, Wright State
- Joel Sundell, Wright State
- Alan Aguilar, IUPUI
- Sean Siasia, IUPUI
- Evan Conway, Milwaukee
- Vuk Latinovich, Milwaukee
MVP in Bold
