= 2021 Horizon League men's soccer tournament =

- Classification: Division I
- Teams: 6
- Matches: 5
- Attendance: 1,198
- Site: Oakland Soccer Field; Rochester, Michigan (Semifinals & Final)
- Champions: Oakland (3rd title)
- Winning coach: Eric Pogue (3rd title)
- MVP: Noah Jensen (Oakland)
- Broadcast: ESPN+

2021 Horizon League men's soccer standings
	Conf.					Overall
Team	W		L		T	W		L		T
Oakland ‡	8	–	1	–	1	12	–	7	–	2
Cleveland State	8	–	2	–	0	10	–	8	–	0
Milwaukee	6	–	3	–	1	9	–	8	–	1
UIC	6	–	4	–	0	9	–	8	–	2
Detroit Mercy	4	–	3	–	3	5	–	7	–	5
Wright State	4	–	5	–	1	5	–	10	–	1
Robert Morris	4	–	5	–	1	5	–	11	–	1
Northern Kentucky	4	–	6	–	0	6	–	11	–	0
Purdue Fort Wayne	3	–	6	–	1	5	–	9	–	2
IUPUI	2	–	8	–	0	3	–	12	–	1
Green Bay	1	–	7	–	2	2	–	10	–	4
‡ – 2021 Horizon Tournament champion + – At-large invitation to the 2021 NCAA tournament; As of December 14, 2021; Rankings from United Soccer Coaches; Source: Horizon

The 2021 Horizon League men's soccer tournament was the postseason men's soccer tournament for the Horizon League. It was held from November 7 through November 13, 2021. The quarterfinals of the tournament were held at campus sites, while semifinals and final took place at Oakland Soccer Field in Rochester, Michigan. The six team single-elimination tournament consisted of three rounds based on seeding from regular season conference play. The Milwaukee Panthers were the defending champions. They were unable to defend their crown, falling to Cleveland State in the Semifinals. Oakland finished as tournament champions after defeating Cleveland State 3–1 in the Final. This was the third overall title for Oakland, all of which have come under head coach Eric Pogue. As tournament champions, Oakland earned the Horizon League's automatic berth into the 2021 NCAA Division I men's soccer tournament.

== Seeding ==
Six Horizon League schools participated in the tournament. Teams were seeded by conference record. The top two seeds received byes to the Semifinals and the number one seed hosted the Semifinals and Final. A tiebreaker was required to determine the sixth and final seed of the tournament as Robert Morris and Wright State both finished with 4–5–1 conference records. Robert Morris earned the sixth seed by virtue of their 2–1 win over Wright State on October 2.

Seed	School	Conference Record	Points
1	Oakland	8–1–1	25
2	Cleveland State	8–2–0	24
3	Milwaukee	6–3–1	19
4	UIC	6–4–0	18
5	Detroit Mercy	4–3–3	15
6	Robert Morris	4–5–1	13

== Bracket ==
Quarterfinals; Monday, Nov. 7
4	UIC (a.e.t.)	2
5	Detroit Mercy	1
3	Milwaukee	1
6	Robert Morris	0

Semifinals; Thursday, Nov. 11
1	Oakland	3
4	UIC	1
2	Cleveland State	2
3	Milwaukee	1

Final; Saturday, Nov. 13
1	Oakland	3
2	Cleveland State	1

== Schedule ==
=== Quarterfinals ===
November 7, 2021	#3 Milwaukee	1–0	#6 Robert Morris	Milwaukee, WI
1:00 p.m. ET	Raul Medina (yellow card) 68'; Paolo Gratton 86'	Report		Stadium: Engelmann Field; Attendance: 191; Referee: Michael Allie; Assistant referees: Gary Klump; Christian Little; Fourth official: Alex Hoefstetter

November 7, 2021	#4 UIC	2–1 (a.e.t.)	#5 Detroit Mercy	Chicago, IL
1:00 p.m. ET	Bukola Abdulwahab 4'; Pau Mateo 105'	Report	(yellow card) 10' Daniel Iyok; 71' (pen.), (yellow card) 90' Kyle Bandyk	Stadium: Flames Field; Attendance: 433; Referee: Kevin Fikar; Assistant referees: Vitali Hantsevich; James Duling; Fourth official: Kevin Cavalcanti

=== Semifinals ===
November 11, 2021	#1 Oakland	3–1	#4 UIC	Rochester, MI
1:00 p.m. ET	Noah Jensen 19', 72' (pen.); Mikey Ketteman 69' (pen.); Charlie Braithwaite (yellow card) 81'	Report	64' Eduardo Garcia; (yellow card) 72' Manny Cerritos	Stadium: Oakland Soccer Field; Attendance: 0 Referee: Michael Allie; Assistant referees: Quinton McFarlen; Shane Richards; Fourth official: Ted Grigorou

November 11, 2021	#2 Cleveland State	2–1	#3 Milwaukee	Rochester, MI
4:00 p.m. ET	Team (yellow card) 18'; Thomas M'Barek (yellow card) 45'; Albert Portas 50', (yellow card) 59'; Andrew Nicholas 57'	Report	29' Paolo Gratton; (yellow card) 48' Andreas Soerensen; (yellow card) 58' Shawn Azcueta; (red card) 74' Team	Stadium: Oakland Soccer Field; Attendance: 0 Referee: Heber Estrada; Assistant referees: Christian Little; Jacob Little; Fourth official: Ted Grigorou

=== Final ===
November 13, 2021	#1 Oakland	3–1	#2 Cleveland State	Rochester, MI
1:00 p.m. ET	Noah Jensen 1'; Charlie Braithwaite (yellow card) 17'; Sebastian Nuzzo 42'; Dylan Borczak 48'; Mikey Ketteman (yellow card) 90'	Report	(yellow card) 11' Saahb Kular; (yellow card) 18' Cameron Wilde; 41' Pablo Kawecki; (yellow card) 58' Albert Portas; (yellow card) 89' Ryan Kolonick	Stadium: Oakland Soccer Field; Attendance: 574; Referee: Dimitrios Katsimingos; Assistant referees: Khalaf Al-Latayfeh; Eulogio Villalpando; Fourth official: Michael Allie

== Statistics ==
=== Goalscorers ===
There were 15 goals scored in 5 matches, for an average of 3 goals per match (as of November 13, 2021).

3 goals

- Noah Jensen – Oakland

2 goals

- Paolo Gratton – Milwaukee

1 goal

- Pablo Kawecki – Cleveland State
- Andrew Nicholas – Cleveland State
- Albert Portas – Cleveland State
- Kyle Bandyk – Detroit Mercy
- Dylan Borczak – Oakland
- Mikey Ketteman – Oakland
- Sebastian Nuzzo – Oakland
- Bukola Abdulwahab – UIC
- Eduardo Garica – UIC
- Pau Mateo – UIC

== All-Tournament team ==
Player	Team
**Noah Jensen**	Oakland
Finn Jurak	Oakland
Adam McAleenan	Oakland
Kieran Hayes	Oakland
Thomas M'Barek	Cleveland State
Jannis Schmidt	Cleveland State
Pablo Kawecki	Cleveland State
Paolo Gratton	Milwaukee
Shawn Azcueta	Milwaukee
Eduardo Garcia	UIC
Christian Crespo	UIC

MVP in bold
