= 2017 Horizon League men's soccer tournament =

- Classification: Division I
- Teams: 6
- Matches: 5
- Site: Flames Field; Chicago, Illinois
- Champions: UIC (6th title)
- Winning coach: Sean Phillips (3rd title)
- Broadcast: HLTV, ESPN3

2017 Horizon League men's soccer standings
	Conf.					Overall
Team	W		L		T	W		L		T
Green Bay	7	–	1	–	1	9	–	5	–	3
UIC ‡	6	–	2	–	1	11	–	6	–	3
Milwaukee	6	–	3	–	0	10	–	5	–	4
Wright State	6	–	3	–	0	10	–	7	–	1
Cleveland State	4	–	3	–	2	7	–	10	–	2
Detroit	4	–	4	–	1	7	–	8	–	4
Northern Kentucky	3	–	4	–	2	7	–	6	–	4
Oakland	3	–	5	–	1	6	–	10	–	1
Belmont	2	–	7	–	0	5	–	9	–	2
IUPUI	0	–	9	–	0	0	–	15	–	2
‡ – 2017 Horizon Tournament champion + – Invited to the 2017 NCAA Division I Men's Soccer Championship; As of November 17, 2017; Rankings from United Soccer Coaches

The 2017 Horizon League men's soccer tournament was the 30th edition of the competition. The tournament determined the year's Horizon League men's college soccer champion, as well as the conference's automatic berth in the 2017 NCAA Division I men's soccer tournament, which determines the national champion of college soccer for the season.

Two-time defending tournament champions, the UIC Flames, won their third-consecutive Horizon League title, and their sixth overall, defeating the regular season champions, Green Bay Phoenix in the final. UIC earned a berth into the NCAA Tournament, where they lost in the first round of the tournament, 1-4 to the Wisconsin Badgers. No other teams in the conference earned an at-large berth into the tournament.

== Background ==
Six teams participated in the tournament, and they were seeded based on their regular season conference record, or matches against other college soccer programs also in the conference. The Horizon League regular season winner and runner-up earned byes to the semifinal round of the tournament as the top two seeds, while the se

== Seeding ==
Seed	School	Conference record							Pts.	Pct.	Tiebreaker
Seed	School	Pld.	W	L	T	GF	GA	GD	Pts.	Pct.	Tiebreaker
1	Green Bay	9	7	1	1	x	x	x	22	0.833	
2	UIC	9	6	2	1	x	x	x	19	0.722	
3	Milwaukee	9	6	3	0	18	11	+7	18	0.667	1–0 vs. WSU
4	Wright State	9	6	3	0	x	x	x	18	0.667	0–1 vs. MKE
5	Cleveland State	9	4	3	2	x	x	x	14	0.556	
6	Detroit	9	4	4	1	x	x	x	13	0.500	

== Schedule ==
Game	Time	Matchup	Score	Television
First round – Monday, November 6
1	7:00 pm	No. 4 Wright State vs. No. 5 Cleveland State	0–4	ESPN3
2	7:00 pm	No. 3 Milwaukee vs. No. 6 Detroit	2–2 ^{4–5 PK}	ESPN3
Semifinals – Thursday, November 9
3	4:00 pm	No. 1 Green Bay vs. No. 6 Detroit	3–1	ESPN3
4	7:00 pm	No. 2 UIC vs. No. 5 Cleveland State	3–1	ESPN3
Championship – Saturday, November 11
5	7:00 pm	No. 1 Green Bay vs. No. 2 UIC	0–2	ESPN3

== Bracket ==
Quarterfinals
4	Wright State	0
5	Cleveland State	4
3	Milwaukee	2 (4)
6	Detroit (pen.)	2 (5)

Semifinals
2	UIC	3
5	Cleveland State	1
1	Green Bay	3
6	Detroit	1

Championship
2	UIC	2
1	Green Bay	0

== Awards and honors ==
- MVP: Joel Leon, UIC

=== All Tournament Team ===
**Horizon League Men's Soccer All-Tournament team**

**Joel Leon, UIC**
Makell Saddler, UIC
Jesus Perez, UIC
Max Todd, UIC
Audi Jepson, Green Bay
Tomer Zloczower, Green Bay
Adam Mansa, Green Bay
Noah Pio, Cleveland State
Antonio Burgoa, Cleveland State
Dalton Amez, Detroit Mercy
Kyle Bandyk, Detroit Mercy

MVP in Bold

== See also ==
- 2017 Horizon League Women's Soccer Tournament
