= 2022 Horizon League men's soccer tournament =

- Classification: Division I
- Teams: 6
- Matches: 5
- Attendance: 2,080
- Site: Krenzler Field; Cleveland, Ohio (Semifinals & Final)
- Champions: Cleveland State (2nd title)
- Winning coach: Siniša Ubiparipović (1st title)
- MVP: Jannis Schmidt (Cleveland State)
- Broadcast: ESPN+

2022 Horizon League men's soccer standings
	Conf.					Overall
Team	W		L		T	W		L		T
Cleveland State‡	5	–	1	–	3	11	–	4	–	5
Wright State	4	–	1	–	4	4	–	7	–	6
IUPUI	4	–	2	–	3	7	–	7	–	6
Oakland	4	–	2	–	3	4	–	10	–	5
Robert Morris	4	–	3	–	2	6	–	7	–	3
Detroit Mercy	3	–	2	–	4	4	–	7	–	6
Green Bay	2	–	2	–	5	6	–	3	–	7
Northern Kentucky	2	–	6	–	1	4	–	11	–	2
Milwaukee	0	–	4	–	5	1	–	8	–	8
Purdue Fort Wayne	1	–	6	–	2	2	–	10	–	3
‡ – 2022 Horizon Tournament champion + – At-large invitation to the 2022 NCAA Tournament; As of December 13, 2022; Rankings from United Soccer Coaches; Source: Horizon

The 2022 Horizon League men's soccer tournament was the postseason men's soccer tournament for the Horizon League. It was held from November 6 through November 12, 2022. The quarterfinals of the tournament were held at campus sites, while semifinals and final took place at Krenzler Field in Cleveland, Ohio. The six team single-elimination tournament consisted of three rounds based on seeding from regular season conference play. The Oakland Grizzlies were the defending champions. They were unable to defend their crown, falling to Cleveland State in the Semifinals. Cleveland State would finish as tournament champions after defeating IUPUI 3–0 in the Final. This was the second overall title for Cleveland State and first for head coach Siniša Ubiparipović. As tournament champions, Cleveland State earned the Horizon League's automatic berth into the 2022 NCAA Division I men's soccer tournament.

== Seeding ==
Six Horizon League schools participated in the tournament. Teams were seeded by conference record. The top two seeds received byes to the Semifinals and the number one seed hosted the Semifinals and Final. A tiebreaker was required to determine the third and fourth seeds as IUPUI and Oakland both finished with identical 4–2–3 conference records. IUPUI earned the third seed by virtue of their 4–2 regular season win over Oakland on October 22.

Seed	School	Conference Record	Points
1	Cleveland State	5–1–3	18
2	Wright State	4–1–4	16
3	IUPUI	4–2–3	15
4	Oakland	4–2–3	15
5	Robert Morris	4–3–2	14
6	Detroit Mercy	3–2–4	10

== Bracket ==
Quarterfinals; Sunday, Nov. 6
4	Oakland (pen.)	2 (6)
5	Robert Morris	2 (5)
3	IUPUI	1
6	Detroit Mercy	0

Semifinals; Thursday, Nov. 10
1	Cleveland State	4
4	Oakland	2
2	Wright State	0
3	IUPUI	3

Final; Saturday, Nov. 12
1	Cleveland State	3
3	IUPUI	0

== Schedule ==
=== Quarterfinals ===
November 6	#3 IUPUI	1–0	#6 Detroit Mercy	Indianapolis, IN
1:00 p.m. ET	Lukas Hackaa 72' (pen.); Josemir Gomez (yellow card) 79'; Medard Mikobi (yellow card) 90'	Report	(yellow card) 55' Bennett Brooks; (yellow card) 86' Rocco Galati	Stadium: Carroll Stadium; Attendance: 237; Referee: Kevin Fikar; Assistant referees: Michael Nickerson; Aaron Mitchell; Fourth official: Aaron Rawlins

November 6	#4 Oakland	2–2 (a.e.t.) (6–5 p)	#5 Robert Morris	Rochester, MI
1:00 p.m. ET	Gabriel Baylon 69'; Charlie Retzer 96'; Owen Smith (yellow card) 99'; Sebastian Nuzzo (yellow card) 106'	Report	9' Chase Gilley; (red card) 17' William Dodzi Afawubo; (yellow card) 71' Anass Hadran; (yellow card) 90' Gabe Norris; (yellow card) 99' Charlie Lawrence; 106' Lucas Shearer	Stadium: Oakland Soccer Field; Attendance: 410; Referee: Michael Allie; Assistant referees: Jacob Little; Christian Little; Fourth official: David Eerline
	Penalties
	Kieran Hayes (penalty missed); Micah Sonnenberg (penalty scored); Kai Garvey (penalty scored); Ahmad Hamad (penalty missed); Owen Smith (penalty scored); Ville Ahola (penalty scored); Dawsun Schrum (penalty missed); Charlie Retzer (penalty scored); Jack Klomparens (penalty scored)		(penalty missed) Chase Gilly; (penalty scored) Hugo Kadima; (penalty scored) Owen Jowett; (penalty scored) Shane McMillan; (penalty missed) Bryan Akongo; (penalty scored) Preston Rushmore; (penalty missed) Connor Hain; (penalty scored) Lucas Shearer; (penalty missed) Jacob Haskins

=== Semifinals ===
November 10	#1 Cleveland State	4–2	#4 Oakland	Cleveland, OH
1:00 p.m. ET	Albert Portas 7'; Pablo Kawecki 58'; Bojan Kolevski 73', 79'; Jannis Schmidt (yellow card) 75'	Report	19' Gabriel Baylon; 42' Charlie Retzer; (yellow card) 58' Ried Sporat	Stadium: Krenzler Field; Attendance: 650; Referee: Heber Estrada; Assistant referees: Quinton McFarlen; Khalaf Al-Latayfeh; Fourth official: Sorin Stoica

November 10	#2 Wright State	0–3	#3 IUPUI	Cleveland, OH
4:00 p.m. ET	Brady Shapiro (yellow card) 15'; Jacob Adams (yellow card) 74'; Coen Wilson (yellow card) 85'; Cole Werthmuller (yellow card) 88'	Report	(yellow card) 14' Tyler Gainer; 40' Caleb Hussain; (yellow card) 46' Kade Tepe; (yellow card) 73' Brady Horn; 60' Lucas Hackaa; 75' Logan Finnegan; (yellow card) 89' Ethan Vermillion	Stadium: Krenzler Field; Attendance: 404; Referee: Nicholas Baker; Assistant referees: Jason White; Justin Tasak; Fourth official: Tim Dicken

=== Final ===
November 12	#1 Cleveland State	3–0	#3 IUPUI	Cleveland, OH
1:00 p.m. ET	Albert Portas 28'; Jannis Schmidt 57'; Team (yellow card) 60'; Pablo Kawecki (yellow card) 64', (goal) 73'; Jaume Rubio (yellow card) 76'	Report	(yellow card) 59' Luckas Hackaa; (yellow card) 75' Logan Finnegan	Stadium: Krenzler Field; Attendance: 379; Referee: Calin Radosav; Assistant referees: Eulogio Villapando; Adam Herges; Fourth official: Ali Zolgharnain

== Statistics ==
=== Goalscorers ===
There were 17 goals scored in 5 matches, for an average of 3.4 goals per match (as of November 12, 2022).

2 goals

- Pablo Kawecki – Cleveland State
- Bojan Kolevski – Cleveland State
- Albert Portas – Cleveland State
- Lukas Hackaa – IUPUI
- Gabriel Baylon – Oakland
- Charlie Retzer – Oakland

1 goal

- Jannis Schmidt – Cleveland State
- Logan Finnegan – IUPUI
- Caleb Hussain – IUPUI
- Chase Gilley – Robert Morris
- Lucas Shearer – Robert Morris

== All-Tournament team ==
Player	Team
**Jannis Schmidt**	Cleveland State
Pablo Kawecki	Cleveland State
Bojan Kolevski	Cleveland State
Albert Portas	Cleveland State
Logan Finnegan	IUPUI
Lukas Hackaa	IUPUI
Lucas Morefield	IUPUI
Gabriel Baylon	Oakland
Charlie Retzer	Oakland
Joe Kouadio	Wright State
Brock Pickett	Wright State

MVP in bold
