= 2024 Horizon League men's soccer tournament =

- Classification: Division I
- Teams: 6
- Matches: 5
- Attendance: 1,082
- Site: Oakland Soccer Field; Rochester, Michigan (Semifinals & Final)
- Champions: Robert Morris (1st title)
- Winning coach: Jonathan Potter (1st title)
- MVP: Chase Gilley (Robert Morris)
- Broadcast: ESPN+

2024 Horizon League men's soccer standings
	Conf.					Overall
Team	W		L		T	W		L		T
Oakland	6	–	1	–	2	9	–	7	–	2
Robert Morris ‡	4	–	3	–	2	9	–	7	–	3
Milwaukee	4	–	3	–	2	9	–	5	–	5
Green Bay	4	–	3	–	2	11	–	7	–	2
Cleveland State	4	–	4	–	1	7	–	7	–	3
Purdue Fort Wayne	4	–	4	–	1	7	–	7	–	2
Detroit Mercy	2	–	3	–	4	3	–	10	–	4
Wright State	3	–	5	–	1	7	–	9	–	2
Northern Kentucky	2	–	3	–	4	3	–	6	–	7
IU Indy	2	–	6	–	1	5	–	9	–	3
‡ – 2024 Horizon tournament champion + – At-large invitation to the 2024 NCAA tournament; As of December 17, 2024; Rankings from United Soccer Coaches; Source: Horizon

The 2024 Horizon League men's soccer tournament was the postseason men's soccer tournament for the Horizon League. It was held from November 10 through November 16, 2024. The quarterfinals of the tournament were held at campus sites, while semifinals and final took place at Oakland Soccer Field in Rochester, Michigan. The six team single-elimination tournament consisted of three rounds based on seeding from regular season conference play. The Green Bay Phoenix were the defending champions. They were unable to defend their crown. They were the fourth seed, and lost to first seed Oakland in the Semifinals. Robert Morris would finish as tournament champions after defeating top seed Oakland 1–0 in the Final. This was the first Horizon League title for Robert Morris and first for head coach Jonathan Potter. It was the fourth overall title for Robert Morris, as the program won three titles in the Northeast Conference. As tournament champions, Robert Morris earned the Horizon League's automatic berth into the 2024 NCAA Division I men's soccer tournament.

== Seeding ==
Six Horizon League schools participated in the 2024 tournament. Teams were seeded by conference record. The top two seeds received byes to the Semifinals and the number one seed hosted the Semifinals and Final. A tiebreaker was required to resolve a three-way tie between Green Bay, Milwaukee, and Robert Morris for the second, third, and fourth seeds, as all teams finished with identical 4–3–2 regular season records. Robert Morris defeated both Milwaukee and Green Bay during the regular season on September 28, and October 20, respectively. Therefore Robert Morris earned the second seed and a bye into the Semifinals. Green Bay and Milwaukee drew their regular season match-up 1–1. Milwaukee finished with a goal differential of +5 while Green Bay finished with a goal differential of 0. Milwaukee earned the third seed while Green Bay was the fourth seed. Another tiebreaker was required as Cleveland State and Purdue Fort Wayne both finished with identical 4–4–1 regular season records. Cleveland State defeated Purdue Fort Wayne 3–0 on October 26, and was therefore the fifth seed.

Seed	School	Conference Record	Points
1	Oakland	6–1–2	20
2	Robert Morris	4–3–2	14
3	Milwaukee	4–3–2	14
4	Green Bay	4–3–2	14
5	Cleveland State	4–4–1	13
6	Purdue Fort Wayne	4–4–1	13

== Bracket ==
Quarterfinals; Sunday, Nov. 5
4	Green Bay	3
5	Cleveland State	1
3	Milwaukee	1
6	Purdue Fort Wayne	0

Semifinals; Thursday, Nov. 9
1	Oakland	2
4	Green Bay	0
2	Robert Morris	1
3	Milwaukee	0

Final; Saturday, Nov. 11
1	Oakland	0
2	Robert Morris	1

== Schedule ==
=== Quarterfinals ===
November 10, 2024	#3 Milwaukee	1–0	#6 Purdue Fort Wayne	Milwaukee, WI
1:00 p.m. CST	Daiki Kumakawa 73'	Report	(yellow card) 77' Juan Romero; (yellow card) 83' Abe Arellano	Stadium: Engelmann Stadium; Attendance: 423; Referee: Donovan Noocha; Assistant referees: Justin Tatsak; Sean West; Fourth official: Nikola Stancevic

November 10, 2024	#4 Green Bay	3–1	#5 Cleveland State	Green Bay, WI
1:00 p.m. CST	Luke Nicholson 14', (yellow card) 74'; Andrew Paolucci 34', (yellow card) 81'; Myles Sophanavong 50'; Jesus Glavan-Garica (yellow card) 69'	Report	(yellow card) 54' Bojan Kolevski; 77' Caleb Trowbridge; (yellow card) 81' Marko Rimac	Stadium: Aldo Santaga Stadium; Attendance: 224; Referee: Eulogio Villalpando; Assistant referees: John Kennedy; Simeon Petrov; Fourth official: David Irwin

=== Semifinals ===
November 14, 2024	#1 Oakland	1–0	#4 Green Bay	Rochester, MI
1:00 p.m. EST	Jayden Pinheiro (yellow card) 22', (goal) 47'; Harry Phantis (red card) 64'	Report	(yellow card) 87' Tommy Coughlin	Stadium: Oakland Soccer Field; Attendance: 106; Referee: Nicholas Balcer; Assistant referees: Aaron Scherer; Rob Ruta; Fourth official: David Eberline

November 14, 2024	#2 Robert Morris	1–0	#3 Milwaukee	Rochester, MI
4:00 p.m. EST	Kai McLoughlin (yellow card) 22'; Lucas Barsoee (yellow card) 53'; Chase Gilley 65'; Mats Bramer (yellow card) 75'; Logan Gilley (yellow card) 85'	Report	(yellow card) 43' Mesfin Roda; (yellow card) 72' Angel Gongora	Stadium: Oakland Soccer Field; Attendance: 54; Referee: Nicholas Balcer; Assistant referees: Jacob Little; Christian Little; Fourth official: Nicole Green

=== Final ===
November 16, 2024	#1 Oakland	0–1	#2 Robert Morris	Rochester, MI
1:00 p.m. EST	Andrew Darakdjian (red card) 46'	Report	9' Victor Thompson Jr.; (yellow card) 50' Mats Bramer; (yellow card) 90' Logan Gilley	Stadium: Oakland Soccer Field; Attendance: 275; Referee: Dimitrios Katsamingos; Assistant referees: Leo Mora; Jas Zahirovic; Fourth official: Donovan Noocha

== Statistics ==
=== Goalscorers ===
There were 8 goals scored in 5 matches, for an average of 1.6 goals per match (as of November 16, 2024).

1 goal

- Chase Gilley – Robert Morris
- Daiki Kumakawa – Milwaukee
- Luke Nicholson – Green Bay
- Andrew Paolucci – Green Bay
- Jayden Pinheiro – Oakland
- Myles Sophanavong – Green Bay
- Victor Thompson Jr. – Milwaukee
- Caleb Trowbridge – Cleveland State

== All-Tournament team ==
Player	Team
Josh Johansen	Green Bay
Myles Sophanavong	Green Bay
David Cox	Milwaukee
Daniel Ibarra	Milwaukee
Carson Ballagh	Oakland
Andrew Darakdjian	Oakland
Alex Flowers	Oakland
**Chase Gilley**	Robert Morris
Joshua Lane	Robert Morris
Kai McLoughlin	Robert Morris
Fabian Overkamp	Robert Morris

MVP in bold
