= 2023 Horizon League men's soccer tournament =

- Classification: Division I
- Teams: 6
- Matches: 5
- Attendance: 1,387
- Site: Oakland Soccer Field; Rochester, Michigan (Semifinals & Final)
- Champions: Green Bay (2nd title)
- Winning coach: Jeremy Bonomo (1st title)
- MVP: Keegan Walker (Green Bay)
- Broadcast: ESPN+

2023 Horizon League men's soccer standings
	Conf.					Overall
Team	W		L		T	W		L		T
Oakland	6	–	3	–	0	8	–	9	–	2
Green Bay ‡	5	–	2	–	2	10	–	4	–	5
IUPUI	4	–	2	–	3	7	–	7	–	5
Detroit Mercy	4	–	3	–	2	5	–	10	–	3
Purdue Fort Wayne	3	–	3	–	3	7	–	6	–	4
Wright State	3	–	4	–	2	4	–	9	–	5
Robert Morris	3	–	4	–	2	5	–	6	–	5
Cleveland State	2	–	3	–	4	3	–	8	–	5
Northern Kentucky	3	–	6	–	0	4	–	10	–	3
Milwaukee	2	–	5	–	2	4	–	9	–	4
‡ – 2023 Horizon tournament champion + – At-large invitation to the 2023 NCAA tournament; As of December 12, 2023; Rankings from United Soccer Coaches; Source: Horizon

The 2023 Horizon League men's soccer tournament was the postseason men's soccer tournament for the Horizon League. It was held from November 5 through November 11, 2023. The quarterfinals of the tournament were held at campus sites, while semifinals and final took place at Oakland Soccer Field in Rochester, Michigan. The six team single-elimination tournament consisted of three rounds based on seeding from regular season conference play. The Cleveland State Vikings were the defending champions. They were unable to defend their crown, as they didn't qualify for the tournament with their eighth place regular season finish. Green Bay would finish as tournament champions after defeating top seed Oakland 1–0 in the Final. This was the second overall title for Green Bay and first for head coach Jeremy Bonomo. As tournament champions, Green Bay earned the Horizon League's automatic berth into the 2023 NCAA Division I men's soccer tournament.

== Seeding ==
Six Horizon League schools participated in the tournament. Teams were seeded by conference record. The top two seeds received byes to the Semifinals and the number one seed hosted the Semifinals and Final. A tiebreaker was required to determine the sixth seed as Robert Morris and Wright State finished the regular season with identical 3–4–2 regular season records. The two teams played to a 1–1 draw on October 7 in their regular season match up. Both teams lost to top seed Oakland, so record versus the second seed, Green Bay, was the third tiebreaker. Robert Morris drew with Green Bay 1–1 and Wright State defeated Green Bay 2–0 and therefore was the sixth seed. Robert Morris was the seventh seed and did not qualify for the tournament.

Seed	School	Conference Record	Points
1	Oakland	6–3–0	18
2	Green Bay	5–2–2	17
3	IUPUI	4–2–3	15
4	Detroit Mercy	4–3–2	14
5	Purdue Fort Wayne	3–3–3	12
6	Wright State	3–4–2	11

== Bracket ==
Quarterfinals; Sunday, Nov. 5
4	Detroit Mercy	0
5	Purdue Fort Wayne	1
3	IUPUI	1
6	Wright State	0

Semifinals; Thursday, Nov. 9
1	Oakland	1
5	Purdue Fort Wayne	0
2	Green Bay	2
3	IUPUI	1

Final; Saturday, Nov. 11
1	Oakland	0
2	Green Bay	1

== Schedule ==
=== Quarterfinals ===
November 5	#3 IUPUI	1–0	#6 Wright State	Indianapolis, IN
1:00 p.m. ET	Dominic Breidenbach (yellow card) 23'; Kenshiro Yamaguchi 41'; Gjis Velings (yellow card) 81'	Report	(yellow card) 19' Jacob Adams; (yellow card) 44' Chris Geddis; (yellow card) 83' Cole Werthmuller	Stadium: Carroll Stadium; Attendance: 254; Referee: Nick Balcer; Assistant referees: Justin Tatsak; Christian Little; Fourth official: Brian Alvarez

November 5	#4 Detroit Mercy	0–1	#5 Purdue Fort Wayne	Detroit, MI
1:00 p.m. ET	Marco Navarro (yellow card) 69'	Report	(yellow card) 27' Clayton Lafayette; (yellow card) 66' Saeid Jannoun; 67' Marco Valencia	Stadium: Titan Field; Attendance: 430; Referee: Donovan Noocha; Assistant referees: Jacob Little; Steve Seward; Fourth official: Eshan Varzidehkartehrani

=== Semifinals ===
November 9	#1 Oakland	1–0	#5 Purdue Fort Wayne	Rochester, MI
1:00 p.m. ET	Ville Ahloa (yellow card) 14'; Owen Smith 25'; Micah Sonnenberg (yellow card) 64'; Marco Mazzei (yellow card) 76'	Report	(yellow card) 17' Daniel Tareke; (yellow card) 62' Marc Rodriguez; (yellow card) 63' Luke Morrell; (yellow card) 63' Adam Hunt; (yellow card) 73' Juan Romero	Stadium: Oakland Soccer Field; Attendance: 259; Referee: Calin Radosav; Assistant referees: Eulogio Villalpando; Adam Herges; Fourth official: Steve Besk

November 9	#2 Green Bay	2–1	#3 IUPUI	Rochester, MI
4:00 p.m. ET	Chris Album (yellow card) 21'; Luca Contestabile (yellow card) 22'; Keegan Walker 33'; Andrew Paolucci 41'	Report	(yellow card) 40' Josemir Gomez; 66' Logan Finnegan; (yellow card) 68' Ethan Vermillion	Stadium: Oakland Soccer Field; Attendance: 64; Referee: Dimitrios Kastimingos; Assistant referees: Art Arustamyan; Khalaf Al-Latayefh Malkawi; Fourth official: Steve Besk

=== Final ===
November 11	#1 Oakland	0–1	#2 Green Bay	Rochester, MI
1:00 p.m. ET	Sebastian Nuzzo (yellow card) 89'	Report	25', (yellow card) 47' Chris Album; (yellow card) 75' Hesron Barry	Stadium: Oakland Soccer Field; Attendance: 380; Referee: Sorin Stoica; Assistant referees: Ali Zolgharnain; Vincent Ragone; Fourth official: Steve Besk

== Statistics ==
=== Goalscorers ===
There were 7 goals scored in 5 matches, for an average of 1.4 goals per match (as of November 11, 2023).

1 goal

- Chris Album – Green Bay
- Andrew Paolucci – Green Bay
- Keegan Walker – Green Bay
- Logan Finnegan – IUPUI
- Kenshiro Yamaguchi – IUPUI
- Owen Smith – Oakland
- Marco Valencia – Purdue Fort Wayne

== All-Tournament team ==
Player	Team
Chris Album	Green Bay
Rohin Kapila	Green Bay
Christoph Schurz	Green Bay
**Keegan Walker**	Green Bay
Josemir Gomez	IUPUI
Lukas Hackaa	IUPUI
Carson Ballagh	Oakland
Marco Mazzei	Oakland
Owen Smith	Oakland
Max Collingwood	Purdue Fort Wayne
Juan Romero	Purdue Fort Wayne

MVP in bold
