= Donavan Phillip =

Saint Lucian footballer (born 2005)

Personal information
- Date of birth: 4 January 2005 (age 21)
- Place of birth: Castries, Saint Lucia
- Height: 1.88 m (6 ft 2 in)
- Position: Forward

Team information
- Current team: Colorado Rapids
- Number: 32

College career
Years	Team	Apps	(Gls)
2023–2024	Oakland Golden Grizzlies	19	(5)
2024–2025	NC State Wolfpack	41	(25)

Senior career*
Years	Team	Apps	(Gls)
2022–2023	B1 FC	9	(2)
2024	Kalamazoo FC	14	(9)
2025	Flint City Bucks	12	(12)
2026–	Colorado Rapids	8	(2)
2026–	Colorado Rapids 2	7	(3)

International career^{‡}
2026–	Saint Lucia	2	(2)
- * Club domestic league appearances and goals as of 14:26, 27 September 2026 (UTC) ‡ National team caps and goals as of 03:13, 3 October 2026 (UTC)

Donavan Phillip (born 4 January 2005) is a Saint Lucian professional footballer who plays as a forward for Major League Soccer club Colorado Rapids.

== Club career ==
Phillip started his career in Saint Lucia as a defender and goalkeeper at age four before becoming a forward. He became interested in football in a country that prefers cricket by watching his father's professional games in Jamaica. As a youth, he played for B1 FC with the junior team and the first team in the SLFA First Division.

At age fourteen, he moved to Saltsburg, Pennsylvania in the United States to attend The Kiski School after he was offered a spot on the team. He would go on to win two national titles with the school. While playing for the school team, he also played for the Borussia Dortmund International Academy Pittsburgh and competed in the US Youth Soccer National Championships. Following graduation from the Kiski School, it was announced in April 2023 that Phillip would continue his education at Oakland University and play for its Golden Grizzlies of the NCAA Division I. At the club level, Phillip joined Kalamazoo FC of the USL League Two for the 2024 season. He scored the team's only goal in a 1–0 victory over Lansing City to open the season.

For the 2024 season, Phillip transferred to North Carolina State University to play for the Wolfpack. In December of that year, he was drafted by the Colorado Rapids in the third round (62nd overall) of the 2025 MLS SuperDraft. In doing so, he became the first Saint Lucian ever taken in the draft. He returned to North Carolina State the following season to utilize more of his college eligibility to gain more experience. For the 2025 season, he moved to the Flint City Bucks, also of USL League Two. He went on to tally twelve goals and nine assists on the season en route to becoming the league's joint top scorer and being named a member of the league's Team of the Year and the Central Conference Player of the Year. Phillip's twelve goals set a new team single-season record as the Bucks captured its third-straight Great Lakes Division title. He scored an additional six goals in five postseason matches on route to Flint City winning the Central Conference title.

During his Junior season at North Carolina State in 2025, Phillip scored a nation-best nineteen goals and was named the ACC Offensive Player of the Year. He led the Wolfpack to the NCAA College Cup final and was eventually named the 2025 MAC Hermann Trophy winner as the best college player in the nation. Despite a goal from Phillip in the NCAA Cup final, North Carolina State fell 3–2 to the Washington Huskies.

In January 2026, Phillip signed a two-year contract with the Colorado Rapids which included a club option for an additional three years.

== International career ==
Phillip competed for Saint Lucia in the 2019 CONCACAF Boys' Under-15 Championship. He received his first call up to the senior national team in March 2026 for 2026 FIFA Series matches against Azerbaijan and Oman or Sierra Leone.

=== International goals ===
No.	Date	Venue	Opponent	Score	Result	Competition
1.	27 March 2026	Sumgayit City Stadium, Sumgait, Azerbaijan	Azerbaijan	1–3	1–6	2026 FIFA Series
2.	2 October 2026	Wildey Turf, Wildey, Barbados	Guadeloupe	3–0	3–0	2026–27 CONCACAF Nations League B
Last updated 2 October 2026

=== International career statistics ===
As of match played 2 October 2026.

Saint Lucia
Year	Apps	Goals
2026	2	2
Total	2	2

== Honours ==
Flint City Bucks

- Great Lakes Division: 2025
- Central Conference: 2025

NC State Wolfpack

- NCAA Division I men's soccer tournament (runners-up): 2025

Oakland Golden Grizzlies

- Horizon League men's soccer tournament (runners-up): 2023

Individual

- Hermann Trophy: 2025
- Atlantic Coast Conference (ACC) Offensive Player of the Year: 2025
- All-ACC First Team: 2025
- NCAA Division I top goal-scorer: 2025
- United Soccer Coaches (USC) First Team All-America: 2025
- USC All-South Region First Team: 2025
- USL League Two Team of the Year: 2025
- USL League Two Central Conference Player of the Year: 2025
- USL League Two top-scorer: 2025
