= 2010 Cleveland State Vikings men's soccer team =

2010 Cleveland State Vikings men's soccer
- Conference: Horizon League
- Record: 9–10–1 (4–3–1 Horizon League)
- Head coach: Ali Kazemaini
- Home stadium: Krenzler Field

The 2009–10 Cleveland State Vikings men's soccer team represented Cleveland State University in the 2010-11 NCAA Division I men's soccer season. The team was led by fifth-year head coach Ali Kazemaini and played their home games at Krenzler Field.

== 2010 squad ==
Note: Flags indicate national team as defined under FIFA eligibility rules; some limited exceptions apply. Players may hold more than one non-FIFA nationality.

No.	Pos.	Nation	Player
0	GK	USA	Almir Suljevic
1	GK	USA	Brad Stuver
2	DF	CAN	Al James
3	DF	USA	Justin Cree
4	DF	USA	Audric Kilroy
5	DF	CAN	Aldo Maiorano
6	DF	CAN	Cameron Eisses
7	FW	USA	Jeff Baker
8	MF	USA	John Wargo
9	FW	USA	Aaron Adkins
10	FW	BIH	Admir Suljevic
11	MF	USA	Brian Donnelly

No.	Pos.	Nation	Player
12	FW	USA	Jordan Hart
13	MF	USA	Aslinn Rodas
14	DF	USA	John Gulden
15	DF	USA	Justin Mancine
16	DF	USA	Christopher Koy
17	MF	USA	John Wallace
18	FW	USA	Caleb Eastham
20	MF	USA	Tommy Fitzgerald
21	FW	USA	Matt McWilson
22	DF	CAN	Zach Ellis-Hayden
24	MF	VEN	Manuel Conde
25	FW	BIH	Milos Govedarica

== 2010 season ==
Win Tie Loss

=== Preseason Matches ===
2010-08-24	Cleveland State Vikings	1–3	#18 Ohio State Buckeyes	Columbus, Ohio
5:00 p.m.		Report		Stadium: Jesse Owens Memorial Stadium; Attendance: 213

2010-08-27	Cleveland State Vikings	0–3	Cincinnati Bearcats	Cincinnati, Ohio
7:00 p.m.		Report		Stadium: Gettler Stadium; Attendance: Unknown

=== Regular season ===
2010-09-01	Cleveland State Vikings	0–1	St. Bonaventure Bonnies	St. Bonaventure, New York
5:00 p.m.		Report		Stadium: McGraw-Jennings Field; Attendance: 215

2010-09-05	Niagara Purple Eagles	1–2	Cleveland State Vikings	Cleveland, Ohio
3:00 p.m.		Report		Stadium: Krenzler Field; Attendance: 282

2010-09-10	Cleveland State Vikings	0–4	Northwestern Wildcats	DeKalb, Illinois
12:30 p.m.		Report		Stadium: NIU Soccer & Track and Field Complex; Attendance: 86

2010-09-12	Cleveland State Vikings	0–2	Northern Illinois Huskies	DeKalb, Illinois
2:30 p.m.		Report		Stadium: NIU Soccer & Track and Field Complex; Attendance: 208

2010-09-17	Cleveland State Vikings	0–2	SIU Edwardsville Cougars	Edwardsville, Illinois
8:00 p.m.		Report		Stadium: Korte Stadium; Attendance: 1,144

2010-09-19	IPFW Mastodons	0–1	Cleveland State Vikings	Cleveland, Ohio
1:00 p.m.		Report		Stadium: Krenzler Field; Attendance: 132

2010-09-24	Cleveland State Vikings	3–2	UIC Flames	Chicago, Illinois
2:00 p.m.		Report		Attendance: 265

2010-09-26	Cleveland State Vikings	0–3	Loyola Ramblers	Chicago, Illinois
2:00 p.m.		Report		Attendance: 198

2010-10-01	Green Bay Phoenix	1–3	Cleveland State Vikings	Cleveland, Ohio
4:00 p.m.		Report		Stadium: Krenzler Field; Attendance: 138

2010-10-03	Milwaukee Panthers	1 – 0 (2 OT)	Cleveland State Vikings	Cleveland, Ohio
1:00 p.m.		Report		Stadium: Krenzler Field; Attendance: 84

2010-10-06	Pittsburgh Panthers	0–2	Cleveland State Vikings	Cleveland, Ohio
7:00 p.m.		Report		Stadium: Krenzler Field; Attendance: 117

2010-10-09	Valparaiso Crusaders	0–1	Cleveland State Vikings	Cleveland, Ohio
7:00 p.m.		Report		Stadium: Krenzler Field; Attendance: 201

2010-10-11	Buffalo Bulls	2–0	Cleveland State Vikings	Cleveland, Ohio
4:00 p.m.		Report		Stadium: Krenzler Field; Attendance: 84

2010-10-15	Cleveland State Vikings	0–2	Detroit Titans	Detroit, Michigan
4:00 p.m.		Report		Attendance: 239

2010-10-17	Cleveland State Vikings	0 – 1 (1 OT)	IUPUI Jaguars	Indianapolis, Indiana
1:00 p.m.		Report		Stadium: Carrol Stadium; Attendance: 637

2010-10-23	Wright State Raiders	1–2	Cleveland State Vikings	Cleveland, Ohio
7:00 p.m.		Report		Stadium: Krenzler Field; Attendance: 138

2010-10-30	#1 Akron Zips	1–2	Cleveland State Vikings	Cleveland, Ohio
2:00 p.m.		Report		Stadium: Krenzler Field; Attendance: 1,877

2010-11-05	Cleveland State Vikings	0 – 0 (2 OT)	#6 Butler Bulldogs	Indianapolis, Indiana
10:00 a.m.		Report		Attendance: 138

=== Horizon League tournament ===
2010-11-09	Detroit Titans	1–2	Cleveland State Vikings	Cleveland, Ohio
7:00 p.m.		Report		Stadium: Krenzler Field; Attendance: 167

2010-11-12	Cleveland State Vikings	1–2	#6 Butler Bulldogs	Indianapolis, Indiana
2:30 p.m.		Report		Attendance: 503
