= Klaas de Boer =

American soccer coach (born 1942)

Personal information
- Date of birth: January 6, 1942 (age 84)
- Place of birth: Kollum, Netherlands

Youth career
- Michigan State

Senior career*
Years	Team	Apps	(Gls)
1973	Cleveland Stars		
1974	→ Cleveland Cobras		

Managerial career
- 1972–1977: Cleveland State Vikings
- Detroit Express (assistant)
- 1979–1980: Detroit Lightning (assistant)
- 1980: Oakland Golden Grizzlies
- 1981: Los Angeles Aztecs (assistant)
- 1984–1986: Canton Invaders
- * Club domestic league appearances and goals

Klaas de Boer (born 6 January 1942) is an American retired soccer player and coach. He played professionally in the American Soccer League and was the 1977 NSCAA Coach of the Year and 1985 American Indoor Soccer Association Coach of the Year. He coached his teams to two league titles, the 1985 and 1986 AISA championships.

== Playing career ==
The son of Elisabeth Schaap and Lammert de Boer, a baker in Kollum, Friesland, De Boer immigrated with his family to the United States in 1956. De Boer attended Holland Christian High School in Holland, Michigan before entering Michigan State University. He played soccer in both high school and college. In 1973, he signed with the Cleveland Stars in the American Soccer League. At the end of the season, the Stars came under new ownership who changed the team name to the Cleveland Cobras. He played one more season in Cleveland.

== Coaching career ==
Even while playing professionally, De Boer was coaching at the collegiate level. He was hired by Cleveland State University in 1972 as head soccer coach. Over six season, he compiled a 55–25–3 record and was named the 1977 NSCAA Coach of the Year. He then served as an assistant coach with the Los Angeles Aztecs and Detroit Express of the North American Soccer League. In 1979, he was hired as an assistant coach by the expansion Detroit Lightning of the Major Indoor Soccer League. In 1984, he became a head coach with the Canton Invaders of the newly established American Indoor Soccer Association. He took the Invaders to the league championship, winning Coach of the Year honors. In his two season in Canton, he compiled a 64-16 (.800) record and won two championships. His win percentage is the highest in U.S. indoor soccer history. Today he runs the Dutch Masters Soccer School in his hometown of Holland, Michigan
