= Ali Kazemaini =

Iranian-American soccer player and coach

Personal information
- Full name: Ali R. Kazemaini
- Date of birth: June 21, 1963 (age 63)
- Place of birth: Tehran, Iran
- Height: 6 ft 0 in (1.83 m)
- Position: Forward

Youth career
- 1980–1983: Cleveland State Vikings

Senior career*
Years	Team	Apps	(Gls)
1984–1988	Cleveland Force (indoor)	144	(74)
1988–1990	Tacoma Stars (indoor)	72	(30)
1990–1991	Cleveland Crunch (indoor)	38	(2)
1991–1992	Baltimore Blast (indoor)	15	(1)
1992	North York Rockets	2	(0)
1992–1993	Canton Invaders (indoor)	29	(10)

Managerial career
- 1992–2005: John Carroll Blue Streaks
- 2006–2016: Cleveland State Vikings
- * Club domestic league appearances and goals

Ali Kazemaini (born in Tehran, Iran) is a retired Iranian-American soccer forward and former men's head coach at Cleveland State. He spent eight seasons in the Major Indoor Soccer League and one in the National Professional Soccer League, earning 1985 MISL Rookie of the Year honors.

== Youth ==
Born in Tehran, Iran, Kazemaini moved to the United States to attend Orange High School in Orange County, California. He graduated from Orange High School in 1980 and entered Cleveland State University that fall. While at Cleveland State, he played on both the school's soccer and tennis teams. In June 1983, the U.S. government discovered that he had allowed his student visa to lapse in January 1979, thus placing him in the country illegally. He subsequently reapplied for a visa as well as U.S. citizenship. Kazemaini played for the Vikings from 1980 to 1983. He finished his career ranked fifth on the career goals list with 41, sixth in points with 102 and ninth in assists with 20. He was a second team All American in 1981 and 1983.

Following his collegiate career, Kazemaini was selected for the 1984 U.S. Olympic soccer team. However, he had not yet received his citizenship before the games began and was dropped from the team.

== Professional ==
In 1983, Kazemaini was drafted by both the Cleveland Force of Major Indoor Soccer League and the San Diego Sockers of the North American Soccer League. He signed with the Force, earning Rookie of the Year honors for the 1984–1985 season. When the Force folded following the 1987–1988 season, he moved to the Tacoma Stars. At some point, he moved to the Baltimore Blast, playing for them during at least the 1991–1992 season. Both MISL and the Blast folded at the end of the season, and Kazemaini moved to the Canton Invaders of the National Professional Soccer League for the 1992–1993 season, after having appeared for the North York Rockets in the outdoor Canadian Soccer League.

== Coach ==
In 1992, John Carroll University hired Kazemaini as head coach. Over fourteen seasons, his team won seven Ohio Athletic Conference regular season titles and four post-season tournament titles and compiled a 177–61–13 record. On December 15, 2005, Kazemaini moved to Cleveland State.

In 2005, Kazemaini coached the Cleveland Soccer Academy in the USL Super Y-League.
