= Krenzler Field =

Soccer stadium in Cleveland, Ohio

Coordinates: 41°30′15″N 81°40′43″W

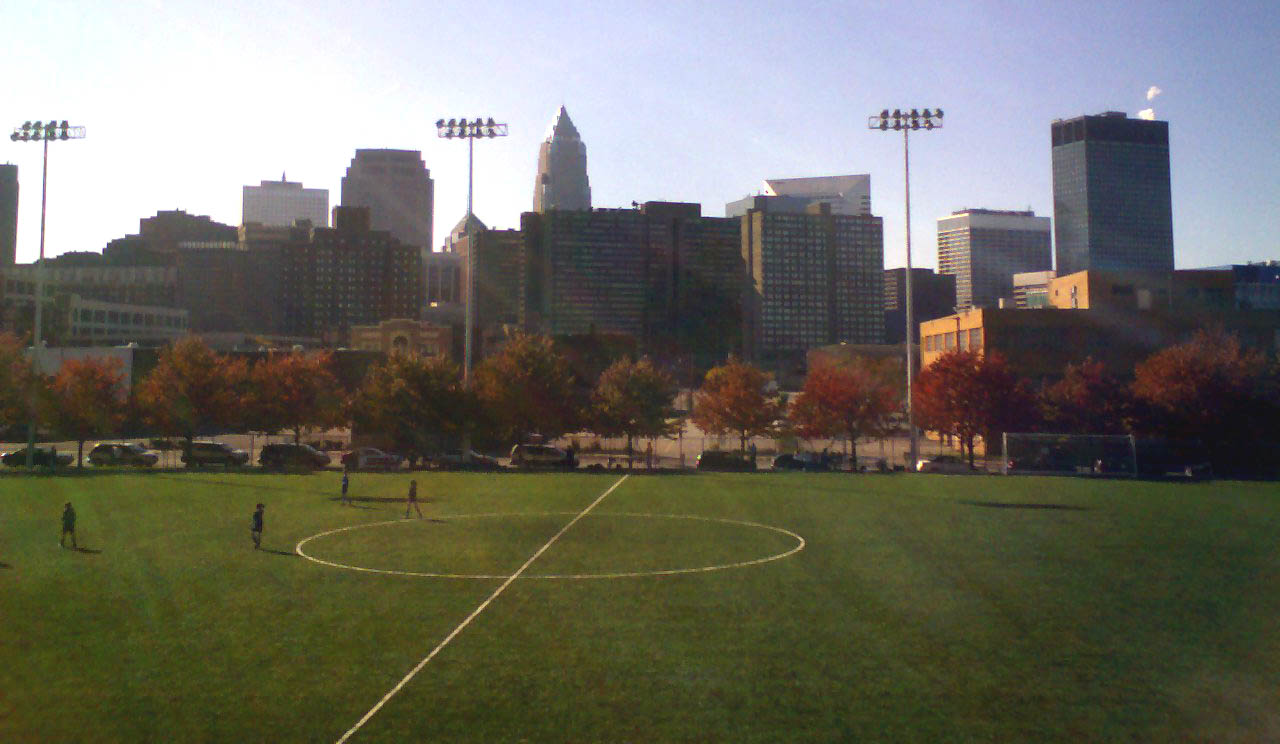
- The stadium during a game in 2005
- Interactive map of Krenzler Field
- Address: E 18th Street; Cleveland, Ohio; United States
- Owner: Cleveland State University
- Operator: CSU Athletics
- Capacity: 1,680
- Type: Soccer-specific stadium
- Surface: FieldTurf

Construction
- Opened: October 18, 1985; 40 years ago
- Cost: $1.9 million

Tenants
- Cleveland State Vikings (NCAA); Men's soccer (1985–present); Women's soccer (2004–present); Men's lacrosse (2017–present); Cleveland City Stars (USL1) 2007–2008; AFC Cleveland (NPSL) 2013

Website
- csuvikings.com/krenzler-field

Krenzler Field is a soccer-specific stadium in Cleveland on the campus of Cleveland State University (CSU). It serves as the home field to the CSU men's and women's varsity soccer teams and varsity men's lacrosse team, and was home to the Cleveland City Stars of the USL First Division from 2007 to 2008 and to AFC Cleveland of the National Premier Soccer League in 2013.

It is named in honor of Judge Alvin Krenzler.

The 1,680-seat stadium was built in 1985 and has received many upgrades since, including the addition of an air supported dome in winter months to provide an indoor practice facility. The field surface is FieldTurf.
