= Alumni Field (Wright State) =

Soccer stadium in Fairborn, Ohio

Coordinates: 39.789802°N 84.048167°W

Alumni Field is the on-campus soccer stadium at Wright State University in Fairborn, Ohio, United States. The field was dedicated in 1999 and is so named because it was built through a gift from the Wright State University Alumni Association. The stadium seats 1,000 fans and is also used for local semi-professional, amateur, and youth soccer events.
