= Robert Morris Colonials =

College sports teams

- University: Robert Morris University
- Nickname: Colonials
- NCAA: Division I (FCS)
- Conference: Horizon League (primary); NEC (football, men's lacrosse); Mid-American Conference (women's lacrosse); College Hockey Mid-America (ACHA); MAAC (women's rowing), AHA (men's & women's ice hockey)
- Athletic director: Dr. Ron Moses
- Location: Moon Township, Pennsylvania
- Varsity teams: 19
- Football stadium: Joe Walton Stadium
- Basketball arena: UPMC Events Center
- Ice hockey arena: Clearview Arena
- Softball stadium: North Athletic Complex
- Soccer stadium: North Athletic Complex
- Lacrosse stadium: Joe Walton Stadium
- Colors: Blue, white, and red
- Mascot: RoMo
- Fight song: Go Colonials
- Website: rmucolonials.com
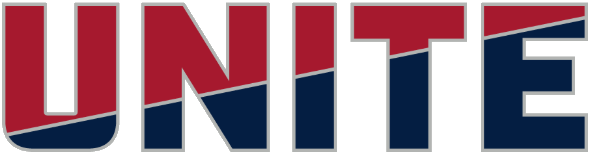

The Robert Morris Colonials are the athletic teams for Robert Morris University, in Moon Township, Pennsylvania, a suburb of Pittsburgh. The Colonials compete in NCAA Division I (FCS, formerly Division I-AA, in football). In 2020, the school joined the Horizon League as a full member after leaving the Northeast Conference (NEC). Several RMU sports that are not sponsored by the Horizon League play in other conferences. Football and men's lacrosse compete in the NEC, men's and women's ice hockey in Atlantic Hockey America, women's lacrosse in the Mid-American Conference, and women's rowing in the Metro Atlantic Athletic Conference. The school colors are RMU Blue, RMU Red, and RMU Gray/Silver.

In December 2013, Robert Morris announced the school was cutting seven sports programs after the 2013–14 season: men's indoor and outdoor track, tennis and cross country and women's golf, tennis and field hockey. Men's cross country was reinstated in 2020. In July 2026, the university announced that two more of the discontinued programs, men's outdoor track and field and women's golf, would return beginning with the 2026–27 academic year, with both competing in the Horizon League. In October 2026, the school announced the addition of a men's wrestling program starting the 2027-28 academic season.

== Teams ==
Men's sports	Women's sports
Basketball	Basketball
Cross country	Cross country
Football	Golf
Golf	Ice hockey
Ice hockey	Lacrosse
Lacrosse	Rowing
Soccer	Soccer
Track and field^{†}	Softball
	Track and field^{‡}
	Volleyball
† – Men's track and field is outdoor only ‡ – Women's track and field includes both indoor and outdoor

=== Men's and women's basketball ===
The men's team, which achieved NCAA Division I status starting with the 1976–77 season, has played in nine NCAA Tournaments:

- 1982 Lost to Indiana (first round)
- 1983 Lost to Purdue (first round)
- 1989 Lost to Arizona (first round)
- 1990 Lost to Kansas (first round)
- 1992 Lost to UCLA (first round)
- 2009 Lost to Michigan State (first round)
- 2010 Lost to Villanova (first round)
- 2015 Lost to Duke (second round)
- 2025 Lost to Alabama (first round)

In 1983, they won their first NCAA Tournament game, a "play-in" game against Georgia Southern, which earned them the right to play Purdue in the first round.

The men's team played in the National Invitation Tournament (NIT) in 2008, 2013, and 2014. They defeated defending national champion Kentucky in the first round of the 2013 NIT, a game that was played on the Robert Morris campus because Rupp Arena in Lexington, KY, was not available.

In recent years, both the men's and women's teams have had success in their conference. The women's team won the NEC Championship in 2008 and made an appearance in the 2008 NCAA Tournament, only to bow out in the first round to Rutgers. The women's team won the NEC Championship again in 2014, losing to Notre Dame in the first round of the 2014 NCAA Tournament.

The men's team won the 2009 NEC Championship, beating Mount St. Mary's 48–46. With the win, the school qualified for the 2009 NCAA Tournament, their sixth trip to the tournament. Their seventh trip came a year later, when the Colonials became the first team to beat Quinnipiac University on the Bobcats' home court all season. The 52–50 win set up a date with Villanova in the 2010 NCAA Tournament. Behind 23 points from freshman guard Karon Abraham, No. 15 Robert Morris nearly pulled off an upset of the No. 2 Wildcats, leading much of the game before falling 73–70 in overtime.

The 2015 men's team followed their NEC Championship with the second NCAA Tournament game victory in school history, an 81–77 "play-in" game triumph over the University of North Florida. The victory earned the team a first-round match-up with the eventual national champion, Duke Blue Devils.

The 2019-20 season was a special one for the Colonials, as they played their inaugural season at the UPMC Events Center. The first game in the new building marked the first time the RMU men would play host to their intra-county rivals, the Pitt Panthers. Although they would go on to lose that game, the men's team capped off the season with their record ninth—and final—NEC tournament title as they defeated Saint Francis University. That championship would have earned them an automatic bid to the 2020 NCAA Tournament, but it was canceled due to the onset of the COVID-19 pandemic. It was also the Colonials' last season in the NEC, as they would join the Horizon League after that season.

In 2024–25, their fifth season in the Horizon League, the men's team won both the conference regular-season and tournament championships, earning the program's ninth NCAA Tournament berth and its first as a member of the Horizon League. The Colonials lost to Alabama in the first round of the 2025 NCAA Tournament.

=== Ice hockey ===
The men's and women's ice hockey teams competes in NCAA Division I as members of Atlantic Hockey America, formed after the 2023–24 season by the merger of the former men's home of the Atlantic Hockey Association and the women's home of College Hockey America. RMU also fields a men's ACHA DI team that is a member of College Hockey Mid-America.

Since 2006, the ice hockey team has hosted the Three Rivers Classic (previously known as the Pittsburgh Collegiate Hockey Showcase until 2012), currently played at PPG Paints Arena (previously played at the now-demolished Mellon Arena.) The 2010 match-up featured No. 1 ranked Miami (Ohio). The 3–12–3 Colonials upset the RedHawks, 3–1. Two days later the Colonials won again at Miami. The Colonials' biggest previous win since the program was started in 2004 was against No. 2 Notre Dame in 2007. Former professional hockey-player David Hanson (of Slap Shot fame) currently manages RMU's Island Sports Complex.

On May 26, 2021, Robert Morris University terminated both the men's and women's varsity hockey programs. On December 17, 2021, the school announced that, after successful fundraising efforts, the two teams would return for the 2023–24 season. RMU was soon reinstated to its former conference homes of the Association and CHA. The two conferences merged shortly after the 2023–24 season to create the current Atlantic Hockey America.

=== Football ===
The football and lacrosse teams play in Joe Walton Stadium, named in honor of former football team head coach Joe Walton, formerly the head coach of the NFL's New York Jets in the 1980s, and who started the program at Robert Morris in 1993. Walton led the team to the first Northeast Conference championship in 1996 and guided it to a perfect 10–0 season in 2000. Also, in 2010, Walton coached the Colonials football team to the NEC's inaugural bid to the FCS Playoffs with their league-high sixth regular-season championship. Walton retired after the 2013 season, handing the reins to top assistant John Banaszak, who won multiple Super Bowls as a defensive end with the Pittsburgh Steelers.

Bernard Clark Jr. was named the third head coach in program history in December 2017. Under Clark, the program competed in the Big South Conference from 2020 through 2023 before returning to the Northeast Conference in 2024.

=== Other athletic teams ===
The school's soccer teams both play on the North Athletic Complex, and the ice hockey teams play their home games at Clearview Arena at the Robert Morris University Island Sports Center on Neville Island, a short distance from campus.

The men's lacrosse program began varsity competition in 2005 and has since reached the NCAA Tournament five times. On February 14, 2009, the men's lacrosse team defeated Penn State 12–11 in double overtime in the program's biggest victory at Joe Walton Stadium.
