= UIC Flames men's soccer =

American college soccer team

- Founded: 1981; 45 years ago
- University: University of Illinois at Chicago
- Head coach: Sean Phillips (13th season)
- Conference: MVC
- Location: Chicago, Illinois, US
- Stadium: Flames Field (capacity: 1,000)
- Nickname: Flames
- Colors: Navy blue and fire engine red
Home	Away

NCAA tournament Quarterfinals
- 2007

NCAA tournament Round of 16
- 2007, 2008

NCAA tournament Round of 32
- 2000, 2006, 2007, 2008

NCAA tournament appearances
- 1999, 2000, 2006, 2007, 2008, 2016, 2017, 2018

Conference tournament championships
- 1999, 2000, 2007, 2016, 2017, 2018

Conference regular season championships
- 1999, 2000, 2006, 2008, 2013, 2015, 2019

The UIC Flames men's soccer team represents the University of Illinois at Chicago in all NCAA Division I men's college soccer competitions. The Flames previously played in the Horizon League, but moved to the Missouri Valley Conference on July 1, 2022.

== Seasons ==
National champions †	Conference champions *	Division champions ‡	NCAA Tournament berth ^

Season	Head coach	Conference	Season results							Tournament results	
Season	Head coach	Conference	Overall			Conference				Conference	NCAA
Season	Head coach	Conference	W	L	T	W	L	T	Finish	Conference	NCAA
1981	Herb Teichert	Independent	9	6	1	—	—	—	—	—	—
1982	Herb Teichert	Independent	5	5	1	—	—	—	—	—	—
1983	Herb Teichert	Summit	0	16	0	0	4	0	5th	—	—
1984	Bill Ross	Summit	3	13	0	0	4	0	5th	—	—
1985	Bill Ross	Summit	2	14	1	0	4	0	5th	—	—
1986	Bill Ross	Summit	7	4	0	0	4	0	5th	—	—
1987	Bill Ross	Summit	7	8	1	0	4	0	5th	—	—
1988	Bill Ross	Summit	5	6	5	0	4	1	5th	—	—
1989	Bill Ross	Summit	6	12	1	1	5	0	6th	—	—
1990	Sasha Begović	Summit	2	14	0	1	6	0	7th	—	—
1991	Sasha Begović	Summit	6	13	0	1	7	0	9th	—	—
1992	Sasha Begović	Summit	7	11	0	4	3	0	3rd	—	—
1993	Sasha Begović	Summit	5	12	1	2	5	1	7th	—	—
1994	Sasha Begović	Horizon	7	11	1	2	6	0	6th, West	—	—
1995	Sasha Begović	Horizon	4	14	0	1	7	0	9th	—	—
1996	Sasha Begović	Horizon	8	9	2	1	7	0	9th	—	—
1997	Sasha Begović	Horizon	13	6	1	4	3	0	4th	Semifinals	—
1998	Sasha Begović	Horizon	13	3	1	5	2	0	3rd	Semifinals	—
1999^	Sasha Begović	Horizon	17	4	0	6	1	0	1st*	Champion*	First round
2000^	Sasha Begović	Horizon	18	4	2	5	1	1	1st*	Champion*	Third round
2001	Sasha Begović	Horizon	11	6	1	4	2	1	3rd	Semifinals	—
2002	Sasha Begović	Horizon	10	8	2	4	2	1	3rd	Semifinals	—
2003	Sasha Begović	Horizon	10	7	2	3	2	2	3rd	Quarterfinals	—
2004	Sasha Begović	Horizon	5	12	2	3	3	1	5th	Quarterfinals	—
2005	John Trask	Horizon	10	5	2	4	2	1	3rd	Quarterfinals	—
2006^	John Trask	Horizon	13	3	5	5	1	1	1st*	Semifinals	Second round
2007^	John Trask	Horizon	13	6	6	4	1	3	3rd	Champion*	Quarterfinals
2008^	John Trask	Horizon	12	4	6	6	1	1	1st*	Semifinals	Third round
2009	John Trask	Horizon	6	6	7	3	3	2	5th	Quarterfinals	—
2010	Sean Phillips	Horizon	7	11	0	3	5	0	7th	—	—
2011	Sean Phillips	Horizon	9	7	3	3	4	1	5th	Quarterfinals	—
2012	Sean Phillips	Horizon	7	8	2	3	3	1	3rd	Quarterfinals	—
2013*	Sean Phillips	Horizon	16	4	0	7	0	0	1st*	Runners-Up	—
2014	Sean Phillips	Horizon	7	8	2	3	4	1	7th	—	—
2015*	Sean Phillips	Horizon	9	6	3	6	1	2	1st*	Semifinals	—
2016^	Sean Phillips	Horizon	9	8	3	5	3	1	2nd	Champion*	First round
2017^	Sean Phillips	Horizon	11	6	3	6	2	1	2nd	Champion*	First round
2018^	Sean Phillips	Horizon	12	6	2	5	2	1	2nd	Champion*	First round
2019*	Sean Phillips	Horizon	12	5	1	6	2	0	1st*	Semifinals	—
2020	Sean Phillips	Horizon	6	3	1	6	2	1	3rd	Semifinals	—
2021	Sean Phillips	Horizon	9	8	2	6	4	0	4th	Semifinals	—
2022	Sean Phillips	Horizon	5	9	2	3	4	1	4th	Quarterfinals	—
2023	Sean Phillips	Horizon	11	5	3	4	2	2	3rd	Semifinals	—
2024	Sean Phillips	Horizon	7	10	0	3	5	0	6th	Quarterfinals	—
