= Detroit Mercy Titans men's soccer =

American college soccer team

Detroit Mercy Titans
- Founded: 1987
- University: University of Detroit Mercy
- Head coach: Nate Kopunek (4th season)
- Conference: Horizon
- Location: Detroit, Michigan, US
- Stadium: Titan Field (capacity: 3,000)
- Nickname: Titans
- Colors: Red, white, and blue
Home	Away

NCAA tournament Round of 32
- 1996

NCAA tournament appearances
- 1996

Conference tournament championships
- 1996

Conference regular season championships
- 1995, 2005, 2012, 2014

The Detroit Mercy Titans men's soccer program represents the University of Detroit Mercy in all NCAA Division I men's college soccer competitions. Founded in 1987, the Titans compete in the Horizon League. The Titans Coach is Nate Kopunek, who joined the team on March 6, 2023, replacing Coach Deren. Titans plays their home matches at Titan Field, on the Detroit Mercy campus.

== Coaching history ==
University of Detroit Mercy has had four coaches in their program's existence. Records through 2026 season.

Years	Coach	Games	W	L	T	Pct.
1987–1991	Louie Stankovich	89	27	57	5	.331
1992–2009	Morris Lupenec	345	150	153	42	.496
2009–2022	Nicholas Deren	236	75	119	42	.407
2023–present	Nate Kopunek	70	17	40	13	.336

== Seasons ==
National champions †	Conference champions *	Division champions ‡	NCAA Tournament berth ^

Season	Head coach	Conference	Season results							Tournament results	
Season	Head coach	Conference	Overall			Conference				Conference	NCAA
Season	Head coach	Conference	W	L	T	W	L	T	Finish	Conference	NCAA
1987	Louie Stankovich	Horizon (Note: The Horizon League was known as the Midwestern Collegiate Conference from 1985 until 2001.)	8	8	1	—	—	—	—	—	—
1988	Louie Stankovich	Horizon	7	10	2	—	—	—	—	—	—
1989	Louie Stankovich	Horizon	6	13	0	1	5	0	3rd, North	Quarterfinal	—
1990	Louie Stankovich	Horizon	3	14	0	1	7	0	9th	First round	—
1991	Louie Stankovich	Horizon	3	12	2	1	4	1	6th	First round	—
1992	Morris Lupenec	Horizon	7	11	1	1	5	1	7th	Quarterfinal	—
1993	Morris Lupenec	Horizon	16	4	3	4	1	1	2nd	Final	—
1994	Morris Lupenec	Horizon	8	8	4	4	4	2	4th, East	Semifinal	—
1995 *	Morris Lupenec	Horizon	13	6	2	6	0	2	1st *	Final	—
1996 ^	Morris Lupenec	Horizon	14	4	4	5	2	1	3rd	Champion *	First round ^
1997	Morris Lupenec	Horizon	10	7	2	5	1	1	2nd	Quarterfinal	—
1998	Morris Lupenec	Horizon	4	11	2	1	5	1	7th	Quarterfinal	—
1999	Morris Lupenec	Horizon	7	14	0	3	4	0	6th	Final	—
2000	Morris Lupenec	Horizon	3	13	1	1	5	1	7th	Quarterfinal	—
2001	Morris Lupenec	Horizon	7	8	4	1	5	1	7th	Quarterfinal	—
2002	Morris Lupenec	Horizon	11	6	3	2	4	1	6th	Quarterfinal	—
2003	Morris Lupenec	Horizon	8	9	2	4	3	0	4th	Semifinal	—
2004	Morris Lupenec	Horizon	14	6	0	4	3	0	3rd	Final	—
2005 *	Morris Lupenec	Horizon	12	6	2	6	1	0	1st *	Final	—
2006	Morris Lupenec	Horizon	6	9	3	2	5	0	7th	Quarterfinal	—
2007	Morris Lupenec	Horizon	5	10	5	1	4	3	8th	Quarterfinal	—
2008	Morris Lupenec	Horizon	4	13	3	1	6	1	9th	Second round	—
2009	Morris Lupenec	Horizon	5	12	1	2	6	0	8th	—	—
2010	Nicholas Deren	Horizon	8	8	2	4	4	0	5th	Quarterfinal	—
2011	Nicholas Deren	Horizon	5	12	1	1	6	1	9th	—	—
2012 *	Nicholas Deren	Horizon	10	9	0	6	1	0	1st *	Semifinal	—
2013	Nicholas Deren	Horizon	3	11	4	0	7	0	8th	—	—
2014	Nicholas Deren	Horizon	9	7	4	6	2	0	2nd	Semifinal	—
2015	Nicholas Deren	Horizon	7	5	8	3	1	5	4th	Quarterfinal	—
2016	Nicholas Deren	Horizon	3	10	4	1	6	2	9th	—	—
2017	Nicholas Deren	Horizon	7	8	4	4	4	1	6th	Semifinal	—
2018	Nicholas Deren	Horizon	1	14	3	0	6	2	9th	—	—
2019	Nicholas Deren	Horizon	7	11	1	4	3	1	3rd	Quarterfinal	—
2020	Nicholas Deren	Horizon	2	5	0	2	5	0	9th	—	—
2021	Nicholas Deren	Horizon	5	7	5	4	3	3	6th	Quarterfinal	—
2022	Nicholas Deren	Horizon	4	7	6	3	2	4	6th	Quarterfinal	—
2023	Nate Kopunek	Horizon	5	10	3	4	3	2	4th	Quarterfinal	—
2024	Nate Kopunek	Horizon	3	10	4	2	3	4	7th	—	—
2025	Nate Kopunek	5	10	3	2	5	2	8th	—	—	
2026	Nate Kopunek	4	10	3	3	6	1	9th	—	—	

=== NCAA Tournament history ===
Detroit Mercy have appeared in one NCAA Tournaments. Their sole appearance came in 1996.

Year	Record	Seed	Region	Round	Opponent	Results
1996	14–4–4	—N/a	Bloomington	First round	Bowling Green	L 0–4

== Rivalries ==
Detroit's primary rival is the Oakland Grizzlies. Both programs compete in the Horizon League and are separated by 15 miles. Detroit also has intra-conference rivalries with Wright State and Cleveland State.

== Individual honors ==
=== National honors ===
==== All-Americans ====
No player from the program has been named an All-American.

=== Conference honors ===
The following players have earned Horizon League individual honors.

- Horizon League Player of the Year
  - 1996: Tim Blackwell
  - 1997: Jorge Ferreira
  - 2005: Andrew Ornoch
  - 2012: Adam Bedell
- Horizon League Men's Soccer Tournament Most Valuable Player
  - 1995: Dominic Vella
  - 1996: Jeff Thomas
- All-Horizon League First Team selection
  - 2021: Jonathan Kliewer
- Horizon League Newcomer of the Year
  - 1993: Kal Kaliszewski
  - 1995: Jorge Ferreira
  - 1997: Marcel Flemming
  - 2010: Ya Ya Toure
  - 2021: Jonathan Kliewer
- Horizon League Offensive Player of the Year
  - 2005: Andrew Ornoch
  - 2012: Adam Bedell
- Horizon League Defensive Player of the Year
  - 2005: Jason Massoglia
- Horizon League Goalkeeper of the Year
  - 2005: Sasha Bošković
  - 2021: Jonathan Kliewer

== Team honors ==
- Horizon League Regular Season
  - Winners (3): 1995, 2005, 2012
  - Runners-up (3): 1993, 1997, 2014
- Horizon League Men's Soccer Tournament
  - Winners (1): 1996
  - Runners-up (5): 1993, 1995, 1999, 2004, 2005

== Notes ==
Home field
https://detroittitans.com/news/2023/3/6/mens-soccer-nate-kopunek-named-detroit-mercy-mens-soccer-head-coach.aspx In 2022 is the 100th year anniversary playing football (soccer) on the location at Fairfield and McNichols Road. The primary tenant was the University of Detroit Titans football team, who played their home games there from the time it opened 1922, until the university dropped the program, following the 1964 season. The Titans played their home games on campus at University of Detroit Stadium. Titan Field was called U of D Stadium and was home to Detroit Lions of NFL.: University of Detroit Stadium (1934–1940)
