= Wright State Raiders men's soccer =

American college soccer team

- 2019 Wright State Raiders men's soccer team
- Founded: 1968; 58 years ago
- University: Wright State University
- Head coach: Alex Van der Sluijs (3rd season)
- Conference: Horizon
- Location: Dayton, Ohio, US
- Stadium: WSU Alumni Field (capacity: 1,000)
- Nickname: Raiders
- Colors: Hunter green and vegas gold
Home	Away

NCAA tournament Round of 32
- 2019

NCAA tournament appearances
- 2019

Conference tournament championships
- 2019

Conference Regular Season championships
- 2016, 2018

== Overview ==
The Wright State Raiders men's soccer program represents Wright State University in all NCAA Division I men's college soccer competitions. The Raiders compete in the Horizon League. The Raiders are coached by Alex Van der Sluijs, who has coached the program for three years. Wright State play their home matches at WSU Alumni Field.

In 2019, for the first time in program history, the Raiders earned a berth into the NCAA Division I Men's Soccer Tournament.

== History ==
Founded in 1968, the Raiders competed for five seasons before dissolving the team following the 1972 season. During their first stretch, the team competed independently without joining a permanent conference. The team reformed for the 1978 season and has continuously fielded a team to the present day. In 1991, the Raiders joined the Summit League, known as the Mid-Continent Conference at the time. After three seasons, conference realignment saw the Raiders join the Midwestern Collegiate Conference, which later rebranded to the Horizon League.

== Rivalries ==
Wright State's main college soccer rival is Bowling Green. The two compete for the I-75 Cup.

== NCAA tournament results ==
Season	Seed	Round	Opponent	Score
2019	—N/a	First round	Notre Dame	W 3-2
2019	—N/a	Second round	Michigan	T 0-0 (L 4-5 pk)
