= Cleveland State Vikings men's soccer =

American college soccer team

Cleveland State Vikings
- Founded: 1954; 72 years ago
- University: Cleveland State University
- Head coach: Siniša Ubiparipović (1st season)
- Conference: Horizon League
- Location: Cleveland, Ohio, US
- Stadium: Krenzler Field (capacity: 1,680)
- Nickname: Vikings
- Colors: Forest green and white
Home	Away

NCAA tournament Quarterfinals
- 1969, 1977

NCAA tournament Round of 16
- 1969, 1970, 1974, 1977

NCAA tournament Round of 32
- 1969, 1970, 1974, 1975, 1977, 1978, 1979, 1980

NCAA tournament appearances
- 1969, 1970, 1974, 1975, 1977, 1978, 1979, 1980, 2012, 2022, 2025

Conference tournament championships
- 2012, 2022, 2025

Conference regular season championships
- 1984, 1986, 1988, 2022, 2025

The Cleveland State Vikings men's soccer team represent Cleveland State University in the Horizon League of NCAA Division I soccer. The team plays its home matches at Krenzler Field and is currently coached by Sinisa Ubiparipovic. The first season of soccer at Cleveland State was 1954 when the university was known as Fenn College.

== Roster ==
As of Jul 2026

Note: Flags indicate national team as defined under FIFA eligibility rules; some limited exceptions apply. Players may hold more than one non-FIFA nationality.

No.	Pos.	Nation	Player
1	GK	USA	Stephen Yerian
3	DF	CAN	Matea Kovacevic
4	DF	USA	Cole Harmer
5	DF	GER	Lennart Heck
6	MF	GER	Tom Mertz
7	FW	GER	Alex de Nittis
8	MF	SRB	Ognjen Bozovic
9	FW	USA	Adin Ibrahimovic
10	MF	SRB	Djordje Petrovic
11	MF	CAN	Uzman Ramees
12	DF	USA	Gianni Marella
13	MF	CAN	Lukas Pareja
14	DF	CAN	Thomas Bouffard
15	MF	USA	Isaac Ortega

No.	Pos.	Nation	Player
16	DF	CAN	Massimo Caruso
17	DF	USA	Carson Krushansky
18	MF	ECU	Fefo Granados
19	FW	SRB	Aleksa Micic
20	FW	CAN	Reinaldo Abraham
21	MF	USA	Niko Curic
22	FW	CAN	Luka Kovacevic
23	DF	USA	Adrian Bravo-Sanchez
24	FW	USA	Domenic Ruggerio
26	MF	USA	Niekos Whitney
30	MF	CAN	Miguel Campos
31	FW	USA	Bora Eldem
32	GK	USA	Aleksandar Kolar
33	GK	USA	Carter Buchholz

== Record by year ==
Record table
Season	Coach	Overall	Conference	Standing	Postseason
Fenn College (Independent) (1954–1964)
1954	Jack Marshall	2–2–2			
1955	Jack Marshall	4–0–1			
1956	Jack Marshall	5–3–0			
1957	Jack Marshall	5–2–1			
1958	Jack Marshall	7–1–1			
1959	Jack Marshall	9–1–0			
1960	Jack Marshall	6–4–0			
1961	Jack Marshall	2–7–0			
1962	Jack Marshall	4–3–2			
1963	Jack Marshall	4–5–1			
1964	Jack Marshall	4–6–0			
Cleveland State (Independent) (1965–1982)
1965	Jack Marshall	6–4–0			
1966	Jack Marshall	4–5–2			
1967	William Clarke	5–4–2			
1968	William Clarke	13–2–1			
1969	William Clarke	10–2–2			NCAA, Third Round
1970	William Clarke	8–4–1			NCAA, Second Round
1971	William Clarke	7–5–1			
1972	Klaas de Boer	8–4–0			
1973	Klaas de Boer	6–4–2			
1974	Klaas de Boer	9–5–0			NCAA, Second Round
1975	Klaas de Boer	10–5–0			NCAA, Second Round
1976	Klaas de Boer	8–5–1			
1977	Klaas de Boer	14–2–0			NCAA, Third Round
1978	Steve Parker	10–5–1			NCAA, Second Round
1979	Steve Parker	14–3–2			NCAA, Second Round
1980	Nasser Sarfaraz	8–5–4			NCAA, Second Round
1981	Nasser Sarfaraz	14–5–2			
1982	Brian Doyle	10–4–3			
Cleveland State (Mid-Continent Conference) (1983–1993)
1983	Brian Doyle	10–7–3	4–1–0	3rd	
1984	Brian Doyle	11–6–2	3–0–1	1st	
1985	Brian Doyle	9–9–1	2–2–0	T–2nd	
1986	Brian Doyle	12–6–1	4–0–0	1st	
1987	Tom Turner	9–10–1	2–2–0	3rd	
1988	Tom Turner	11–7–3	4–0–1	T–1st	
1989	Tom Turner	14–5–2	4–2–0	3rd	
1990	Tom Turner	12–6–2	5–2–0	3rd	
1991	Tom Turner	6–12–0	3–4–0	5th	
1992	Tom Turner	3–13–2	1–4–1	7th	
1993	Brian Doyle	9–7–3	5–1–2	2nd	
Cleveland State (Horizon League) (1994–present)
1994	Brian Doyle	3–13–0	1–8–0	6th (East)	
1995	Brian Doyle	3–12–2	2–6–0	T–7th	
1996	Brian Doyle	8–8–3	3–4–1	T–4th	
1997	Brian Doyle	8–11–2	1–5–1	7th	
1998	Brian Doyle	4–15–0	1–6–0	8th	
1999	Brian Doyle	2–14–2	1–6–0	T–7th	
2000	Pete Curtis	3–13–1	1–6–0	8th	
2001	Pete Curtis	3–15–0	0–7–0	8th	
2002	Pete Curtis	10–11–0	5–2–0	2nd	
2003	Pete Curtis	6–13–1	2–5–0	T–6th	
2004	Pete Curtis	5–12–2	0–6–1	8th	
2005	Pete Curtis	0–17–1	0–7–0	8th	
2006	Ali Kazemaini	6–10–2	3–4–0	5th	
2007	Ali Kazemaini	3–13–3	0–7–1	9th	
2008	Ali Kazemaini	9–8–3	5–2–1	3rd	
2009	Ali Kazemaini	7–8–5	4–2–2	T–3rd	
2010	Ali Kazemaini	9–10–1	4–3–1	T–3rd	
2011	Ali Kazemaini	9–9–1	5–2–1	T–2nd	
2012	Ali Kazemaini	11–6–3	4–1–2	2nd	NCAA, First Round
2013	Ali Kazemaini	8–12–0	3–4–0	T–4th	
2014	Ali Kazemaini	6–12–1	4–4–0	4th	
2015	Ali Kazemaini	9–8–2	4–3–2	5th	
2016	Ali Kazemaini	7–8–2	4–3–2	T–4th	
2017	Kirk Harwat	7–10–2	4–3–2	T–5th	
2018	Kirk Harwat	4–8–3	1–4–3	T–8th	
2019	Sinisa Ubiparipovic	7–7–1	3–5–0	T–7th	
2020	Sinisa Ubiparipovic	4–5–0	4–5–0	6th	
2021	Sinisa Ubiparipovic	10–8–0	8–2–0	2nd	
2022	Sinisa Ubiparipovic	11–4–5	5–1–3	1st	NCAA First Round
2023	Sinisa Ubiparipovic	3–9–5	2–3–4	8th	
2024	Sinisa Ubiparipovic	7–7–3	4–4–1	T–5th	
2025	Sinisa Ubiparipovic	9-4-6	5-1-3	1st	NCAA First Round
Total:		522–517–114	130–150–38		
National champion Postseason invitational champion Conference regular season champion Conference regular season and conference tournament champion Division regular season champion Division regular season and conference tournament champion Conference tournament champion

School	Season	Record	(Conf. Record)	Postseason
Total	72 years	522–517–114	(130–150–38)	11 Postseason bids

- Totals updated through the end of the 2025–2026 school year.

== NCAA Championship history ==
Season	Eliminated Round	Teams Defeated	Lost to
1969	Third round	Michigan State	St. Louis
1970	Second round	–	SIU Edwardsville
1974	Second round	–	St. Louis
1975	Second round	–	SIU Edwardsville
1977	Third round	St. Louis	SIU Edwardsville
1978	Second round	–	Indiana
1979	Second round	Wisconsin–Milwaukee	Indiana
1980	Second round	Wisconsin–Milwaukee	Indiana
2012	First round	–	Michigan State
2022	First round	–	Pittsburgh
2025	First round	–	Marshall

== Head coaching history ==
#	Name	Years	Record
1	Jack Marshall	1954—1966	41–18–7
2	William Clarke	1967—1971	43–17–7
3	Klaas de Boer	1972—1977	55–25–3
4	Steve Parker	1978—1979	24–8–3
5	Nasser Sarfaraz	1980—1981	22–10–6
6	Brian Doyle	1982—1986	52–32–10
7	Tom Turner	1987—1993	64–61–13
8	Brian Doyle	1994—1999	28–44–9
9	Pete Curtis	2000—2005	27–81–5
10	Ali Kazemaini	2006—2016	84–105–23
11	Kirk Harwat	2017—2018	11–18–5
12	Sinisa Ubiparipovic	2019—	51–44–20
