= Green Bay Phoenix men's soccer =

American college soccer team

- Founded: 1969
- University: University of Wisconsin–Green Bay
- Head coach: John O'Reilly (2nd season)
- Conference: Horizon
- Location: Green Bay, Wisconsin, US
- Stadium: Festival Foods Field at Aldo Santaga Stadium
- Nickname: Phoenix
- Colors: Green and white
Home	Away

NCAA tournament appearances
- 1983, 2009, 2023

Conference tournament championships
- 2009, 2023

Conference Regular Season championships
- 2017

The Green Bay Phoenix men's soccer team is a National Collegiate Athletic Association Division I college soccer team composed of student-athletes attending the University of Wisconsin–Green Bay. The Phoenix play their home matches at the newly constructed turf field, Festival Foods Field at Aldo Santaga Stadium, as of 2018. Like most of the other Green Bay Phoenix athletic teams, the men's soccer team competes in the Horizon League of the National Collegiate Athletic Association.

They have advanced to the NCAA Division I Tournament three times, in 1983, 2009 and 2023. They have also sent players to the pros in recent years, such as alumni Tosaint Ricketts and Kyle Ihn.

== Home ground ==
Festival Foods Field at Aldo Santaga Stadium
- Interactive map of Festival Foods Field at Aldo Santaga Stadium
- Location: 183 Leon Bond Drive, Green Bay, WI, 54311, USA
- Coordinates: 44.53014°N 87.913904°W
- Capacity: 3,500
- Surface: Turf
- Field size: 120 by 75 yards (110 m × 69 m)

Construction
- Opened: 2018

Tenants
- Green Bay Phoenix soccer team

Festival Foods Field at Aldo Santaga Stadium is a soccer-specific stadium in Green Bay, Wisconsin, on the campus of the University of Wisconsin–Green Bay. It is part of the new Kress Family Outdoor Recreation Complex. Completed in 2018, the turf field is home to the UW–Green Bay men's and women's soccer teams.

The previous soccer complex, the original Aldo Santaga Stadium, was located on the UWGB campus's East Circle Drive. The old stadium sits on land once occupied by the number one fairway at Shorewood Country Club. The flood lights were once set up at Lambeau Field.

== Team management ==
Coaching Staff

Position	Staff
Head Coach	(United States) John O'Reilly
Asst. Coach	(United States) Kyle Ihn
Asst. Coach	(United States) Kolton Prater

Last updated: August 23, 2018
Source: Green Bay Phoenix men's soccer coaching staff
