= Oakland Golden Grizzlies =

Sports teams of Oakland University

- University: Oakland University
- Nickname: Golden Grizzlies
- NCAA: Division I
- Conference: Horizon League
- Athletic director: Steve Waterfield
- Location: Auburn Hills, Michigan; Rochester Hills, Michigan
- Varsity teams: 16
- Basketball arena: OU Credit Union O'rena
- Baseball stadium: Oakland Baseball Field
- Softball stadium: Oakland Softball Field
- Colors: Black and gold
- Mascot: Grizz
- Fight song: OU Fight
- Website: goldengrizzlies.com

The Oakland Golden Grizzlies are the athletic teams that represent Oakland University (OU) in the Horizon League and Division I of the National Collegiate Athletic Association (NCAA). The school fields 16 teams: baseball, men's and women's basketball, men's and women's cross country, men's and women's golf, men's and women's soccer, softball, men's and women's swimming and diving, women's tennis, men's and women's track, and women's volleyball.

The Golden Grizzlies have won 10 NCAA national championships and were runners-up 16 times.

== History ==
Early in the history of Oakland University (OU), academic excellence was stressed at the expense of competitive intercollegiate athletics. While the focus on academic excellence has continued and expanded, the university has also come to recognize the importance of intercollegiate athletics. Throughout the 1970s, 1980s, and 1990s, OU competed in the National Collegiate Athletic Association (NCAA) Division II Great Lakes Intercollegiate Athletic Conference (GLIAC) as the "Pioneers", becoming a perennial powerhouse in numerous sports and winning multiple National Championships in men's and women's swimming. During the transition to NCAA Division I status in 1998–99, OU's sports teams became the "Golden Grizzlies".

In 2007 the OU Athletics Administration announced a marketing and sponsorship partnership with Palace Sports and Entertainment, which owns and operates the nearby The Palace of Auburn Hills, as well as the Detroit Pistons.

At the conclusion of the 2012–13 season, Oakland left The Summit League to become members of the Horizon League.

Tracy Huth served as athletic director from 2006 to 2014. He stepped down on January 24, 2014. Robby Stewart is serving as interim athletic director until a replacement is found.

=== Conference affiliation ===
The Golden Grizzlies first joined a Division I conference in 1998 when they joined the Mid-Continent Conference (now known as the Summit League). Oakland joined the Horizon League July 1, 2013.

Period	Conference	NCAA classif.
1967–68 to 1973–74	Independent	Division II
1974–75 to 1996–97	Great Lakes Intercollegiate Athletic Conference (GLIAC)	Division II
1997–98	Independent	Division I
1998–99 to 2012–13	Summit League (Note: Formerly known as Mid-Continent Conference until 2007.)	Division I
2013–14 to present	Horizon League	Division I

== Sports sponsored ==
A member of the Horizon League, Oakland University sponsors teams in eight men's and ten women's NCAA sanctioned sports.

Men's sports	Women's sports
Baseball	Basketball
Basketball	Cross country
Cross country	Golf
Golf	Soccer
Soccer	Softball
Swimming	Swimming
Diving	Diving
Track & field	Tennis
	Track & field
	Volleyball

=== Baseball ===
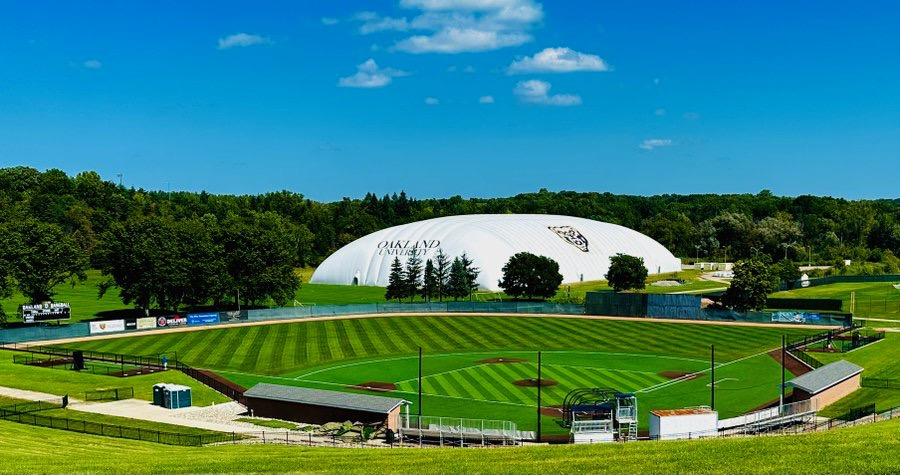
Oakland Baseball Field in 2024

OU's baseball team is led by interim coach Brian Nelson, replacing outgoing head coach Jordon Banfield. During Banfield's tenure, the Golden Grizzlies advanced to the Horizon League Championships in both 2022 and 2023, and clinched a number-two seed in the 2023 Championships, the first time since 2012. The baseball program has produced nearly two dozen players who have gone on to play professional baseball, with two advancing to Major League Baseball, Don Kirkwood, who pitched for the California Angels, the Chicago White Sox, and the Toronto Blue Jays during his 5-year MLB career (1974–1978), and Mike Brosseau, who debuted in 2019 as a utility man for the Tampa Bay Rays.

=== Basketball, men's ===
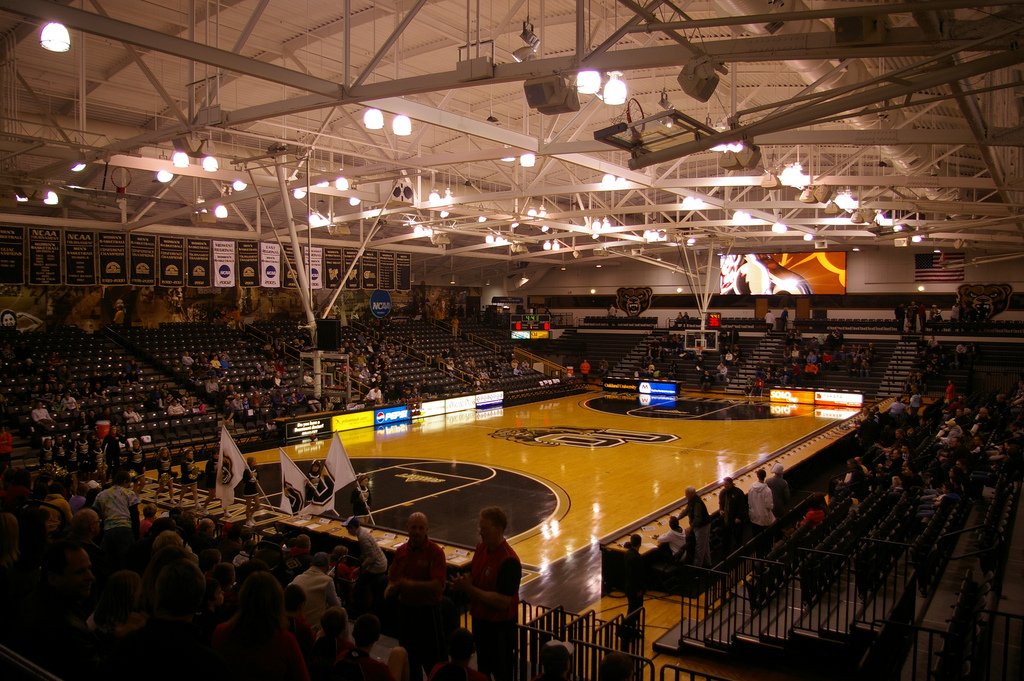
Credit Union O'rena, venue

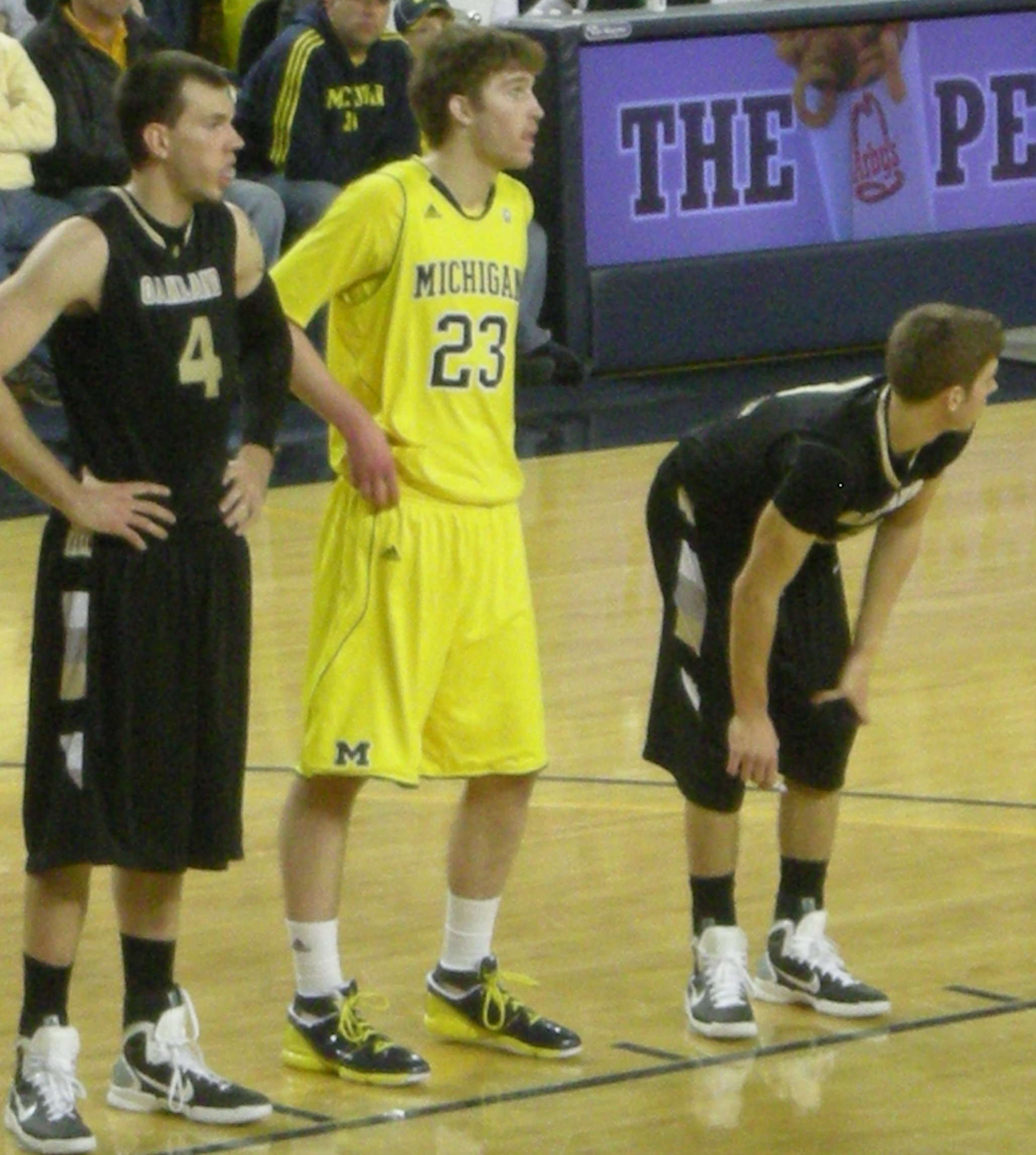
Oakland v Michigan game in 2010

The OU men's basketball team is coached by Greg Kampe, who is now among the top ten longest-serving coaches in the NCAA Division I ranks, and the longest-serving active coach in Division I Men's Basketball. OU qualified for the NCAA Men's Division I Basketball Championship tournament for the first time in 2005. The Golden Grizzlies defeated Alabama A&M University in the opening-round game at Dayton, Ohio, on March 15, 2005, before being eliminated three days later by the North Carolina Tar Heels, who went on to win the National Championship.

In 2010, Oakland made their second ever trip to the NCAA Men's Division I Basketball Championship tournament after winning the Summit League Tournament. They came in as a 14 seed against No. 3 Pittsburgh, where they were eliminated.

In the 2010–11 season, Oakland narrowly lost 77–76 to then-No. 7 Michigan State before beating then-No. 7 University of Tennessee 89–82. In the 2011–12 season, Oakland beat Tennessee for the second year in a row 89–81.

In 2011, Oakland won the Summit League regular season and tournament for the second consecutive season and again received a 14 seed. This time, they played No. 3 Texas, where they lost 85–81.

In the 2016–17 season, Oakland placed first in their league, earning a trip to the National Invitation Tournament as a 7 seed, where they lost to Richmond in the second round after upsetting 2nd seeded Clemson in the opening round.

In 2024, after winning the Horizon League Tournament (behind Conference Player of the Year Trey Townsend), Kampe's 14 seed Grizzlies were matched up against John Calipari's 3 seeded Kentucky Wildcats. Utilizing a flexible zone defense and clutch shot-making from Jack Gohlke (10–20 on 3-pointers, 2nd-most in NCAAM history), the Golden Grizzlies upset UK despite a powerful performance from Antonio Reeves, 80–76, at the PPG Paints Arena in Pittsburgh, PA. Kampe, in his 40th season, earned an NCAA Tournament victory over a blueblood, and declared it his best.

The Golden Grizzlies lost in an overtime “boxing match” against DJ Burns Jr and the 11 seed NC State in the Second Round, with Townsend leading all players with 30 points and 13 rebounds. Golhke added 22 off the bench. With a 4–1 record, 2024 marks the best postseason in OU history as of yet.

Nearly two dozen OU players have gone on to play professional basketball. After being among the top ten scorers in all of NCAA Division I basketball in 2003 and 2004, Mike Helms was drafted into the Continental Basketball Association and played briefly for the Michigan Mayhem, in addition to playing in the National Basketball League of Australia, where he finished second in the league in scoring in 2006. His OU teammate, Kelly Williams, who is Filipino American, was the No. 1 overall draft pick in the 2006 Philippine Basketball Association draft and was named the league's Rookie of the Year in 2007. Rawle Marshall, who led OU to its first NCAA tournament berth in 2005, became the first player from the university to make a National Basketball Association (NBA) roster, playing in 23 games for the Dallas Mavericks in the 2005–06 season and 40 games for the Indiana Pacers in the 2006–07 season. In the 2011 NBA draft the Atlanta Hawks selected All-American and Lou Henson Award winner Keith Benson in the second round (48th pick) making Benson the first basketball player from Oakland to be drafted by an NBA team. Kay Felder left Oakland a season early as a junior and was drafted in the second round of the 2016 NBA draft by the Atlanta Hawks, who traded him to the defending champion Cleveland Cavaliers for cash considerations.

Brian Gregory, Oakland's career assist leader, played under Kampe from 1987 to 1990 before beginning a coaching career. He was an assistant under Tom Izzo when Michigan State University won the 2000 NCAA title, and is now the head coach for the Georgia Tech Yellow Jackets men's basketball team.

=== Basketball, women's ===
The OU women's basketball team is coached by Jeff Tungate. Both basketball teams host games at the Athletics Center O'rena.

On March 7, 2006, the women's basketball team defeated Western Illinois University to capture the 2006 Mid-Continent title. On March 19, in the first round of the NCAA tournament, the No. 16 Grizzlies lost to No. 1 Ohio State Buckeyes 68–45.

In June 2013, former coach Beckie Francis was fired for intimidation and emotional abuse, because of her fixation on players weight and pushing her religious views upon the team.

=== Cross country (men's and women's) ===
Both the men's and women's cross country teams at Oakland are coached by Paul Rice.

=== Golf (men's and women's) ===
OU's has two golf courses located on the university's campus.

=== Soccer, men's ===
The men's soccer team at OU is coached by Paul Doroh, starting in the 2024 season. Doroh was an assistant under longtime head coach Eric Pogue for eight years. In 2024, Pogue and Oakland parted ways., and Doroh assumed the interim head coaching position. He was announced as head coach on April 22, 2024.

=== Soccer, women's ===
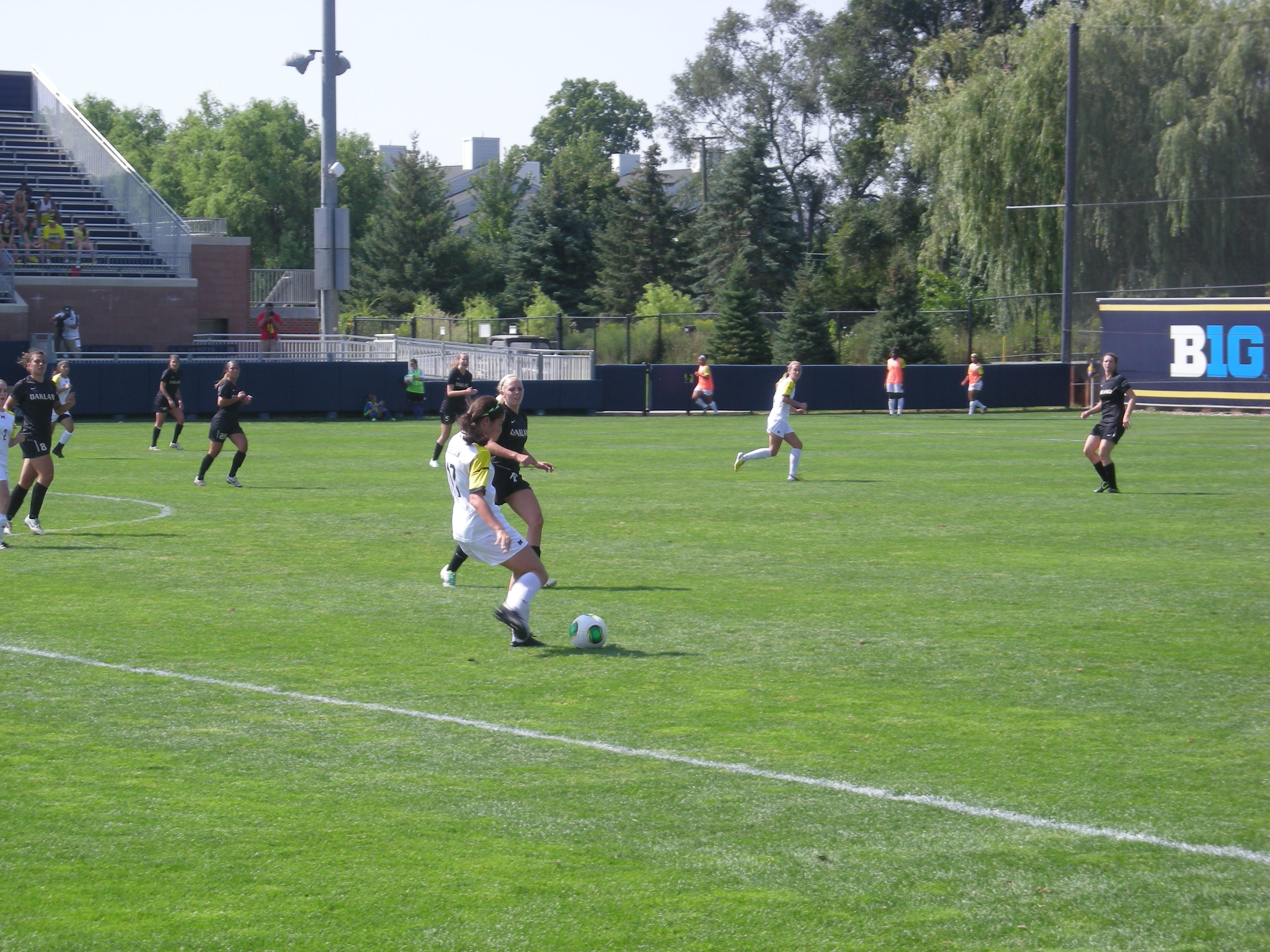
Oakland (in black) v Michigan match in 2013

The women's soccer team at OU is coached by Devin Zvosec. In addition to making the NCAA Division I tournament in 2001, 2002, 2003, and 2006, the team qualified again in 2007. They lost to Purdue University, 4–0, in the first round of the tournament on November 16, 2007. In 2024, long-time head coach Juan Pablo Favero announced his retirement.

=== Softball ===
The OU women's softball team is currently coached by Chris Stelma. He succeeds interim head coach Samantha Henderson, who in turn replaced legendary head coach Lauren Karn.

=== Swimming and diving (men's and women's) ===
Both the men's and women's swimming and diving teams at Oakland are coached by Mitch Alters. Alters took over for long-time head coach Pete Hovland following his 2023 retirement. Hovland began coaching the men's team in 1981–82. He took over the women's program in 2001.

Oakland's men's team has won five NCAA Division II national championships (1980, 1994–1997) and were runners-up 10 times (1979, 1981, 1983, 1984, 1987–1991, 1993). Through 2024, the men's team has won 46 consecutive conference meets, including every GLIAC (21), Summit League (14) and Horizon League (11) conference meet the team has participated in.

The Golden Grizzlies women's team won five consecutive NCAA Division II national championships from 1990 to 1994. They were runners-up the following three seasons (1995–1997). Through 2018, the team has won 31 conference meets, 8 in the GLIAC, 4 in the National Independent Conference (NIC), 14 in The Summit League and 5 in the Horizon League. The team won every Summit League (14) and Horizon League (5) conference meet, 4 of the 8 NIC conference meets, and 8 of the 9 GLIAC conference meets it participated in. They have currently won 24 consecutive conference tournaments.

=== Tennis, women's ===
The women's tennis team at OU is coached by David Brown.

=== Track (men's and women's) ===
The coach of the men's and women's track teams at OU is Paul Rice. Track is the newest of OU's 16 NCAA Division I sports. Micah Jones made history in 2011 as the first individual to lead the track team to the nationals.

=== Volleyball ===
The women's volleyball team at OU is coached by Krista Rice, who became head coach on March 16, 2022.

== Club sports ==
=== Football ===
In fall of 2012, Oakland University approved a club football team. The National Club Football Association is a 26 team league that uses the majority of NCAA rules. The Golden Grizzlies compete in the Great Lakes Conference of the NCFA. OU plays teams such as Ohio State, Miami (OH), UW-Milwaukee, and Wright State club football teams, as well as a varsity teams in Concordia (Ann Arbor), Olivet, and Defiance. The first season received attention from NFL Film's "Together We Make Football". Their first season concluded with a 5–2 record and #8 in the league. In their second year of existence, the 2014 team went undefeated at 9-0 winning their first NCFA National Championship. In 2016, the team achieved the perfect season in the NCFA going 12-0 and went on to win their second NCFA National Championship.

=== Ice Hockey (men's) ===
The Oakland men's club ice hockey team won the American Collegiate Hockey Association's Division 2 national championship in 2004, was national runner-up in 2005, and in 2006 again won the Division 2 championship. The team moved up to ACHA Division 1 for the 2006–07 season and won the national championship over Penn State University by a score of 5–1. In addition, the Grizzlies career scoring leader, Will McMahon, was named tournament and regular season MVP after tallying 47 goals and 29 assists in 36 games (including playoffs). McMahon finished his career with four ACHA National Player of the Year awards with career totals of 240 goals and 140 assists (380 total points). McMahon was signed by the Fort Wayne Komets of the IHL following his final season (2007) making him the first Grizzly to sign in a professional hockey league. The team is currently coached by former Ferris State men's ice hockey player Nick Field, who led Oakland to a 12–15–3 record in his first season. The Grizzlies currently compete in the Great Lakes Collegiate Hockey League conference.

== National championships ==
Oakland University won ten national NCAA Division II titles and 16 teams were national runner-up in NCAA Division II. Men's swimming and diving won five championships and finished as runner-up 10 times. Five women's swimming and diving teams also finished first and three came in second. The men's soccer team was NCAA Division II runner-up in 1986, 1994, and 1996.

National championships (10):

- 1980: Men's swimming and diving – NCAA Division II
- 1990: Women's swimming and diving – NCAA Division II
- 1991: Women's swimming and diving – NCAA Division II
- 1992: Women's swimming and diving – NCAA Division II
- 1993: Women's swimming and diving – NCAA Division II
- 1994: Men's swimming and diving – NCAA Division II
- 1994: Women's swimming and diving – NCAA Division II
- 1995: Men's swimming and diving – NCAA Division II
- 1996: Men's swimming and diving – NCAA Division II
- 1997: Men's swimming and diving – NCAA Division II

National runners-up (16):

- 1979: Men's swimming and diving – NCAA Division II
- 1981: Men's swimming and diving – NCAA Division II
- 1983: Men's swimming and diving – NCAA Division II
- 1984: Men's swimming and diving – NCAA Division II
- 1986: Men's soccer – NCAA Division II
- 1987: Men's swimming and diving – NCAA Division II
- 1988: Men's swimming and diving – NCAA Division II
- 1989: Men's swimming and diving – NCAA Division II
- 1990: Men's swimming and diving – NCAA Division II
- 1991: Men's swimming and diving – NCAA Division II
- 1993: Men's swimming and diving – NCAA Division II
- 1994: Men's soccer – NCAA Division II
- 1995: Women's swimming and diving – NCAA Division II
- 1996: Men's soccer – NCAA Division II
- 1996: Women's swimming and diving – NCAA Division II
- 1997: Women's swimming and diving – NCAA Division II

=== Club National championships ===
- 2004: Men's Ice Hockey – ACHA Division 2
- 2006: Curling – CCUSA Division IV
- 2006: Men's Ice Hockey – ACHA Division 2
- 2007: Men's Ice Hockey – ACHA Division 1
- 2014 Football - NCFA Great Lakes Conference Champions
- 2014 Football - NCFA National Champions
- 2016 Men's Ice Hockey - ACHA Division 3
- 2016 Football - NCFA Great Lakes Conference Champions
- 2016 Football - NCFA National Champions
- 2017 Football - NCFA Great Lakes Conference Champions
- 2018 Football - NCFA Great Lakes Conference Champions
- 2019 Football - NCFA Great Lakes Conference Champions
- 2021 Football - NCFA Great Lakes Conference Champions
