= Cleveland State Vikings =

Athletic teams of Cleveland State University

- University: Cleveland State University
- NCAA: Division I
- Conference: Horizon League (primary); Northeast Conference (men's lacrosse); CCFC (fencing)
- Athletic director: Kelsie Gory Harkey
- Location: Cleveland, Ohio, U.S.
- Varsity teams: 14 (7 M, 8 W)
- Basketball arena: Wolstein Center
- Soccer stadium: Krenzler Field
- Nickname: Vikings
- Colors: Forest green and white
- Mascot: Magnus
- Fight song: The Pride of Cleveland
- Website: csuvikings.com
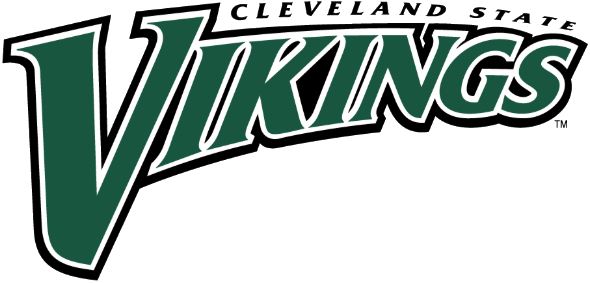

The Cleveland State Vikings, or Vikes, are the athletic teams of Cleveland State University. From 1929 to 1965, the school was a small private college known as Fenn College and athletic teams were known as the Fenn Foxes. Cleveland State competes in the National Collegiate Athletic Association (NCAA) at the Division I level, which they have been part of since 1972. They were previously members of the NCAA College Division, a precursor to NCAA Division II. The university is a full member of the Horizon League (1994–present) and an associate member of the Northeast Conference (2024–present) for men's lacrosse and the Central Collegiate Fencing Conference for fencing. Cleveland State was formerly in the Mid-Continent Conference (1982–1994) and North Star Conference (1989–1992). Cleveland State previously fielded baseball, men's cross country, women's golf, men's track and field, softball, and wrestling. As Fenn College they fielded men's ice hockey and rifle.

== Sports sponsored ==
Men's sports	Women's sports
Basketball	Basketball
Fencing	XC/Track & Field
Golf	Fencing
Lacrosse	Soccer
Soccer	Swimming & Diving
Swimming & Diving	Tennis
Tennis	Volleyball

== Facilities ==
=== Current facilities ===
- The Bert L. & Iris S. Wolstein Convocation Center- Men and women's basketball
- Krenzler Soccer Field — Men's lacrosse, men's and women's soccer
- Robert F. Busbey Natatorium – Men and women's swimming and diving
- Homer E. Woodling Gymnasium – Volleyball, wrestling and fencing
- Viking Field – Softball
- The Robert Malaga Tennis Center – Men and women's tennis

=== Former facilities ===
- All Pro Freight Stadium – Baseball
- The Ellwood H. Fisher Swimming Pool – Men's swimming
- Fenn Gym – Wrestling and fencing
- Homer E. Woodling Gymnasium – Men and women's basketball

== Athletic Director history ==
#	Name	Years
1	Homer E. Woodling	September 1, 1929 – June 30, 1966
2	Robert F. Busbey	July 1, 1966 – 1990
3	John Konstantinos	July 1, 1990 – July 1, 2002
4	Lee Reed	July 24, 2002 – May 2010
5	John Parry	May 10, 2010 – June 30, 2017
6	Michael Thomas	March 1, 2017 – April 30, 2019
7	Scott Garrett	May 1, 2019 – January 15, 2024
8	Kelsie Gory Harkey	May 16, 2024 - Present

== McCafferty Trophy ==
The McCafferty Trophy is awarded by the Horizon League to the school with the best overall athletic performance in all the sponsored sports. Cleveland State has won the award twice, in 2008 and 2013. Below is a table of the Cleveland State finishes and points.

Year	Pts. (men)	Pts. (women)	Pts. (total)	Finish	Ref.
2005	?	?	?	?	
2006	?	?	?	?	
2007	?	?	?	?	
2008	25	21	46	1st	
2009	?	?	41	3rd	
2010	?	?	36	3rd	
2011	22.5	17	39.5	3rd	
2012	19	20	39	2nd	
2013	26	19	45	1st	

== Baseball ==
Baseball at Cleveland State was played for a total of 69 seasons. On May 2, 2011, Clevleland State University announced that they would eliminate the baseball team. The reasons cited were budget concerns as well as the difficulty of having a baseball team in the northern United States with the season starting earlier and earlier and favoring teams in the warmer southern United States.

Regular season

- Mid-Continent Conference Team Championships (2):

1986, 1989

- Horizon League Team Championships (0):

Tournament

- Mid-Continent Conference Team Championships (0):
- Horizon League Team Championships (0):

== Men's basketball ==
Regular season

- Mid-Continent Conference championships (3):

1985, 1986, 1993

- Horizon League championships (2):

2011, 2021

Tournament

- Mid-Continent Conference championships (1):

1986

- Horizon League championships (2):

2009, 2021

== Men's cross country ==
- Cleveland State dropped Men's Cross Country after the 1993 season.
- Mid-Continent Conference Team Championships (1):

1992

=== NCAA Championship history ===
Season	Place	Points
1977	11th	313
1979	19th	425

== E-Sports ==
Cleveland State University launched a Division I esports program which kicked off its inaugural season in the fall of 2022.

Now they have inaugurated a new Esports Lab in Fenn Hall on September 24, 2024, located within the Washkewicz College of Engineering. This marks a major advancement for the university's esports program, which previously operated off-campus at the Cavs Legion Lair. The creation of the dedicated lab was a collaborative effort, with significant contributions from Dr. Susan Carver and Dr. Richard Schoephoerster. Their support, along with efforts from the FAST and IS&T staff, ensured the lab was ready for use by student-athletes in August. PJ Farrell, Director of Esports, expressed enthusiasm for the new space, emphasizing its role in strengthening the program and creating opportunities for growth. The lab also supports CSU's involvement in major esports events, such as high school playoffs and collegiate tournaments. Cleveland State's esports teams compete in the GLEC and NACE Premier Conferences across titles including Rocket League, League of Legends, Valorant, and Overwatch.

== Men's fencing ==
=== Record by year ===
key

- 1931–65: The school was named "Fenn College"

Season	Record	(Conf. Record)	Postseason
1931–32	0–4	(N/A)	--
1932–33	1–4	(N/A)	--
1933–34	N/A	(N/A)	--
1934–35	0–6	(N/A)	--
1935–36	N/A	(N/A)	--
1936–37	N/A	(N/A)	--
1937–38	N/A	(N/A)	--
1938–39	N/A	(N/A)	--
1939–40	N/A	(N/A)	--
1940–41	N/A	(N/A)	--
1941–42	N/A	(N/A)	--
1942–43	N/A	(N/A)	--
1943–44	N/A	(N/A)	--
1944–45	N/A	(N/A)	--
1945–46	N/A	(N/A)	--
1946–47	N/A	(N/A)	--
1947–48	N/A	(N/A)	--
1948–49	0–5	(N/A)	--
1949–50	1–6	(N/A)	--
1950–51	2–6	(N/A)	--
1951–52	N/A	(N/A)	--
1952–53	3–4	(N/A)	--
1953–54	6–4	(N/A)	--
1954–55	5–6	(N/A)	--
1955–56	3–9	(N/A)	--
1956–57	7–5	(N/A)	--
1957–58	9–2	(N/A)	--
1958–59	5–6	(N/A)	--
1959–60	8–6	(N/A)	--
1960–61	10–7	(N/A)	--
1961–62	5–9	(N/A)	--
1962–63	3–9	(N/A)	--
1963–64	6–6	(N/A)	--
1964–65	4–9	(N/A)	--
1965–66	3–9	(?–?)	--
1966–67	3–7	(?–?)	--
1967–68	10–6	(?–?)	--
1968–69	5–10	(?–?)	--
1969–70	3–9	(?–?)	--
1970–71	5–9	(?–?)	--
1971–72	5–10	(?–?)	--
1972–73	9–5	(?–?)	--
1973–74	14–3	(?–?)	--

Season	Record	(Conf. Record)	Postseason
1974–75	11–1	(?–?)	--
1975–76	12–5	(?–?)	--
1976–77	10–4	(?–?)	--
1977–78	10–3	(?–?)	--
1978–79	9–8	(?–?)	--
1979–80	11–5	(?–?)	--
1980–81	11–5	(?–?)	--
1981–82	9–8	(?–?)	--
1982–83	13–5	(?–?)	--
1983–84	17–6	(?–?)	--
1984–85	15–4	(?–?)	--
1985–86	17–6	(?–?)	--
1986–87	6–16	(?–?)	--
1987–88	9–12	(?–?)	--
1988–89	15–10	(?–?)	--
1989–90	11–10	(?–?)	--
1990–91	17–9	(?–?)	--
1991–92	10–6	(?–?)	--
1992–93	3–18	(?–?)	--
1993–94	19–13	(?–?)	--
1994–95	19–13	(?–?)	--
1995–96	10–21	(?–?)	--
1996–97	3–21	(?–?)	--
1997–98	6–19	(?–?)	--
1998–99	1–12	(?–?)	--
1999–00	?–?	(?–?)	--
2000–01	?–?	(?–?)	--
2001–02	5–6	(9th)	--
2002–03	?–?	(?–?)	--
2003–04	7–9	(10th)	--
2004–05	9–4	(8th)	--
2005–06	9–15	(14th)	--
2006–07	19–5	(3rd)	--
2007–08	11–23	(3rd)	--
2008–09	9–23	(9th)	--
2009–10	4–17	(9th)	--
2010–11	8–23	(9th)	--
2011–12	13–17	(10th)	--
2012–13	18–10	(5th)	--
2013–14	23–13	(?–?)	--
?? years	?–?	(?–?)	? Postseason bids

=== Head coaching history ===
#	Name	Tenure	Record
1	E. Sylvester Kennedy	1931–1933	1–8
2	O. Adolf Berger	1934–1935	0–6
3	John Royner; Madison Dods	1948–1949	0–5
4	Madison Dods	1949–1951	3–12
5	Charles Simonian	1952–1958	33–30
6	Madison Dods	1958–1960	13–12
7	John Szent Kiralyi	1960–1986	324–215
8	Joe Fazekas	1986–1995	176–160
9	William Reith	1995–2001	?–?
10	James A Sager	2001–2008	?–?
11	Christopher Tulleners	2008–2015	99–264
12	Jim Fazekas	2015–2017	
13	Christopher Tulleners	2017–2021	
14	Matthew Gebbett (interim)	2021-2022	
15	Christine Griffiths	2022–present	

== Football ==
On October 14, 2008, Cleveland State University President Michael Schwartz stated "he wants a blue ribbon panel to give him a recommendation on the football team before July 1 when he is scheduled to retire. He also said the program will have to be structured to pay for itself." On November 19, 2008, it was revealed that President Schwartz had chosen the committee members to explore the feasibility of football at Cleveland State. On October 9, 2009, it was announced the university had completed its feasibility study. From April 12–14, 2010 the Cleveland State Student Government Association polled students online about whether they favored football at Cleveland State. The results were as follows.

#	Question	% Yes	Votes	% No	Votes
1	Are you interested in having Cleveland State add a Division I non-scholarship football team?	68.7	1,214	31.3	553
2	Are you willing to pay a fee for Division I non-scholarship football in addition to any potential, future tuition increases that may be instituted by the university?	44.4	780	55.6	977
3	The fee that would be instituted will cover operating costs for the football team. This would include staff salaries, equipment, travel, insurance, and medical care. Would you be willing to pay $4 to $6 per credit hour for CSU football?	51.8	913	48.2	847
4	Would you be willing to pay $6 to $8 per credit hour for CSU football and other Division I sports?	41.8	732	58.2	1,022

== Men's golf ==
- Mid-Continent Team Championships (0):
- Horizon League Team Championships (10): 1998, 2006, 2008–09, 2011, 2014–18

== Men's ice hockey ==
Fenn College sponsored a men's ice hockey team in the 1930s and 1940s.

- Ohio-Pennsylvania Intercollegiate Hockey League Team Championships (0):

=== Record by year ===
Record table
Season	Coach	Overall	Conference	Standing	Postseason
Fenn College (Penn-Ohio Intercollegiate Hockey League) (1938–1941)
1938	Bud Cook	1–8–1			
1939	Peggy O'Neill	3–9–0			Lost, John Carroll
1940	James W. Griswold	2–11–0			
1941	James W. Griswold	2–6–1			
Total:		8–34–2			
National champion Postseason invitational champion Conference regular season champion Conference regular season and conference tournament champion Division regular season champion Division regular season and conference tournament champion Conference tournament champion

School	Season	Record	(Conf. Record)	Postseason
Total	4 years	8–34–2	(8–34–2)	1 Postseason bid

=== Head coaching history ===
#	Name	Years	Record
1	Bud Cook	1938–1938	1–8–1
2	Peggy O'Neill	1939–1939	3–9–0
3	James W. Griswold	1940–1941	4–17–1

== Men's lacrosse ==
Cleveland State established its varsity men's lacrosse program on March 30, 2015. The Vikings' inaugural lacrosse match was a 13–8 home loss to Michigan on February 4, 2017.

CSU competed as an independent for its first five men's lacrosse seasons. After the 2021 season, CSU joined the newly reinstated men's lacrosse league of the Atlantic Sun Conference (then officially the ASUN Conference). After the 2024 season, CSU left ASUN men's lacrosse for the Northeast Conference, which reinstated the sport after a two-season absence.

=== Head coaching history ===
#	Name	Years	Record
1	Dylan Sheridan	2017–2019	5–9
2	Andy German	2019–present	

== Men's rifle ==
- No team since 1937–1938, no place to shoot.

=== Head coaching history ===
#	Name	Years
1	Don Fable	1929–1938

== Men's soccer ==
Regular season

- Mid-Continent Conference Team Championships (3):

1984, 1986, 1988

- Horizon League Team Championships (0):

Tournament

- Horizon League Team Championships (1):

2012

== Men's swimming & diving ==
- Penn-Ohio Conference Championships (14): 1974, 1976–1986, 1990–1992
- Mid-Continent Conference Team Championships (0):
- Horizon League Team Championships (4):

1998, 1999, 2006, 2013

=== Record by year ===
School	Season	Record	Postseason
Fenn College	1931–32	1–4–0	--
Fenn College	1932–33	3–3–0	--
Fenn College	1933–34	0–4–2	--
Fenn College	1934–35	6–4–0	--
Fenn College	1935–36	9–1–0	--
Fenn College	1936–37	4–8–0	--
Fenn College	1937–38	3–8–0	--
Fenn College	1938–39	5–5–0	--
Fenn College	1939–40	4–5–0	--
Fenn College	1940–41	8–3–0	--
Fenn College	1941–42	5–7–0	--
Fenn College	1942–43	2–5–0	--
Fenn College	1943–44	N/A	--
Fenn College	1944–45	N/A	--
Fenn College	1945–46	N/A	--
Fenn College	1946–47	14–2–0	--
Fenn College	1947–48	11–3–0	--
Fenn College	1948–49	11–4–0	--
Fenn College	1949–50	9–3–0	--
Fenn College	1950–51	5–6–0	--
Fenn College	1951–52	1–11–0	--
Fenn College	1952–53	3–11–0	--
Fenn College	1953–54	1–12–0	--
Fenn College	1954–55	4–9–0	--
Fenn College	1955–56	7–8–0	--
Fenn College	1956–57	7–8–0	--
Fenn College	1957–58	10–1–0	--
Fenn College	1958–59	7–5–0	--
Fenn College	1959–60	7–6–0	--
Fenn College	1960–61	2–9–0	--
Fenn College	1961–62	2–11–0	--
Fenn College	1962–63	1–10–0	--
Fenn College	1963–64	1–9–0	--
Fenn College	1964–65	2–10–0	--
Cleveland State	1965–66	2–10–0	--
Cleveland State	1966–67	3–7–0	--
Cleveland State	1967–68	4–8–0	--
Cleveland State	1968–69	5–8–1	--
Cleveland State	1969–70	1–12–0	--
Cleveland State	1970–71	11–3–0	35th place
Cleveland State	1971–72	10–2–0	22nd place
Cleveland State	1972–73	6–6–0	43rd place
Cleveland State	1973–74	8–2–0	--
Cleveland State	1974–75	7–4–0	--
Cleveland State	1975–76	9–4–0	--
Cleveland State	1976–77	11–2–0	--
Cleveland State	1977–78	6–4–0	--
Cleveland State	1978–79	12–5–0	--
Cleveland State	1979–80	6–5–0	--
Cleveland State	1980–81	8–4–0	--
Cleveland State	1981–82	8–3–0	--
Cleveland State	1982–83	9–3–0	--
Cleveland State	1983–84	6–6–0	--
Cleveland State	1984–85	8–4–0	--
Cleveland State	1985–86	5–7–0	--
Cleveland State	1986–87	6–6–0	--
Cleveland State	1987–88	8–5–0	--
Cleveland State	1988–89	9–5–0	--
Cleveland State	1989–90	10–5–1	--
Cleveland State	1990–91	8–6–0	--
Cleveland State	1991–92	9–7–0	--
Cleveland State	1992–93	6–6–0	--
Cleveland State	1993–94	8–9–0	--
Cleveland State	1994–95	12–4–0	--
Cleveland State	1995–96	10–6–0	--
Cleveland State	1996–97	14–4–0	--
Cleveland State	1997–98	6–8–0	--
Cleveland State	1998–99	9–4–0	--
Cleveland State	1999–00	7–6–0	--
Cleveland State	2000–01	7–5–0	--
Cleveland State	2001–02	11–3	--
Cleveland State	2002–03	11–3	--
Cleveland State	2003–04	11–3	--
Cleveland State	2004–05	10–4	--
Cleveland State	2005–06	11–4	--
Cleveland State	2006–07	11–3	--
Cleveland State	2007–08	11–4	--
Cleveland State	2008–09	10–5	37th place
Cleveland State	2009–10	14–4	--
Cleveland State	2010–11	12–3	--
Cleveland State	2011–12	11–4	--
Cleveland State	2012–13	12–3	--
Cleveland State	2013–14	10–6	--
Cleveland State	2014–15	5–8	--
Cleveland State	2015–16	7–4	28th place
Cleveland State	2016–17	3–4	--
Cleveland State	2017–18	7–3	--
Cleveland State	2018–19	4–4	--
Cleveland State	2019–20	3–5	--
Cleveland State	2020–21	1–2	--
Cleveland State	2021–22	5–7	--
Cleveland State	2022–23	4–3	--
Cleveland State	2023–24	5–7	--
Cleveland State	2024–25	4–3	--
Total	92 years	622–489–6	5 Postseason bids

=== Head coaching history ===
#	Name	Years	Record
1	Larry Peterson	1931–1932	1–4–0
2	Oliver Tammi	1932–1933	3–3–0
3	William Robertson	1933–1934	0–4–2
4	Gordon Cholmondoley	1934–1935	6–4–1
5	Harry Kyr	1935–1936	9–1–0
6	Morton Leavitt	1936–1937	4–8–0
7	Robert Mills	1937–1938	3–8–0
8	Raymond Ray	1938–1950	69–37–0
9	Jody Gram	1950–1951	5–6–0
10	Robert F. Busbey	1951–1981	164–206–1
11	Wally Morton	1981–2014	310–158–3
12	Hannah Burandt	2019–2024	18–24–0
13	Trent Richardson	2024–Present	4–3–0

== Men's tennis ==
Cleveland State dropped tennis as a sport following the 1991–1992 school year. Tennis was brought back for the 1999–2000 school year.

- Mid-Continent Conference Team Championships (0):
- Horizon League Team Championships (9):

2008, 2009, 2010, 2011, 2013, 2018, 2019, 2021, 2024

== Men's track & field ==
- Cleveland State dropped Men's Track & Field after the 1992 season.

Outdoor track and field

- Mid-Continent Conference Team Championships (0):

Indoor track and field

- Mid-Continent Conference Team Championships (0):

=== NCAA Championship history ===
Season	Place	Points
1968	T-17th	10
1973	T-32nd	6

=== Head coaching history ===
#	Name	Years
1	Homer E. Woodling	1934–1942
2	Raymond Ray	1946–1950
3	Homer E. Woodling	1950–1951
4	Robert F. Busbey	1951–1956
5	David Burger	1967–1992

== Wrestling ==
- Eastern Wrestling League Team Championships (1):

1979

- Nine Vikings have achieved All-American status.

Lee Barylski, 142 pounds (1970)
Paul Azzarti, Heavyweight (1971)
Frank Yoo, 142 pounds (1972)
Tony DiGiovanni, 134 pounds (1973)
Tom Cavanaugh, 150 pounds (1973)
Toby Matney, 158 pounds (1979)
Dave Zahoransky, 142 pounds (1986, 1988)
Dan Carcelli, 142 pounds (1995)
Evan Cheek, 141 pounds (2020)

=== Record by year ===
School	Season	Record	(Conf. Record)	League/NCAA Finishes
Fenn College	1931–32	3–3–0	(N/A)	--
Fenn College	1932–33	0–3–0	(N/A)	--
Fenn College	1933–34	1–4–0	(N/A)	--
Fenn College	1934–62	N/A	(N/A)	--
Fenn College	1962–63	4–5–0	(N/A)	--
Fenn College	1963–64	2–7–0	(N/A)	--
Fenn College	1964–65	8–2–0	(N/A)	--
Cleveland State	1965–66	9–1–0	(N/A)	--
Cleveland State	1966–67	8–1–0	(N/A)	--
Cleveland State	1967–68	9–0–0	(N/A)	--
Cleveland State	1968–69	7–1–0	(N/A)	--
Cleveland State	1969–70	9–2–0	(N/A)	--
Cleveland State	1970–71	4–3–1	(N/A)	--
Cleveland State	1971–72	10–2–0	(N/A)	--
Cleveland State	1972–73	12–2–0	(N/A)	--
Cleveland State	1973–74	15–2–1	(N/A)	--
Cleveland State	1974–75	14–0–1	(N/A)	--
Cleveland State	1975–76	10–5–2	(N/A)	--
Cleveland State	1976–77	14–2–0	(N/A)	--
Cleveland State	1977–78	11–4–0	(N/A)	--
Cleveland State	1978–79	15–1–1	(N/A)	2nd EWL Tourney/21st NCAA
Cleveland State	1979–80	9–4–0	(N/A)	1st EWL Tourney
Cleveland State	1980–81	5–4–0	(N/A)	3rd EWL Tourney
Cleveland State	1981–82	6–9–1	(N/A)	4th EWL Tourney
Cleveland State	1982–83	12–4–0	(N/A)	6th EWL Tourney
Cleveland State	1983–84	12–3–0	(N/A)	2nd EWL Tourney
Cleveland State	1984–85	8–6–0	(N/A)	7th EWL Tourney
Cleveland State	1985–86	8–6–1	(N/A)	T-5th EWL Tourney
Cleveland State	1986–87	7–6–0	(N/A)	2nd EWL Tourney
Cleveland State	1987–88	7–6–0	(N/A)	6th EWL Tourney
Cleveland State	1988–89	11–6–0	(N/A)	7th EWL Tourney
Cleveland State	1989–90	5–7–0	(N/A)	8th EWL Tourney
Cleveland State	1990–91	7–7–0	(N/A)	8th EWL Tourney
Cleveland State	1991–92	10–6–1	(N/A)	7th EWL Tourney
Cleveland State	1992–93	3–8–0	(N/A)	7th EWL Tourney
Cleveland State	1993–94	4–7–0	(N/A)	7th EWL Tourney
Cleveland State	1994–95	5–7–0	(N/A)	7th EWL Tourney
Cleveland State	1995–96	6–10–0	(N/A)	7th EWL Tourney
Cleveland State	1996–97	3–17–0	(N/A)	7th EWL Tourney
Cleveland State	1997–98	7–14–0	(N/A)	7th EWL Tourney
Cleveland State	1998–99	6–8–2	(N/A)	7th EWL Tourney
Cleveland State	1999–00	9–8–1	(N/A)	7th EWL Tourney
Cleveland State	2000–01	4–13–0	(N/A)	7th EWL Tourney
Cleveland State	2001–02	6–8–0	(N/A)	5th EWL Tourney
Cleveland State	2002–03	13–6–0	(N/A)	3rd EWL Tourney
Cleveland State	2003–04	9–9–0	(N/A)	4th EWL Tourney
Cleveland State	2004–05	4–15–0	(N/A)	T-6th EWL Tourney
Cleveland State	2005–06	6–8–0	(2–4 EWL)	5th EWL Tourney
Cleveland State	2006–07	10–5–0	(3–3 EWL)	6th EWL Tourney/49th NCAA
Cleveland State	2007–08	4–11–0	(0–6 EWL)	7th EWL Tourney/51st NCAA
Cleveland State	2008–09	4–13–0	(– EWL)	6th EWL Tourney/55th NCAA
Cleveland State	2009–10	2–17–0	(– EWL)	7th EWL Tourney
Cleveland State	2010–11	3–13–0	(– EWL)	7th EWL Tourney
Cleveland State	2011–12	6–14–0	(1–6 EWL)	7th EWL Tourney
Cleveland State	2012–13	4–10–0	(1–5 EWL)	6th EWL Tourney
Cleveland State	2013–14	3–11–0	(1–4 EWL)	5th EWL Tourney
Cleveland State	2014–15	7–3–0	(4–2 EWL)	4th EWL Tourney/53rd NCAA
Cleveland State	2015–16	8–8–0	(4–2 EWL)	4th EWL Tourney/50th NCAA
Cleveland State	2016–17	2–11–0	(1–5 EWL)	6th EWL Tourney/44th NCAA
Cleveland State	2017–18	3–10–0	(1–5 EWL)	6th EWL Tourney
Cleveland State	2018–19	4–12–0	(1–5 EWL)	7th EWL Tourney
Cleveland State	2019–20	9–6–0	(5–5 MAC)	7th MAC Tourney
Cleveland State	2020–21	0–4–0	(1–1 MAC)	6th MAC Tourney/51st NCAA
Cleveland State	2021–22	8–9–0	(5–5 MAC)	6th MAC Tourney/56th NCAA
Cleveland State	2022–23	7–8–0	(6–4 MAC)	7th MAC Tourney
Cleveland State	2023–24	8–8–0	(6–3 MAC)	10th MAC Tourney/61st NCAA
Cleveland State	2024–25	3–9–0	(3–7 MAC)	10th MAC Tourney
Total	66 years	452–444–12	(?–?–?)	122 NCAA Championship Qualifiers

=== Head coaching history ===
#	Name	Years	Record
1	Spike Sperry	1931–1933	3–6
2	William White	1933–1934	1–4
3	William Leickie	1933–1934	1–4
4	Richard Bonacci	1962–1997	296–177–9
5	Jack Effner	1997–2008	71–91–3
6	Ben Stehura	2009–2018	42–110–0
7	Josh Moore	2018–2025	39–46–0

== Women's basketball ==
Regular season

- Mid-Continent Conference Team Championships (0):
- Horizon League Team Championships (0):

Tournament

- Mid-Continent Conference Team Championships (0):
- Horizon League Team Championships (2): 2008, 2010

== Women's cross country ==
- Mid-Continent Conference Team Championships (0):
- Horizon League Team Championships (0):

First Season 1980

== Women's fencing ==
=== Record by year ===
School	Season	Record	(Conf. Record)	Postseason
Cleveland State	1979–80	12–4	(?–?)	--
Cleveland State	1980–81	6–7	(?–?)	--
Cleveland State	1981–82	14–3	(?–?)	--
Cleveland State	1982–83	6–10	(?–?)	--
Cleveland State	1983–84	14–4	(?–?)	--
Cleveland State	1984–85	15–4	(?–?)	--
Cleveland State	1985–86	?–?	(?–?)	--
Cleveland State	1986–87	14–6	(?–?)	--
Cleveland State	1987–88	5–11	(?–?)	--
Cleveland State	1988–89	7–10	(?–?)	--
Cleveland State	1989–90	12–9	(?–?)	--
Cleveland State	1990–91	11 -9	(?–?)	--
Cleveland State	1991–92	15–8	(?–?)	--
Cleveland State	1992–93	9–4	(?–?)	--
Cleveland State	1993–94	?–?	(?–?)	--
Cleveland State	1994–95	17–15	(?–?)	--
Cleveland State	1995–96	11–22	(?–?)	--
Cleveland State	1996–97	17–11	(?–?)	--
Cleveland State	1997–98	5–21	(?–?)	--
Cleveland State	1998–99	?–?	(?–?)	--
Cleveland State	1999–00	?–?	(?–?)	--
Cleveland State	2000–01	?–?	(?–?)	--
Cleveland State	2001–02	4–9	(13th)	--
Cleveland State	2002–03	?–?	(?–?)	--
Cleveland State	2003–04	3–15	(11th)	--
Cleveland State	2004–05	6–7	(10th)	--
Cleveland State	2005–06	9–13	(6th)	--
Cleveland State	2006–07	6–7	(8th)	--
Cleveland State	2007–08	0–32	(13th)	--
Cleveland State	2008–09	1–33	(18th)	--
Cleveland State	2009–10	2–23	(N/A)	--
Cleveland State	2010–11	1–32	(17th)	--
Cleveland State	2011–12	3–27	(15th)	--
Cleveland State	2012–13	2–26	(19th)	--
Cleveland State	2013–14	15–20	(?–?)	--
Total	?? years	??–???	(?–?)	? Postseason bids

== Women's golf ==
- Horizon League Team Championships (1): 2017

=== Record by year ===
Record table
Season	Coach	Overall	Conference	Standing	Postseason
Cleveland State (Independent) (2001–2002)
2001–2002	Tom Porten	?–?–?	N/A		
Cleveland State (Horizon League) (2002–present)
2002–2003	Tom Porten	?–?–?	N/A		
2003–2004	Tom Porten	?–?–?	N/A		
2004–2005	Tom Porten	?–?–?	N/A		
2005–2006	Tom Porten	?–?–?	N/A		
2006–2007	Brian Varsey	?–?–?	N/A		
2007–2008	Steve Weir	?–?–?	N/A		
2008–2009	Steve Weir	?–?–?	N/A		
2009–2010	Steve Weir	?–?–?	N/A		
2010–2011	Steve Weir	?–?–?	N/A		
2011–2012	Steve Weir	?–?–?	N/A		
Total:		??–??	??–??		
National champion Postseason invitational champion Conference regular season champion Conference regular season and conference tournament champion Division regular season champion Division regular season and conference tournament champion Conference tournament champion

School	Season	Record	(Conf. Record)	Postseason
Total	?? years	?–?–?	(?–?–?)	0 Postseason bids

- Totals updated through the end of the 2010–2011 school year.

=== Head coaching history ===
#	Name	Years	Record
1	Tom Porten	2001–2006	?–?–?
2	Brian Varsey	2006–2007	?–?–?
3	Steve Weir	2007–	?–?–?

== Women's soccer ==
Regular season

- Horizon League Team Championships (0):

Tournament

- Horizon League Team Championships (0):

=== Record by year ===
Record table
Season	Coach	Overall	Conference	Standing	Postseason
Cleveland State (Horizon League) (2004–present)
2004	Derrek Falor	0–19–0	0–7–0	8th	
2005	Derrek Falor	0–18–1	0–6–1	8th	
2006	Derrek Falor	3–17–0	0–7–0	8th	
2006	Derrek Falor	3–17–0	0–7–0	8th	
2007	Derrek Falor	5–14–1	1–6–1	8th	
2008	Derrek Falor	8–10–1	3–4–1	6th	
2009	Derrek Falor	3–14–1	2–5–1	7th	
2010	Derrek Falor	9–8–2	5–3–0	T–3rd	
2011	Derrek Falor	10–7–2	3–3–2	T–4th	
2012	Derrek Falor	6–11–0	2–5–0	8th	
2013	Derrek Falor	8–9–1	2–5–0	T–6th	
2014	Sonia Curvelo	8–8–3	3–4–1	T–5th	
2015	Sonia Curvelo	8–10–1	4–5–0	6th	
2016	Sonia Curvelo	5–12–0	2–7–0	8th	
Total:		76–174–13	27-74–7		
National champion Postseason invitational champion Conference regular season champion Conference regular season and conference tournament champion Division regular season champion Division regular season and conference tournament champion Conference tournament champion

School	Season	Record	(Conf. Record)	Postseason
Total	13 years	76–174–13	(27–74–7)	0 Postseason bids

- Totals updated through the end of the 2016–2017 school year.

=== Head coaching history ===
#	Name	Years	Record
1	Derrek Falor	2004–2013	55–144–8
2	Sonia Curvelo	2014–2016	21–30–4

== Softball ==
Regular season

- North Star Conference Team Championships (0):
- Mid-Continent Conference Team Championships (0):
- Horizon League Team Championships (2):

2008, 2010

Tournament

- North Star Conference Team Championships (0):
- Mid-Continent Conference Team Championships (0):
- Horizon League Team Championships (3):

1997, 2009, 2024

=== Record by year ===
School	Season	Record	(Conf. Record)	Postseason
Cleveland State	1979	6–10	(N/A)	--
Cleveland State	1980	1–14	(?–?)	--
Cleveland State	1981	8–7	(?–?)	--
Cleveland State	1982	14–7	(?–?)	--
Cleveland State	1983	14–15–1	(?–?–?)	--
Cleveland State	1984	12–3	(?–?)	--
Cleveland State	1985	13–10	(?–?)	--
Cleveland State	1986	14–17	(?–?)	--
Cleveland State	1987	11–17	(?–?)	--
Cleveland State	1988	9–24	(?–?)	--
Cleveland State	1989	11–18–2	(?–?–?)	--
Cleveland State	1990	15–11	(?–?)	--
Cleveland State	1991	13–17	(?–?)	--
Cleveland State	1992	3–21	(?–?)	--
Cleveland State	1993	12–33	(3–13)	--
Cleveland State	1994	16–41	(4–14)	--
Cleveland State	1995	37–13	(13–3)	--
Cleveland State	1996	24–21	(6–8)	--
Cleveland State	1997	36–11	(11–3)	NCAA, Regionals
Cleveland State	1998	16–33	(3–9)	--
Cleveland State	1999	23–24	(8–4)	--
Cleveland State	2000	19–37	(4–6)	--
Cleveland State	2001	19–33	(3–9)	--
Cleveland State	2002	20–24–1	(3–9)	--
Cleveland State	2003	23–30–1	(6–6)	--
Cleveland State	2004	26–27	(6–11)	--
Cleveland State	2005	24–26	(13–6)	--
Cleveland State	2006	38–15	(10–5)	--
Cleveland State	2007	33–14	(8–6)	--
Cleveland State	2008	31–18	(14–4)	--
Cleveland State	2009	35–18	(17–5)	NCAA, Regionals
Cleveland State	2010	44–15	(22–2)	--
Cleveland State	2011	29–21	(13–8)	--
Cleveland State	2012	17–39	(9–15)	--
Total	33 years	666–684	(?–?)	2 Postseason bids

=== NCAA Championship history ===
Season	Eliminated Round	Teams Defeated	Lost to
1997	Regionals	–	Michigan; Michigan State
2009	Regionals	–	Notre Dame; Miami (Ohio)

=== Head coaching history ===
#	Name	Years	Record
1	Louise Furjanic	1979–1980	7–22–0
2	Ken Leckler	1981–1981	8–7–0
3	Alice Khol	1982–1983	28–22–1
4	Robin Sobelewski	1984–1984	12–3–0
5	Sue Welch	1985–1987	38–44–0
6	Mitch Wagner	1988–1989	20–42–2
7	Chico Chernosky	1990–1991	28–28–0
8	Tom McLaughlin	1992–1996	92–129–0
9	Julie Jones	1997–2006	244–260–2
10	Angie Nicholson	2007–	172–86–0

== Women's swimming & diving ==
- Penn-Ohio Conference Championships (2): 1990 and 1991
- Mid-Continent Conference Team Championships (0):
- Horizon League Team Championships (0):

=== Record by year ===
School	Season	Record	(Conf. Record)	Postseason
Cleveland State	1975	4–4–0	(N/A)	--
Cleveland State	1976	2–6–0	(N/A)	--
Cleveland State	1977	1–6–0	(N/A)	--
Cleveland State	1978	5–5–0	(N/A)	--
Cleveland State	1979	8–4–1	(N/A)	--
Cleveland State	1980	5–6–0	(N/A)	--
Cleveland State	1981	9–3–0	(N/A)	--
Cleveland State	1982	10–2–0	(N/A)	--
Cleveland State	1983	5–5–0	(N/A)	--
Cleveland State	1984	5–6–0	(N/A)	--
Cleveland State	1985	6–7–0	(N/A)	--
Cleveland State	1986	9–3–0	(N/A)	--
Cleveland State	1987	8–6–0	(N/A)	--
Cleveland State	1988	8–5–0	(?–?–?)	--
Cleveland State	1989	8–7–0	(?–?–?)	--
Cleveland State	1990	7–9–0	(?–?–?)	--
Cleveland State	1991	8–6–0	(?–?–?)	--
Cleveland State	1992	6–6–0	(?–?–?)	--
Cleveland State	1993	8–9–0	(?–?–?)	--
Cleveland State	1994	6–8–0	(?–?–?)	--
Cleveland State	1995	7–8–0	(?–?–?)	--
Cleveland State	1996	8–7–0	(?–?–?)	--
Cleveland State	1997	6–9–0	(?–?–?)	--
Cleveland State	1998	9–5–0	(?–?–?)	--
Cleveland State	1999	5–9–0	(?–?–?)	--
Cleveland State	2000	5–8–0	(?–?–?)	--
Cleveland State	2001	9–6–0	(?–?–?)	--
Cleveland State	2002	7–7–0	(?–?–?)	--
Cleveland State	2003	7–6–0	(?–?–?)	--
Cleveland State	2004	?–?–?	(?–?–?)	--
Cleveland State	2005	?–?–?	(?–?–?)	--
Cleveland State	2006	?–?–?	(?–?–?)	--
Cleveland State	2007	?–?–?	(?–?–?)	--
Total	?? years	?–?–?	(?–?–?)	0 Postseason bids

=== Head coaching history ===
#	Name	Years	Record
1	Susan Ziegler	1975–1976	4–4–0
2	Norman Burkhart	1976–1977	2–6–0
3	Susan Ziegler	1977–1978	1–6–0
4	Joyce Ferguson	1978–1980	13–9–1
5	Dave Duda	1980–1981	5–6–0
6	Debbie Dugan	1981–1982	9–3–0
7	Robert G. Kloos	1982–1983	10–2–0
8	Sue Neff	1983–1985	10–11–0
9	Lorry Wagner	1985–1991	46–37–0
10	John Collis	1991–1994	22–21–0
11	Mike Lehto	1994–2007	88–98–0
12	Wally Morton	2007–present	4–8–0

== Women's tennis ==
- North Star Conference Team Championships (0):
- Mid-Continent Conference Team Championships (0):
- Horizon League Team Championships (0):

=== Record by year ===
School	Season	Record	(Conf. Record)	Postseason
Cleveland State	1979	0–8	(?–?)	--
Cleveland State	1980	6–3	(?–?)	--
Cleveland State	1981	5–5	(?–?)	--
Cleveland State	1982	7–3	(?–?)	--
Cleveland State	1983	10–2	(?–?)	--
Cleveland State	1984	2–4	(?–?)	--
Cleveland State	1985	7–2	(?–?)	--
Cleveland State	1986	4–7	(?–?)	--
Cleveland State	1987	5–12	(?–?)	--
Cleveland State	1988	1–5	(?–?)	--
Cleveland State	1989	0–10	(?–?)	--
Cleveland State	1990	0–7	(?–?)	--
Cleveland State	1991	0–10	(?–?)	--
Cleveland State	1992	0–14	(?–?)	--
Cleveland State	1993	2–11	(?–?)	--
Cleveland State	1994	0–11	(?–?)	--
Cleveland State	1995	0–10	(?–?)	--
Cleveland State	1996	2–14	(?–?)	--
Cleveland State	1997	4–22	(?–?)	--
Cleveland State	1998	5–21	(?–?)	--
Cleveland State	1999	7–16	(?–?)	--
Cleveland State	2000	5–17	(?–?)	--
Cleveland State	2001	7–19	(?–?)	--
Cleveland State	2002	2–24	(?–?)	--
Cleveland State	2003	?–?	(?–?)	--
Cleveland State	2004	?–?	(?–?)	--
Cleveland State	2005	?–?	(?–?)	--
Cleveland State	2006	16–10	(4–3)	--
Cleveland State	2007	15–12	(4–3)	--
Cleveland State	2008	?–?	(?–?)	--
Cleveland State	2009	?–?	(?–?)	--
Cleveland State	2010	?–?	(?–?)	--
Cleveland State	2011	?–?	(?–?)	--
Cleveland State	2012	16–9	(7–1)	--
Total	34 years	?–?	(?–?)	0 Postseason bids

=== Head coaching history ===
#	Name	Years	Record
1	Jane Pease	1979–1980	0–8
2	Susan Ziegler	1980–1983	18–11
3	Sheryl Smith	1983–1986	19–8
4	Robert Malaga	1986–1989	10–24
5	John Bondea	1989–1991	0–17
6	Charles Mosley	1991–1995	2–46
7	Rick Kroboth	1995–1996	0–16
8	Dave Heilbron	1996–1997	2–8
9	Teresa Baker	1997–2001	21–76
10	Sandy Geringer	2001–2002	7–19
11	Brian Etzkin	2003—	2–24

== Women's track & field ==
- Women's Track & Field ceased to exist after the 199? season. It was reinstated beginning in 2017.

Outdoor track and field

- North Star Conference Team Championships (?):
- Horizon League Team Championships (0):

Indoor track and field

- North Star Conference Team Championships (?):
- Horizon League Team Championships (0):

== Women's volleyball ==
Regular season

- North Star Conference Team Championships (0):
- Mid-Continent Conference Team Championships (0):
- Horizon League Team Championships (4):

2009, 2012, 2015, 2016

Tournament

- North Star Conference Team Championships (0):
- Mid-Continent Conference Team Championships (0):
- Horizon League Team Championships (4):

2007, 2012, 2015, 2016

== Club sports – crew (rowing) ==
Viking Crew is a successful coed club crew. Each year the team travels around the nation to compete against other top collegiate crew. In 2006 the team's lightweight men's four traveled to Boston to race in the Head of the Charles Regatta. In 2007 and 2009 the team raced at Aberdeen Dad Vail Regatta with over 37 boats in their race. In 2009 Cleveland State won the Hammer Ergatta cup and the Cleveland Collegiate Regatta cup.

- Mid-America Collegiate Rowing Association Championships (0):
- Cleveland Collegiate Regatta Championships (1):
- Hammer Ergatta Championships (1):

=== Spring season regattas ===
#	Name	Location
1	Hammer Ergatta	Cleveland, OH
2	Cleveland Collegiate Regatta	Cleveland, OH
3	West Virginia Governor's Cup Regatta	Charleston, WV
4	Mid-America Collegiate Rowing Association Regatta	Athens, OH
5	Aberdeen Dad Vail Regatta	Philadelphia, PA

=== Fall season regattas ===
#	Name	Location
1	Head of the Cuyahoga	Cleveland, OH
2	Head of the Ohio	Pittsburgh, PA
3	Head of the Charles Regatta	Boston, MA
4	Speakmon Memorial	Columbus, OH

=== Head coaching history ===
#	Name	Years
1	Dan DiAngelo	2000–2004
2	Mark Silverstein	2004–2006
3	Ron Dorchak	2006–2008
4	David Dressler	2008–2010
