= Cleveland State Vikings men's golf =

- University: Cleveland State University
- Conference: Horizon
- Head coach: Men's: Steve Weir
- Location: Cleveland, Ohio
- Nickname: Vikings
- Colors: Forest green and white

Conference champions
- 1998, 2006, 2008, 2009, 2011, 2014, 2015, 2016, 2017, 2018

The Cleveland State Vikings men's golf team represents Cleveland State University in the sport of golf. The Vikings compete in Division I of the National Collegiate Athletic Association (NCAA) and the Horizon League. They are currently led by head coach Steve Weir. The Cleveland State Vikings men's golf program has won ten Horizon League championships. Cleveland State has the most men's golf titles in the history of the Horizon League at ten.

== Championships ==
- Mid-Continent Team Championships (0):
- Horizon League Team Championships (10): 1998, 2006, 2008–09, 2011, 2014–18

=== Record by year ===
School	Season	Record	(Conf. Record)	Postseason
Fenn College	1947	5–6–0	(?-?)	--
Fenn College	1948	6–5–0	(?-?)	--
Fenn College	1949	6–5–0	(?-?)	--
Fenn College	1950	5–6–0	(?-?)	--
Fenn College	1951	4–5–0	(?-?)	--
Fenn College	1952	2–9–0	(?-?)	--
Fenn College	1953	4–7–0	(?-?)	--
Fenn College	1954	3–6–0	(?-?)	--
Fenn College	1955	3–7–0	(?-?)	--
Fenn College	1956	7–3–1	(?-?)	--
Fenn College	1957	1–12–0	(?-?)	--
Fenn College	1958	5–7–0	(?-?)	--
Fenn College	1959	1–9–0	(?-?)	--
Fenn College	1960	2–6–2	(?-?)	--
Fenn College	1961	1–10–1	(?-?)	--
Fenn College	1962	2–6–0	(?-?)	--
Fenn College	1963	8–5–1	(?-?)	--
Fenn College	1964	2–9–1	(?-?)	--
Fenn College	1965	2–9–1	(?-?)	--
Total	?? years	?-?-?	(?-?-?)	0 Postseason bids

=== Head coaching history ===
#	Name	Years	Record
1	John McNeill	1947–1955	38–51–0
2	Homer E. Woodling	1956–1957	8–15–1
3	Robert F. Busbey	1958—?	?-?-?
?	Tom Porten	1991–2006	?-?-?
?	Steve Weir	200?—	?-?-?
