= Cleveland State Vikings men's tennis =

- University: Cleveland State University
- Head coach: Brian Etzkin (15th season)
- Conference: Horizon
- Location: Cleveland, Ohio, US
- Home Court: Medical Mutual Tennis Pavilion
- Nickname: Vikings
- Colors: Forest green and white

NCAA Tournament appearances
- 2008, 2009, 2010, 2011, 2013, 2018, 2019

Conference regular season champions
- 2008, 2009, 2010, 2011, 2013, 2018, 2019

The Cleveland State Vikings men's tennis team represents Cleveland State University in NCAA Division I college tennis. The team belongs to the Horizon League and plays home matches at the Medical Mutual Tennis Pavilion. The Vikings are currently led by head coach Brian Etzkin. Cleveland State dropped tennis as a sport following the 1991–1992 school year. Tennis was brought back for the 1999–2000 school year.

== Championships ==
- Mid-Continent Conference Team Championships (0):
- Horizon League Team Championships (7):

2008, 2009, 2010, 2011, 2013, 2018, 2019

== Record by year ==
School	Season	Record	(Conf. Record)	Postseason
Fenn College	1932	1–1–1	(N/A)	--
Fenn College	1933	1–4–0	(N/A)	--
Fenn College	1934	3–1–2	(N/A)	--
Fenn College	1935	N/A	(N/A)	--
Fenn College	1936	N/A	(N/A)	--
Fenn College	1937	N/A	(N/A)	--
Fenn College	1938	N/A	(N/A)	--
Fenn College	1939	N/A	(N/A)	--
Fenn College	1940	1–4–1	(N/A)	--
Fenn College	1941	6–4–0	(N/A)	--
Fenn College	1942	3–4–0	(N/A)	--
Fenn College	1943	N/A	(N/A)	--
Fenn College	1944	N/A	(N/A)	--
Fenn College	1945	N/A	(N/A)	--
Fenn College	1946	N/A	(N/A)	--
Fenn College	1947	5–6–0	(N/A)	--
Fenn College	1948	1–9–0	(N/A)	--
Fenn College	1949	3–9–0	(N/A)	--
Fenn College	1950	2–9–0	(N/A)	--
Fenn College	1951	9–2–0	(N/A)	--
Fenn College	1952	10–1–0	(N/A)	--
Fenn College	1953	8–5–0	(N/A)	--
Fenn College	1954	10–1–0	(N/A)	--
Fenn College	1955	3–9–0	(N/A)	--
Fenn College	1956	9–1–0	(N/A)	--
Fenn College	1957	2–8–0	(N/A)	--
Fenn College	1958	1–9–0	(N/A)	--
Fenn College	1959	2–8–0	(N/A)	--
Fenn College	1960	1–8–0	(N/A)	--
Fenn College	1961	1–6–0	(N/A)	--
Fenn College	1962	2–8–0	(N/A)	--
Fenn College	1963	1–10–0	(N/A)	--
Fenn College	1964	2–6–0	(N/A)	--
Fenn College	1965	2–7–0	(N/A)	--
Cleveland State	1966	2–6–0	(?-?)	--
Cleveland State	1967	0–11–0	(?-?)	--
Cleveland State	1968	1–10–0	(?-?)	--
Cleveland State	1969	7–6–0	(?-?)	--
Cleveland State	1970	5–9–0	(?-?)	--
Cleveland State	1971	5–6–0	(?-?)	--
Cleveland State	1972	7–5–0	(?-?)	--
Cleveland State	1973	3–7–0	(?-?)	--
Cleveland State	1974	8–2–0	(?-?)	--
Cleveland State	1975	6–4–0	(?-?)	--
Cleveland State	1976	0–10–0	(?-?)	--
Cleveland State	1977	1–8–0	(?-?)	--
Cleveland State	1978	5–5–0	(?-?)	--
Cleveland State	1979	5–4–0	(?-?)	--
Cleveland State	1980	3–7–0	(?-?)	--
Cleveland State	1981	4–11–0	(?-?)	--
Cleveland State	1982	13–7–0	(?-?)	--
Cleveland State	1983	2–7–0	(?-?)	--
Cleveland State	1984	4–4–0	(?-?)	--
Cleveland State	1985	8–4–0	(?-?)	--
Cleveland State	1986	3–16–0	(?-?)	--
Cleveland State	1987	2–9–0	(?-?)	--
Cleveland State	1988	9–14–0	(?-?)	--
Cleveland State	1989	18–10–0	(?-?)	--
Cleveland State	1990	0–16–0	(?-?)	--
Cleveland State	1991	0–10–0	(?-?)	--
Cleveland State	1992	1–12–0	(?-?)	--
Cleveland State	1993	N/A	(N/A)	--
Cleveland State	1994	N/A	(N/A)	--
Cleveland State	1995	N/A	(N/A)	--
Cleveland State	1996	N/A	(N/A)	--
Cleveland State	1997	N/A	(N/A)	--
Cleveland State	1998	N/A	(N/A)	--
Cleveland State	1999	N/A	(N/A)	--
Cleveland State	2000	1–16–0	(?-?)	--
Cleveland State	2001	2–17–0	(?-?)	--
Cleveland State	2002	9–19–0	(?-?)	--
Cleveland State	2003	?-?-?	(?-?)	--
Cleveland State	2004	?-?-?	(?-?)	--
Cleveland State	2005	?-?-?	(?-?)	--
Cleveland State	2006	10–12–0	(2–3)	--
Cleveland State	2007	18–8–0	(4–1)	--
Cleveland State	2008	20–6–0	(7–0)	NCAA Tournament
Cleveland State	2009	20–7–0	(7–0)	NCAA Tournament
Cleveland State	2010	21–6–0	(7–0)	NCAA Tournament
Cleveland State	2011	14–7–0	(7–0)	NCAA Tournament
Cleveland State	2012	12–12–0	(4–3)	
Cleveland State	2013	15-8-0	(5–1)	NCAA Tournament
Cleveland State	2014	17-8-0	(4–2)	
Cleveland State	2015	14-12-0	(2–4)	
Cleveland State	2016	10-17-0	(2–5)	
Cleveland State	2017	17-11-0	(6–1)	NCAA Tournament
Cleveland State	2018	19-8-0	(6–0)	NCAA Tournament
Cleveland State	2019	6-6-0	(0-0)	
Total	?? years	?-?-?	(?-?)	4 Postseason bids

== NCAA Tournament history ==
Season	Eliminated Round	Teams Defeated	Lost To
2008	First Round	–	Ohio State
2009	First Round	–	Kentucky
2010	First Round	–	Kentucky
2011	First Round	–	Kentucky
2013	First Round	–	Ohio State
2018	First Round	–	Michigan
2019	First Round	–	Ohio State

== Head coaching history ==
#	Name	Years	Record
1	Homer E. Woodling	1932–1934	3–6–3
2	William Patterson	1940–1942	10–12–1
3	Homer E. Woodling	1947—1947	5–6–0
4	Foster Miller	1948–1955	46–45–0
5	Richard Gulbenkian	1956—1956	9–1–0
6	Homer E. Woodling	1957—1957	2–8–0
7	Charles Simonian	1958—1958	1–9–0
8	Bill Gallagher	1959—1959	2–8–0
9	Homer E. Woodling	1960–1965	9–45–0
10	George Ficken	1966—1966	2–6–0
11	James Carpenter	1967—1967	0–11–0
12	William Clarke	1968–1972	25–36–0
13	Klass DeBoer	1973–1977	18–31–0
14	James Malone	1978–1979	10–9–0
15	Steve Parker	1980—1980	3–7–0
16	John Luoma	1981–1983	19–25–0
17	Dick Kenney	1984—1984	4–4–0
18	Robert Malaga	1985–1989	40–53–0
19	John Bondea	1990–1992	1–38–0
20	Teresa Baker	2000—2000	1–16–0
21	Sandy Geringer	2001—2001	2–17–0
22	Brian Etzkin	2002—	81–69–0 (men's)
