= Reynolds Coliseum =

Multi-purpose arena in Raleigh, North Carolina, U.S.

- "The House that Case Built"
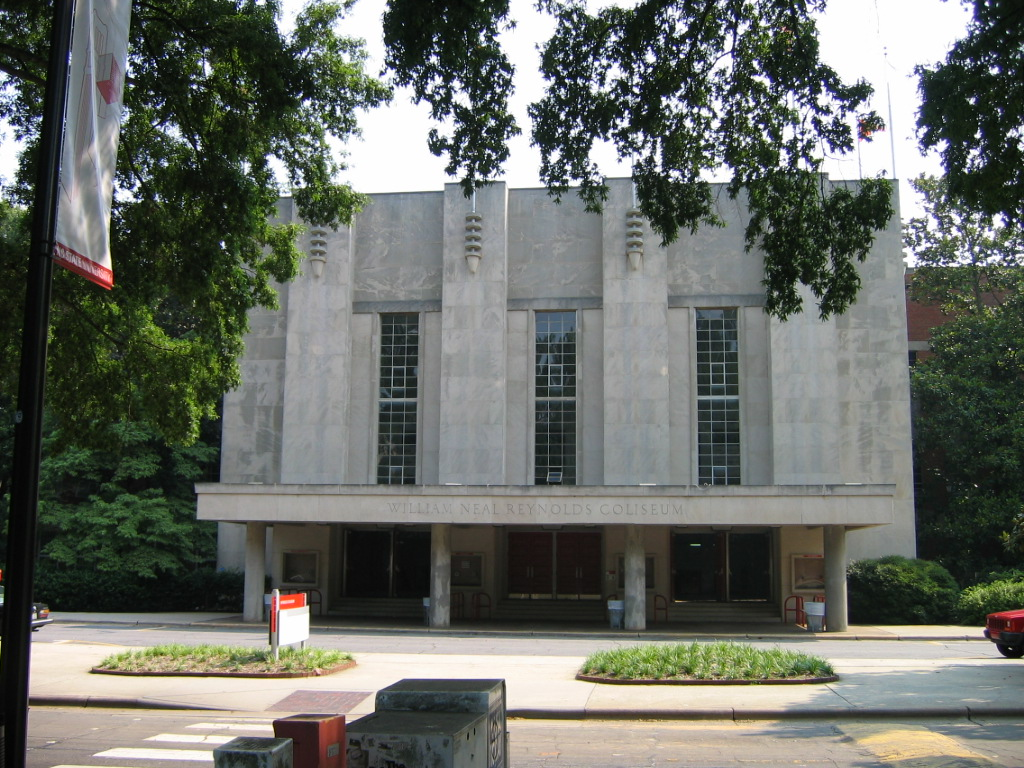
- Interactive map of Reynolds Coliseum
- Location: 103 Dunn Ave; North Carolina State Univ. Raleigh, North Carolina
- Coordinates: 35.783°N 78.670°W
- Owner: North Carolina State Univ.
- Operator: North Carolina State Univ.
- Capacity: 14,000 concerts 12,400 basketball, former 5,500 basketball, current 3,900 hockey

Construction
- Groundbreaking: 1942
- Opened: December 2, 1949
- Renovated: 2015–2016
- Cost: $35 million

Tenants
- North Carolina State Wolfpack (NCAA); Men's basketball (1949–1999); Women's basketball (1974–present); Wrestling, volleyball, gymnastics Army ROTC, Navy and Marine Corps ROTC, Air Force ROTC

William Neal Reynolds Coliseum is a multi-purpose arena located in Raleigh, North Carolina, United States, on the campus of North Carolina State University. The arena was built to host a variety of events, including agricultural expositions and NC State basketball games. It is now home to all services of ROTC and several Wolfpack teams, including women's basketball, women's volleyball, women's gymnastics, and men's wrestling. The university named the court in Reynolds "Kay Yow Court" on February 16, 2007, with the assistance of a substantial donation from the Wolfpack Club. Following a donation in 2018, the facility is now officially named James T. Valvano Arena at Reynolds Coliseum, in honor of the national championship-winning Wolfpack men's basketball coach.

== History ==
NC State alumnus David Clark originally petitioned for the construction of the arena in 1940 after rain had ruined a North Carolina Farmers' Week meeting held in an outdoor facility. The North Carolina General Assembly approved plans for the coliseum. A steel shortage threatened to delay the construction of the coliseum. However, because the proposed coliseum was also to be used as an armory, the "steel for the structure received a defense priority." Construction began in 1942. The foundation work and structural steel support system was completed by 1943 but construction was stopped due to US involvement in World War II. After the war the university was preoccupied with the building of housing and classroom facilities and the unfinished coliseum was left untouched until construction resumed in 1948. The arena was completed the following year and named in honor of William Neal Reynolds (1863–1951) of Winston-Salem.

The arena was originally intended to seat 10,000 people, but while the building was still under construction, newly hired head basketball coach Everett Case urged the administration to add an additional 2,400 seats, bringing capacity to 12,400. This was accomplished by expanding the structure at each end. It was the largest arena in the Southeast for many years.

The first men's basketball game was played on December 2, 1949, against Washington & Lee University. NC State defeated Washington and Lee, 67–47. Not all the seats had been installed at that time and many fans had to sit on the "cement tiers." The first women's basketball game was played on December 7, 1974. Men's basketball moved to the Raleigh Entertainment and Sports Arena in 1999. The Wolfpack men have played a December regular-season "heritage" game at Reynolds Coliseum in recent years, and the arena hosted 2019 NIT first and second-round games against Hofstra and Harvard on March 19 and March 24.

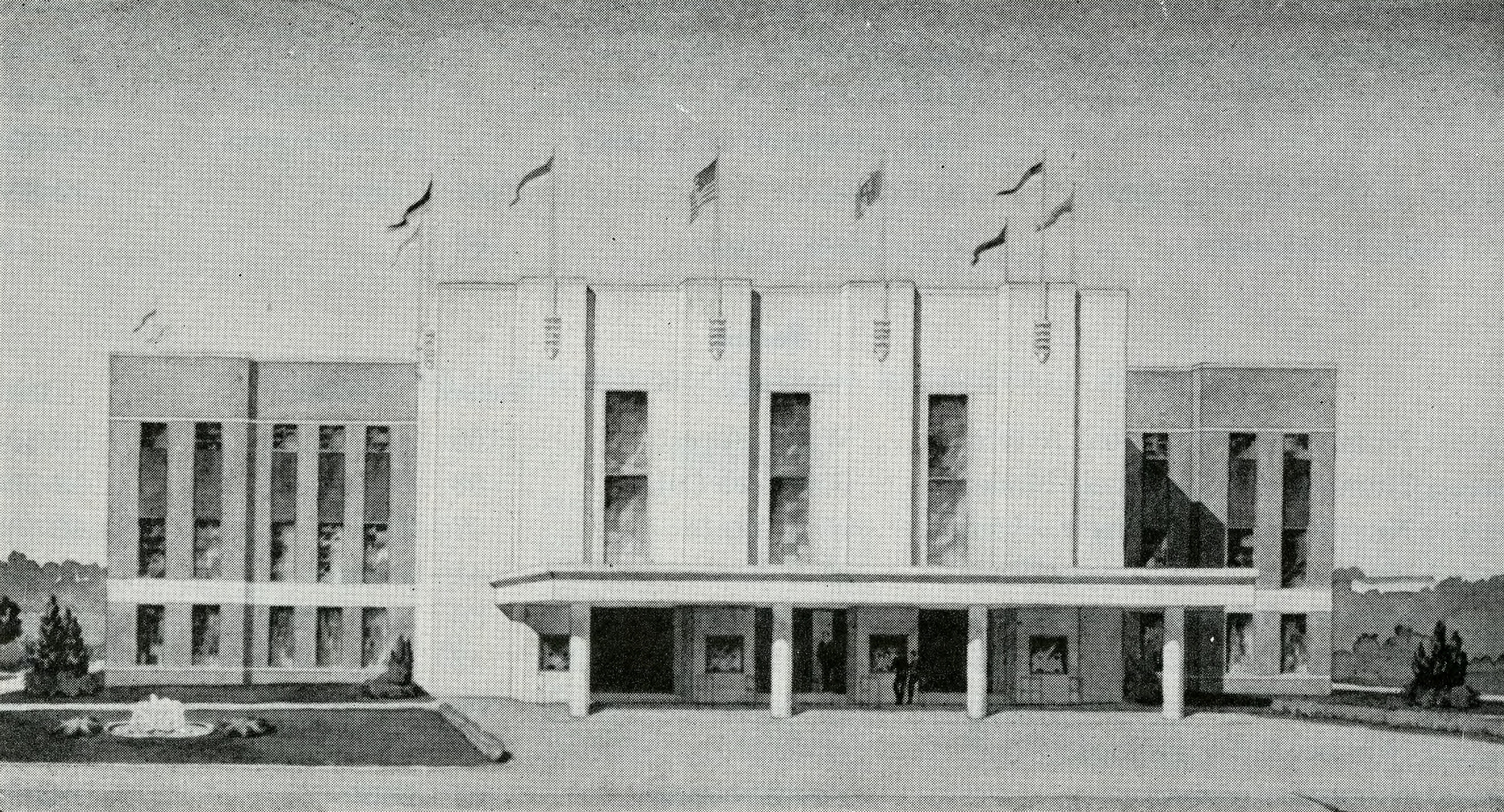
Reynolds Coliseum circa 1953

Reynolds was the original site of the ACC men's basketball tournament from 1954 to 1966, the Dixie Classic tournament from 1949 to 1960, and the Southern Conference men's basketball tournament (1951–1953). It has hosted the NCAA men's basketball tournament as a Regional site eight times, and as a subregional (first and second-round games) four times. It has also hosted the women's basketball tournament eleven times, only one of which was a regional site. The ACC women's basketball tournament was held there twice, in 1979 and 1982. March 1982, in fact, was a very busy month for the arena: it hosted the ACC women's tournament, NCAA men's subregional, and NCAA women's regional all in succession.

It was considered to be one of the toughest places to play in the Atlantic Coast Conference. When ESPN asked contributors who played college basketball to identify the toughest arena they ever played in, former Duke center Jay Bilas and former North Carolina guard Hubert Davis chose Reynolds.

Jay Bilas: "To me, the toughest places to play had more to do with the quality of the opposing team than anything else, but Reynolds Coliseum at NC State was the toughest place I played while in college. Reynolds was configured much the same way as Cameron Indoor Stadium, but the end zones were much deeper and the sides were right on top of you. Reynolds was loud, edgy and intense. The Wolfpack under Jim Valvano were a tough out and the games were always fistfights, but the thing I remember most is coming back to a huddle and seeing lips move, but not being able to hear what was said. It was so hot and loud that your head would spin. Of course, having to guard guys like Thurl Bailey, Lorenzo Charles, Cozell McQueen and Chris Washburn probably had something to do with my head spinning."

Hubert Davis: "The toughest place I ever played was Reynolds Coliseum, former home of the NC State Wolfpack. Cameron Indoor Stadium and Cole Field House don't even come close. I remember the long walk from the locker room to the floor. You had to enter under the bleachers and then had to sprint to the floor so that the fans wouldn't throw soda on us. The end zone seating went back as far as I've ever seen – the sea of red just never seemed to end. In the four years I played there as a Tar Heel, I never scored on the opposite basket away from our bench in the first half. I eventually calmed down, but was always flustered in those first 20 minutes. It was that intimidating."

In May 2005, the arena was damaged by a small fire. Damage was minimal, and crews quickly repaired the structure.

Renovations were completed in 2005 that added new lighting, a new sound system, and new separate floors for basketball and volleyball. The new sound system proved to be inadequate, and was reworked in 2008. Because of the unusually long floor area, the volleyball court was able to fit in the north end of the coliseum perpendicular to the basketball court. The basketball area of the coliseum was curtained off or blocked off with temporary bleachers during volleyball matches. During basketball games temporary bleachers were rolled out over the volleyball floor, as well as over the open area on the south end of the court.

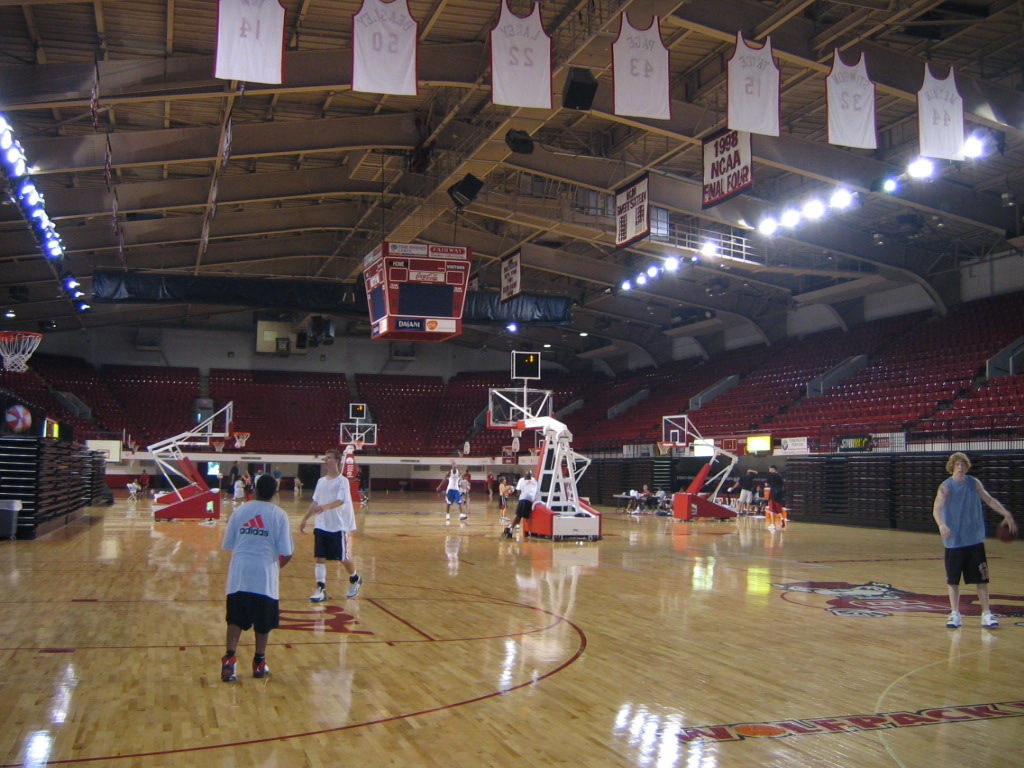
The look of the court before renovation

The arena was closed in March 2015 for extensive remodeling, which cost an estimated $35 million. The project moved the competition floor to the south end of the arena while lowering the seating capacity to 5,500 (it can be a bit higher for festival events). The north end of the building features a new Walk of Fame and History, including a permanent home for the NC State Athletic Hall of Fame, as well as offices for women's basketball and volleyball. Restrooms, concessions and hospitality areas were renovated and concourses were widened. A new video control room for all sports was added. For the first time, the entire arena is air-conditioned.

NC State's volleyball team was the first to play at home in the newly renovated Reynolds on September 9, 2016, defeating Delaware 3–0.

Men's basketball	
Southern Conference Champions	1949 • 1950 • 1951 • 1952
ACC Champions	1954 • 1955 • 1956 • 1959 • 1965 • 1970 • 1973 • 1974 • 1983 • 1987
NCAA titles	1974 • 1983

Women's basketball	
ACC Regular Season Champions	1978 • 1980 • 1983 • 1985 • 1990
ACC Tournament Champions	1980 • 1985 • 1987 • 1991

== Configuration ==
The building's arena floor measures 108 by 312 feet (33 m × 95 m). Originally, it seated 12,400 for basketball and 14,000 for concerts. Besides the building's long dimensions, another recognizable feature of the building is the floor-level bleacher seating, which is noticeably separate from the arena's main seating sections, a feature copied in the building of the PNC Arena. The building's exterior dimensions are 180 by 371 feet (55 m × 113 m).

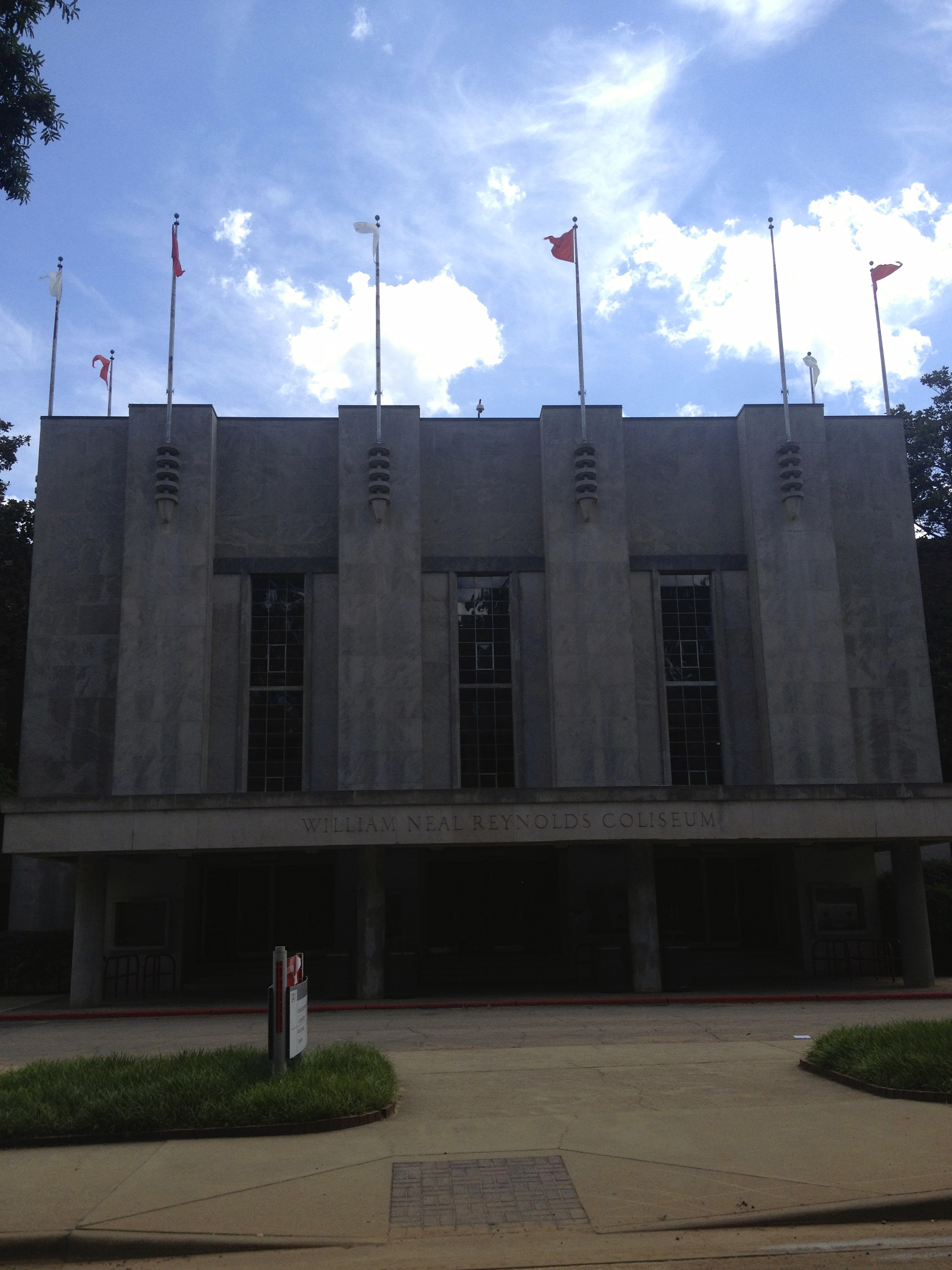
Reynolds Coliseum

== PA announcer ==
C. A. Dillon was the public address announcer for the men's basketball games (including games of the Southern Conference, ACC, Dixie Classic and NCAA basketball tournaments) during the entire 50-year run of men's basketball in the arena. Bob Ferrone started as the PA announcer for women's basketball in 1975, the same year Kay Yow began her award-winning 34-year career as coach of the Wolfpack Women. He continued, assisted by his wife Jan, for 27 years, rarely missing a game at Reynolds Coliseum.

Currently, women's basketball is announced by Ed Funkhouser. For eleven years, volleyball was announced by Vance Elderkin.

For many years, the arena housed an organ that was played before and after games and at halftimes. During the years in which Norm Sloan was the Wolfpack's head coach, his wife Joan sang the National Anthem before tip-offs.

== Special events ==
The arena hosted games for the Carolina Cougars of the American Basketball Association during some but not all of their time in North Carolina from 1969 through 1974.

The arena also hosts annual N.C. State homecoming events, particularly concerts, featuring artists such as Def Leppard, Van Halen, Lonestar, Chris Daughtry, Ludacris & Crossfade, and hip hop artist T.I. It also played host to many Raleigh area high school graduation ceremonies, though most now take place at the Raleigh Convention Center.

Historically, Reynolds served as the host for many campus concerts and special events. Alabama, Elton John, The Rolling Stones, Louis Armstrong, Loverboy, Logan Paul, The Kingston Trio and Huey Lewis & The News have all performed in Reynolds. Additionally, former presidents Ronald Reagan, Bill Clinton, and Barack Obama have addressed students, faculty, and campus visitors in the coliseum.

On February 24, 2015, Phish released a live recording of their 12/16/99 concert from Reynolds Coliseum on LivePhish.com.

On November 7, 2016, presidential candidate Hillary Clinton held her last rally before the 2016 United States presidential election at the Reynolds Coliseum. Former President Bill Clinton also appeared at the event as well as Lady Gaga & Bon Jovi. Lady Gaga delivered a speech before joining Bon Jovi in a live performance.

On March 10, 2018, Reynolds Coliseum hosted the NCHSAA 3A Men's Basketball Championship. The game saw the Cox Mill Chargers men's basketball team take home their second straight State Championship.

On September 14, 2025, Cleveland State Vikings women's volleyball won against the Duke Blue Devils for the first time in program history.

== See also ==
- List of NCAA Division I basketball arenas
