= Mike Thomas (athletic director) =

American college athletics administrator

Biographical details
- Born: Pueblo, Colorado, U.S.
- Education: Colorado State University BS '83; Western Illinois University MA '86

Administrative career (AD unless noted)
- 2000–2005: Akron
- 2005–2011: Cincinnati
- 2011–2015: Illinois
- 2017–2018: Cleveland State

Michael J. Thomas is an American university administrator, and the former athletic director at Cleveland State University. Thomas was previously athletic director at the University of Illinois from 2011 to 2015, University of Cincinnati from 2005 to 2011, and the University of Akron from 2000 to 2005. Previously, he served as an associate athletic director at the University of Virginia and the University of Denver, and spent a year at the University of Iowa as an administrative intern.

Twice during his career Thomas has won the Robert R. Neyland Outstanding Athletics Director Award, once in 2005 while at Akron, and again in April 2008 while at Cincinnati.

== Early life, education and family ==
Thomas was born in Pueblo, Colorado and graduated from Pueblo South High School in 1978. He earned his bachelor's degree in business administration from Colorado State University in 1983, and his master's degree in physical education and athletic administration from Western Illinois University in 1986.

Thomas is married to the former Jeni Arends from Manchester, Iowa, and has four adult children.

== Career ==
=== Early career ===
Prior to his time at Akron, he was associate athletics director at the University of Virginia and also served on the athletics staffs at the University of Denver and the University of Iowa.

=== University of Akron ===
Thomas was named director of athletics at the University of Akron in October 2000. Under his direction, Akron rose from last place to second among MAC schools in the Director's Cup rankings, and simultaneously rose from last to second place in the MAC academic achievement awards. He increased corporate sponsorship levels by 750%. Additionally, Thomas launched the building of a new on campus football stadium and secured $20 million in individual and corporate gifts for the project. Thomas replaced Lee Owens, the football coach, with JD Brookhart. The Zips went on to win their first MAC football championship. Thomas' hire of men's basketball coach Keith Dambrot has led to unparalleled success, including eight postseason appearances in the last ten years.

In 2005 Thomas was awarded the General Robert R. Neyland Outstanding Athletic Director Award from the All-American Football Foundation.

=== University of Cincinnati ===
The University of Cincinnati named Thomas as its athletic director on October 20, 2005. Thomas was charged with the competitive rebuilding of the Bearcats Program by then President Nancy Zimpher. During his tenure in Cincinnati, Thomas hired men's basketball coach Mick Cronin, and football head coaches Brian Kelly and Butch Jones. Cincinnati Football enjoyed the greatest success in its history under these coaches, winning several Big East titles and advancing to the school's only BCS Bowl Games in the 2009 FedEx Orange Bowl and the 2010 Allstate Sugar Bowl, which capped the undefeated 12–0 regular season.

While holding the role of director of athletics, Thomas increased the university's donor base by 180% and raised $70 million for the annual fund, capital projects, and endowments. Thomas secured and expanded a regional television agreement with FOX Sports, which substantially increased coverage for football, men's basketball, and women's basketball. He also increased football season ticket sales and revenue by more than 300%. Lastly, under Thomas's leadership the university experienced an increase in annual student-athletes on Big East Academic All-Star Team from 124 to 218. In 2009, Thomas was honored to receive the Sports Executive of the Year Award from the Cincinnati Sports Professional Network. In 2008, Thomas was awarded for the second time the General Robert R. Neyland Outstanding Athletic Director Award from the All-American Football Foundation.

Thomas increased the graduate success rate and the APR, and under his direction UC was one of the leaders in the Big East conference for academic success. Membership in the school's athletic fundraising arm increased by almost 300% under Thomas' tenure, and funds were raised for several capital projects. He was recognized as the Cincinnati Sports Executive of the Year in 2010.

=== University of Illinois ===
Thomas was named director of athletics at the University of Illinois in August 2011. During his first year at Illinois he replaced the football coach and both the men's and women's basketball coaches. Thomas launched the $170-million State Farm Center renovation project, including a landmark $60-million naming rights agreement that was the largest for a college-only venue in the country.

Under Thomas's leadership, the University of Illinois won Big Ten championships in all four 2015 men's spring sports: baseball, tennis, track and field, and golf. Thomas was also responsible for leading the Illinois Big Ten athletic program to bowl and NCAA tournament appearances and Top Ten national finishes in baseball, volleyball, men's golf, men's track and field, men's tennis, wrestling, and men's gymnastics. While Thomas was the director of athletics at UI, he put staff and programs in place that elevated the overall student-athlete GPA average from 3.05 to 3.25 and increased annual student-athlete community service hours from 5,000 to 7,000. In 2015, Thomas received the Western Illinois University Alumni Achievement Award and in 2014, he was awarded the University of Illinois Award for Communications and Marketing Excellence.

Thomas also led several other facility projects, including enhancements to Memorial Stadium and Huff Hall, and the construction of a new outdoor golf facility. Thomas signed a 10-year, $60-million dollar contract with Learfield Sports and guided Illinois through an 18-month collaboration with Nike, resulting in all new marks and branding.

On November 9, 2015, Thomas was fired via a without cause contractual clause from the University of Illinois. Most speculate it was tied to Tim Beckman and the treatment of the football team.

=== Cleveland State University ===
Thomas was named director of athletics at Cleveland State University on February 8, 2017.
