= Dorothy Miller =

American politician (1920–2008)

Member of the Connecticut House of Representatives from the 55th district
- In office 1977–1979
- Preceded by: Aloysius Ahearn
- Succeeded by: Aloysius Ahearn
- In office 1973–1975
- Preceded by: Bernard P. Auger
- Succeeded by: Aloysius Ahearn

Member of the Connecticut House of Representatives from the 51st district
- In office 1969–1973
- Preceded by: Walter L. Thorp Sr.
- Succeeded by: Bernard P. Auger

Member of the Connecticut House of Representatives from Bolton
- In office 1959–1963
- Preceded by: Eugene Gagliardone
- Succeeded by: Eugene Gagliardone

Personal details
- Born: Dorothy Risley; April 1, 1920 East Hartford, Connecticut, U.S.
- Died: April 22, 2008 (aged 88)
- Party: Republican
- Spouse: Robert A. Miller
- Children: 1

Dorothy Miller (April 1, 1920 – April 22, 2008) was an American politician who served in the Connecticut House of Representatives. A Republican, Miller represented the town of Bolton from 1959 to 1963, the 51st district from 1969 to 1973, and the 55th district from 1973 to 1975 and 1977 to 1979.

== Personal life ==
Dorothy Risley was born on April 1, 1920, in East Hartford, Connecticut. She was married to Robert A. Miller, and they had one daughter. In 1984, Miller moved from Connecticut to Vernon, Vermont.

== Political career ==
In 1958, Miller was elected to represent Bolton in the Connecticut House of Representatives, defeating Democratic candidate Vincent Krzesicki. She served two terms and was succeeded by her predecessor, fellow Republican Eugene Gagliardone.

Following Connecticut's 1965 constitutional convention, the state redistricted, replacing its single-town districts with numbered, population-based districts. In 1968, Miller was elected to represent the 51st district. She served two terms. In 1972, Connecticut again redistricted, and Miller was elected to represent the 55th district. She served one term and ran for reelection in 1974, but was defeated by Aloysius Ahearn. In 1976, she won reelection against Ahearn and served from 1977 to 1979. She ran for reelection in 1978, but was again defeated by Ahearn.

After moving to Vernon, Vermont, Miller worked as a justice of the peace.

== Death ==
Miller died on April 22, 2008. She was 88.
