= Woodling Gym =

Sports venue in Cleveland, Ohio

- Interactive map of Woodling Gym
- Full name: Woodling Gymnasium
- Location: Cleveland, Ohio
- Coordinates: 41.503355°N 81.671269°W
- Owner: Cleveland State University
- Operator: Cleveland State University
- Capacity: 3,000

Construction
- Opened: 1973

Tenants
- Cleveland State Vikings (NCAA); Men's basketball (1973–1991); Women's basketball (1973–1991); Men's fencing (1973–present); Women's fencing (1973–present); Women's volleyball (1973–present); Wrestling (1973–2025)

Woodling Gymnasium is a gym on the campus of Cleveland State University in Cleveland. It is located inside CSU's Physical Education Building, which also includes the Robert Busby Natatorium and offices for the CSU Physical Education Department. Woodling Gym seats 3,000 people and is the home court for the Cleveland State Vikings women's volleyball and men's and women's fencing teams. It was also the home of the Cleveland State Vikings men's basketball and women's basketball teams from its opening in 1973 until the Wolstein Center opened in 1991, and of the Cleveland State wrestling team until 2025. It is still occasionally used for men's and women's basketball games.

The gym was the first on-campus home for CSU athletics. Prior to construction of the Physical Education Building, sports teams from CSU and its predecessor Fenn College played in a variety of other facilities throughout Cleveland, including Cathedral Latin High School, Cleveland Arena, and Public Hall. Woodling Gym is named after Homer E. Woodling, who served as head coach of the men's basketball team when the school was known as Fenn College, and also served as Fenn College's first and only athletic director. He continued as athletic director during the transition to Cleveland State, serving as CSU's first athletic director until 1966. The gym was dedicated on October 20, 1973.
