= Connecticut's 55th House of Representatives district =

American legislative district

Connecticut's 55th State House of Representatives district
Representative
Steve Weir; R

Connecticut's 55th House of Representatives district elects one member of the Connecticut House of Representatives. It consists of the towns of Andover, Bolton, Hebron, and Marlborough. It has been represented by Republican Steve Weir since 2022.

== List of representatives ==
List of Representatives from Connecticut's 55th House District
Representative	Party	Years	District home	Note
Wilfred A. LaFleur	Democratic	1967–1971	Thompson	Seat created
Bernard P. Auger	Democratic	1971–1973	Putnam	
Dorothy Miller	Republican	1973–1975	Bolton	
Aloysius Ahearn	Democratic	1975–1977	Bolton	
Dorothy Miller	Republican	1977–1979	Bolton	
Aloysius Ahearn	Democratic	1979–1981	Bolton	
J. Peter Fusscas	Republican	1981–1993	Marlborough	
Pamela Sawyer	Republican	1993–2015	Bolton	
Gayle Mulligan	Republican	2015–2017	Hebron	
Robin Green	Republican	2017–2023	Marlborough	
Steve Weir	Republican	2023–	Hebron	
Ellen Paul	Democratic	2027 member-elect		

== Recent elections ==
=== 2020 ===
2020 Connecticut State House of Representatives election, District 55
Party	Candidate	Votes	%
Republican	Robin Green (incumbent)	7,491	49.05
Democratic	John Collins	7,125	46.65
Petitioning	Salvatore V. Sena Jr.	656	4.30
Total votes		15,272	100.00
Republican hold			

=== 2018 ===
2018 Connecticut House of Representatives election, District 55
Party	Candidate	Votes	%
Republican	Robin Green (Incumbent)	6,668	54.7
Democratic	Tiffany Thiele	5,532	45.3
Total votes		12,200	100.00
Republican hold			

=== 2016 ===
2016 Connecticut House of Representatives election, District 55
Party	Candidate	Votes	%
Republican	Robin Green	9,466	100.00
Total votes		9,466	100.00
Republican hold			

=== 2014 ===
2014 Connecticut House of Representatives election, District 55
Party	Candidate	Votes	%
Republican	Gayle Mulligan	6,181	60.6
Democratic	Joseph A. LaBella	3,516	34.5
Independent Party	Gayle Mulligan (Incumbent)	502	4.9
Total votes		10,199	100.00
Republican hold			

=== 2012 ===
2012 Connecticut House of Representatives election, District 55
Party	Candidate	Votes	%
Republican	Pamela Sawyer (Incumbent)	9,249	73.0
Democratic	Richard Marzi	3,425	27.00
Total votes		12,674	100.00
Republican hold			
