= Aloysius Ahearn =

American politician and educator (c.1926–2020)

Member of the Connecticut House of Representatives from the 55th district
- In office 1975–1977
- Preceded by: Dorothy Miller
- Succeeded by: Dorothy Miller
- In office 1979–1981
- Preceded by: Dorothy Miller
- Succeeded by: J. Peter Fusscas

Personal details
- Born: c. 1926 Boston, Massachusetts, U.S.
- Died: April 30, 2020 Manchester, Connecticut, U.S.
- Party: Democratic

Aloysius J. Ahearn (c. 1926 – April 30, 2020) was an American politician and educator. Ahearn served in the Connecticut House of Representatives from 1975 to 1977 and again from 1979 until 1981 as a member of the Democratic Party.

Ahearn was born in Boston, Massachusetts, to Felix and Anna (née McCarron) Ahearn. He served in the United States Army during World War II and the Korean War. Ahearn taught at English at East Hartford High School from 1960 to 1991, as well as at Manchester Community College during his career as an educator.

In 2007, Ahearn published his memoir, From Rags To Patches, which explored his childhood in Boston during the Great Depression.

Aloysius Ahearn died at Manchester Memorial Hospital in Manchester, Connecticut, on April 30, 2020, at the age of 94. Ahearn, a longtime resident of Bolton, Connecticut, had been married to the late Lorna Ahearn, with whom he had two sons, Peter and Michael.
