= Connecticut's 51st House of Representatives district =

American legislative district

Connecticut's 51st State House of Representatives district
Representative
Chris Stewart; R

Connecticut's 51st House of Representatives district elects one member of the Connecticut House of Representatives. It consists of the towns of Putnam, Thompson, and parts of Killingly. It has been represented by Republican Chris Stewart since 2025.

== List of representatives ==
List of representatives from Connecticut's 51st House district
Representative	Party	Years	District home	Note
Walter L. Thorp Sr.	Republican	1967–1969	Coventry	Seat created
Dorothy Miller	Republican	1969–1973	Bolton	
Bernard P. Auger	Democratic	1973–1975	Putnam	
Kevin P. Johnston	Democratic	1975–1985	Putnam	
Theodore A. Gagne Jr.	Republican	1985–1987	Thompson	
Geri W. Langlois	Democratic	1987–1993	Thompson	
Douglas Cutler Jr.	Republican	1993–1995	Putnam	
Shawn T. Johnston	Democratic	1995–2011	Putnam	
Daniel Rovero	Democratic	2011–2019	Putnam	
Rick Hayes	Republican	2019–2025	Putnam	
Chris Stewart	Republican	2025–	Putnam	

== Recent elections ==
=== 2020 ===
2020 Connecticut State House of Representatives election, District 51
Party	Candidate	Votes	%
Republican	Rick Hayes (incumbent)	6,158	53.30
Democratic	Larry Groh Jr.	4,961	42.94
Independent Party	Rick Hayes (incumbent)	435	3.76
Total votes		11,554	100.00
Republican hold			

=== 2018 ===
2018 Connecticut House of Representatives election, District 51
Party	Candidate	Votes	%
Republican	Rick Hayes	4,428	53.3
Democratic	Larry Groh Jr.	3,877	46.7
Total votes		8,305	100.00
Republican gain from Democratic			

=== 2016 ===
2016 Connecticut House of Representatives election, District 51
Party	Candidate	Votes	%
Democratic	Daniel Rovaro (Incumbent)	5,548	57.94
Republican	Brian Lynch	4,028	42.06
Total votes		9,576	100.00
Democratic hold			

=== 2014 ===
2014 Connecticut House of Representatives election, District 51
Party	Candidate	Votes	%
Democratic	Daniel Rovaro (Incumbent)	4,648	100.00
Total votes		4,648	100.00
Democratic hold			

=== 2012 ===
2012 Connecticut House of Representatives election, District 51
Party	Candidate	Votes	%
Democratic	Daniel Rovaro (Incumbent)	6,649	100.00
Total votes		6,649	100.00
Democratic hold			
