= Chris Stewart (Connecticut politician) =

American politician

Member of the Connecticut House of Representatives from the 51st district
- Incumbent
- Assumed office January 8, 2025
- Preceded by: Rick Hayes

Personal details
- Party: Republican

Chris Stewart is an American politician and member of the Connecticut House of Representatives since 2024 from the 51st district, which contains the towns of Putnam, Thompson, and parts of Killingly.
