= Jim O'Neil (ice hockey) =

Canadian ice hockey player

Jim O'Neill
- O'Neil with the Boston Bruins, c. 1933–1937
- Born: April 3, 1913; Semans, Saskatchewan, Canada
- Died: October 17, 1997 (aged 84)
- Height: 5 ft 8 in (173 cm)
- Weight: 160 lb (73 kg; 11 st 6 lb)
- Position: Centre
- Shot: Right
- Played for: Montreal Canadiens; Boston Bruins
- Playing career: 1931–1946

James Beaton "Peggy" O'Neil (April 3, 1913 – October 17, 1997) was a Canadian ice hockey player. He played 165 National Hockey League games between 1933 and 1942, including nine in the playoffs.

== Early life ==
O'Neil was born in Semans, Saskatchewan.

== Career ==
He played for the Boston Bruins and the Montreal Canadiens. The rest of his career, which lasted from 1931 to 1946, was mainly spent in the American Hockey League.

O'Neil scored six NHL goals, all for Boston. The first one occurred at Boston Garden on January 9, 1934. It was the only Boston goal in the team's 2-1 home loss to the New York Americans.

He played 447 regular season AHL games and another 43 in the post-season. His best offensive season in the AHL was 1942–1943, when he scored 19 goals and had 50 assists for 69 points in 55 games for 1.25 points per game. The next season, he scored 20 goals for the only time in his career. After he retired from playing in 1946, he coached the Fenn College Foxes hockey team.

== Personal life ==
O'Neil and his wife, Betty, had three children. They settled in the Highlands neighborhood in Edmonton, Alberta, Canada.

== Career statistics ==
=== Regular season and playoffs ===
			Regular season					Playoffs
Season	Team	League	GP	G	A	Pts	PIM	GP	G	A	Pts	PIM
1930–31	Saskatoon Westleys	N-SJHL	4	6	2	8	2	2	0	0	0	2
1931–32	Saskatoon Crescents	N-SSHL	18	6	3	9	22	4	0	1	1	12
1931–32	Saskatoon Westleys	N-SJHL	4	3	0	3	5	8	3	0	3	10
1931–32	Saskatoon Westleys	M-Cup	—	—	—	—	—	2	0	0	0	2
1932–33	Boston Cubs	Can-Am	46	13	17	30	63	7	1	3	4	8
1933–34	Boston Bruins	NHL	23	2	2	4	15	—	—	—	—	—
1933–34	Boston Cubs	Can-Am	12	6	5	11	19	—	—	—	—	—
1934–35	Boston Bruins	NHL	48	2	11	13	35	4	0	0	0	9
1935–36	Boston Bruins	NHL	48	2	11	13	49	2	1	1	2	4
1936–37	Boston Bruins	NHL	21	0	2	2	6	—	—	—	—	—
1936–37	Providence Reds	IAHL	15	2	8	10	14	3	0	1	1	2
1937–38	Cleveland Barons	IAHL	38	5	24	29	66	2	0	0	0	0
1938–39	Cleveland Barons	IAHL	41	4	18	22	29	9	2	6	8	0
1939–40	Cleveland Barons	IAHL	56	7	20	27	35	—	—	—	—	—
1940–41	Montreal Canadiens	NHL	12	0	3	3	0	3	0	0	0	0
1940–41	New Haven Eagles	AHL	40	7	17	24	40	—	—	—	—	—
1941–42	Montreal Canadiens	NHL	4	0	1	1	4	—	—	—	—	—
1941–42	Washington Lions	AHL	41	7	33	40	22	2	0	0	0	6
1942–43	Washington Lions	AHL	10	2	7	9	4	—	—	—	—	—
1942–43	Hershey Bears	AHL	45	17	43	60	48	6	3	1	4	2
1943–44	Hershey Bears	AHL	54	20	33	53	18	7	0	6	6	2
1944–45	Hershey Bears	AHL	55	14	32	46	16	11	2	7	9	4
1945–46	Hershey Bears	AHL	52	5	26	31	33	3	0	0	0	2
IAHL/AHL totals			447	90	261	351	325	43	7	21	28	18
NHL totals			156	6	30	36	109	9	1	1	2	13
