= Pamela Sawyer =

American politician (born 1952)

Member of the Connecticut House of Representatives from the 55th district
- In office 1993–2015
- Preceded by: J. Peter Fusscas
- Succeeded by: Gayle Mulligan

Personal details
- Born: August 14, 1952 (age 73) Providence, Rhode Island, U.S.
- Party: Republican
- Education: University of Rhode Island

Pamela Sawyer (born August 14, 1952) is an American politician who served as a member of the Connecticut House of Representatives from 1993 to 2015, representing the 55th district as a Republican.

== Biography ==
Sawyer was born on August 14, 1952, in Providence, Rhode Island. She graduated from the University of Rhode Island.

== Career ==
Sawyer was first elected to the House of Representatives in 1992. She is a Republican.
