= Ellen Paul =

American politician

Member-elect of the Connecticut House of Representatives from the 55th district
- Assuming office January 2027
- Succeeding: Steve Weir

Personal details
- Party: Democratic
- Website: Campaign website

Ellen Paul is an American politician. A member of the Democratic Party, she is the member-elect for the 55th district of the Connecticut House of Representatives. She was elected at the 2026 election. She is Executive Director of the Connecticut Library Consortium (CLC).
