= Robin Green (politician) =

American politician

Member of the Connecticut House of Representatives from the 55th district
- In office 2017–2023
- Preceded by: Gayle Mulligan
- Succeeded by: Steve Weir

Personal details
- Party: Republican

Robin Green is an American politician who served as a member of the Connecticut House of Representatives from the 55th district, which includes the towns of Andover, Bolton, Hebron, and Marlborough, from 2017 to 2023. Green was first elected to the office in 2016, when she ran unopposed. Green was re-elected in 2018, when she beat Democrat Tiffany Thiele, and again in 2020, when she beat Democrat John Collins. In January 2022, Green announced that she did not intend to seek re-election in the 2022 Connecticut House of Representatives election.
