= Daniel Rovero =

American politician (1937–2025)

Daniel S. Rovero (December 5, 1937 – March 5, 2025) was an American Democratic Party politician who, from 2011 to 2019, served as a member of the Connecticut House of Representatives from the 51st district (comprising the towns of Putnam, Thompson, and parts of Killingly). He was born in Putnam, where he served as mayor from 1991 to 2005. Rovero, considered a fiscal conservative, often sided against his own party on budget issues. He announced his retirement in January 2018. He formerly served as mayor of Putnam, from 1991 to 2005. Rovero died in Putnam on March 5, 2025, at the age of 87.

Connecticut House of Representatives
Preceded by Shawn T. Johnston	Member of the Connecticut House of Representatives from the 51st district 2011–2019	Succeeded by Rick Hayes
