= Rick Hayes (politician) =

American politician

Member of the Connecticut House of Representatives from the 51st district
- In office January 9, 2019 – January 8, 2025
- Preceded by: Daniel Rovero
- Succeeded by: Chris Stewart

Member of the Putnam Board of Selectmen
- Incumbent
- Assumed office 2017

Personal details
- Born: Ricky L. Hayes; January 17, 1959 (age 67) Putnam, Connecticut, U.S.
- Party: Republican
- Education: Quinsigamond Community College

Rick Hayes (born January 17, 1959) is an American politician who served from 2019 to 2025 as a Connecticut State Representative from the 51st District, which encompasses the towns of Putnam, Thompson, and parts of Killingly. A member of the Republican Party, Hayes first ran for the seat in 2018 in an election where he would win over Democratic candidate Larry Groh Jr. Hayes was re-elected in 2020, once again defeating Groh. Hayes was reelected once more in 2022, but chose to retire in 2024. He was succeeded by his son-in-law, Chris Stewart. He is currently a member of the Putnam Board of Selectman, serving in that position since 2017.
