= Gayle Mulligan =

American politician

Member of the Connecticut House of Representatives from the 55th district
- In office 2015–2017
- Preceded by: Pamela Sawyer
- Succeeded by: Robin Green

Personal details
- Party: Republican

Gayle Mulligan is an American politician who served in the Connecticut House of Representatives from 2015 to 2017, representing the 55th district as a Republican.
