= Wolstein Center =

Indoor arena in Cleveland, Ohio, United States

The Wolstein Center (Goodman Arena)

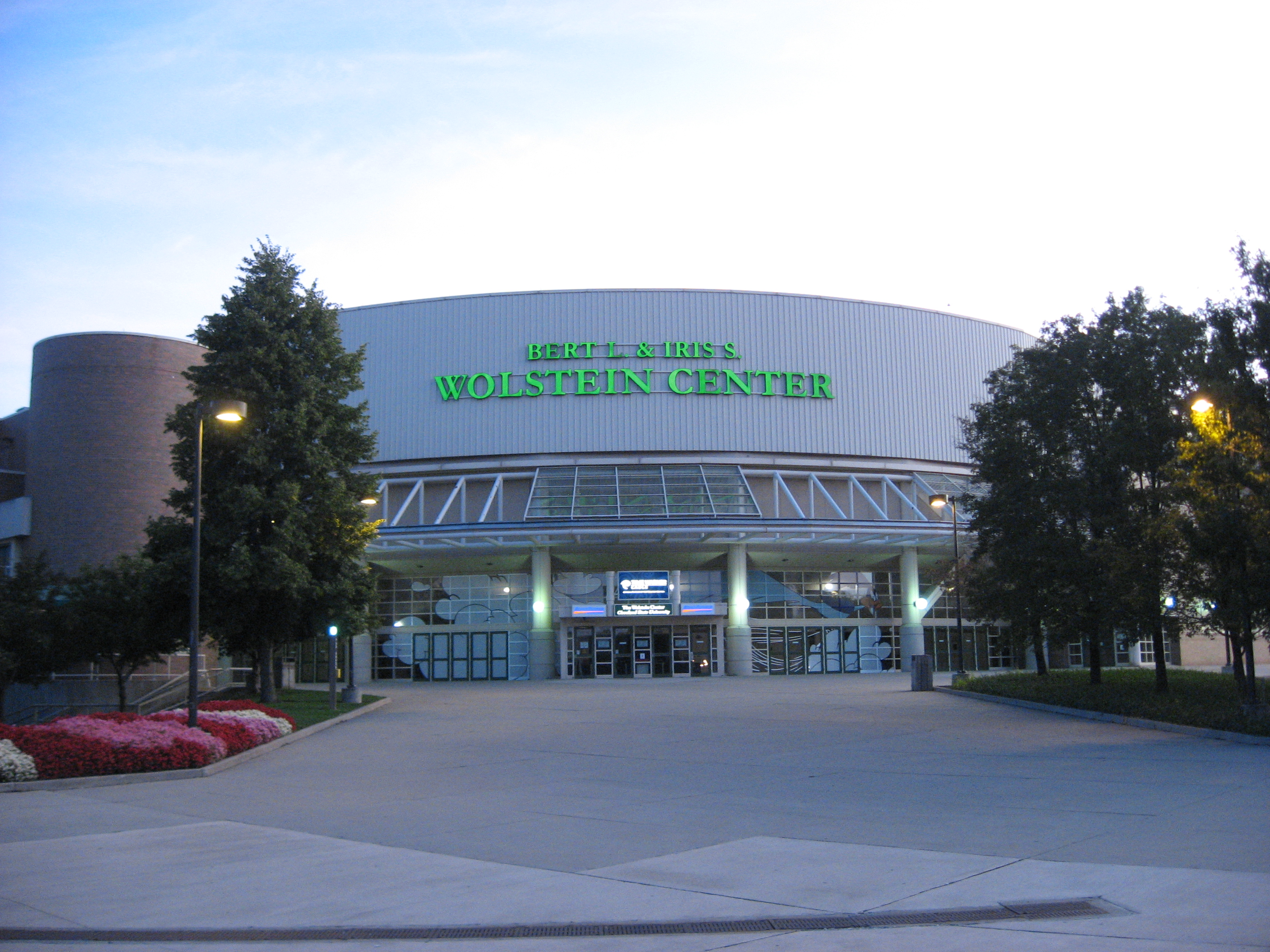

- Location within Ohio Location within the United States
- Interactive map of The Wolstein Center (Goodman Arena)
- Former names: CSU Convocation Center (1991–2005)
- Address: 2000 Prospect Avenue
- Location: Cleveland, Ohio, U.S.
- Coordinates: 41°29′57″N 81°40′37″W
- Owner: Cleveland State University
- Operator: Cleveland State University
- Capacity: 15,000 with floor seats 13,610 permanent seats 8,500 for CSU games
- Surface: Multi-surface

Construction
- Groundbreaking: August 1989
- Opened: November 1, 1991
- Cost: US$55 million ($162 million in 2025 dollars)
- Architects: URS-Dalton Consultants; Whitley/Whitley Architects

Tenants
- Cleveland State Vikings (NCAA) 1991–present Cleveland Charge (NBAGL) 2021–2024; Cleveland Crunch (NPSL/MISL) 1992–2005; (MLIS) 2025–present

Website
- wolsteincenter.com

The Bert L. and Iris S. Wolstein Center is a 13,610-seat indoor arena located in downtown Cleveland, Ohio, United States, on the campus of Cleveland State University (CSU). It is home to the Cleveland State Vikings men's and women's basketball teams and Cleveland Crunch of Major League Indoor Soccer (MLIS). The center previously was home of the Cleveland Charge of the NBA G League from 2021 to 2024.

The building opened in 1991 as a replacement for Woodling Gym and was known until 2005 as the CSU Convocation Center. It is named for Bert Wolstein, a Cleveland area real estate developer, former owner of the Force, and CSU alumnus, and his wife Iris. The main arena is known as Henry J. Goodman Arena, named for a businessman and former chairman of the CSU Board of Trustees.

In its full configuration, it seats 13,610 for basketball, and with additional floor seating can hold 15,000 for concerts and professional wrestling. In addition to the arena, the Wolstein Center also has a practice gym and grand ballroom. It is the largest basketball arena in the Horizon League and the second-largest college basketball arena in Ohio by total seating capacity.

In recent years, Cleveland State has downsized capacity for basketball to 8,500 for most Vikings games. The basketball floor is placed closer to the eastern baseline, and the western third of the arena is curtained off. For many games only lower-level seating is available and upper-level seating sections are covered with tarps, further reducing available seating. The area behind the curtain is used for a variety of other purposes, including a "Kids Fun Zone" children's play area during games. The curtain itself was adorned with a large American flag for several years and since 2023 features a video board and auxiliary scoreboards facing the court.

The Wolstein Center has also hosted numerous concerts, featuring artists such as David Bowie, Elton John, Martina McBride, TLC, Pearl Jam, Carrie Underwood, Justin Bieber, Janet Jackson, 311, The Beastie Boys, The Cure, The Blue Man Group, Twenty One Pilots, and Motley Crue. The arena was site of the 1998 NCAA Division I Wrestling Championships and served as host for first and second-round games of the 2000 and 2005 NCAA Division I men's basketball tournaments as well as the 2019 NCAA Fencing Championships.

Effective on January 1, 2027, the arena will transition from a public venue to a facility exclusively dedicated to Cleveland State Athletics. An eventual demolition is also planned at some point in the future. Afterwards, it will be replaced with a "Partnership District."

== History ==
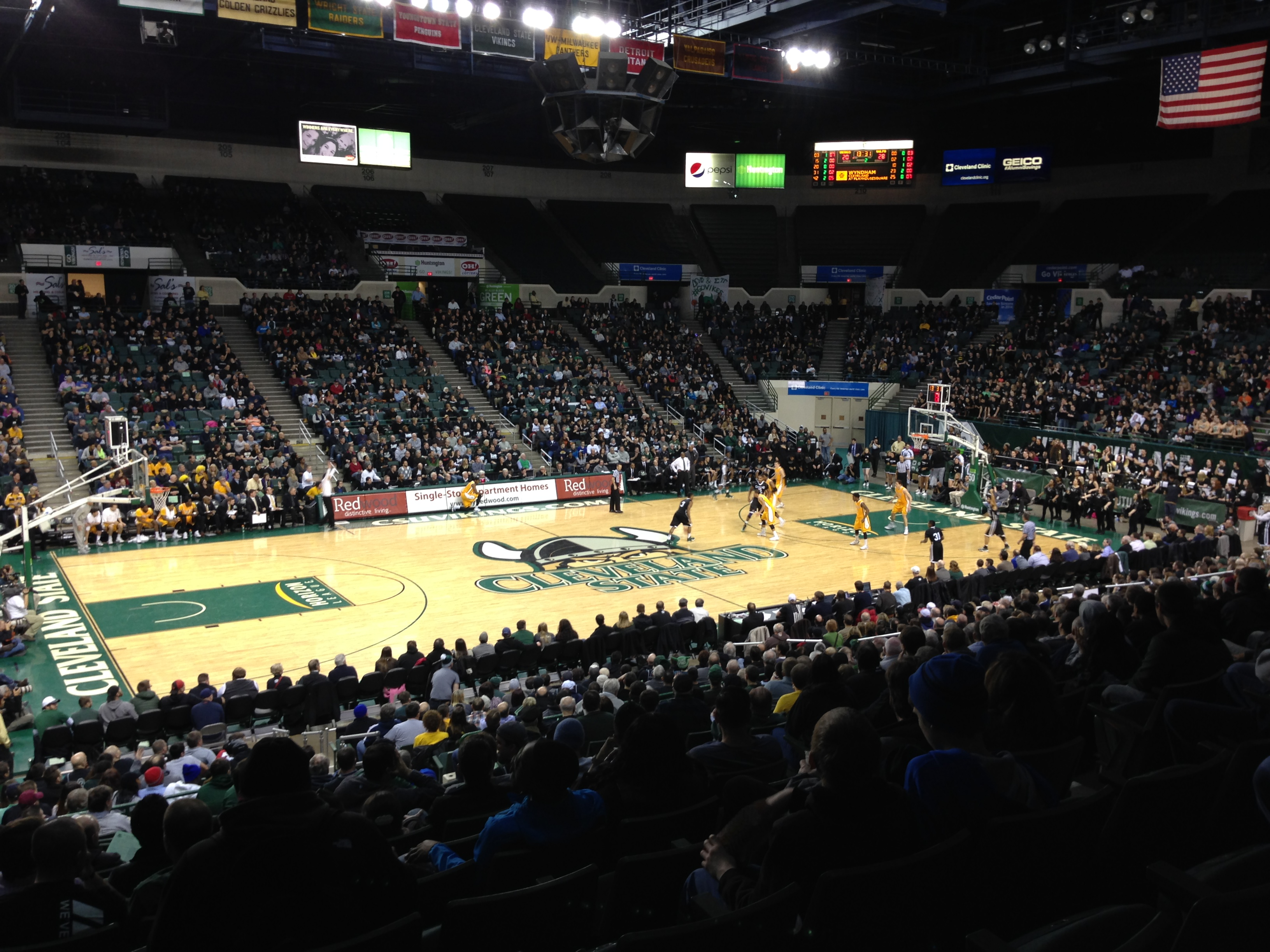
Interior view of the arena during a CSU men's basketball game in 2015

Construction on the Wolstein Center began in August 1989 in the aftermath of the team's run to the Sweet Sixteen in the 1986 NCAA Division I men's basketball tournament. Prior to its opening, the team played at Woodling Gym on campus or (for higher profile games) at the 10,000-seat Public Auditorium. The arena was completed on November 1, 1991, at a cost of $55 million. The 13,610 seats made the Wolstein Center the largest arena in downtown Cleveland until the opening of Gund Arena in 1994, and it was the largest university-owned arena in Ohio until 1998 when Value City Arena opened at Ohio State University.

The main arena is named Goodman Arena after Henry J. Goodman, former chairman of the Cleveland State board of trustees, while the building is named after Bert and Iris Wolstein, who donated $6.5 million towards the building's construction, the largest philanthropic gift in CSU history. The building also contains a practice gym, a 23,744 square feet (2,205.9 m^{2}) grand ballroom, six-room conference center, and eight concession stands. In the arena, there is a 100-seat party loge located above the seating in the west baseline.

=== Cleveland Crunch ===
The Wolstein Center was previously home of the Cleveland Crunch which played in the National Professional Soccer League and Major Indoor Soccer League from 1992 to 2005. In 2025, the revived Crunch franchise - which now plays in Major League Indoor Soccer (MLIS) - announced their home games would be played at the Wolstein Center.

=== Cleveland Charge ===
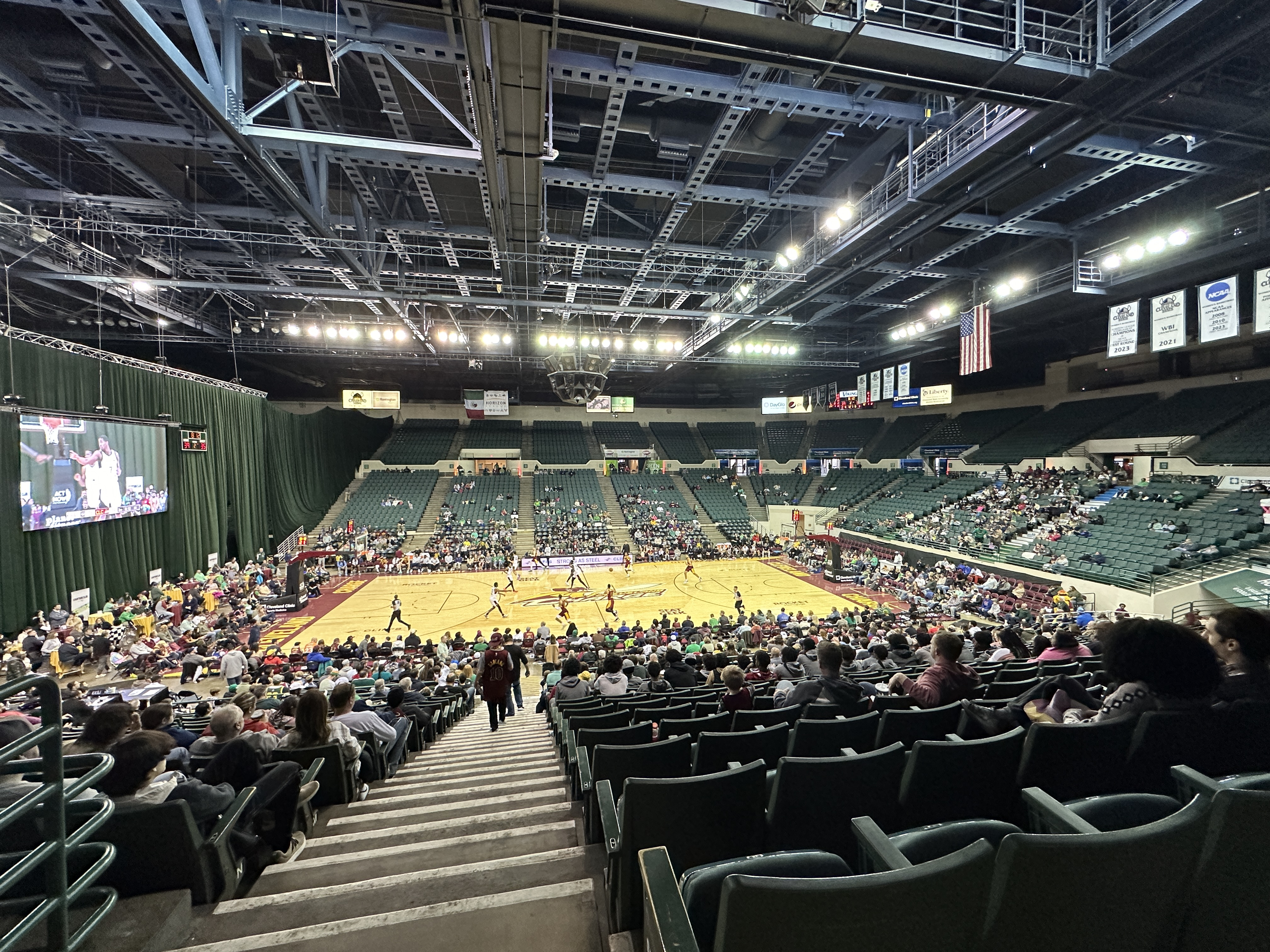
Charge game in 2024

From 2021 to 2024, the arena was home to the Cleveland Charge, the NBA G League affiliate of the Cleveland Cavaliers. The team, previously located in Canton, Ohio, as the Canton Charge, announced the move to Cleveland on June 9, 2021, and began play at the Wolstein Center in the 2021–22 season.

The team announced a six-year agreement with the city of Cleveland in June 2024 to move home games to Public Auditorium in downtown Cleveland beginning with the 2024–25 season.

While a rumored "impending demolition" of the Wolstein Center as part of Cleveland State University's 2022 master plan was mentioned as a reason for the move to Public Auditorium, Cleveland State University stated that there are no immediate plans regarding the arena's future.

== Other events ==
=== Basketball ===
Both the 1992 Mid-Continent Conference men's basketball tournament and the 2002 Horizon League men's basketball tournament were held at the Wolstein Center, then called the CSU Convocation Center, as well as being the site for first and second-round games of the NCAA Division I men's basketball tournament, in 2000 and 2005.

In the 2005 tournament, the 12th-seeded Milwaukee Panthers and 7th-seeded West Virginia Mountaineers won both of their respective games played at the Wolstein Center to advance to the Sweet Sixteen.

Cleveland hosted the 2022 NBA All-Star Game at Rocket Mortgage FieldHouse. As part of the All-Star Weekend events, the All-Star Celebrity Game was held at the Wolstein Center on February 18, 2022.

=== Professional wrestling ===
The Wolstein Center also hosted multiple professional wrestling events from numerous promotions:

WWE hosted their flagship shows Monday Night Raw on January 26, 2009, and Friday Night SmackDown on December 28, 2010.

Total Nonstop Action Wrestling (TNA) hosted their weekly flagship show Impact for two weeks worth of tapings on August 29, 2013, and their Rebellion pay-per-view on April 11, 2026

All Elite Wrestling (AEW) did a live broadcast of their flagship program AEW Dynamite at the arena on January 29, 2020, in its Cleveland debut, and returned for their Beach Break event – which encompassed Dynamite and its companion show Rampage – on January 26, 2022. Another Dynamite/Rampage broadcast and taping took place on August 24, 2022. A Halloween themed edition of Dynamite titled Fright Night Dynamite took place on October 30, 2024.

World Championship Wrestling (WCW) also held numerous events (including episodes of their flagship show WCW Monday Nitro) at the center until WCW's folding in 2001.

=== Other sports ===
The 1998 NCAA Division I Wrestling Championships were held in the arena, won by the Iowa Hawkeyes.

The Professional Bull Riders Bud Light Cup tour hosted a bull riding event at the Wolstein Center, then known as the CSU Convocation Center, in 2000 and 2001.

The arena hosted the Kellogg's Tour of Gymnastics Champions in 2016 and the Hot Wheels Monster Trucks Live in 2019 and 2020.

Real American Freestyle held its inaugural event, RAF 01, at the venue on August 30, 2025.

=== Concerts ===
On February 26, 2015, Barry Manilow performed at the Wolstein Center during his "One Last Time! Tour."

AJR headlined the arena on May 11, 2022, for their tour in support of their album "OK Orchestra".

=== Miscellaneous ===
NBC News held a Democratic Party presidential debate between Hillary Clinton and Barack Obama on February 26, 2008, at the Wolstein Center. The debate was broadcast live on MSNBC, and was moderated by Brian Williams with Tim Russert.

=== COVID-19 vaccination center ===
On March 5, 2021, Ohio Governor Mike DeWine announced the Wolstein Center would host Ohio's first mass COVID-19 vaccination center, which ran from March 17 - June 7, 2021.

== Management ==
Since 2015, the Wolstein Center has been managed in partnership with Rocket Arena. The Rocket Arena staff works as a consultant to assist in promoting and booking events at both venues, while in return, select Vikings men's basketball games are played at Rocket Arena each season.

== See also ==
- Krenzler Field
- List of indoor arenas in the United States
- List of NCAA Division I basketball arenas
