= Penn-Ohio Conference =

The Penn-Ohio Conference was a college swimming conference from at least 1941 to 1998.

== Members ==
- Ashland University
- California University of Pennsylvania
- Carnegie-Mellon University
- Cleveland State University
- Edinboro University
- Fairmont State University
- Gannon University
- Grove City College
- Indiana University of Pennsylvania
- Mercyhurst University
- Slippery Rock University
- Transylvania University
- University of Akron
- University of Findlay
- Valparaiso University
- Westminster College
- Wright State University
- Youngstown State University
- West Virginia Wesleyan College
- Wheeling Jesuit University

== Champions ==
=== Men's Champions ===
- 1941-42 - Westminster
- 1942-43 -
- 1943-44 -
- 1944-45 -
- 1945-46 -
- 1946-47 -
- 1947-48 - Westminster
- 1948-49 -
- 1949-50 -
- 1950-51 -
- 1951-52 -
- 1952-53 -
- 1953-54 - Grove City
- 1954-55 -
- 1955-56 -
- 1956-57 - Slippery Rock
- 1957-58 -
- 1958-59 -
- 1959-60 -
- 1960-61 -
- 1961-62 - Grove City
- 1962-63 - Grove City
- 1963-64 - Grove City
- 1964-65 - Grove City
- 1965-66 - Grove City
- 1966-67 - Grove City
- 1967-68 - Grove City
- 1968-69 -
- 1969-70 -
- 1970-71 -
- 1971-72 -
- 1972-73 -
- 1973-74 - Cleveland State
- 1974-75 - Indiana University of Pennsylvania
- 1975-76 - Cleveland State
- 1976-77 - Cleveland State
- 1977-78 - Cleveland State
- 1978-79 - Cleveland State
- 1979-80 - Cleveland State
- 1980-81 - Cleveland State
- 1981-82 - Cleveland State
- 1982-83 - Cleveland State
- 1983-84 - Cleveland State
- 1984-85 - Cleveland State
- 1985-86 - Cleveland State
- 1986-87 -
- 1987-88 -
- 1988-89 -
- 1989-90 - Cleveland State
- 1990-91 - Cleveland State
- 1991-92 - Cleveland State
- 1992-93 - Westminster
- 1993-94 - Westminster
- 1994-95
- 1995-96 -
- 1996-97 -
- 1997-98 -

=== Women's Champions ===
- 1980-81 -
- 1981-82 -
- 1982-83 -
- 1983-84 -
- 1984-85 -
- 1985-86 -
- 1986-87 -
- 1987-88 -
- 1988-89 -
- 1989-90 - Cleveland State
- 1990-91 - Cleveland State
- 1991-92 - Westminster
- 1992-93 -
- 1993-94 -
- 1995-96 -
- 1996-97 -
- 1997-98 -
