= Cleveland State Vikings women's volleyball =

American college volleyball team

- University: Cleveland State University
- Head coach: Chuck Voss (17th season)
- Conference: Horizon
- Location: Cleveland, Ohio, US
- Home arena: Woodling Gym (capacity: 3,000)
- Nickname: Vikings
- Colors: Forest green and white

AIAW/NCAA tournament appearance
- 2007, 2012, 2015, 2016

Conference tournament champion
- 2007, 2012, 2015, 2016, 2017

Conference regular season champion
- 2009, 2012, 2015, 2016, 2017

The Cleveland State Vikings women's volleyball team represents Cleveland State University in the Horizon League. They are currently led by head coach Chuck Voss and play their home games at Woodling Gym.

== Record by year ==
On September 14, 2025, Cleveland State Vikings women's volleyball earned a win over the Duke Blue Devils for the first time in program history.

Record table
Season	Coach	Overall	Conference	Standing	Postseason
Cleveland State (Independent) (1972–1987)
1972	Marsha Foth Nagy	11–2			
1973	Marsha Foth Nagy	12–3			
1974	Marsha Foth Nagy	25–6			
1975	Marsha Foth Nagy	22–9			
1976	Marsha Foth Nagy	18–9			
1977	Marsha Foth Nagy	28–11			
1978	Mary Motley	37–11			
1979	Mary Motley	16–31–5			
1980	Mary Motley	28–24			
1981	Mary Motley	20–27			
1982	Mary Motley	38–11			
1983	Mary Motley	29–13			
1984	Mary Motley	17–21			
1985	Mary Motley	11–16			
1986	Mary Motley	16–24			
1987	Mary Motley	11–36			
Cleveland State (North Star Conference) (1988–1991)
1988	Mary Motley	20–22	3–7		
1989	Mary Motley	12–24	0–6		
1990	Mary Motley	6–32	0–7		
1991	Mary Motley	12–24	0–6		
Cleveland State (Mid-Continent Conference) (1992–1993)
1992	Mary Motley	15–17	5–11	7th	
1993	Mary Motley	5–26	2–16	T–9th	
Cleveland State (Horizon League) (1994–present)
1994	Debbie Borsz	11–20	2–8	T–9th	
1995	Debbie Borsz	6–26	3–11	7th	
1996	Debbie Borsz	15–19	4–10	7th	
1997	Debbie Borsz	14–17	3–9	5th	
1998	Debbie Borsz	15–17	5–7	T–4th	
1999	Debbie Borsz	8–22	3–9	6th	
2000	Chuck Voss	12–17	1–11	7th	
2001	Chuck Voss	7–19	2–12	7th	
2002	Chuck Voss	18–12	5–9	7th	
2003	Chuck Voss	18–16	4–10	6th	
2004	Chuck Voss	15–13	6–8	T–4th	
2005	Chuck Voss	19–10	11–3	2nd	
2006	Chuck Voss	19–9	8–6	T–2nd	
2007	Chuck Voss	23–9	13–3	2nd	NCAA, First Round
2008	Chuck Voss	11–19	7–9	6th	
2009	Chuck Voss	26–8	13–3	1st	
2010	Chuck Voss	22–7	11–5	3rd	
2011	Chuck Voss	21–8	13–3	2nd	
2012	Chuck Voss	23–7	13–1	1st	NCAA, First Round
2013	Chuck Voss	16–13	5–9	6th	
2014	Chuck Voss	14–14	7–7	6th	
2015	Chuck Voss	26–7	13–3	1st	NCAA, First Round
2016	Chuck Voss	25–6	14–2	1st	NCAA, First Round
2017	Chuck Voss				
2018	Chuck Voss				
2019	Chuck Voss				
2020	Chuck Voss				
2021	Chuck Voss				
2022	Chuck Voss				
2023	Chuck Voss				
2024	Chuck Voss				
2025	Chuck Voss				
2026	Chuck Voss				
Total:		793–715–5	176–211		
National champion Postseason invitational champion Conference regular season champion Conference regular season and conference tournament champion Division regular season champion Division regular season and conference tournament champion Conference tournament champion

School	Season	Record	(Conf. Record)	Postseason
Total	45 years	793–715–5	(176–211)	4 Postseason bids

- Totals updated through the end of the 2016–2017 school year.

== NCAA Tournament history ==
Season	Eliminated Round	Teams Defeated	Lost to
2007	First round	–	Albany
2012	First round	–	Kansas
2015	First round	–	USC
2016	First round	–	Arizona

== Head coaching history ==
#	Name	Years	Record
1	Marsha Foth Nagy	1972–1977	116–40
2	Mary Motley	1978–1993	293–359–5
3	Debbie Borsz	1994–1999	69–121
4	Chuck Voss	2000—	315–194

== See also ==
- List of NCAA Division I women's volleyball programs
