= Homer E. Woodling =

American athletics coach

Biographical details
- Born: February 23, 1902; Logansport, Indiana, U.S.
- Died: September 14, 1984 (aged 82); Westlake, Ohio, U.S.

Coaching career (HC unless noted)
- 1929–1941: Fenn College
- 1952–1953: Fenn College

Homer Eugene "Woody" 'Woodling (February 23, 1902 – September 14, 1984) was an American athletics coach and administrator at Fenn College—now Cleveland State University. Woodling served two stints as the head men's basketball coach at Fenn College, from 1929 to 1941 and again from 1952 to 1953. He also coached the Cleveland State baseball, track, tennis and golf teams. Woodling served as Cleveland State's athletic director until 1966. He was the only athletic director that Fenn College had. He served in that position from 1929 to 1965 when Fenn College became Cleveland State. He was inducted into the Cleveland State Hall of Fame in 1975.

Woodling Gym on the Cleveland State campus is named after him. It is home to volleyball, wrestling, and fencing.

== Personal life ==
Woodling was born to Charles Elwood Woodling and Elizabeth Beatrice Woodling (née Cotner). He married Frances R. Pinnell.

== Head coaching record ==
=== Men's basketball ===
Record table
Season	Team	Overall	Conference	Standing	Postseason
Fenn College (1929–1941)
1929–1930	Fenn College	5–5	N/A		
1930–1931	Fenn College	8–7	N/A		
1931–1932	Fenn College	7–7	N/A		
1932–1933	Fenn College	4–6	N/A		
1933–1934	Fenn College	5–11	N/A		
1934–1935	Fenn College	5–12	N/A		
1935–1936	Fenn College	4–11	N/A		
1936–1937	Fenn College	8–9	N/A		
1937–1938	Fenn College	6–10	N/A		
1938–1939	Fenn College	3–13	N/A		
1939–1940	Fenn College	4–11	N/A		
1940–1941	Fenn College	4–11	N/A		
Fenn College (1952–1953)
1952–1953	Fenn College	2–15	N/A		
Fenn College:		65–127			
Total:					
National champion Postseason invitational champion Conference regular season champion Conference regular season and conference tournament champion Division regular season champion Division regular season and conference tournament champion Conference tournament champion
