= Teresa Baker =

American activist

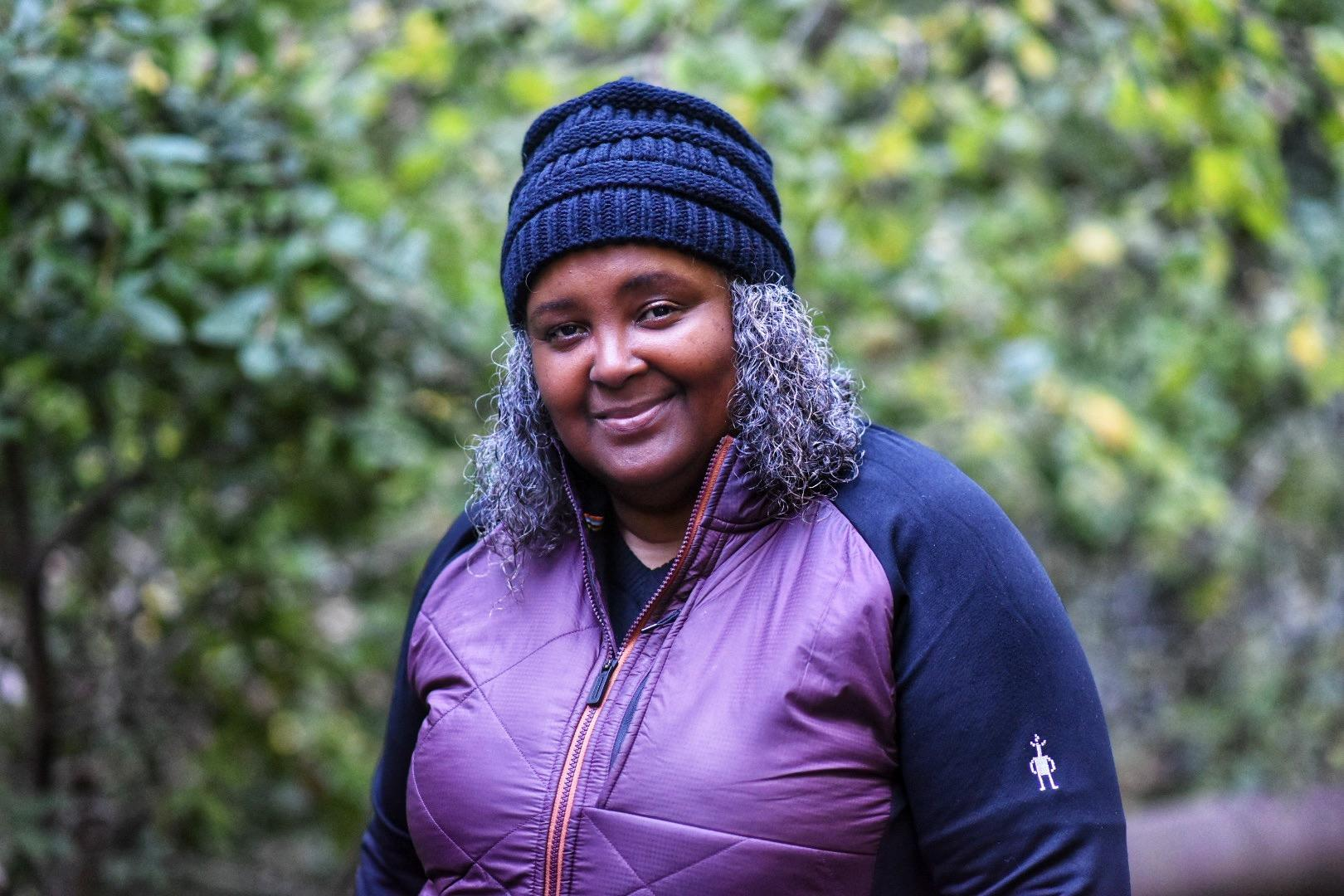

Teresa Baker is an outdoor diversity activist, writer, and founder of several organizations which most recently includes the In Solidarity Project, an organization designed to increase diversity and inclusion in outdoor spaces by working with outdoor industry companies and CEOs. She is the founder of several other initiatives designed to increase diversity and inclusion in outdoor spaces, including African American Nature and Parks Experience, which hosts the annual African American National Park Event and the annual Hike Like a Girl event.

== Early life ==
Baker grew up in Richmond, California, where she spent a lot of her time outside playing with her siblings. Throughout the years she began to understand the impact being in outdoor spaces had in her life. It brought her a clear sense of obligation to the land. While Baker had learned to love the outdoors as a child growing up in California, "My affinity for outdoor spaces and animals came naturally."

== Career ==
As Baker continued to spend time outdoors, including solo hiking and backpacking in national parks, she started to notice that most of the people she encountered on the trails did not look like her. The lack of diversity on hiking trails and national parks across the USA served as her motivation to make the outdoors a place that was welcoming to everyone. In 2013 she ran her first campaign African American National Parks Event, part of African American Nature and Parks Experience, to encourage people of color to explore national parks, which has now turned into an annual event. Through this initiative, Baker worked closely with the National Park Service in organizing an event in June 2014 to highlight the Buffalo Soldiers in the National Park system, who were some of the first national park rangers.

After Baker's first National Parks event in 2014, which had about 500 attendees, the events have grown exponentially. After that success, Baker started Hike Like A Girl, a female-focused campaign that "encourages families and friends to hit the trails on a chosen weekend in May and document their adventures on social media." Through these initiatives, Baker seeks to make outdoor spaces more representative, inclusive, and equitable, encouraging everyone to get outdoors and experience the natural world. Eventually, Baker hopes this will "cultivate new stewards of the great outdoors."

In July 2018, she founded the Outdoor CEO Diversity Pledge, which aims to connect outdoor brands to diversity and inclusion advocates and experts and asks executives to commit to these efforts. The CEO Pledge has been highly successful, with over 185 brands, non-profits, and college/school groups currently signed on. This effort turned into the In Solidarity project in 2020, which aims to connect outdoor DEI leaders with industry partners and non-profit organizations by providing consulting and speaking opportunities in addition to the Outdoor CEO Diversity Pledge. The In Solidarity project has also had grant programs aimed at supporting underrepresented, underserved and marginalized communities in the outdoors. In March 2021, Baker organized the Women's Outdoor Summit for women in the outdoor industry to network and learn from each other. The event was supported by several outdoor companies and featured panels, workshops, and speakers, including women CEOs in the outdoor industry and Deb Haaland, current Secretary of the Interior. In August 2026, she hosted the Women's Nature and Joy Summit, in Stinson Beach, CA, attended by 60 women, including several outdoor brand CEOs.

In addition to her many initiatives, Baker frequently writes for outdoor magazines and organizations, including with the Audubon Society and Outside magazine.

=== Honors and awards ===
In 2018, Baker and the American Hiking Society won the Together We Are a Force Award from the Outdoor Industry Association for their work in organizing a Hike Like a Girl weekend event with support from Vasque and Patagonia. In addition, she was recognized as "Woman of the Month" in August 2018 by Sol Sisters for her work with initiatives such as the African American National Parks event and Hike Like a Girl.

=== Media and interviews ===
Baker actively conducts media interviews and podcasts to continually promote outdoor spaces as a place for all, including for the Huffington Post in 2014. Baker also has contributed to several podcasts and can be heard speaking on YouTube as part of Pulse Check on DEI in Rock Climbing & the Outdoor Industry from April 2021, talking with Outside Business Journal in February 2021, and describing her DEI work in the outdoors with Alta Ski Area in September 2020
