= Steve Weir =

American politician

Member of the Connecticut House of Representatives from the 55th district
- Incumbent
- Assumed office 2023
- Preceded by: Robin Green
- Succeeded by: Ellen Paul (elect)

Personal details
- Born: 1974 (age 51–52)
- Party: Republican
- Education: University of Connecticut (BA)

Steve Weir (born 1974) is a Republican member of the Connecticut House of Representatives serving in the 55th district. He is a restoration contractor and small business owner.
