= Robert F. Busbey =

Personal information
- Born: April 18, 1928 Cleveland, Ohio, United States
- Died: March 9, 2000 (aged 71)

Sport
- Sport: Swimming

Robert F. Busbey (April 18, 1928 – March 9, 2000) was an athletic director, vice president, and head swimming coach at Cleveland State University. He served as athletic director from 1966 until 1990, head swimming coach for 30 years, and also coached track and golf. He was unanimously elected as a charter member of the Cleveland State hall of fame in 1975. During his coaching tenure he was named an assistant coach to the 1964 USA Olympic swim team, served as chairman of the NCAA Swimming Committee and was responsible for Cleveland State hosting four Division I and one Division II NCAA Men's Swimming and Diving Championships. He was editor of the NCAA rules book over 12 years and received the 1982 National Collegiate & Scholastic Swimming Trophy, one of the sports highest awards.

On October 2, 1999, Cleveland State's CSU Natatorium was renamed the Robert F. Busbey Natatorium in his honor for his years of service as athlete and coach. He enrolled at Fenn College (now Cleveland State University) in 1946. As a four-sport athlete (swimming, baseball, track, and fencing), he was Fenn College's first All-American. He achieved this honor in both 1948 and 1949. He was also Cleveland State's head swimming coach from 1951 to 1981.

Sporting positions
Preceded by Jody Gram	Cleveland State head swimming coach 1951–1981	Succeeded by Wally Morton
