= Valparaiso University deaccessioning controversy =

Valparaiso University art dispute

In early 2023, Valparaiso University in Valparaiso, Indiana, U.S., under the leadership of President José Padilla, announced that it had decided to sell three paintings in its collection to fund dormitory renovations. The proposed sale of three paintings—Mountain Landscape (c. 1849) by Frederic Edwin Church, The Silver Veil and the Golden Gate (1914) by Childe Hassam, and Rust Red Hills (1930) by Georgia O'Keeffe—sparked fierce opposition, including protests from faculty and students, and from Richard H. W. Brauer, retired founding director of the university's Brauer Museum of Art where the paintings were exhibited.

== Background ==
In early 2023, university president Padilla argued that the university's declining enrollment necessitated the sale of three paintings from the permanent Brauer Museum of Art collection. Padilla also threatened to cut additional programs and positions. The university board and administration declared that the paintings represent assets that "are not core or critical to the educational mission or strategic plan" to increase enrollment and grow the university. To cut costs, the university shut down its law school in 2020 and no longer offers degrees in secondary education and French. By selling the paintings, Valparaiso will raise more than the projected $8–10 million needed to build new student housing, with the O'Keeffe painting alone worth $10–15 million.

== Museum association opposition ==
The proposed sale was opposed by the Association of Art Museum Directors (AAMD), the American Alliance of Museums (AAM), the Association of Academic Museums and Galleries (AAMG), and the Association of Art Museum Curators (AAMC). The ethical guidelines and best practices of deaccessioning require that proceeds from any art sales must be used solely for art, not for infrastructure projects like Valparaiso intended to be completed. According to the AAMD, when a museum generally sells work to raise money, the proceeds are usually conserved for other artworks, either to obtain new works or to preserve the old ones. The Brauer Museum was not a member of AAMD or the AAMC, but the director of the museum was a member of the AAMG and the museum itself was an unaccredited member of AAM.

== Lawsuit ==
Brauer and Philipp Brockington filed suit in Indiana state court against the university, arguing that the proposed sale violated the original Sloan trust agreement, which requires revenue from paintings that are sold to be put back into the Sloan purchase fund. The university countered that Brauer's original purchase of an impressionist painting by Hassam and a modernist work by O'Keeffe violated the Sloan agreement, which specified that the funds were only to be used to buy "conservative", or representational, non-abstract works of art. The university also argued that they needed to sell the painting to address their deficit and student decline, and that a dormitory renovation would increase enrollment. The university noted that the Brauer Museum is not professionally accredited, and therefore does not have to follow the ethical standards and guidelines of deaccessioning common to accredited museums. Brauer and Brockington were denied standing by the court. Todd Rokita, the Indiana attorney general, reviewed the case and supported the position taken by Valparaiso.

== Firing of staff and temporary museum closure ==
In June 2024, the university eliminated the position of museum director and 13 other staff members and closed the Brauer Museum indefinitely, citing a restructuring effort. The museum reopened in November 2024, with the former director named curator.
