= José Padilla (academic administrator) =

American academic administrator

19th President of Valparaiso University
- In office February 28, 2021 – December 31, 2025
- Preceded by: Colette Irwin-Knott
- Succeeded by: Rev. Brian E. Konkol, Ph.D.

Personal details
- Born: Augsburg, Bavaria, West Germany (now Germany)
- Party: Democratic
- Spouse: Hilda (m. 1986)
- Children: Jacob • Camille
- Education: University of Toledo; University of Michigan School of Law

José D. Padilla was the 19th President of Valparaiso University. Padilla was most recently vice president, university counsel, and secretary of the University of Colorado system, and previously held similar roles for 15 years at DePaul University.

== Early life and education ==
Padilla was born at a United States Army base in Augsburg, West Germany, and was raised in Toledo, Ohio. He earned a bachelor's degree in elementary education from the University of Toledo and a Juris Doctor from the University of Michigan School of Law.

== Career ==
Padilla began his career practicing law.

Since 2005, Padilla had served as General Counsel at DePaul University and in 2019 became the secretary of the university. In 2010, he was named one of 100 influential Hispanics in the October 2010 edition of the Hispanic Business magazine.

In July 2020, Padilla was selected to be vice president, general counsel and secretary to the Board of Regents at the University of Colorado.

=== President of Valparaiso University (2021–2025) ===
On February 28, 2021, Padilla was inaugurated as the 19th President of Valparaiso University. He is the first Mexican-American and the first Roman Catholic president of this Lutheran university. Upon taking office, Padilla had inherited a university in declining attendance and revenue. In response, he announced a five-year strategic plan called "Uplift Valpo."

Padilla was succeeded by Reverend Brian E. Konkol.

==== Deaccessioning controversy ====
On February 8, 2023, Padilla sent a campus-wide email announcing an update to the five-year strategic plan. As part of the plan, a project was now in the works to renovate the existing first-year freshmen residence halls. "We intend to pay for this initiative through a practice we will use for other parts of the strategic plan. We will consider assets and resources that are not core or critical to our educational mission and strategic plan, and reallocate them to support the plan", Padilla had stated in the email. Though he did not specify what the "assets and resources" were at the time, an article from the Chicago Tribune written by Richard Brauer, the founder of Valparaiso University's Brauer Museum of Art, said three paintings were for sale. It later became known that the works were Mountain Landscape by Frederic Edwin Church, The Silver Veil and the Golden Gate by Childe Hassam, and Rust Red Hills by Georgia O'Keeffe. The O'Keeffe had been in the university's collections since 1962. Valparaiso University's Board of Directors authorized Padilla to sell the paintings in October 2022. Brauer announced that if the sales were to go through, he would pull his name from the museum.

Both Brauer and John Ruff said that the sales would breach the 1953 Sloan Trust Agreement, which mandates that any profits from sales must go toward other art pieces.

The decision also faced backlash from faculty and students, protesting an "erosion of the arts." On February 15, 2023, at least 20 students marched to Heritage Hall to deliver hand-held letters to President Padilla's office. After receiving the letters, Padilla responded by email through University Communications Director Michael Fenton, "The students and I may not agree on this issue. But a university should be an incubator for debate, dialogue, and dissent. If the students are being civil in expressing their heartfelt views, I applaud them for doing so."

Matt Murphy, the Mayor of Valparaiso, Indiana, said he supported Padilla's decision, saying it would benefit both the university and the city.

Padilla's plan has been described as "potentially illegal." The Faculty Senate voted 13–6 in a resolution to denounce the sales. Padilla said if the sales do not happen, he will cut programs and positions to make way for the dorm renovations.

According to an anonymous Faculty Senate member, Padilla said to them that he would "not fundraise by asking old white guys for money."

In June 2024, Jose Padilla announced the elimination of the position of Director of the Brauer Museum and that the museum would remain closed until further notice.

Summer 2024 Layoffs

On June 20, 2024, Jose Padilla announced there were 14 staff positions eliminated as a result of the "Operational Sustainability" plan. These cuts included the Director of the Brauer Museum and shuttering the Brauer Museum. These layoffs were part of a reduction in workforce for Valparaiso University while Jose Padilla's salary remained $500,000+, and students were not notified.

Faculty Vote of No Confidence

On October 23, 2024, the Valparaiso University Faculty Senate approved a vote of no confidence in Padilla (15–2–1). The resolution stated that as university president, Padilla, had not fulfilled his primary responsibilities of fundraising and improving enrollment. It further stated his leadership had resulted in high turnover of key university leadership positions, fostered discontent and insecurity, and eroded the university's reputation and mission.

Announcement of Retirement

On January 22, 2025, Valparaiso University announced that Padilla will retire upon the expiration of his contract on December 31, 2025. The Board of Directors initiated a search for his successor, with Chair-Elect Jon Steinbrecher leading the process. Padilla continued to oversee strategic priorities during his remaining tenure to ensure a smooth transition.

Moody Rating Downgraded

On May 1, 2025, Moody's, the ratings company, cut the university to Ba1 from Baa2, citing the ongoing enrollment challenges, driven by intense competition for a shrinking pool of potential college students, in a note dated Wednesday. The downgrade could raise the school's borrowing costs.

Total headcount at Valparaiso has dropped by nearly 37% in the last ten years, according to the most recent data from the National Center for Education Statistics.

== Personal life ==
Padilla is married to Hilda and the couple have two children. Since being elected President of Valparaiso University, he and his wife, and their two adult children, have lived in Valparaiso, Indiana.

Academic offices
Preceded by Colette Irwin-Knott	19th President of Valparaiso University; 2021-2025	Succeeded by Brian E. Konkol
