= California series by Childe Hassam =

California series of artworks by Childe Hassam

The California series by Childe Hassam is a series of approximately 28 works based on American Impressionist Childe Hassam's visits to Northern California at least three times, in 1904, 1908, and 1914, and Southern California at least once in 1927. The works between 1904 and 1914 feature images from the San Francisco Bay Area, while the 1927–28 works feature images from Los Angeles, San Diego, and Santa Barbara. Out of his approximately 4000 works, Hassam's focus on California is relatively small, with only 12 major California paintings completed between 1914 and 1919. Additional minor works in the series include approximately 16 or so etchings from 1916 to 1928. Most of the works made in 1928 were based on drawings from 1927. 11 of the 12 California paintings were created in 1914 and first exhibited as part of the "California Group" of 106 paintings total in the Exhibition of Pictures by Childe Hassam at the Montross Gallery in New York in 1915. A twelfth painting in the series, California, has been dated to 1919. The majority of Hassam's California etchings were first exhibited at the American Academy of Arts and Letters in 1927.

Historically, Hassam's work as an Impressionist in San Francisco was somewhat unique. Even though the works of the French Impressionists were first popularized in California by San Francisco art galleries in the 1890s, and had their first major public exhibition at the Panama–Pacific International Exposition (PPIE) in 1915, just several years after New York's Armory Show, artists in Northern California remained strongly attached to the style of tonalism, not Impressionism. The vast majority of artists who took up the style of California Impressionism did so in Southern California, not the north, leading to that region serving as the nexus for the short-lived legacy of regional Impressionism in the early 20th century.

Several California artists found inspiration in Hassam's work and painted similar scenes in the Bay Area. In Northern California, members of the Society of Six in Oakland were greatly influenced by the PPIE in 1915, which revealed works by French Impressionists, American Impressionists, Post-Impressionists, and Futurists for the first time in California. Plein-air artists Maurice Logan (1886–1977) and Selden Connor Gile (1877–1947), both members of the Society of Six, later painted works featuring hills in the Bay Area that are reminiscent of Hassam's treatment of similar landforms. Art historian Will South compares Hassam to that of California Impressionist Guy Rose (1867–1925), finding that aside from their personality differences, they took similar career trajectories and even painted the same subjects in New York and California. Nevertheless, the wider art world has mostly ignored California Impressionists and other modernists. In 2002, South observed that large Impressionist exhibitions at the Metropolitan Museum of Art and retrospectives of American modernism all ignored California-based artists.

== Selected works ==
Year	Image	Title	Type	Dimensions	Gallery	Notes
1914		Madroñes Hill	Oil on canvas	Unknown	Unknown	First exhibited 1915
1914		The California Hills (The Little Vineyard)	Oil on canvas	36.5 x 44.5 in	Private collection	Stolen 2019
1914		Spring Morning in California	Oil on canvas	Unknown	Unknown	First exhibited 1915
1914		Telegraph Hill	Oil on canvas	24 1/8 (61.3 cm) x 24 1/8 in (61.3 cm)	White House Collection	Gift of Mr. and Mrs. John Dimick
1914		The Eucalyptus in Blossom	Oil on canvas	Unknown	Unknown	First exhibited 1915
1914		The Silver Veil and the Golden Gate	Oil on canvas	30 in (76 cm) × 32 in (81 cm)	Brauer Museum of Art	Deaccessioning in process
1914		California Hills, In Spring	Oil on canvas	30 × 32 in	American Academy of Arts and Letters	Hassam bequest, 1936
1914		Hill of the Sun, San Anselmo, California	Oil on canvas	31.5 in × 31.75 in	Oakland Museum of California	Gift of the Oakland Museum Women's Board in honor of George W. Neubert
1914		Eucalyptus Trees–Spring (California Hills back of Tamalpais)	Oil on canvas	Unknown	Norton Museum of Art	Gift of Dr. S. Charles and Marcella Ungar Werblow 2016
1914		San Anselmo	Oil on canvas	Unknown	Unknown	First exhibited 1915
1914		Point Lobos	Oil on canvas	28.3 in (71.9 cm) × 36.1 in (91.9 cm)	Los Angeles County Museum of Art	Mr. and Mrs. William Preston Harrison Collection
1916		Old Chinatown, San Francisco	Etching	5 3/16 in (13.18 cm) × 4 15/16 in (12.54 cm)	National Gallery of Art	Made from a 1904 drawing Gift of Mrs. Childe Hassam
1919		California	Oil on Canvas	24 (61 cm) × 43 in (109.2 cm)	Private collection	Sold at auction 2017
1927		Contours of Los Angeles	Etching	6 × 10 7/16 in	Unknown	Stays at the Mayfair Hotel by March 2 First exhibited in 1927
1927		Eucalyptus Trees, Coronado	Etching	9 7/8 × 10 13/16 in	Unknown	Stays at the Hotel del Coronado by March 16; First exhibited in 1927
1927		Coronado Beach, California	Etching	9 × 13 1/8 in	Unknown	First exhibited in 1927
1927		Point Loma, California	Etching	9 3/16 × 13 3/16 in	The San Diego Museum of Art	Gift of Mrs. Childe Hassam
1927		Edward Borein in Santa Barbara	Etching	20.3 cm (8 in) × 15.2 cm (6 in)	Santa Barbara Historical Museum	Stays at El Mirasol Hotel by March 25; First exhibited in 1927; Gift of Amy and Steve Macfarlane
1927		The Plaza de la Guerra	Etching	6 7/8 × 9	Unknown	First exhibited in 1927
1927		Corpus Christi from Point Loma	Etching			
1927		Coronado and Point Loma	Etching		Unknown	
1927		A California Oil Field	Etching	8 7/8 × 13 7/8	Unknown	First exhibited in 1927
1927		Point Loma (Version A)	Etching		Unknown	
1927		Giants and Pygmies	Etching	8 3/8 in (21.27 cm) × 11 in (27.94 cm)	Frances Lehman Loeb Art Center	Gift of Mrs. Childe Hassam
1928		Point Loma (Version B)	Etching		Unknown	
1928		The Giant	Etching		Unknown	From a 1927 drawing
1928		The Redwoods	Etching		Unknown	From a 1927 drawing
1928		California	Etching		Unknown	From a 1927 drawing
