= Lasansky =

Lasansky is a surname. Notable people with the surname include:

- Diego Lasansky (born 1994), American painter
- Mauricio Lasansky (1914–2012), Argentine artist and educator
- Tomas Lasansky (born 1957), American artist
