= Valparaiso Beacons =

College sports teams representing Valparaiso University

- University: Valparaiso University
- Nickname: Beacons
- NCAA: Division I (FCS)
- Conference: MVC (primary); Pioneer Football League (football); C-USA (women's bowling)
- Athletic director: Laurel Hosmer
- Location: Valparaiso, Indiana
- Varsity teams: 19
- Football stadium: Brown Field
- Basketball arena: Athletics–Recreation Center
- Baseball stadium: Emory G. Bauer Field
- Soccer stadium: Brown Field
- Colors: Brown and gold
- Mascot: Beacon (Golden Retriever) & Blaze (Chocolate Labrador Retriever)
- Website: valpoathletics.com

The Valparaiso Beacons is the name of the athletic teams from Valparaiso University – often referred to as Valpo – in Valparaiso, Indiana, United States. The Beacons compete in the National Collegiate Athletic Association (NCAA) at the Division I level and are members of the Missouri Valley Conference in all sports except football and bowling.

On May 8, 2017, the Missouri Valley Conference (MVC) extended an invitation to Valparaiso to join the conference effective July 1, 2017. Valparaiso accepted the invitation on May 25. The men's teams in swimming and tennis moved to the Summit League when Valparaiso joined the MVC. The Valparaiso football team remains in the Pioneer Football League, and the bowling team remained in the Southland Bowling League (SBL) until that league agreed to merge into Conference USA (C-USA) after the 2022–23 bowling season.

On November 20, 2019, Valpo announced that the men's soccer and tennis teams would be eliminated to allow greater attention to the school's other sports teams. Men's swimming moved to the Mid-American Conference in 2021, before coming under the MVC when the conference resumed sponsoring men's swimming prior to the 2024–25 season. Valparaiso became a C-USA bowling associate after that league absorbed the SBL.

Formerly named the Crusaders, the university dropped that name and associated mascot and logos in 2021, because of the "negative connotation and violence associated with the Crusader imagery", specifically its appropriation by hate groups such as the Ku Klux Klan.

== Overview ==
=== Conference affiliation ===
Valparaiso University first joined a Division I conference in 1982 when the men's basketball team joined the Mid-Continent Conference. Other sports joined conferences in later years.

Years	Football	Men's basketball	Women's basketball
1982–1987	Division II	Mid-Continent	
1987–1989	Division II	Mid-Continent	North Star
1989–1992	Division II	Mid-Continent	North Star
1992–1993	Division II	Mid-Continent	Mid-Continent
1993–2007	Pioneer FL	Mid-Continent	Mid-Continent
2007–2017	Pioneer FL	Horizon	
2017–present	Pioneer FL	Missouri Valley	

=== Venues ===
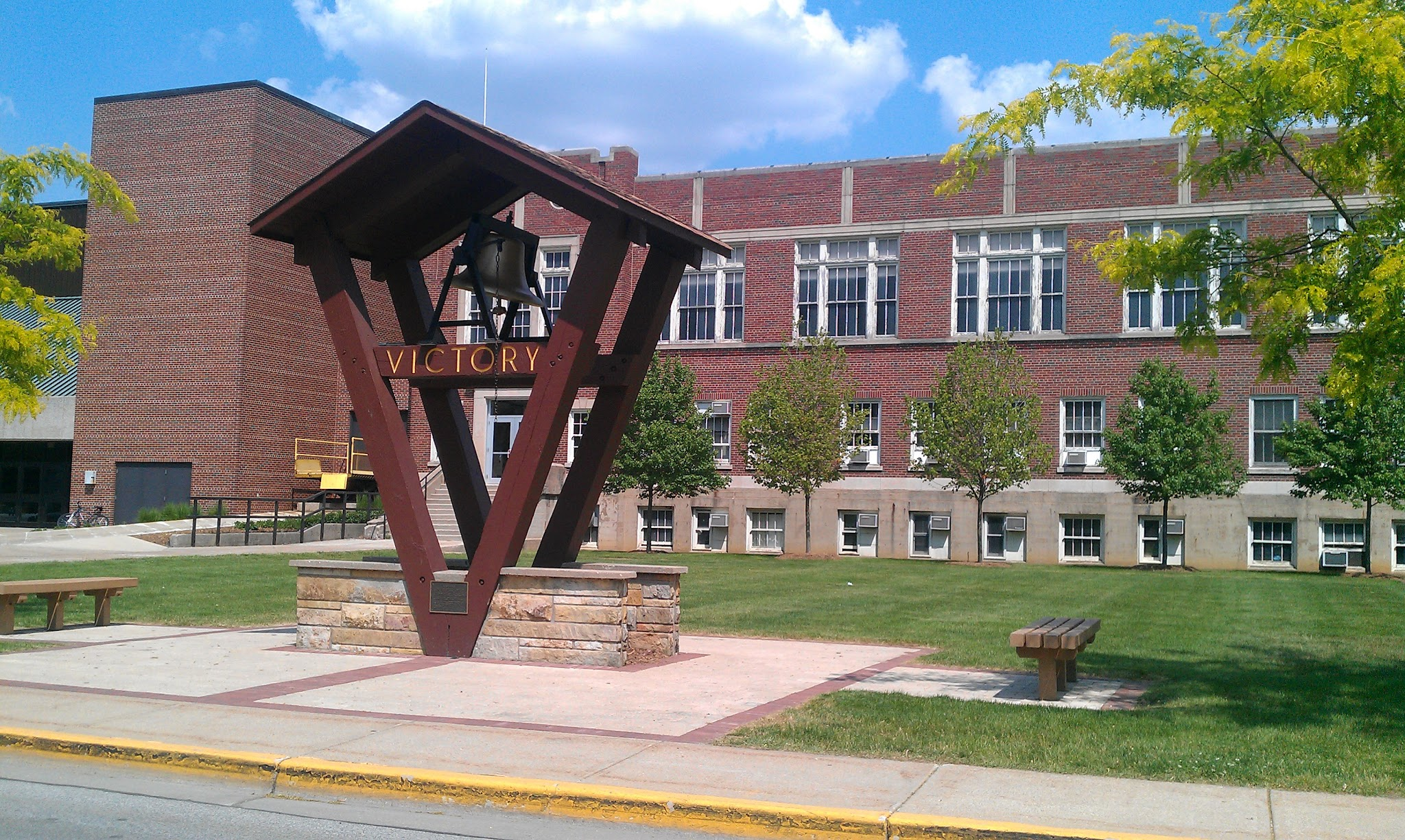
Victory Bell in front of the old Hilltop Gym and ARC

VU plays its home football games, as well as men's and women's soccer games, at Brown Field, which has a seating capacity of 5,000 people and opened in 1919. Surrounding Brown Field is the Warren G. Hoger Track, home to the track and field teams. The basketball, swimming, and volleyball teams play at the adjacent Athletics-Recreation Center (ARC), which has a capacity of 5,000. The VU's baseball team plays at Emory G. Bauer Field. The tennis teams use the Valparaiso University Tennis Complex. The cross-country teams compete at Sunset Hills Farm.

=== Mascot ===
After years of going without one, Valparaiso University pursued a mascot in 1931. The Uhlan was chosen over the Dunesmen and the Vandals. After debate in 1941 over choosing a mascot less proximate to the Nazi cause, the Crusader was chosen as the new mascot in 1942. The original illustrated mascot was penned by a Disney artist and trademarked in 1951, and used until 2010, when the school rebranded itself athletically and academically.

After years of discussions and deliberations, the Interim President of Valparaiso University Colette Irwin-Knott sent a letter on February 11, 2021, announcing the retirement of the university mascot, the Crusader. This decision was made after a recommendation from a task force created by the Interim President made up of student, faculty, staff, Athletics, and alumni representatives. The task force received around 7,700 survey feedback from the Valparaiso University community. "The task force determined the Crusader is not reflective of Valpo’s mission to promote a welcoming and inclusive community."

On August 10, 2021, the university announced that it will now go by the Valparaiso Beacons.

== Sports sponsored ==
Men's sports	Women's sports
Baseball	Basketball
Basketball	Bowling
Cross country	Cross country
Football	Golf
Golf	Soccer
Swimming	Softball
Track and field^{†}	Swimming
	Tennis
	Track and field^{†}
	Volleyball
† – Track and field includes both indoor and outdoor.

A member of the Missouri Valley Conference, Valparaiso sponsors teams in ten men's and eleven women's NCAA sanctioned sports.

=== Football ===
The Valparaiso football program was started in 1919, as prior to this point the administration believed athletics were a distraction from academic pursuits. George Keogan, who also coached the men's basketball team, was the first coach. The first game was October 4 at Brown Field, a win over the Chicago YMCA team 26–0. The team had a 5–3 record that year. In 1943 and 1944, the Crusaders did not field a football team due to World War II.

Valparaiso resumed its football program in 1945. It joined the Indiana Collegiate Conference in 1950 and remained a member of the ICC in all sports until 1978. The post-war years began a tremendous run of coaching stability. They hired Emory Bauer in 1946. Bauer would coach the team until 1967. Walt Reiner would also coach the team from 1957 until 1964. Until 2006, only four other men would coach Valparaiso. This includes Stacy Adams who in 2005 became the university's first African American head coach.

In 1978, Valparaiso joined the Heartland Collegiate Conference. In 1990, Valparaiso moved to the Midwest Intercollegiate Football Conference. During their time in these conferences, they would lose more often than win.

==== Division I ====
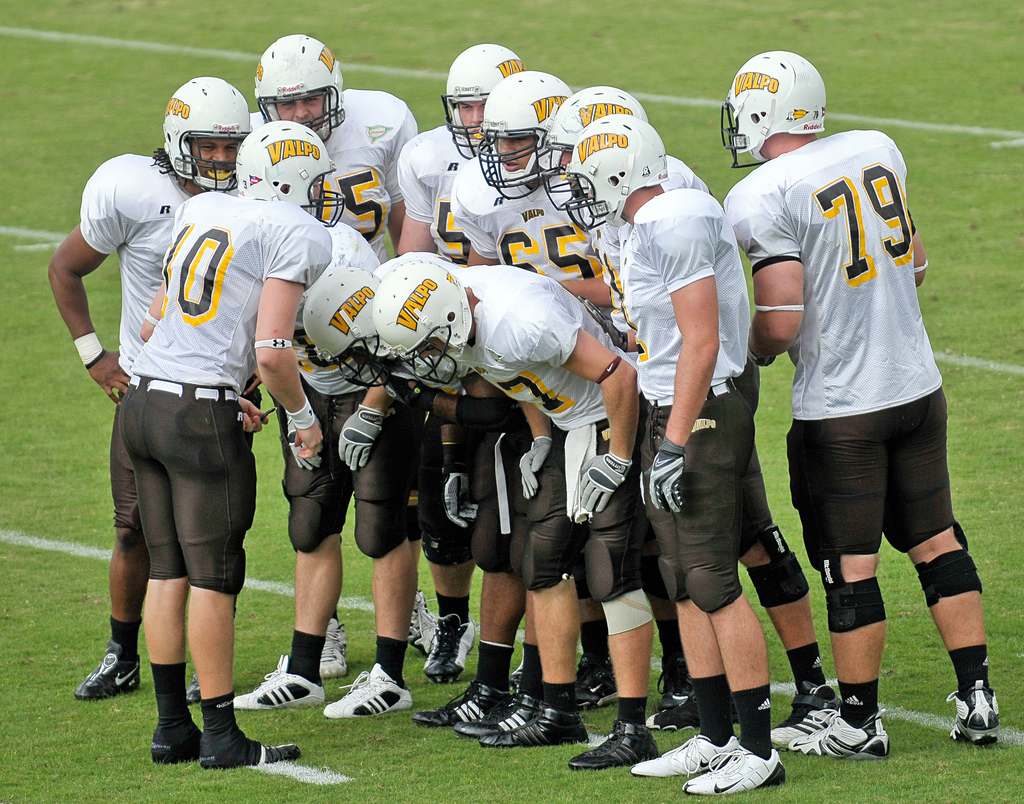
Valparaiso players in a huddle

In 1993, the NCAA mandated that schools playing Division I basketball may only play football in Division I. Valparaiso along with five other schools formed the Pioneer Football League, where they remain today. Playing primarily against non-scholarship teams, Valparaiso reversed their fortunes. They won their first outright championship in 2003, when they won the PFL championship game.

==== Bowl games ====
Date	Bowl	Opponent	Score
January 1, 1951	Cigar Bowl	Wisconsin–La Crosse	L 14–47

=== Baseball ===
The Valparaiso baseball team advanced to the NCAA tournament in 2012, where they lost to play Purdue and Kentucky in the Gary Regional. The regional was played at the U.S. Steel Yard. Valparaiso advanced in 2013 after winning their second straight Horizon League title, where they lost to Indiana, eliminated Florida, and lost to Austin Peay in the Bloomington Regional.

=== Men's basketball ===
The Valparaiso basketball program began in 1917. As a Division II school, Valparaiso appeared in Division II NCAA tournaments five times, advancing to the Elite Eight twice. They became a Division I school in 1978. From 1988 to 2016, the team was coached by Homer Drew, his son Scott Drew, or his other son Bryce Drew. Under the Drews, Valparaiso won 10 conference tournament championships and appeared in the NCAA tournament nine times. Valparaiso is currently coached by Roger Powell Jr. and play their home games at the Athletics–Recreation Center.

=== Women's basketball ===
The Valparaiso women's basketball team started play during the 1971-1972 season. The team joined the North Star Conference for the 1987–88 season. In 1990–91, Valparaiso reached the finals of the North Star Conference Tournament before losing to DePaul. Valparaiso's best season in the North Star Conference was 1991–1992. That year, they finished with a record of 20–9. The 1992–93 season was their first season in the Mid-Continent Conference (now known as The Summit League). Valparaiso advanced to the NCAA tournament in 2003 and 2004 seasons under coach Keith Freeman.

Valparaiso lost in the first round each of these years, to Purdue and Kansas State, respectively. Marlous Nieuwveen is the only member to appear in a WNBA game. Debbie Bolen (1989–1993) and hall of fall class of 1999, is the current holder of 18 single game records, season and career women's basketball individual records including points scored, scoring average, most field goals, most free throws, assists, and steals.

=== Women's Cross Country ===
Missouri Valley Conference logo in Valpo's colors

The women's cross-country team attained varsity status in 1988.

=== Field hockey ===
The field hockey team was dropped in 1987.

=== Men's golf ===
The Valparaiso men's golf team existed from 1934 until spring 1992.

=== Women's golf ===
In 1964, Patti Shook won the women's individual intercollegiate golf championship (an event conducted by the Division of Girls' and Women's Sports (DGWS) — which later evolved into the current NCAA women's golf championship).

=== Women's gymnastics ===
The women's gymnastics team was discontinued in 1992.

=== Women's soccer ===
The women's soccer team played its inaugural varsity game in 1993.

=== Softball ===
The Valparaiso softball team has won three Horizon League softball championships in the last six years and advanced to the NCAA tournament three times. Valpo won the Horizon League for the first time and advanced to the NCAA tournament in 2012, where they lost to Louisville in the first round of the Louisville Regional. In the second round, Valparaiso lost to Kentucky.

The Valparaiso softball team repeated as Horizon League champions and advanced to the NCAA tournament in 2013, where they lost to Michigan in the first round of the Ann Arbor Regional. In the second round, Valparaiso eliminated Central Michigan. However, they lost to California in the third round.

Valpo captured its third Horizon League title in a five-year span and advanced to the NCAA tournament in 2016. Valparaiso was sent to the Ann Arbor Regional, where they lost to Michigan and Notre Dame.

=== Men's tennis ===
In 2016, Valparaiso won their first Horizon League regular season and tournament championship defeating defending champion Wisconsin-Green Bay 4–0 in the Horizon League Championship. The win clinched Valpo's first NCAA tournament berth in program history where they fell to Northwestern 4–1 in the first round, recording the first point a Horizon League school had won in the NCAA tournament in 22 years.

November 20, 2019, Valpo announced the discontinuation of the Men's tennis and soccer programs at the conclusion of the 2019–2020 seasons. With 21 Division I teams, Valpo had the most athletic programs of any school in the Missouri Valley Conference and more than the majority of its Division I national peer institutions. The decision allowed the university to better focus on providing the best possible experience for all student-athletes while providing the best opportunity for competing successfully within the Missouri Valley Conference and the department's single sport conferences.

=== Track and field ===
The track and field team was eliminated in 1987. A new team began competition in January 1996 In 2007, the women's team finished in third place in the Mid-Continent Conference championships, only losing to Southern Utah and Oral Roberts. The men's team finished fifth. In addition, sophomore Laura Rolf was named an All-American in the mile run, finishing tenth at the NCAA Indoor Track and Field Championship.

On October 11, 2014, the Warren G. Hoger Track was officially dedicated by University President Mark Heckler, donor Jay Christopher, Warren Hoger, athletic director Mark LaBarbera, head coach Ryan Moore and athlete Alex Vasile. The ribbon was cut on Brown Field during the halftime of the Valparaiso football game.

The Valparaiso University Track and Field team is made of men and women competing in different events including sprints, distance, jumps and throws. The team competes in an indoor and outdoor season both leading up to its conference championships.

=== Wrestling ===
The wrestling team was disbanded in 1995.
