= Rust Red Hills =

Painting by Georgia O'Keeffe

- Artist: Georgia O'Keeffe
- Year: 1930
- Dimensions: 16 in (41 cm) × 30 in (76 cm)
- Location: Brauer Museum of Art
- Accession no.: 62.02

Rust Red Hills is a 1930 landscape painting by American artist Georgia O'Keeffe. It depicts red and brown hills under a glowing red and yellow sky in northern New Mexico, most likely in the vicinity of Taos. At its initial exhibition in 1931, O'Keeffe indicated that it was one of her own best-loved paintings from that time period. The work is currently held by the Brauer Museum of Art, but in 2023, Valparaiso University, which runs the museum, announced they planned to sell the painting and two others to raise money to renovate the student dormitories. Art associations protested the pending sale as an ethical violation of the deaccessioning process.

== Background ==
Georgia O'Keeffe's relationship with New Mexico, which would later become part of her artistic identity, was ignited by a brief visit to the state with her sister in 1917 and deepened through her interactions with her friends in the 1920s, including Paul Strand, Rebecca Salsbury James, Paul Rosenfeld, and Dorothy Brett, all of whom shared vivid accounts of their experiences in the region, piquing O'Keeffe's curiosity. It was not until 1929 that she accepted an invitation from Mabel Dodge Luhan, a key figure in the Taos art colony. For the next two summers, from 1929 to 1930, O'Keeffe painted throughout Taos, Alcade, and near Abiquiu. The region's southwestern Pueblo architecture, cultural motifs, and stark natural beauty unique to the geography of New Mexico found profound expression in her work. O'Keeffe's artistic output during this period includes her series on the San Francisco de Asís Mission Church (Ranchos Church, Taos, 1929; Ranchos Church, 1930), an exploration of local religious iconography and architectural form, and the iconography of the Penitentes (Black Cross, New Mexico, 1929), a devout religious group known for their distinctive crosses. She also found herself fascinated with the vast, rugged landscapes, turning her attention to hills and mountains (Black Mesa Landscape, New Mexico/Out Back of Marie's II, 1930; The Mountain, New Mexico, 1931). One painting from this series, Mountain at Bear Lake — Taos (1930), was gifted to the White House in 1997 and currently hangs in the White House Library as part of the permanent White House art collection.

== Development ==
In 1930, Georgia O'Keeffe created 54 works, some of which were created in Maine and New York, though the majority were completed in New Mexico. In April of that year, she continued her exploration of natural forms in Maine, expanding on her ongoing shell series first initiated in the 1920s (Shell and Old Shingle I, Shell and Old Shingle VII, 1926; Shell No. 2, 1928) and continuing sporadically into the 1930s (Clam Shell, 1930; Two Pink Shells/Pink Shell, 1937). By May, O'Keeffe was painting in Lake George, New York (Lake George Early Moonrise, 1930). During her second stay in New Mexico, from June to September, O'Keeffe completed Rust Red Hills, also known as Hills - Back of Mabel's, Taos, and the alternate title Toward Abiquiu, New Mexico. This painting was one of approximately 19 works she completed in the summer of 1930, including both drawings and paintings, centered on the region's distinctive hills, mesas, and mountains in and around the towns of Taos, Alcade, and the areas surrounding Abiquiu.

== Depiction ==
It is now believed the painting was made in the area of Taos, New Mexico. Previously, it was thought that the painting depicted the hills near the town of Abiquiu. Despite misnomers in several titles of related works (such as Near Abiquiu, New Mexico, 1930, which was made near Taos, not Abiquiu), partially caused by Stieglitz or others adding erroneous titles to the paintings before they were corrected by O'Keeffe, some of the works in this series may have been completed north of the Taos Pueblo, not in Abiquiu, depicting different views of Lobo Peak in the Sangre de Cristo Mountains.

== Provenance ==
General Mills purchased the work for their employee art collection in 1958 from the Downtown Gallery in Greenwich Village, New York City. It was exhibited in Minneapolis and lent out to various museums. The 1953 Percy H. Sloan endowment to Valparaiso University allowed Richard H. W. Brauer to purchase Rust Red Hills for the university art museum in 1962 for $5,700. He was able to authenticate the work directly with Georgia O'Keeffe. It was the second painting acquired by the new museum and was added to the permanent collection of what was later renamed the Brauer Museum of Art.

== Deaccessioning ==
In early 2023, Valparaiso University, led by president José Padilla, announced plans to sell three significant paintings, including Georgia O'Keeffe's Rust Red Hills, to fund dormitory renovations amidst financial struggles and declining enrollment. The proposal ignited protests from faculty, students and the larger art community. Valparaiso defended their plan, arguing that the artworks were not essential to its educational mission. With the O'Keeffe painting alone being worth between $10-15 million, the proposed sale of all three paintings would allow Valparaiso to raise the needed funds. The deaccessioning was opposed by the Association of Art Museum Directors (AAMD), the American Alliance of Museums (AAM), the Association of Academic Museums and Galleries (AAMG), and the Association of Art Museum Curators (AAMC), citing ethical guidelines that generally restrict the use of deaccessioned art funds for purposes unrelated to art. Richard H. W. Brauer filed a lawsuit, but he failed to establish standing and it was dismissed. In June 2024, Padilla closed the Brauer Museum and laid off all staff. With the museum closed, Rust Red Hills is currently secured in an off-site storage area as of September 2024.

== Exhibitions ==
The painting was first exhibited at Alfred Stieglitz's An American Place gallery in 1931, where it was shown without a visible title, despite the title (Hills - Back of Mabel's, Taos) appearing on the stretcher bar on the verso. Here, O'Keeffe signed her initials within a star, a symbol she used to mark a selected painting she personally preferred as special and well liked. Several decades later, the painting appeared in a 1953 exhibition tour at the Dallas Museum of Art and the Mayo Hill Galleries in Florida. It has been included in touring exhibitions in 1961, 1965, 1980, 2004, 2008, and in 2013, appearing throughout the United States, Canada, Ireland, and Spain. The painting also appeared at the Tate Modern in 2016 in the United Kingdom.

- Georgia O'Keeffe: Recent Paintings, New Mexico, New York, Etc. -- Etc. (1931)
- An Exhibition of Paintings by Georgia O'Keeffe (1953)
- American Business and the Arts (1961)
- Georgia O'Keeffe (1965)
- Georgia O'Keeffe An Exhibition of Oils, Watercolors and Drawings (1980)
- Georgia O'Keeffe and New Mexico: A Sense of Place (2004)
- Georgia O'Keeffe and Ansel Adams (2008)
- Georgia O'Keeffe in New Mexico: Architecture, Katsinam, and the Land (2013)
- Georgia O'Keeffe (2016)
