= The Silver Veil and the Golden Gate =

1914 painting by Childe Hassam

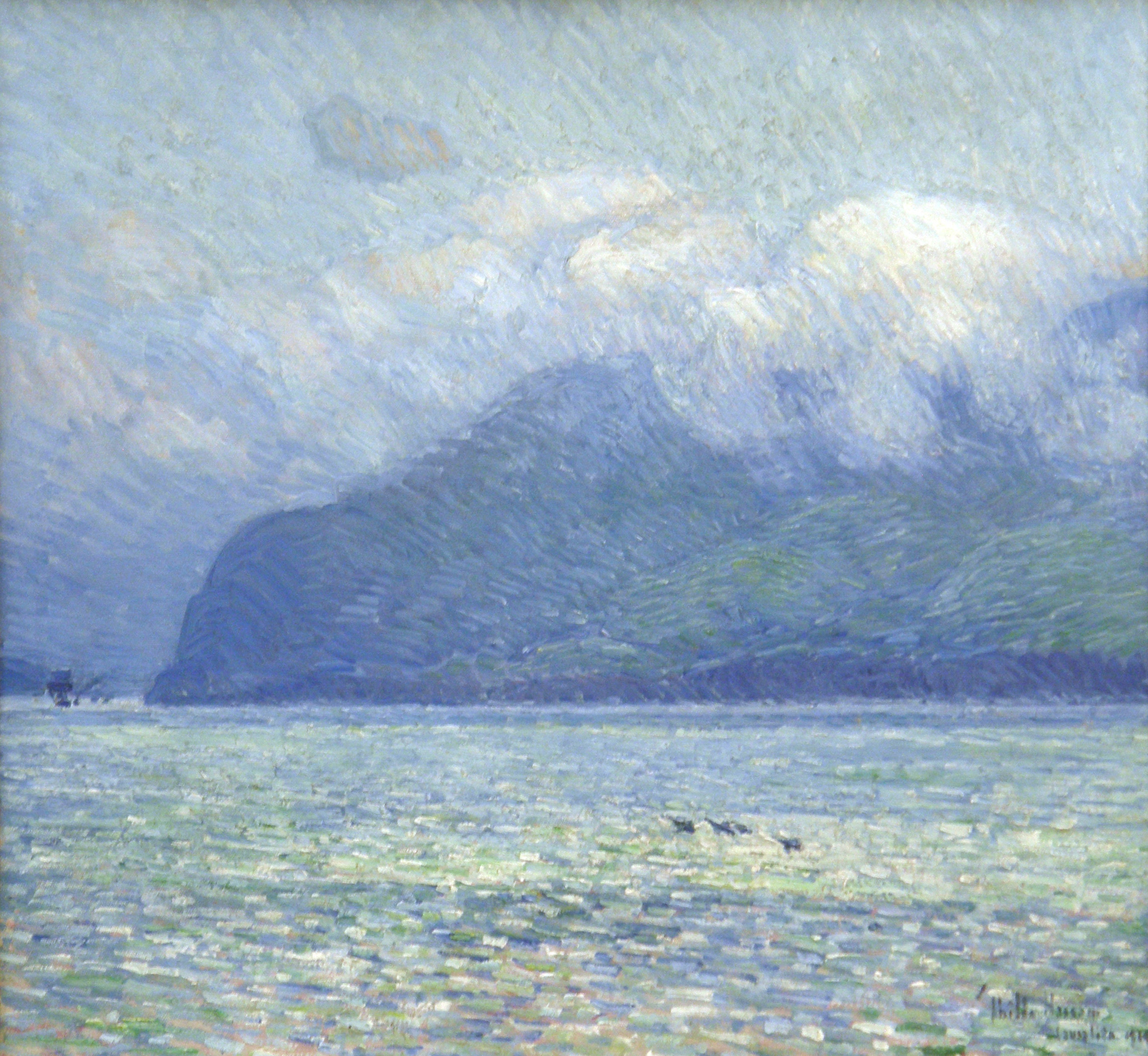
- Artist: Childe Hassam
- Year: 1914
- Medium: oil paint, canvas
- Dimensions: 30 in (76 cm) × 32 in (81 cm)
- Location: Brauer Museum of Art
- Accession: 67.02

The Silver Veil and the Golden Gate is a late period, coastal landscape painting by American Impressionist Childe Hassam. Completed in 1914 during one of his visits to California, the piece depicts the Golden Gate Strait, a narrow passage connecting the San Francisco Bay to the Pacific Ocean, as seen near Sausalito. The "silver veil" refers to the San Francisco fog that frequently envelops the region.

Hassam spent several months in the Bay Area in the late winter and early spring, completing preparations on a mural for the Panama–Pacific International Exposition to be held the next year. After installing the mural at the Palace of Fine Arts, Hassam traveled around Northern California, from Sonoma to Point Lobos, painting along the way with fellow artists. The painting of the Golden Gate belongs to this California series comprising at least a dozen works, 11 of which were completed by Hassam during this single visit.

In 2023, Valparaiso University announced its intention to sell the artwork, aiming to raise funds for the construction of new student dormitories. The decision was controversial, with Valparaiso arguing in court that the original acquisition of the painting in 1967 had never aligned with the conservative ethos prescribed by the Sloan Trust.

== Description ==
The Marin Headlands peninsula, as it appeared before the completion of the Golden Gate Bridge in 1937, looms large in the painting. From the vantage point of Sausalito, an ethereal fog is seen, a silver veil gracefully enveloping the hills above the San Francisco Bay, merging with the landscape and creating a harmonious symphony of cool tones in the upper right. The heavy reliance on blue color evokes the cool climate of the Bay Area with its marine atmosphere and coastal stratus. The work is signed in blue and red paint on the bottom right of the canvas, Childe Hassam / Sausalito 1914.

== Background ==
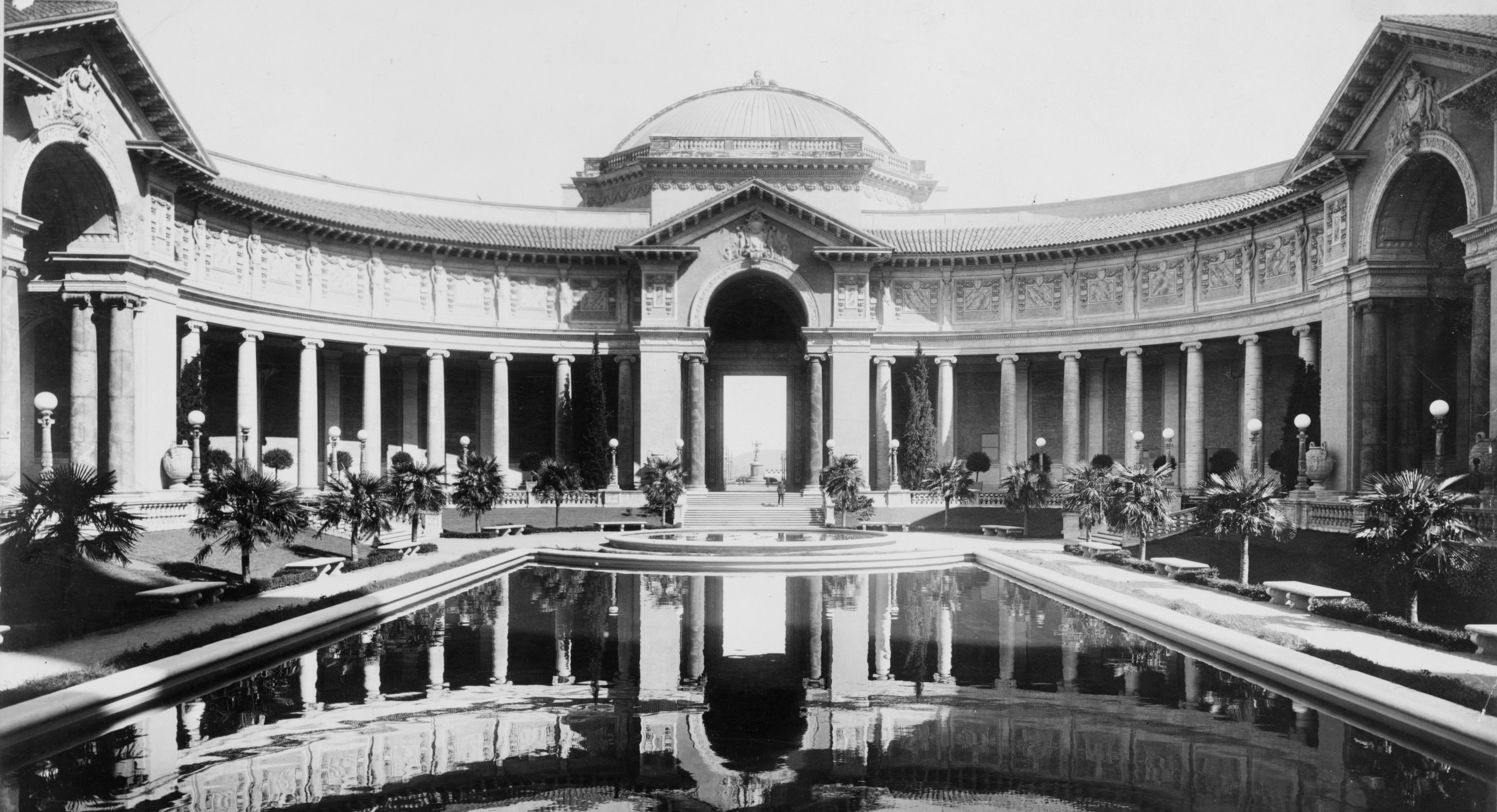
The Court of Palms; facade of the Palace of Education (left)

Childe Hassam (1859–1935) worked as an Impressionist artist in New York and New England, but he made several trips to the San Francisco Bay Area throughout his career. Hassam visited Northern California at least three times, in 1904, 1908, and 1914, and toured Southern California at least once in 1927. Out of his approximately 4000 works, Hassam's focus on California is relatively small, with only 12 major California works completed between 1904 and 1927. There are additional minor works in the series, mostly etchings. By 1912, Hassam had become highly recognized as an artist, winning more than 20 awards for his work. In January 1913, architect Henry Bacon (1866–1924), who engineered and designed the Lincoln Memorial, helped Hassam receive a commission to paint a mural for the upcoming Panama–Pacific International Exposition (PPIE) in San Francisco. A month later, a dozen of his works appeared at the Armory Show in New York City until mid-March, then traveling to the Art Institute of Chicago, where Hassam showed 13 paintings on the second leg of the tour.

== Development ==
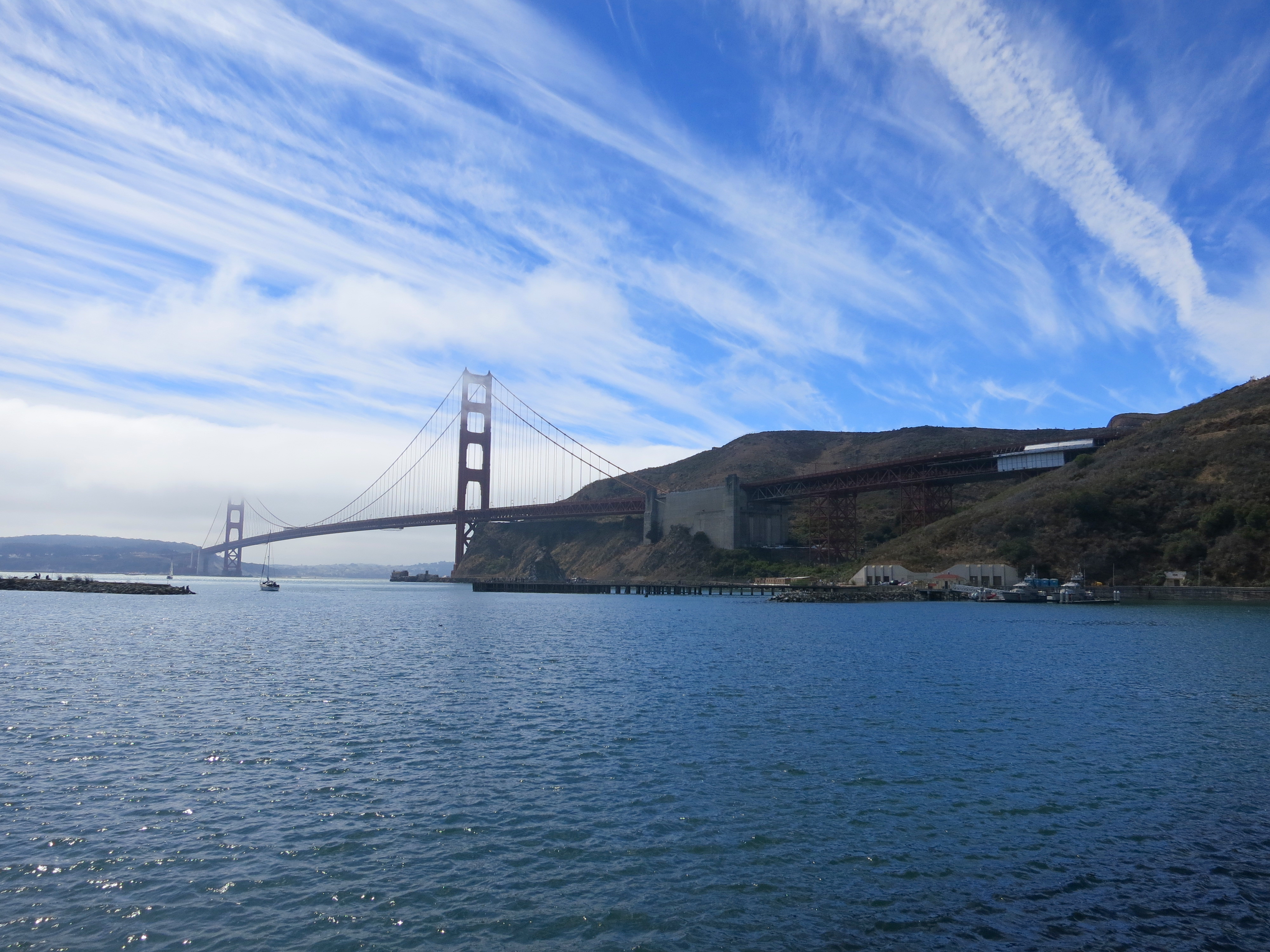
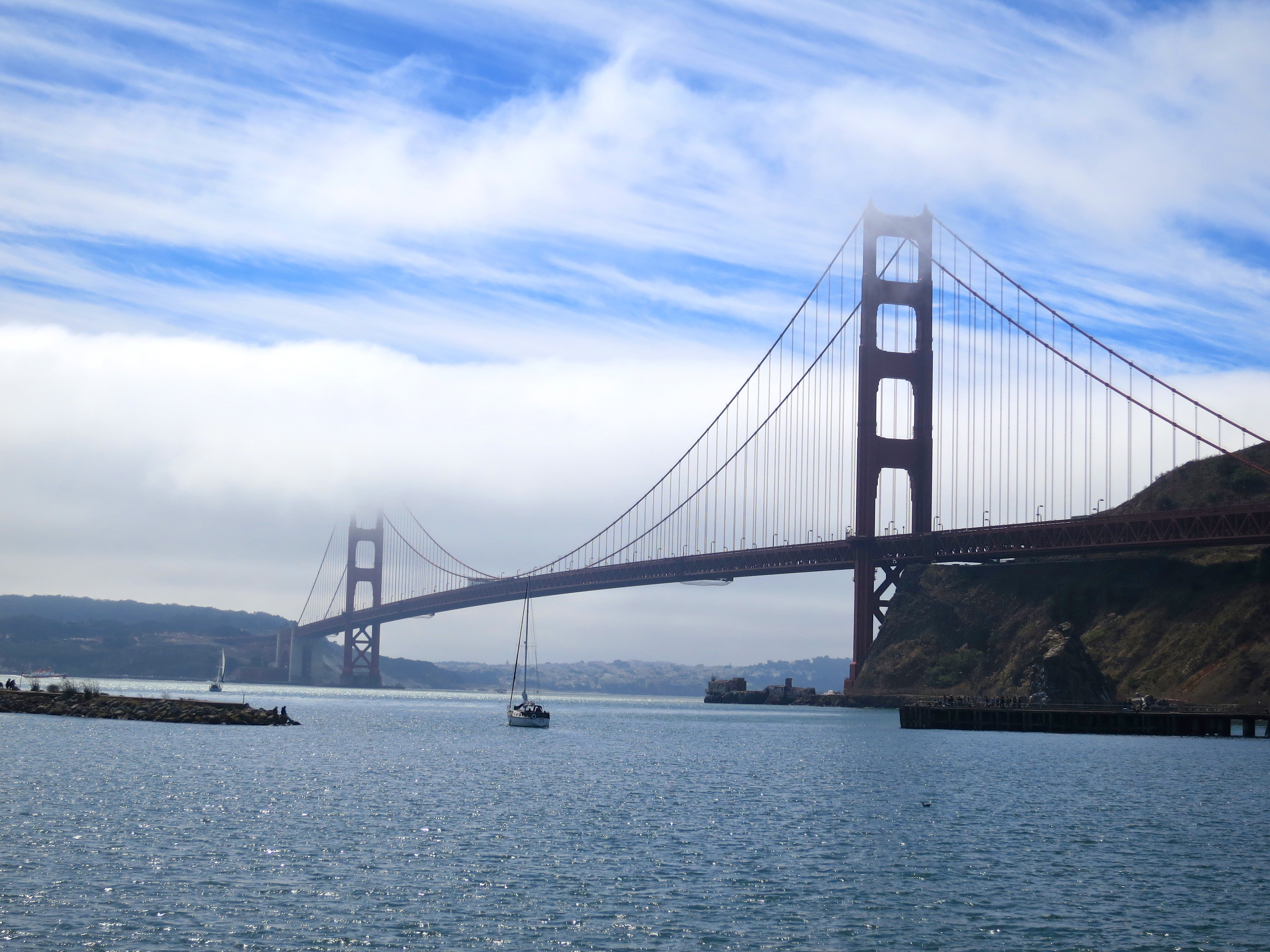
Golden Gate Strait viewed from the Sausalito side (2012)

In February of 1914, Hassam voyaged to California to prepare his mural for the Exposition the following year. In San Francisco, he was joined by other artists, including Edward Simmons (1852–1931), Robert Reid (1862–1929), William de Leftwich Dodge (1867–1935), and Arthur Frank Mathews (1860–1945), who also contributed murals to the Exposition. Hassam, Simmons, and Reid had first completed their murals at home in New York before arriving in the city. The artists installed their murals at the Palace of Fine Arts, with Hassam placing his mural, Fruits and Flowers, in a lunette above the entrance of the Palace of Education, on the west side. Hassam would later exhibit 38 paintings at the Exposition in 1915, but would not attend. In March, all three artists exhibited their work at the Palace Hotel in San Francisco, with Hassam showing 11 paintings. The exhibition later traveled to Los Angeles in June.

During his visit, Hassam stayed at the Bohemian Club and visited Bohemian Grove, where he attended the Grove Play with Simmons. He was also hospitalized after a brief illness. In the city, he completed the painting Telegraph Hill and traveled across the San Francisco Bay where he painted in Sausalito, completing The Silver Veil and the Golden Gate, a coastal landscape focusing on the beauty of the bay and the structure and arrangement of the fog and clouds. The painting is similar in scope and approach to works he previously completed in Oregon. Hassam continued painting landscapes in San Anselmo (Hill of the Sun, San Anselmo, California) along with Simmons who painted the same scene as Hassam but from a different position (Bosom of the Land, San Anselmo, California). Traveling next to Carmel, Hassam worked with artist Francis John McComas (1875–1938) in Point Lobos, finally leaving California in March. Eleven of the 12 California paintings that were created in 1914 were first exhibited as part of the "California Group" of 106 paintings total in the Exhibition of Pictures by Childe Hassam at the Montross Gallery in New York in 1915.

== Reception ==
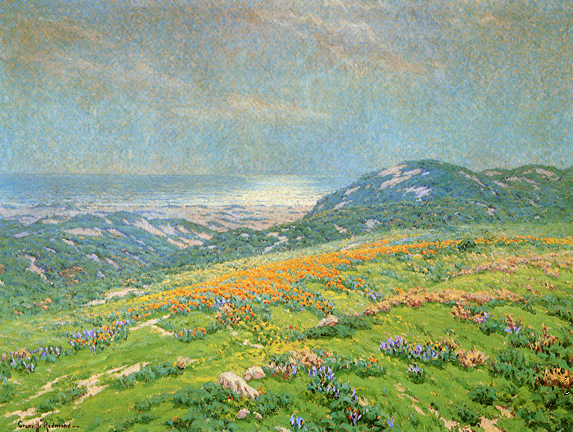
Silver and Gold (1918) by Granville Redmond

The painting was first reviewed at an exhibition in 1915 at the Montross Gallery in New York. It was among more than 100 works that were shown, of which 22 were oil paintings. Of this group, there were a total of 11 paintings shown in the California series, of which Spring Morning in California, Spring Afternoon in the California Hills, and The Silver Veil and the Golden Gate were described in a review for American Art News. Art critic "A. v. C." made note of the filtered sunlight effects common to Impressionism and remarked that the painting of The Silver Veil and the Golden Gate was reminiscent of J. M. W. Turner (1775–1851). Art historian Susan Landauer believes Hassam's painting influenced California Impressionist Granville Redmond (1871–1935), particularly in his work Silver and Gold (1918).

Curator Nancy Boas and art historian Marc Simpson consider The Silver Veil and the Golden Gate one of Hassam's best works in the California series. Historically, Hassam's work as an Impressionist in San Francisco was somewhat unique. Even though the works of the French Impressionists were first popularized in California by San Francisco art galleries in the 1890s, and had their first major public exhibition at the PPIE in 1915, artists in Northern California remained strongly attached to the style of tonalism, not Impressionism. The vast majority of artists who took up the style of California Impressionism did so in Southern California, not the north, leading to that region serving as the nexus for the short-lived legacy of regional Impressionism in the early 20th century.

== Provenance ==
Upon Hassam's death in 1935, The Silver Veil and the Golden Gate was part of a more than 400-piece artwork bequest to the American Academy of Arts and Letters. The painting was put up for sale sometime before 1964 and purchased by Valparaiso University in 1967 for $9,000 with income from the Sloan fund. It was appraised at $3.5 million in 2024. In 2023, Valparaiso University, facing financial pressures amidst declining enrollment and a deficit, announced plans to sell The Silver Veil and the Golden Gate and two other paintings in their collection to help fund dormitory renovations to attract new students. This decision raised questions about the ethics of deaccessioning—a process governed by ethical museum guidelines that typically mandate reinvesting the proceeds of artwork sales back into the museum's collection. Valparaiso proposed selling three paintings in their art collection, arguing in court that two of the three paintings, Rust Red Hills and The Silver Veil and the Golden Gate, should never have been bought in the first place, as they were classified as modern art (Note: In re Percy H. Sloan Charitable Trust, Valparaiso University argued that Hassam was an American impressionist whose painting The Silver Veil and The Golden Gate did not meet the Trust's stipulation of conservative art at the time of acquisition. As evidence for their argument, the university produced a letter from 1961, in which professor Richard Brauer "professes his 'strong bias for modem art' and attempts to convince the Committee that it should no longer limit the art purchases to conservative art but expand its purchases into modern art." Impressionism is generally considered a modern art movement that broke away from the conservatism of academic art. It is a 19th-century precursor to modernism, which emerged fully formed in the 20th century.) that did not meet the requirements for "conservative art" acquisitions stipulated by the Sloan Trust, whose funds were used to originally purchase the paintings.

== Selected exhibitions ==
- Exhibition of Pictures by Childe Hassam, Montross Gallery, New York, 1915
- St. Botolph Club, Boston, 1916
- Buffalo Fine Arts Academy, 1916
- Childe Hassam in Indiana, Ball State University Art Gallery, 1985
- Childe Hassam: Impressionist in the West, Portland Art Museum, 2004
