= Mark A. Heckler =

American academic administrator

18th President of Valparaiso University
- In office 2008–2020
- Preceded by: Alan Harre
- Succeeded by: Colette Irwin-Knott (interim)

Personal details
- Spouse: Veronica
- Children: 4
- Occupations: professor, university president

Academic background
- Education: Elizabethtown College, Catholic University
- Alma mater: University of Colorado Denver (PhD)
- Thesis: Exploring a comprehensive model for leadership and adaptive organizational change: a case study of the Advisory Committee on Tenure-Related Processes at the University of Colorado (2011)

Academic work
- Institutions: Siena College; University of Colorado Denver; Valparaiso University

Mark A. Heckler is a former president of Valparaiso University. He was named the 18th president of the university on July 1, 2008, succeeding Alan Harre, and served until September 1, 2020, when he was named president emeritus.

== At Valparaiso University ==
During Heckler's tenure, Valparaiso University launched its Institute for Leadership and Service and created the Presidential Commission for an Inclusive Valparaiso Community (CIVIC). The university also launched academic programs in physician assistant studies, bioengineering, cyber security, music therapy and occupational therapy and opened six new campus facilities.

In September 2016, Valparaiso University publicly launched Forever Valpo: The Campaign for Our Future at a gala with more than 2,000 attendees. At the event, Heckler said the campaign had raised more than $135 million toward its $250 million goal and that priorities include support for unrestricted endowment funds, facilities, scholarships, faculty, and university programs.

In October 2016, Valparaiso University extended Heckler’s contract. Board of Directors chair Frederick Kraegel cited Heckler’s leadership in recent "enrollment growth, new program development, campus expansion, and the implementation of the most comprehensive and ambitious strategic plan in Valpo’s history."

Heckler joined the presidents of more than 20 private colleges and universities in Indiana to call on legislators to create a law addressing hate crimes in 2018. At the time, Indiana was one of five states without such a law.

In August 2019, Valparaiso University announced it would begin a search for the next president following Heckler's recommendation to the Board of Directors. Heckler transitioned to president emeritus, and Valparaiso University announced Colette Irwin-Knott became the interim president on September 1, 2020 and served until February 28, 2021.

== Career ==
Heckler was previously chief academic officer for the University of Colorado Denver. He first had been Director of the School of the Arts and a professor of theater at that University, then founding dean of its College of Arts and Media and professor of theater, film, and television, then acting chancellor, and finally, provost and vice chancellor for academic and student affairs, appointed to that role in 2003. He also was coordinator of their International College in Beijing, China from 1996 to 1998.

Prior to CU Denver, he had been at Siena College in Loudonville, New York as professor of fine arts and director of theater. While at Siena, Heckler directed, acted in, designed, and/or produced more than 100 academic and professional productions in the United States, Europe, and the Middle East.

Heckler graduated from Elizabethtown College in 1977 and grew up in Windber, Pennsylvania. He and his wife have four children and nine grandchildren.

His professional associations include the Leadership Commission of the American Council on Education (previous chair), the New American Colleges and Universities (previous board chair), the Independent Colleges of Indiana, Indiana Campus Compact, the One Region initiative for Northwest Indiana, the Council of Independent Colleges, and the national Private College 529 Plan.

He also served as president of the major professional association in his field, the Association for Theatre in Higher Education.

As of 2022, Heckler is listed as a senior consultant at AGB Consulting.

Academic offices
Preceded by Alan F. Harre	18th President of Valparaiso University; 2008–2020	Succeeded by Colette Irwin-Knott (Interim)
