= Diego Lasansky =

American painter (born 1994)

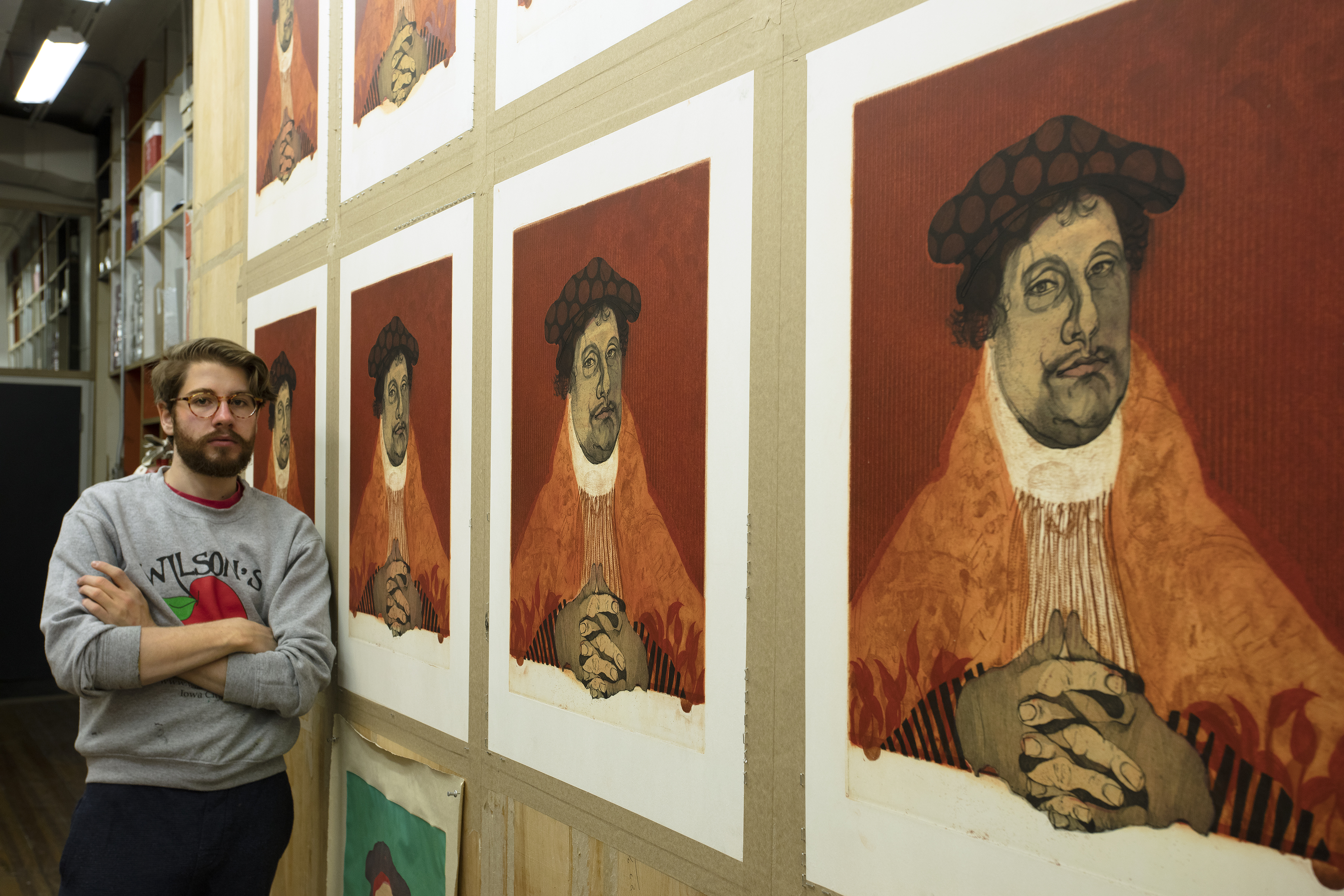
- Artist in his Iowa City studio
- Born: Diego Bolivar Lasansky; December 6, 1994 (age 31); Iowa City, Iowa U.S.
- Education: B.F.A. Distinction and Honors, University of Iowa
- Known for: Printmaking, drawing and painting
- Spouse: Katharine Marshall Lasansky (m. 2019)

Diego Lasansky (born December 6, 1994, Iowa City, Iowa) is an American artist whose focus is on printmaking, painting, and drawing. He lives in Iowa City, Iowa.

== Biography ==
Diego Lasansky is a painter and printmaker. Prior to his formal college education, Diego Lasansky learned about artistic processes not only from his grandfather, Mauricio Lasansky, but also from his uncles, three of whom are professional artists, William, Leonardo, and Tomas Lasansky. Lasansky's work is figurative, and, like his grandfather, tends to focus on subjects readily available to him—such as family members—and those of historical and personal significance. Early success came to Diego Lasansky in his series Portrait at Eighteen. This was a series of 50 intaglio self-portraits, all of which were distinguishable from the others. In 2015 the Cedar Rapids Museum of Art published a monograph on Lasansky.

One of his more recent portraits is of Martin Luther as Junker Jörg. This image of Martin Luther was created in the medium of intaglio printmaking and commemorates the 500th anniversary of the Reformation. This portrait considers the figurative and formal elements of a portrait of Martin Luther prior to him assuming the identity or persona of Junker Jörg as he went into hiding:

I am delighted to have Mr. Diego Lasansky's Junker Jörg 1521 (2015) to add to our holdings. It recalls the central role of the Arts in sixteenth century Reformation. From Albrecht Durer's promotion of the Luther's reforming insight through the medium of woodcut prints to Luther's own writings of hymns to teach the people through music, the arts were a vehicle for the Reformation movement. Mr. Lasansky's work represents the continuing contribution of arts to the semper reformanda reality of the Church, even as his image of Luther in 1521 commemorates a central movement in Reformation.

— Elizabeth Eaton, Presiding Bishop, Evangelical Lutheran Church in America (ELCA), July 5, 2016.

== Work ==
In 2014, Lasansky began work on an intaglio print depicting Martin Luther as Junker Jörg. The print depicts Luther as Junker Jörg (translated to Knight George), the persona he adopted during his stay at Wartburg Castle, where he translated the New Testament from Greek into German. In 2016, Lasansky gifted 40 original intaglio prints of Martin Luther to Wartburg College in celebration of the 500th anniversary of the Protestant Reformation. Each copy of Junker Jörg 1521 was created in Lasansky's studio over a six-month period. The intaglio printmaking process involves etching and engraving on a flat piece of copper:

I was honored by Diego’s gift, and I’m delighted to be in a position to share. Diego’s only request is that the receiving institutions find a home for this print in their permanent collection of art.

— Darrel D. Colson, Presiding of Wartburg College, Portrait of the Reformation, (Wartburg Magazine), November 22, 2016.

The church, for centuries, was the main supporter of the arts. For me, the interest in drawing the pope or someone like Martin Luther is no different than me drawing Albert Einstein or a president, he said. They are significant figures in time who have more than just a religious meaning.

— Diego Lasansky, Artist, Portrait of the Reformation, (Wartburg Magazine), November 22, 2016.

== Personal life ==
On January 18, 2020, Diego's father, Luis Phillip Lasansky, son of Mauricio Lasansky, died unexpectedly at the age of 65. Phillip was the director of the Lasansky Corporation for more than forty years.

== Selected collections ==
- Augsburg University, Minneapolis, Minnesota
- Augustana University, Sioux Falls, South Dakota
- Bisignano Art Gallery, University of Dubuque, Dubuque, Iowa
- Brauer Museum of Art, Valparaiso University, Valparaiso, Indiana
- Cedar Rapids Museum of Art, Cedar Rapids, Iowa
- China Printmaking Museum, Gulan, Longhua New District, Shenzhen, Guangdong, China
- College of Dentistry, University of Iowa, Iowa City, Iowa
- Concordia College New York, Bronxville, New York
- Concordia Gallery, Concordia University-Saint Paul, St. Paul, Minnesota
- Concordia Seminary St. Louis, Missouri
- Concordia University Ann Arbor, Ann Arbor, Michigan
- Concordia University of Edmonton, Lutheran Seminary, Edmonton, Alberta, Canada
- Concordia College Moorhead, Moorhead, Minnesota
- Concordia University Wisconsin, Mequon, Wisconsin
- Department of Art and Design, College of Humanities, Concordia University, St. Paul, Minnesota
- Dubuque Museum of Art, Dubuque, Iowa
- Evangelical Lutheran Church in America (ELCA), Churchwide Ministries, Chicago, Illinois
- Finlandia University Hancock, Michigan
- George R. White Library and Learning Center, Concordia University, Portland, Oregon
- Gettysburg College, Gettysburg, Pennsylvania
- Gloria Dei Lutheran Church, Iowa City, Iowa
- Grand View University, Des Moines, Iowa
- Gustavus Adolphus College, St. Peter, Minnesota
- Heritage Collection, Augustana Teaching Museum, Augustana College, Rock Island, Illinois
- John and Linda Friend Art Gallery, Concordia University Irvine, Irvine, California
- Joel and Lila Harnett Print Study Center University of Richmond Museum, Richmond, Virginia
- Kristin Wigley-Fleming Fine Arts Gallery, Luther College, Decorah, Iowa
- Lenoir–Rhyne University, Hickory, North Carolina
- Luther College University of Regina, Regina, Saskatchewan, Canada
- Luther Memorials Foundation of Saxony-Anhalt, The Saxony-Anhalt Museum Association, Wittenberg, Germany
- Lutheran School of Theology at Chicago, Chicago, Illinois
- Lutheran Theological Library, University of Saskatchewan, Saskatoon, Saskatchewan, Canada
- Lutheran Theological Seminary at Philadelphia, Philadelphia, Pennsylvania
- Lutheran Theological Seminary University of Saskatchewan, Saskatoon, Saskatchewan, Canada
- Marxhausen Art Gallery, Concordia University Nebraska, Seward, Nebraska
- Mingenback Art Gallery, Bethany College, Lindsborg, Kansas
- Newberry College Newberry, South Carolina
- Office of the General Secretary, Lutheran World Federation, Geneva, Switzerland
- Olin Hall Gallery, Roanoke College, Salem, Virginia
- Pacific Lutheran Theological Seminary, Berkeley, California
- Pacific Lutheran University, Tacoma, Washington
- Raclin Murphy Museum of Art, University of Notre Dame, Notre Dame, Indiana
- Springfield Museum of Art, Wittenberg University, Springfield, Ohio
- St. Paul's Lutheran Church & School, Waverly, Iowa
- Stiftung Lutherhaus, Lutherhaus Eisenach, Eisenach, Germany
- Susquehanna University, Selinsgrove, Pennsylvania
- Texas Lutheran University, Sequin, Texas
- Thiel College, Greenville, Pennsylvania
- United States Embassy in Latvia, Riga, Latvia
- University of Hawaii at Hilo, Hilo, Hawaii
- Waldorf University Foundation, Forest City, Iowa
- Wartburg College, Waverly, Iowa
- Wartburg Theological Seminary, Dubuque, Iowa
- William Rolland Gallery of Fine Art, California Lutheran University, Thousand Oaks, California
- Wisconsin Evangelical Lutheran Synod, Waukesha, Wisconsin
- Wisconsin Lutheran Seminary, Mequon, Wisconsin
- Worcester Art Museum, Worcester, Massachusetts
- Zion Lutheran Church, Iowa City, Iowa

== Bibliography ==
- Ulmer, Sean M. Diego Lasansky: Paintings, Drawings, Prints. Iowa City, IA: Cedar Rapids Museum of Art, (December 5, 2015). ISBN 978-0-692-58865-9
