= Mountain Landscape =

Painting by Frederic Edwin Church

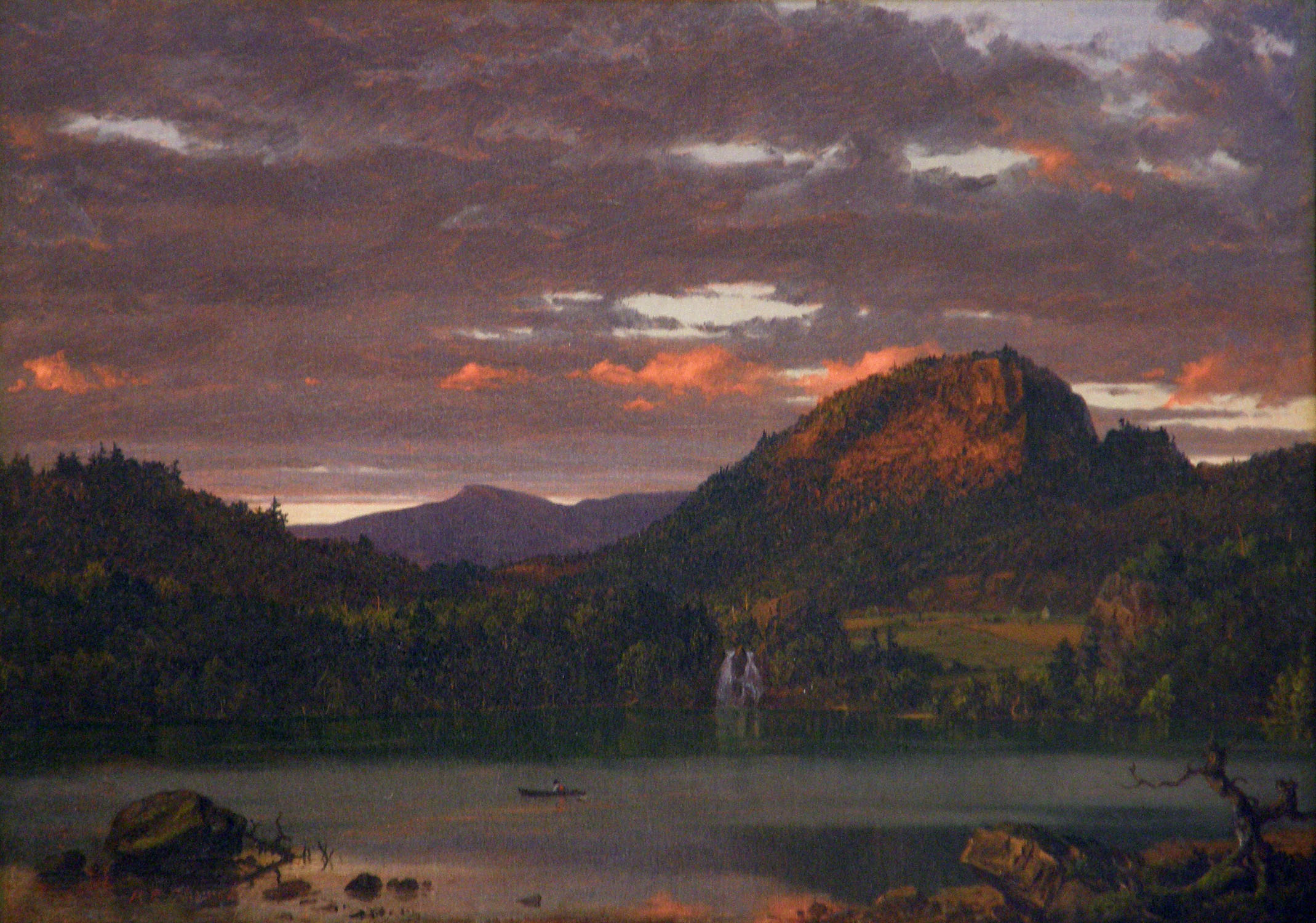
- Artist: Frederic Edwin Church
- Year: c. 1849
- Medium: oil paint, canvas
- Dimensions: 34.6 cm (13.6 in) × 48.5 cm (19.1 in)
- Location: Brauer Museum of Art
- Accession: 53.01.107

Mountain Landscape, previously known as Sunset—West Rock, New Haven, is an 1849 landscape painting by American artist Frederic Edwin Church of the Hudson River School, completed during his early period. The work depicts a mountain landscape with a lake and a small farm in the Northeastern United States based on Church's travels through the state of Vermont. The painting was originally part of the Nickerson art collection but was later donated to Valparaiso University as part of the Sloan bequest in 1953 and exhibited at the Brauer Museum of Art. In 2023, the university proposed selling the painting as an asset to fund dormitory renovations, leading to a contentious debate about the ethics of deaccessioning artwork.

== Description ==
The scene unfolds at twilight, with a blueish-white sky tinged with purples and grays, echoed by the surrounding clouds. The amber glow of the fading light of sunset bathes the mountain in the center-right of the composition. Wild forests envelop the scene, providing a counterpoint to the orderly farmlands visible in a clearing in the middleground—a rare glimpse of human presence. Nature's untamed expanse contrasts with the geometric patterns of cultivated land. A lake in the foreground reflects the scene with serene clarity, while a lone figure in a boat drifts near the shore, adding a contemplative dimension to the composition. A waterfall punctuates the landscape near the forest's edge, further animating the tranquil scene.

An image of the painting is difficult to fully capture with photography, particularly in the attempt to duplicate the intensity of the reflected orange and red sunset light which sparkles with scumbled paint. "The painting seems to exude a rosy light that reaches out to the viewer as [one] bends forward to examine the surface", writes Gregg Hertzlieb, the former Brauer Museum director and curator. "The orange and rose light does appear in photographic reproduction but does not seem to have the depth, the complexity that one sees in the actual piece."

== Background ==
Church was raised in Hartford, Connecticut, where he remained from 1826 to 1843. He moved to Catskill, New York, in 1844, to study art for two years under Thomas Cole, the founder of the Hudson River School. Cole preferred the style of creating compositions of both representational and imaginative landscapes, where the artist creates a fusion of what is both in the natural world and in the mind on the canvas. During this time, Church made sketches in Long Island and completed a painting in Catskill (The Catskill Creek, 1845). He first exhibited two works, Twilight among the Mountains and Hudson Scenery at the National Academy of Design in 1845.

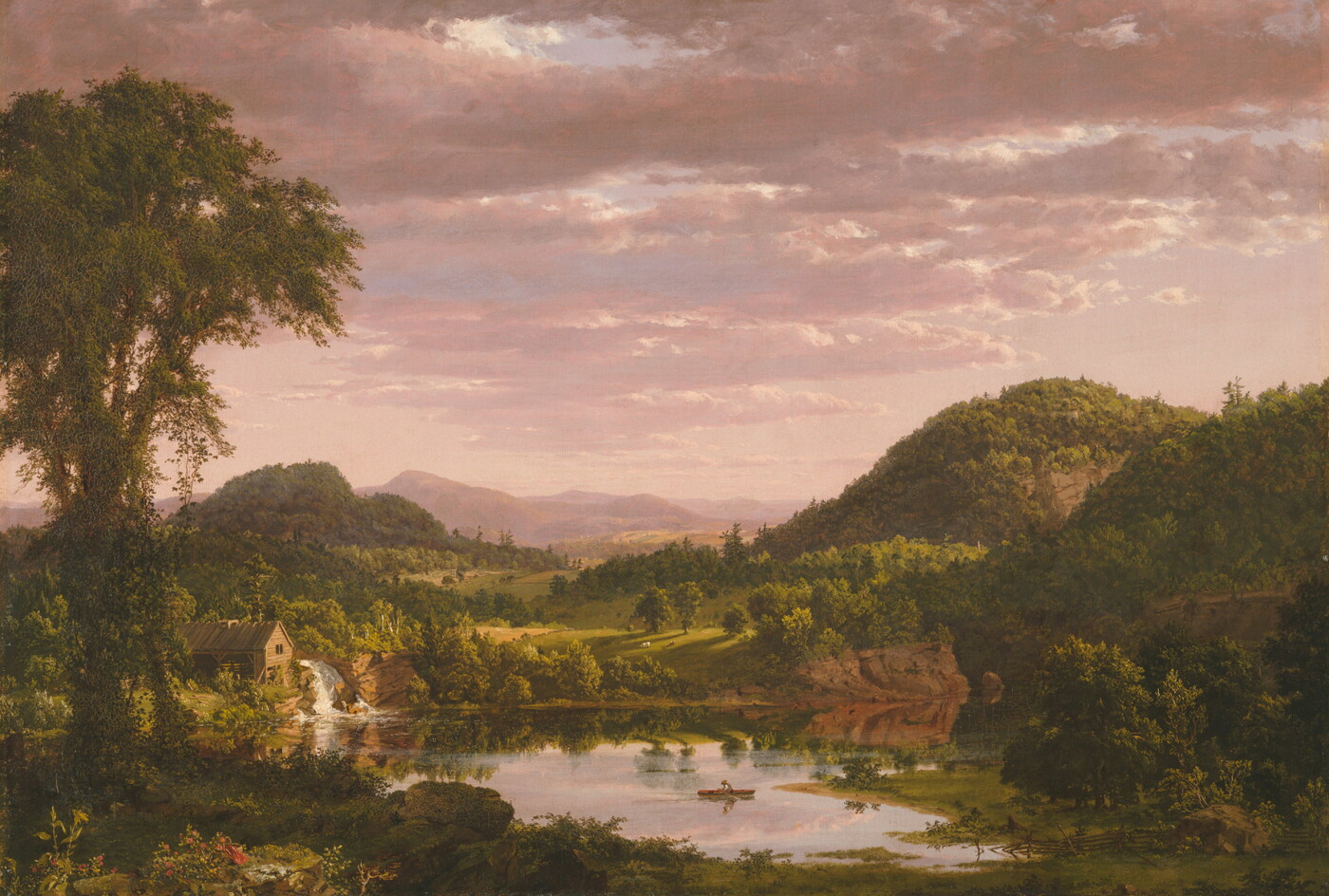
New England Landscape (c. 1849)

Church sketched throughout southern Vermont in 1849, completing more than ten paintings that year, including A Mountain Tempest, The Plague of Darkness, West Rock, New Haven, Above the Clouds at Sunrise, View in Pittsford, Vermont, New England Landscape (Evening after a Storm), The Harp of the Winds (A Passing Storm), Morning, Sunset, and Lower Falls, Rochester, as only a small selection. Mountain Landscape is believed to have been created back in the studio sometime between 1849 and 1850 based on Church's memories of his time in Vermont. It was alternatively titled Sunset—West Rock, New Haven, as it was thought to depict West Rock, New Haven, an idea which was later discounted. At least one similar, but slightly different variant from the same time and scene, New England Landscape (c. 1849), is held by the Amon Carter Museum.

== Provenance ==
Originally owned by banker Samuel M. Nickerson (1830–1914), president of the First National Bank of Chicago and a prominent 19th-century art collector, the painting was part of his extensive art collection, which he donated to the Art Institute of Chicago in 1900. In 1950, Percy Sloan, son of the Hudson River School artist Junius R. Sloan, acquired Mountain Landscape from the Art Institute and donated it to Valparaiso University as part of a larger bequest of 400 works. In 2023, Mountain Landscape became the subject of a controversial proposal. Valparaiso University, facing financial pressures amidst declining enrollment and a deficit, announced plans to sell the painting as part of an effort to fund dormitory renovations to attract new students. This decision ignited a heated debate over the ethics of deaccessioning—a process governed by ethical museum guidelines that typically mandate reinvesting the proceeds of artwork sales back into the museum's collection. Instead, the proposed sale aimed to direct funds toward non-art-related expenditures, provoking strong opposition from faculty, students, and the wider art community.

== Related work ==
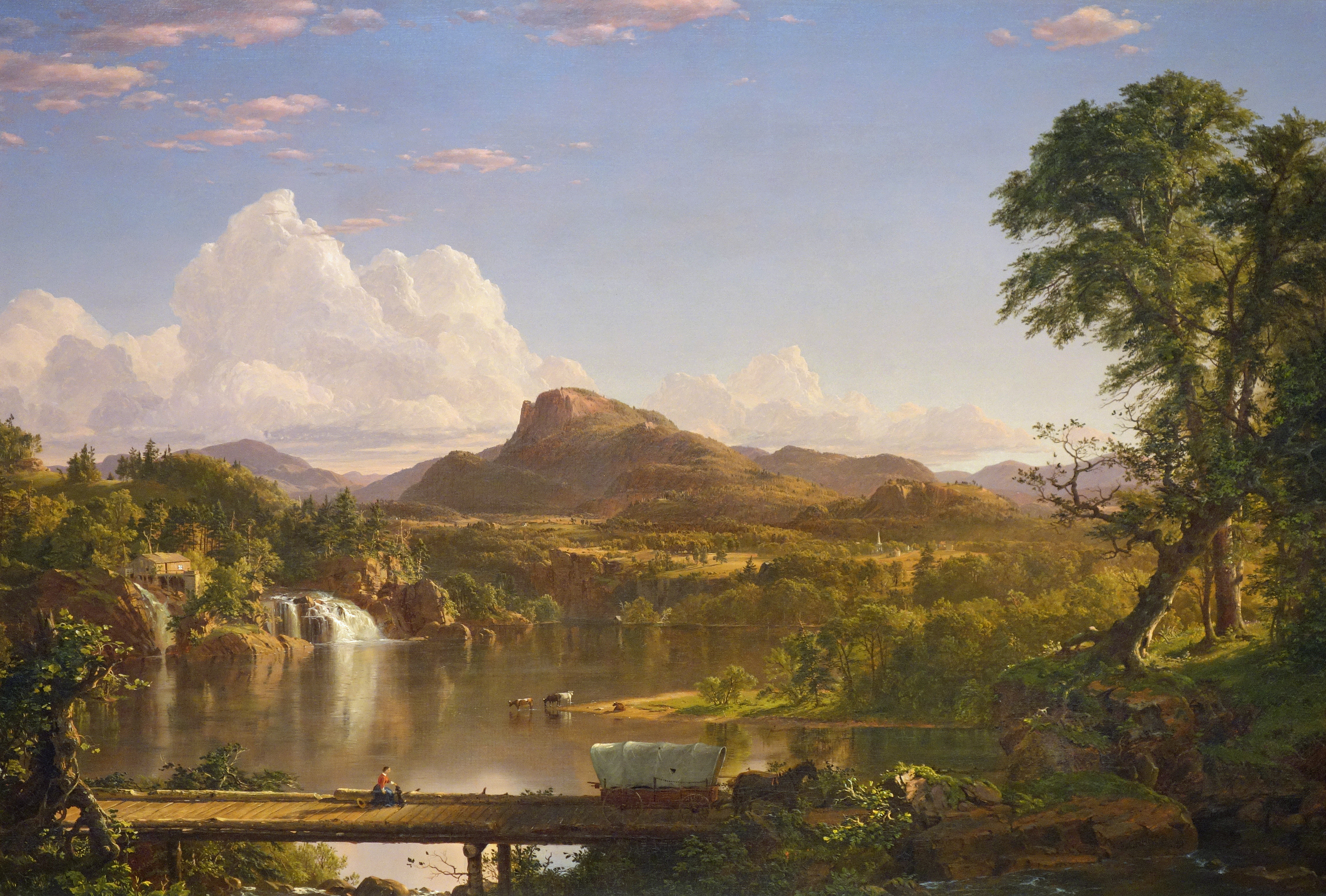
New England Scenery (1851)

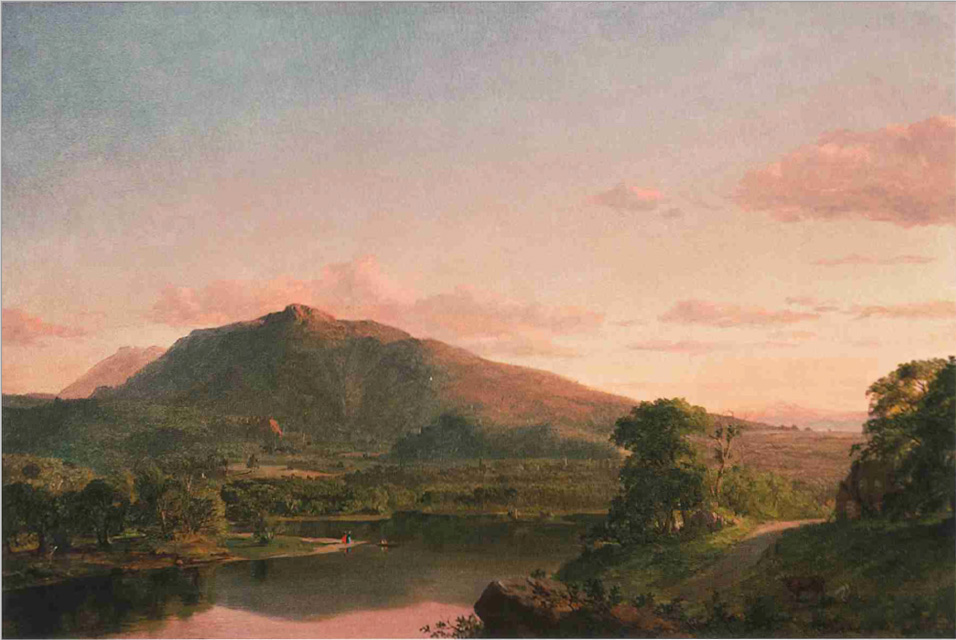
Vermont Scenery (1852)

== See also ==
- List of paintings by Frederic Edwin Church
