= Brian E. Konkol =

American academic administrator

The Reverend Brian E. Konkol

20th President of Valparaiso University
- Incumbent
- Assumed office January 1, 2026
- Preceded by: José D. Padilla

Personal details
- Born: Amherst Junction, Wisconsin, United States of America
- Spouse(s): Kristen Tews Konkol, Ph.D.
- Children: 2
- Education: Viterbo University (1997–2001) (B.S.); Luther Seminary (2001–2005) (M.Div.); University of KwaZulu-Natal (2009–2016) (M.Th., Ph.D.)

Brian E. Konkol is the 20th President of Valparaiso University. Konkol was most recently Vice President and Dean of Hendricks Chapel at Syracuse University. Konkol is an ordained minister of the Evangelical Lutheran Church in America (ELCA).

Reverend Konkol is renowned for his affinity for wearing bowties. The Chicago Tribune compared his prominent bowtie usage to former Valparaiso, Indiana resident Orville Redenbacher. For Konkol's inauguration, a bowtie-shaped wood carving was commissioned, displayed at the Harre Union.

== Early life and education ==
Reverend Konkol was born to George and Judy Konkol in Amherst Junction, Wisconsin. Konkol graduated from Amherst High School in 1997.

Konkol has a Bachelor of Science degree in Criminal Justice and Psychology from Viterbo University, a Master of Divinity degree with a focus in Theology and Ministerial Studies from Luther Seminary, and both a Master of Theology degree and a Doctorate of Philosophy degree in Theology and Development from the School of Religion, Philosophy, and Classics at the University of KwaZulu-Natal.

== Career ==
Reverend Konkol was ordained with the Evangelical Lutheran Church in America (ELCA) in 2005.

From 2008 to 2012, Konkol served in South Africa with the ELCA's Young Adults in Global Mission program and lecturing at the now-defunct Lutheran Theological Institute in Pietermaritzburg, KwaZulu-Natal. While at the Institute, he participated as a member of the World Council of Churches and Lutheran World Federation in the Conference of the Parties to the United Nations Framework Convention on Climate Change.

Konkol served as Vice President and Dean of Hendricks Chapel at Syracuse University from 2017 to 2025. During Konkol's tenure at Syracuse University, he oversaw a five-year strategic plan which increased student participation in Hendricks Chapel by 933%, expanded over 2,000 annual programs, and increased annual donor engagement.

Konkol was announced as President of Valparaiso University in December 2025, succeeding José D. Padilla. Konkol assumed the position on January 1, 2026, and was formally inaugurated on September 25, 2026.

Reverend Konkol was a frequent contributor to and featured writer for The Huffington Post from 2016 to 2018 and Sojourners from 2012 to 2016 with a focus on social justice.

Academic offices
Preceded by José D. Padilla	20th President of Valparaiso University	Incumbent
