= Colette Irwin-Knott =

American academic administrator (born 1959)

Interim President of Valparaiso University
- In office September 1, 2020 – February 28, 2021
- Preceded by: Mark A. Heckler
- Succeeded by: José D. Padilla

Member of the Valparaiso University Board of Directors
- Incumbent
- Assumed office 2009

Personal details
- Born: September 1959 (age 67)
- Spouse: Gary Knott
- Children: 2
- Education: Valparaiso University

Colette Irwin-Knott is an American academic administrator. She served as the interim president of Valparaiso University from September 1, 2020, to February 28, 2021. Irwin-Knott has served on the Valparaiso University Board of Directors since 2009.

== Biography ==
Irwin-Knott graduated from Valparaiso University in 1981 with a bachelor of science degree. She worked in public finance in Indianapolis, Indiana, until her retirement in 2014.

Academic offices
Preceded by Mark A. Heckler	Interim President of Valparaiso University; 2020–2021	Succeeded by José D. Padilla
