= Association of Art Museum Curators =

The Association of Art Museum Curators (AAMC) was founded in New York in 2001 to support the role of curators in shaping the mission of art museums in North America.

== History ==
The Peabody Essex Museum in Salem, Massachusetts was founded in 1799, the Yale University Art Gallery in 1832, the Wadsworth Atheneum in 1842, and the Metropolitan Museum of Art in 1870. After nearly two centuries of curatorial practice in North America, the AAMC has been established as North America's first professional organization for art museum curators active in all fields of scholarly pursuit.

The AAMC, a 501(c)(6) membership organization, grew out of the Forum of Curators and Conservators at the Metropolitan Museum of Art, a recognized, non-union body of more than 100 members. In response to news of staff reorganizations at several major US museums, members of the Forum created an ad hoc committee to explore the feasibility of a national organization of museum curators in 1999. Over the course of two and a half years, curators at the Metropolitan Museum - including Katharine Baetje Stefano Carboni, Colta Ives, Peter Kenny and Gary Tinterow - drafted the mission statement and by-laws of the proposed organization. In April 2001, they held a meeting in New York, attended by representatives from a dozen American art museums, during which they voted the organization into existence.

At the same time, members of the Forum's ad hoc committee worked closely with prominent members of the Association of Art Museum Directors (AAMD), including Philippe de Montebello, Anne d'Harnoncourt, Katharine Lee Reid, and James N. Wood. Earlier, in autumn 2000, the Presidents Council held a formal discussion with senior curators regarding the establishment of the AAMC, the first time that curators were invited to speak to this committee. In Spring 2001, Mr. de Montebello announced the formation of the AAMC in his keynote address at a colloquium sponsored by the American Federation of Arts, and in July of that year, James Cuno, then president of the AAMD, wrote an official letter of endorsement. In June 2002, more than 300 curators from across the United States attended the first AAMC convention held at the Metropolitan Museum of Art.

The AAMC has held an annual meeting in each subsequent year and continues to build membership and programs. In 2006, the AAMC had a board of 18 trustees from 14 museums who comprise some of the most distinguished figures in the field; more than 500 members in the United States and Canada; and a paid administrator working in offices in New York City generously provided by the Samuel H. Kress Foundation.

In early 2004, the AAMC board of trustees voted to incorporate the AAMC Foundation, a 501(c)(3) tax-exempt organization.

== Mission and goals ==
The Foundation's seeks to heighten public understanding of the curator's role through lectures, symposia, and published materials. It also awards grants to curators in order improve their ability to serve the public.

The goals of the AAMC are to:

- Serve as an advocacy group for the curatorial profession
- Articulate the standards for the profession
- Promote research and scholarship through an annual meeting and educational programs on selected themes held at venues throughout North America
- Exchange information through a website and monthly newsletter
- Facilitate online discussions addressing a wide variety of relevant topics
- Recognize distinguished achievement in the field through annual awards
- Facilitate the exchange of information about traveling exhibitions
- Provide a collegial forum for discussion about museum issues in North America
- Accomplish these goals in cooperation with museum directors, trustees and other staff

== Programs ==
The AAMC and AAMC Foundation sponsor several programs each year:

- the members' annual meeting, held each May
- regional professional development conferences and/or receptions
- mentoring initiatives for junior curators
- grants for travel and professional development (and, when warranted, emergency grants)
- annual prizes for outstanding book, article, and exhibition
