= Tomas Lasansky =

American artist (born 1957)

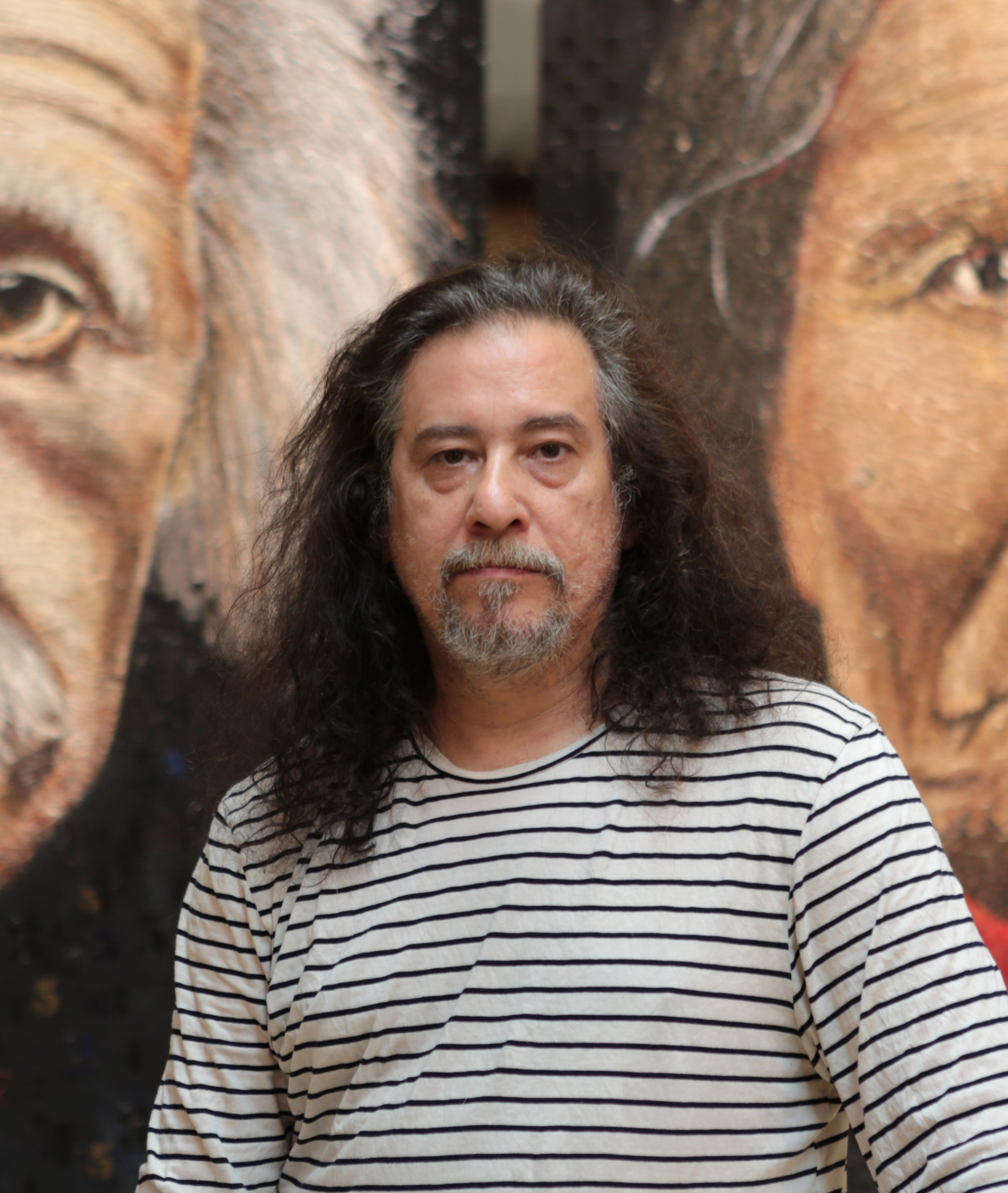
- Born: Tomás Lasansky; 1957; Iowa City, Iowa
- Education: University of Iowa
- Known for: Printmaking, drawing, painting

Tomás Lasansky (born 1957) is an American artist. He lives in Iowa City, Iowa. His work relates to the Native American culture of the south-western United States. He is the son of Mauricio Lasansky.

Lasansky learned the standard techniques of printmaking – hard- and soft-ground etching, engraving, aquatint, scraping and burnishing – from his father, and in the early 1970s began working as his printing assistant.
