= Brauer Museum of Art =

Coordinates: 41.4640°N 87.0401°W

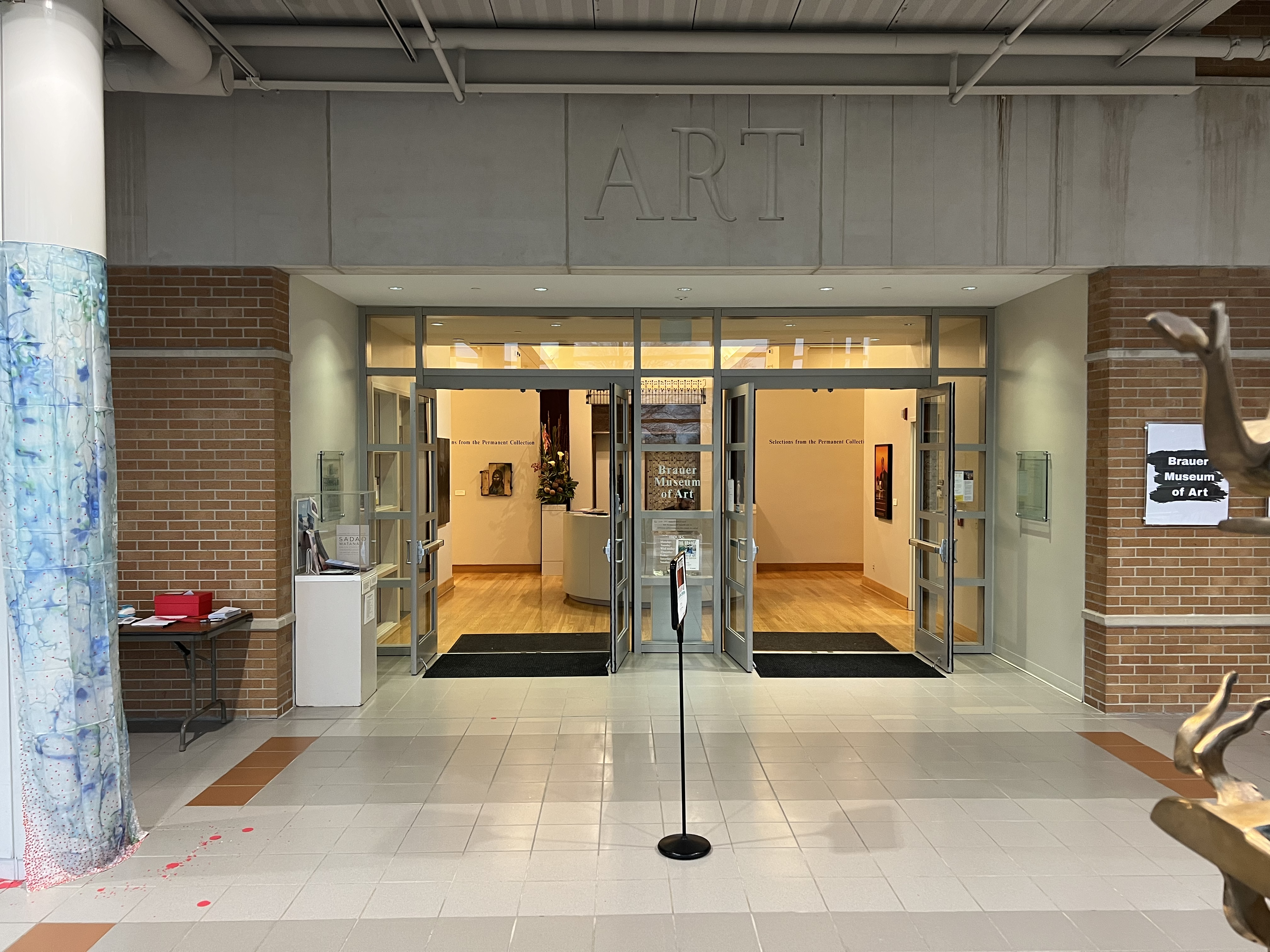
- The entrance to the Brauer Museum of Art within Valparaiso University’s Center for the Arts
- Established: 1996
- Location: Valparaiso University Center for the Arts, Valparaiso, Indiana, United States
- Type: Art museum
- Key holdings: Largest collection of works by painter Junius R. Sloan
- Collections: 19th- and 20th-century American art, world religious art, and Midwestern regional art
- Collection size: 2700
- Owner: Valparaiso University
- Website: www.valpo.edu/artmuseum

The Brauer Museum of Art is an art museum at Valparaiso University, a private university in Valparaiso, Indiana. It is home to a collection of 19th- and 20th-century American art, world religious art, and Midwestern regional art. It is located in the Valparaiso University Center for the Arts (VUCA). Prior to the museum's opening, the university's collection was housed and displayed within several buildings across campus. It was named the Brauer Museum of Art in 1996 to honor the collection's long-time director and curator, Richard H. W. Brauer. The university began to explore selling parts of its art collection in 2023, to significant controversy and adverse legal action, and closed the museum in the summer of 2024. The museum reopened in November 2024.

== History ==
In February 2023, The Brauer came under fire for plans to sell three major works from its collection—Mountain Landscape by Frederic Edwin Church, The Silver Veil and the Golden Gate by Childe Hassam, and Rust Red Hills by Georgia O'Keeffe—to fund improvements to a Valparaiso University dormitory. The university closed the museum entirely and fired its director in the summer of 2024.

The museum reopened with increased security in November 2024. The former director was made the museum's curator.

== Collection ==
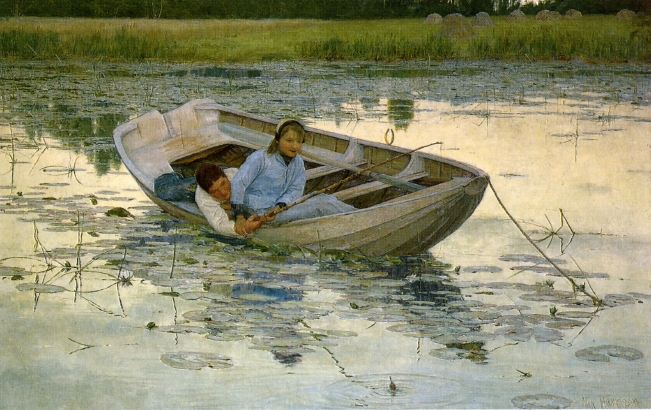
Les Amateurs (1882–83), T. Alexander Harrison

The collection of the museum includes landscape paintings by Frederic Edwin Church, Asher B. Durand, John F. Kensett and the largest known collection of works by painter Junius R. Sloan. Large late 19th-century paintings by T. Alexander Harrison and Elizabeth Nourse; Impressionist paintings by Karl Anderson, Childe Hassam and Robert Reid, and urban realist paintings by William Glackens and John Sloan also comprise some of the Brauer Museum's permanent collection of over 2,700 pieces.

The Brauer Museum of Art holds 150 photographs and seven silkscreen prints by Andy Warhol, including an iconic soup can painting.

The museum also holds early modernist paintings by John Marin, Walt Kuhn and Georgia O'Keeffe. Other contemporary works include artists such as Elaine de Kooning, Ed Paschke, Chuck Close, Diego Lasansky, Dale Chihuly, Frank Dudley John Himmelfarb, and Ansel Adams.

The Brauer Museum frequently hosts special exhibitions and events. Such events feature the works of such artists as Ansel Adams and Salvador Dalí.
