= Deaccessioning =

Permanent removal of an object from a museum's collection

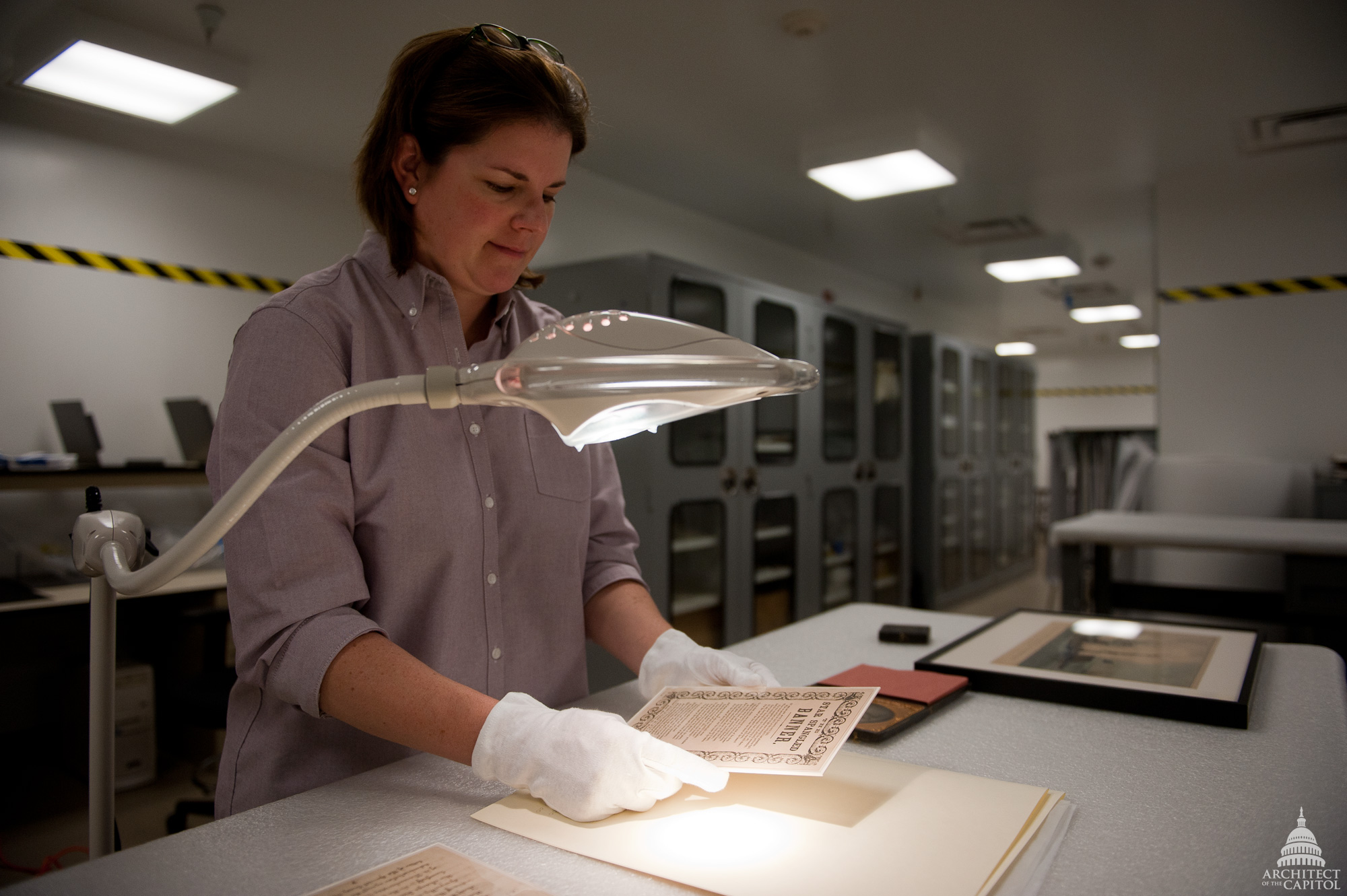
A museum registrar examines an artifact.

Deaccessioning is the process by which a work of art or other object is permanently removed from a museum's collection to sell it or otherwise dispose of it.

== Deaccession policy ==
The process undertaken by a museum to deaccession a work involves several steps that are usually laid out in a museum's collection management policy. The terms under which an object may be considered for removal, as well as the individuals with the authority to approve the process are outlined in the deaccession section of this article. Additionally, this section lays out the legal restrictions and ethical considerations associated with removal of the object and the types of disposal that are appropriate based on the reason for the deaccession.

== Decision process ==
Each museum establishes its own method and workflow for the deaccession process according to its organizational structure. However all object deaccessioning involves the two processing steps of deaccession and disposal.

The process begins with the curator creating a document called a "statement of justification", which outlines their decision criteria and reasoning for presenting the work as a possible deaccession. To determine if a work should be deaccessioned from a museum's collection, a curator or registrar completes and documents a series of justification steps and then present their findings to the museum director and governing board for final approval.

=== Deaccession criteria ===
There are a number of reasons why deaccessioning might be considered. The following is a typical list of criteria for deaccession and disposal:

- The work is no longer consistent with the mission or collecting goals of the museum.
- The work is of poor quality and lacks value for exhibition or study purposes.
- The physical condition of the work is so poor that restoration is not practicable or would compromise the work's integrity or the artist's intent. Works damaged beyond reasonable repair that are not of use for study or teaching purposes may be destroyed.
- The museum is unable to care adequately for the work because of the work's particular requirements for storage or display or its continuing need for special treatment for proper and long term conservation.
- The work is being sold as part of the museum's effort to refine and improve its collections, in keeping with the collecting goals reviewed and approved by the museum's board of trustees or governing body.
- The authenticity or attribution of the work is determined to be false or fraudulent and the object lacks sufficient aesthetic merit or art historical importance to warrant retention.
- The work is a duplicate that has no value as part of a series.
- The work may have been stolen or illegally imported in violation of applicable laws of the jurisdiction in which the museum is located, such as the Native American Graves Protection and Repatriation Act in the United States; or the work may be subject to other legal claims, such as with works misappropriated under Nazi rule.

=== Deaccession justification steps ===
The typical steps that need to be taken to justify the deaccession and disposal of the work include:

- Verification of legal status: Staff verifies that the museum possesses official legal title of the work and check their records in order to ascertain if there are any restrictions that exist in the original gift, bequest, or purchase which may hinder or limit disposal options, including transfer of copyright or trademark.
  - The need to establish clear and unrestricted title is important because it ensures the museum can dispose of the work the via legal sale without risk of improper title transfer. See tangible personal property.
  - Donor restrictions are also uncovered at this stage of the process. Some donor restrictions determined at the gifting or bequest of the work or works may hinder the deaccession and/or the disposal process.
    - For example, the museum is looking to deaccession one piece of a set that was gifted and the donor's "deed of gift or bequest" included a request that the set remain together. In this case, the museum might need to seek legal counsel and take the documents to a judge to gain release from the deed of gift or bequest restrictions.
  - In the process of determining clear title, provenance research should ideally be conducted, especially if the deaccession process was instigated by a claim of illicit title, such as in the case of a Nazi looted work or stolen work of antiquity.
    - See UNESCO Convention on the Means of Prohibiting and Preventing the Illicit Import, Export and Transfer of Ownership of Cultural Property and AAM statement on the "Standards Regarding the Unlawful Appropriation of Objects During the Nazi Era"
- Physical examination: A conservator conducts an assessment of the work to determine its current condition, future maintenance needs, and viable disposal options, such as possible sale or destruction.
- Object evaluation: Acquiring through one or more appraisers reasonable evaluations of the work would be helpful especially if the work is to be disposed of via sale, auction, transfer or exchange for value in kind with another institution.
- Director and/or governing board approval: Following an internal review by all relevant staff, all documentation is presented to the governing board and/or the CEO/museum director for final approval. The workflow and final decision on deaccession is subject to the collection policies workflow and charters for each museum.
- Notification of donor and/or external stakeholders: Once the governing board and/or the CEO/museum director approves the deaccession the last step before beginning disposal is the notification of donor and external stakeholders of the deaccession. Although the museum holds clear title of the work and is not obliged by law to contact the donor of intent to deaccession, many museums contact donors or relatives out of courtesy. Museums may also confer with local community advisory groups, such as museum members, local collectors, other local museums, and volunteers about the deaccession to inform and gain community perspective on the work and its value to the collection.

=== Disposal ===
Disposal is defined as the transfer of ownership by the museum after a work has been deaccessioned. Following approval of deaccession from the governing board and/or the CEO/museum director, the work is disposed of and the title of ownership is completely transferred away from the museum or terminated. The method chosen is determined by the physical condition of the work, the intrinsic value or cultural value of the work and extrinsic value or monetary value of the work. With all methods of disposal, museums are charged to maintain and retain all records of the object, its deaccession and disposal.

The process of disposal is completed through the following methods:

- Donation of the object to another museum, library, or archive for educational purposes
  - This is the ideal disposal choice for museums as it assures that the object will remain accessible to the public. Museums seek out possible institutions where the object might a useful addition to the collection or is better equipped to maintain the object.
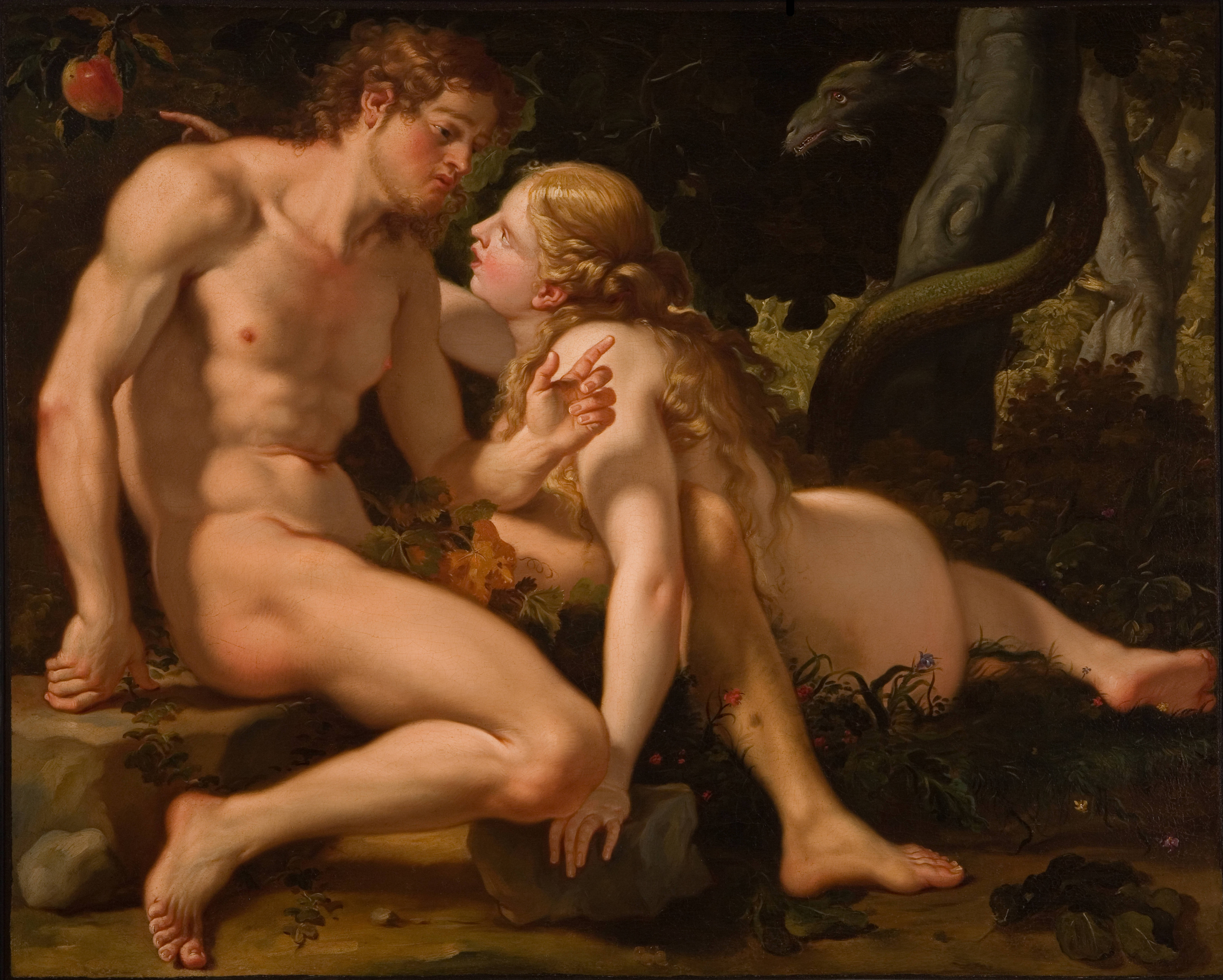
    Antonio Molinari – Adam and Eve, an example of a deaccessioned work: Deaccessioned in 1988 from Pennsylvania Academy of the Fine Arts, Philadelphia, Pennsylvania, and purchased by Ball State University Museum of Art, Muncie, Indiana, from Pennsylvania Academy of the Fine Arts in 1989
- Exchange of the object for another object with another museum or non-profit institution
  - This is another viable method for assuring that the object remains accessible to the public in some way. Exchanges are made in such a way that there is relatively equal value of the items involved, not just monetarily but historically.
    - Museum should be able to justify the trade, including any exceptional circumstances that would favor one party over another. This is why obtaining an appraisal of the object from more than one appraiser is a mandatory step in the deaccession process. See object evaluation above.
- Educational and research programs
  - Often works deaccession from the collection can be reallocated into educational programs, to be used for hands-on demonstrations, school outreach programs, or testing for conservation research. In this case it is understood that the work will be subject to physical destruction over time. In this case, the work would be re-accessioned into a study or educational collection that is not as closely monitored as that of the main collection.
- Physical destruction
  - Objects that may have deteriorated due to an inherent vice, natural disaster, vandalism, accident, or other causes as well as works that made be considered hazardous, such as those containing drugs, chemicals, explosives, or asbestos should be disposed of via physical destruction. If dealing with hazardous materials, the proper authorities should be consulted to determine the best method of destruction. The method of destruction will depend on the type of material and completed in such a ways as to be irreversible. This is also the best method for works that are found to be fakes or forgeries. See physical examination above.
  - Human remains or certain items of religious or cultural sensitivity might need to be handled in a prescribed way to meet legal requirements or cultural standards. See NAGPRA from more information.
- Repatriation.
  - Repatriation is the process of returning an object to their place of origin or proper owner. This is method of disposal is used for objects found to be illicitly held by the museum, such as Nazi looted art and objects requested for return according to NAGPRA. The illicit status of an object would be determined upon claim of repatriation via NAGPRA or claim by proper owner, in the case of Nazi looted or other stolen works. In either case, clear title and provenance would be determined during the step in which the legal status is verificated. See verification of legal status above.
- Return to donor.
  - Similar to the process of repatriation, if the work was donated to the museum and the donor or legal heir can be located at time of deaccession processing, the museum may elect to return the object to the donor. This is not the best option for museums for a few reasons. First, it removes the work from public accessibility and second, it can cause tax complications, as a deduction can be given for a portion of the work's value upon donation and the return of the work to the donor may result in an audit or at least IRS claim on the deduction value previously received.
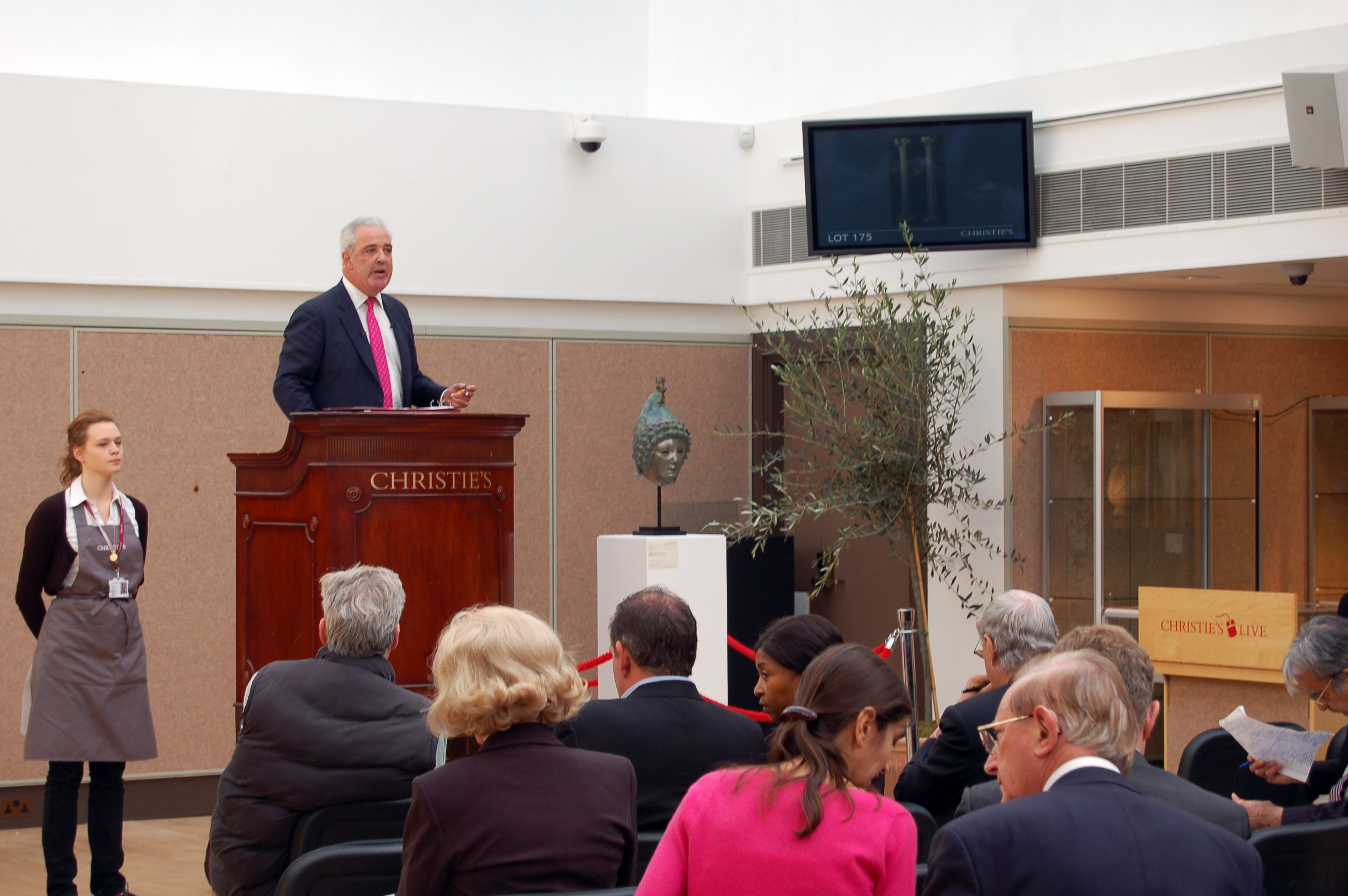
    An auction at Christie's
- Private sale and public auction.
  - Another method of disposal that is not the best option for museums. Museums hold collections in the public trust for public access. Though the best manner in which to generate funds from disposal for future accessions and care of current collection, disposal of works via sale or auction takes the work away from public access and places it into the hands of private citizens.

== Deaccession and museum ethics ==
Several professional museum associations have drafted codes of ethics governing the practice of deaccession. Two majors areas of ethical concern that are common in these codes of ethics are the prohibition of sale or transfer of collection items to museum trustees, staff, board members, or their relatives and the need to restrict the use of proceeds from any works disposed of via sale or auction.

The first of these ethical concerns is rather straightforward. The second has become a point of contention in recent years since museums and cities, like Detroit, have been struggling with financial shortfalls.

According to the Association of Art Museum Directors: "Funds received from the disposal of a deaccessioned work shall not be used for operations or capital expenses. Such funds, including any earnings and appreciation thereon, may be used only for the acquisition of works in a manner consistent with the museum's policy on the use of restricted acquisition funds." This stipulation was relaxed in April 2020 due to the COVID-19 pandemic and its negative impact on museum revenues, permitting some degree of deaccession through 2022 to "support the direct care of the museum's collection".

According to the American Association of Museums: "Proceeds from the sale of nonliving collections are to be used consistent with the established standards of the museum's discipline, but in no event shall they be used for anything other than acquisition or direct care of collections."

According to the AASLH (the American Association for State and Local History): "Collections shall not be deaccessioned or disposed of in order to provide financial support for institutional operations, facilities maintenance, or any reason other than the preservation or acquisition of collections."

According to the International Council of Museums: Proceeds should be applied solely to the purchase of additions to museum collections.

These associations have each determined to their own degree that all proceeds from sale or auction should be restricted to the future acquisition of collection objects and/ or to the ongoing maintenance of current collection holdings. Their decision and perspective on the practice of deaccession reflects a long-term view of museum collections as items held in public trust and preserved for access, appreciation, education, and enjoyment of not only today's public but the future public. See public trust doctrine.

An example of a recent controversy over deaccessioning was Northampton Museum and Art Gallery's sale of its ancient Egyptian statue of Sekhemka to an unnamed buyer despite protests from local residents and the Egyptian government. In 2014, Arts Council England deleted the museum from its accredited list.

== Views on deaccessioning ==
Deaccessioning is a controversial topic and activity, with diverging opinions from artists, arts professionals and the general public. Some commentators, such as Donn Zaretsky of The Art Law Blog, critique the notion of "the public trust" and argue that deaccessioning rules should probably be thrown out altogether. Others, such as Susan Taylor, director of the New Orleans Museum of Art and the AAMD's current president, believes that proceeds from the sale or funds from the deaccession can only be used to buy other works of art.

== Deaccessioning and lawsuits ==
In 2017, the children of Norman Rockwell sued the Berkshire Museum in an attempt to block the deaccessioning of their father's artworks. In 2023 the heirs of Hedwig Stern filed a lawsuit concerning Vincent Van Gogh's Olive Pickers which was deaccessioned and sold to the Basil & Elise Goulandris Foundation in Athens without a complete provenance. Also in 2023 a court in Indiana dismissed a lawsuit challenging the proposed sale of three works of art by Valparaiso University.
