= Association of Art Museum Directors =

The Association of Art Museum Directors (AAMD) is an organization of art museum directors from the United States, Canada, and Mexico.

The AAMD was established in 1916 by the directors of twelve American museums and was formally incorporated in 1969. It currently has 220 members.

The Association of Art Museum Directors aims "to support its members in increasing the contribution of art museums to society" by promoting professional standards of practice, facilitating education, and advocating for museums.

AAMD's policies and guidelines are developed by its members and it issues publications that prescribe professional practices, from accessioning and deaccessioning, to ethics and censorship.

== See also ==
- List of female art museum directors
- List of museums
