= 2025–26 Green Bay Phoenix women's basketball team =

American college basketball season

2025–26 Green Bay Phoenix women's basketball

Horizon League regular season and tournament champions

NCAA tournament, First Round
- Conference: Horizon League
- Record: 25–9 (17–3 Horizon)
- Head coach: Kayla Karius (2nd season)
- Assistant coaches: Kate Peterson Abiad; Sarah Bronk; Patrick Bowlin; Shay Frederick; Jasmine Kondrakiewicz
- Home arena: Kress Events Center

2025–26 Horizon League women's basketball standings
	Conf.				Overall
Team	W		L	PCT	W		L	PCT
Green Bay †	17	–	3	.850	25	–	9	.735
Youngstown State	15	–	5	.750	25	–	10	.714
Cleveland State	13	–	7	.650	26	–	10	.722
Northern Kentucky	12	–	8	.600	15	–	17	.469
Purdue Fort Wayne	12	–	8	.600	21	–	14	.600
Robert Morris	11	–	9	.550	18	–	12	.600
IU Indy	9	–	11	.450	14	–	17	.452
Oakland	7	–	13	.350	10	–	21	.323
Wright State	6	–	14	.300	10	–	22	.313
Milwaukee	4	–	16	.200	8	–	24	.250
Detroit Mercy	4	–	16	.200	7	–	24	.226
† 2026 Horizon League tournament winner

The 2025–26 Green Bay Phoenix women's basketball team represented the University of Wisconsin–Green Bay during the 2025–26 NCAA Division I women's basketball season. The Phoenix, led by second-year head coach Kayla Karius, played their home games at the Kress Events Center in Green Bay, Wisconsin as members of the Horizon League.

== Previous season ==
The Phoenix finished the 2024–25 season 29–6, 19–1 in Horizon League play, winning the conference's regular season title. Seniors Natalie McNeal and Maddy Schreiber earned first team All-Conference honors, whereas forward Jasmine Kondrakiewicz was tabbed to the All-Defensive team with guard Bailey Butler awarded conference defensive player of the year.

En route to winning the Horizon League tournament championship, they defeated Oakland, Robert Morris, and two-seed Purdue Fort Wayne, all a part of a 22-game winning steak and earning conference's automatic bid to the NCAA tournament, their second consecutive appearance and the first for head coach Kayla Karius.

They received the #12 seed in the Birmingham Regional 2, where they would fall to #5 seed Alabama in the first round.

== Offseason ==
=== Departures ===
Departures
Name	Num.	Pos.	Height	Year	Hometown	Reason for departure
Cassie Schiltz	1	G	5'11"	Senior	Luxemburg, Wisconsin	Graduated
Miah Meyer	3	G	5'8"	Senior	Silver Lake, Minnesota	Graduated
Natalie McNeal	11	G	5'8"	Senior	Germantown, Wisconsin	Graduated
Callie Genke	12	G	6'0"	Senior	Wrightstown, Wisconsin	Graduated
Jasmine Kondrakiewicz	21	F	6'1"	Senior	Milwaukee, Wisconsin	Graduated
Bailey Butler	22	G	5'7"	Senior	Black Hawk, Wisconsin	Graduated
Maddy Schreiber	34	G/F	6'0"	Senior	Appleton, Wisconsin	Graduated

=== Incoming transfers ===
Green Bay incoming transfers
Name	Number	Pos.	Height	Year	Hometown	Previous school
Carley Duffney	20	G	5'10"	RS Senior	Green Bay, WI	South Dakota
Gracie Grzesk	22	F	5'11"	Sophomore	Green Bay, WI	Wisconsin
Maddy Skorupski	3	G	5'8"	Senior	Clarkston, MI	Oakland
Lily Hansford	2	G	6'2"	Senior	Green Bay, WI	Iowa State
Kamy Peppler	1	G	5'7"	Senior	Hortonville, WI	Milwaukee
Kallie Peppler	21	G	6'0"	Sophomore	Hortonville, WI	Milwaukee

=== 2025 recruiting class ===
College recruiting information
Name	Hometown	School	Height	Weight	Commit date
Kristina Ouimette; G/F	Minocqua, WI	Lakeland High School	6 ft 1 in (1.85 m)	N/A	Apr 25, 2024
Kristina Ouimette; G/F	Recruit ratings: No ratings found				
Madison Hoffmann; F	Grayslake, IL	Grayslake Central High School	6 ft 1 in (1.85 m)	N/A	Jun 6, 2024
Madison Hoffmann; F	Recruit ratings: No ratings found				

== Preseason ==
On October 9, 2025, the Horizon League released their preseason poll and league teams. Green Bay was picked to finish first in the conference, while receiving eight first-place votes. One player was named to the preseason All-Horizon League First Team, and another two players were named to the Second Team.

=== Preseason rankings ===
Horizon League Preseason Coaches Poll
Place	Team	Votes
1	Green Bay	117 (8)
2	Robert Morris	97 (1)
3	Youngstown State	92 (1)
4	Cleveland State	87 (1)
5	Purdue Fort Wayne	79
6	Northern Kentucky	70
7	Detroit Mercy	59
8	Wright State	47
9	Milwaukee	29
10	IU Indy	27
11	Oakland	22
(#) first-place votes

=== Preseason All-Horizon League Teams ===
Preseason All-Horizon League Teams
Team	Player	Position	Year
First	Maddy Skorupski	Guard	Senior
Second	Jenna Guyer	Forward/Center	RS Senior
Second	Kamy Peppler	Guard	Senior

== Roster ==
2025–26 Green Bay Phoenix women's basketball team
Players
Coaches

Pos.	#	Name	Height	Year	Previous school	Hometown
G	1	Kamy Peppler	5 ft 7 in (1.7 m)	Sr	Milwaukee	Hortonville, Wisconsin
G	2	Lily Hansford	6 ft 2 in (1.88 m)	Sr	Iowa State	Green Bay, Wisconsin
G	3	Maddy Skorupski	5 ft 8 in (1.73 m)	Sr	Oakland	Clarkston, Michigan
G	4	Maren Westin	5 ft 8 in (1.73 m)	RS So	Becker High School	Becker, Minnesota
F	5	Sophie Lahti (injured)	6 ft 1 in (1.85 m)	RS So	Pine City High School	Pine City, Minnesota
G	10	Julianna Ouimette	5 ft 10 in (1.78 m)	RS So	Lehigh	Minocqua, Wisconsin
G/F	13	Madison Hoffmann	6 ft 1 in (1.85 m)	Fr	Grayslake Central High School	Grayslake, Illinois
F	20	Carley Duffney	5 ft 10 in (1.78 m)	RS Sr	South Dakota	Green Bay, Wisconsin
G	21	Kallie Peppler	6 ft 0 in (1.83 m)	So	Milwaukee	Hortonville, Wisconsin
F	22	Gracie Grzesk	5 ft 11 in (1.8 m)	So	Wisconsin	Green Bay, Wisconsin
G	24	Ellie Buzzelle	5 ft 8 in (1.73 m)	Sr	Eastern Illinois	Rogers, Minnesota
F/C	30	Jenna Guyer	6 ft 2 in (1.88 m)	RS Sr	Centennial High School	Circle Pines, Minnesota
G/F	44	Kristina Ouimette	6 ft 1 in (1.85 m)	Fr	Lakeland Union High School	Minocqua, Wisconsin
F/C	55	Meghan Schultz	6 ft 4 in (1.93 m)	RS So	New Berlin West High School	Waukesha, Wisconsin

Head coach

- Kayla Karius (Green Bay)

Assistant coach(es)

- Kate Peterson Abiad (UW–Stevens Point)
- Sarah Bronk (St. Thomas (MN))
- Patrick Bowlin (St. John's)
- Shay Frederick (Butler)
- Jasmine Kondrakiewicz (Green Bay)

Legend

- (C) Team captain
- (S) Suspended
- (I) Ineligible
- (W) Walk-on
- Injured
- Current redshirt

Roster
Last update: January 22, 2026

== Schedule and results ==
Date time, TV	Rank^{#}	Opponent^{#}	Result	Record	High points	High rebounds	High assists	Site (attendance) city, state
Exhibition
October 18, 2025*; 4:00 pm		UW–Platteville	W 72–34	–	14 – Grzesk	9 – Schultz	5 – Schultz	Kress Events Center (1,761); Green Bay, WI
Regular season
November 3, 2025*; 6:00 pm, ESPN+		UW–Stevens Point	W 85–37	1–0	20 – Schultz	9 – Schultz	7 – Tied	Kress Events Center (1,857); Green Bay, WI
November 6, 2025*; 5:00 pm, ESPN+		at Loyola Chicago	W 55–46	2–0	15 – Skorupski	7 – Buzzelle	6 – Kam. Peppler	Gentile Arena (210); Chicago, IL
November 11, 2025*; 6:00 pm, ESPN+		North Dakota	W 67–43	3–0	26 – Schultz	7 – Tied	5 – Skorupski	Kress Events Center (1,903); Green Bay, WI
November 13, 2025*; 11:00 am, ESPN+		New Hampshire	W 76–64	4–0	13 – Duffney	5 – Grzesk	6 – Kam. Peppler	Kress Events Center (2,647); Green Bay, WI
November 16, 2025*; 2:00 pm, B1G+		at Wisconsin	L 72–76	4–1	22 – Schultz	10 – Skorupski	6 – Kam. Peppler	Kohl Center (3,330); Madison, WI
November 22, 2025*; 1:00 pm, ESPN+		Kansas State	W 47–44	5–1	13 – Skorupski	10 – Schultz	7 – Kam. Peppler	Kress Events Center (1,995); Green Bay, WI
November 27, 2025*; 3:00 pm, FloHoops		vs. No. 25 NC State; Cancun Challenge	L 67–79	5–2	23 – Grzesk	7 – Skorupski	4 – Tied	Hard Rock Hotel Riviera Maya (200); Cancún, Mexico
November 28, 2025*; 8:00 pm, FloHoops		vs. Richmond; Cancun Challenge	L 59–76	5–3	16 – Guyer	4 – Tied	3 – Tied	Hard Rock Hotel Riviera Maya; Cancún, Mexico
December 4, 2025; 5:00 pm, ESPN+		at Northern Kentucky	W 70–60	6–3 (1–0)	13 – Tied	6 – Tied	5 – Kam. Peppler	Truist Arena (939); Highland Heights, KY
December 7, 2025; 11:30 am, ESPN+		Youngstown State	W 56–47	7–3 (2–0)	22 – Schultz	8 – Schultz	5 – Kam. Peppler	Kress Events Center (1,610); Green Bay, WI
December 10, 2025; 5:30 pm, ESPN+		at IU Indy	W 74–47	8–3 (3–0)	13 – Schultz	6 – Schultz	7 – Skorupski	The Jungle (401); Indianapolis, IN
December 13, 2025*; 2:00 pm, B1G+		at No. 20 Washington	L 74–79	8–4	19 – Guyer	8 – Tied	9 – Kam. Peppler	Alaska Airlines Arena (2,603); Seattle, WA
December 20, 2025*; 2:00 pm, ESPN+		at Miami (OH)	L 50–66	8–5	12 – Guyer	6 – Skorupski	3 – Tied	Millett Hall (317); Oxford, OH
December 30, 2025; 6:00 pm, ESPN+		at Wright State	W 89–55	9–5 (4–0)	21 – Guyer	10 – Guyer	7 – Duffney	Nutter Center (1,205); Fairborn, OH
January 2, 2026; 6:00 pm, ESPN+		Cleveland State	W 58–55	10–5 (5–0)	15 – Guyer	8 – Skorupski	9 – Skorupski	Kress Events Center (2,300); Green Bay, WI
January 4, 2026; 1:00 pm, ESPN+		Robert Morris	W 64–43	11–5 (6–0)	19 – Guyer	6 – Tied	5 – Kam. Peppler	Kress Events Center (1,642); Green Bay, WI
January 8, 2026; 5:30 pm, ESPN+		at Oakland	W 78–63	12–5 (7–0)	21 – Skorupski	9 – Guyer	8 – Skorupski	OU Credit Union O'rena (733); Auburn Hills, MI
January 10, 2026; 12:00 pm, ESPN+		at Detroit Mercy	W 74–53	13–5 (8–0)	21 – Guyer	10 – Guyer	8 – Skorupski	Calihan Hall (305); Detroit, MI
January 14, 2026; 6:00 pm, ESPN+		Purdue Fort Wayne	W 69–57	14–5 (9–0)	17 – Guyer	12 – Skorupski	6 – Skorupski	Kress Events Center (1,808); Green Bay, WI
January 17, 2026; 6:00 pm, ESPN+		at Milwaukee	W 76–61	15–5 (10–0)	20 – Schultz	10 – Guyer	4 – Peppler	Klotsche Center (1,023); Milwaukee, WI
January 22, 2026; 6:00 pm, ESPN+		Oakland	W 73–59	16–5 (11–0)	19 – Skorupski	5 – Tied	5 – Guyer	Kress Events Center (1,689); Green Bay, WI
January 24, 2026; 1:00 pm, ESPN+		Detroit Mercy	W 72–61	17–5 (12–0)	22 – Skorupski	10 – Guyer	4 – Guyer	Kress Events Center (2,016); Green Bay, WI
January 29, 2026; 6:00 pm, ESPN+		Wright State	W 66–52	18–5 (13–0)	20 – Guyer	11 – Skorupski	8 – Kam. Peppler	Kress Events Center (2,260); Green Bay, WI
February 5, 2026; 10:00 am, ESPN+		at Robert Morris	W 61–58	19–5 (14–0)	13 – Skorupski	8 – Buzzelle	4 – Skorupski	UPMC Events Center (1,289); Moon Township, PA
February 7, 2026; 1:00 pm, ESPN+		at Youngstown State	W 54–51	20–5 (15–0)	16 – Guyer	7 – Tied	5 – Kam. Peppler	Beeghly Center (1,937); Youngstown, OH
February 11, 2026; 6:00 pm, ESPN+		at Cleveland State	L 82–83 ^{OT}	20–6 (15–1)	25 – Skorupski	9 – Guyer	7 – Kam. Peppler	Wolstein Center (456); Cleveland, OH
February 14, 2026; 1:00 pm, ESPN+		Northern Kentucky	L 59–77	20–7 (15–2)	16 – Schultz	5 – Tied	4 – Tied	Kress Events Center (2,371); Green Bay, WI
February 21, 2026; 1:00 pm, ESPN+		Milwaukee	W 91–57	21–7 (16–2)	23 – Guyer	6 – Tied	11 – Skorupski	Kress Events Center (3,243); Green Bay, WI
February 25, 2026; 6:00 pm, ESPN+		IU Indy	W 72–61	22–7 (17–2)	20 – Skorupski	8 – Guyer	5 – Skorupski	Kress Events Center (1,941); Green Bay, WI
February 28, 2026; 1:00 pm, ESPN+		at Purdue Fort Wayne	L 66–71	22–8 (17–3)	20 – Schultz	7 – Kam. Peppler	3 – Kam. Peppler	Gates Sports Center (702); Fort Wayne, IN
Horizon League tournament
March 4, 2026; 7:00 pm, ESPN+	(1)	(11) Detroit Mercy; First Round	W 81–57	23–8	25 – Guyer	10 – Skorupski	10 – Skorupski	Kress Events Center (1,916); Green Bay, WI
March 9, 2026; 11:00 am, ESPN+	(1)	vs. (5) Purdue Fort Wayne; Semifinal	W 73–48	24–8	20 – Duffney	10 – Tied	8 – Skorupski	Corteva Coliseum; Indianapolis, IN
March 10, 2026; 11:00 am, ESPN2	(1)	vs. (2) Youngstown State; Championship	W 57–49	25–8	21 – Guyer	6 – Tied	8 – Kam. Peppler	Corteva Coliseum; Indianapolis, IN
NCAA tournament
March 20, 2026*; 5:00 pm, ESPNU	(13 S2)	at (4 S2) No. 18 Minnesota; First Round	L 58–75	25–9	19 – Skorupski	6 – Skorupski	5 – Kam. Peppler	Williams Arena (10,355); Minneapolis, MN
*Non-conference game. ^{#}Rankings from AP poll. (#) Tournament seedings in parentheses. S2=Sacramento 2 region. All times are in Central.

== Injuries ==
On November 13, 2025, it was announced that Sophie Lahti would miss the season due to a knee injury she suffered during the pre-season.

On January 22, 2026, against Oakland, redshirt-sophomore guard Maren Westin returned to action since suffering a torn ACL back in December 2024, where she tallied a rebound and scoring a layup in her first ten seconds back.

In January 2026, the Phoenix lost two players for the season to injury. Sophomore guard Kallie Peppler suffered a foot injury, last playing on Jan. 4 vs. Robert Morris. Freshman forward Madison Hoffmann suffered a hip injury, last appearing on Jan. 10.
