= 2025–26 Wright State Raiders women's basketball team =

American college basketball season

2025–26 Wright State Raiders women's basketball
- Conference: Horizon League
- Record: 10–22 (6–14 Horizon)
- Head coach: Kari Hoffman (5th season)
- Associate head coach: John Leonzo
- Assistant coaches: Patrick Bain; Lauryn Fox; Olivia Trice
- Home arena: Nutter Center

2025–26 Horizon League women's basketball standings
	Conf.				Overall
Team	W		L	PCT	W		L	PCT
Green Bay †	17	–	3	.850	25	–	9	.735
Youngstown State	15	–	5	.750	25	–	10	.714
Cleveland State	13	–	7	.650	26	–	10	.722
Northern Kentucky	12	–	8	.600	15	–	17	.469
Purdue Fort Wayne	12	–	8	.600	21	–	14	.600
Robert Morris	11	–	9	.550	18	–	12	.600
IU Indy	9	–	11	.450	14	–	17	.452
Oakland	7	–	13	.350	10	–	21	.323
Wright State	6	–	14	.300	10	–	22	.313
Milwaukee	4	–	16	.200	8	–	24	.250
Detroit Mercy	4	–	16	.200	7	–	24	.226
† 2026 Horizon League tournament winner

The 2025–26 Wright State Raiders women's basketball team represented Wright State University during the 2025–26 NCAA Division I women's basketball season. The Raiders, led by fifth-year head coach Kari Hoffman, played their home games at the Nutter Center in Fairborn, Ohio as members of the Horizon League.

== Previous season ==
The Raiders finished the 2024–25 season 10–22, 7–13 in Horizon League play, to finish in a tie for eighth place. They defeated Youngstown State in the first round of the Horizon League tournament, before falling to Purdue Fort Wayne in the quarterfinals.

== Preseason ==
On October 9, 2025, the Horizon League released their preseason poll and league teams. Wright State was picked to finish eighth in the conference. No players were named to the preseason All-Horizon League First or Second Teams.

=== Preseason rankings ===
Horizon League Preseason Coaches Poll
Place	Team	Votes
1	Green Bay	117 (8)
2	Robert Morris	97 (1)
3	Youngstown State	92 (1)
4	Cleveland State	87 (1)
5	Purdue Fort Wayne	79
6	Northern Kentucky	70
7	Detroit Mercy	59
8	Wright State	47
9	Milwaukee	29
10	IU Indy	27
11	Oakland	22
(#) first-place votes

== Roster ==
2025–26 Wright State Raiders women's basketball team
Players
Coaches

Pos.	#	Name	Height	Year	Previous school	Hometown
G	0	Breezie Williams	5 ft 5 in (1.65 m)	Sr	Bryant	Canton, Ohio
G	1	Rylee Sagester	5 ft 7 in (1.7 m)	RS So	Tri-Village High School	West Alexandria, Ohio
G	5	Claire Henson	5 ft 10 in (1.78 m)	Sr	LIU	Germantown, Ohio
F	8	Grace Okih	6 ft 2 in (1.88 m)	RS Jr	Incarnate Word	Lagos, Nigeria
G	11	Elaina Rager	5 ft 9 in (1.75 m)	Fr	Pecatonica High School	Pecatonica, Illinois
G	12	Ellie Magestro-Kennedy	5 ft 9 in (1.75 m)	RS So	Janesville Craig High School	Stoughton, Wisconsin
G	13	Maja Dilen	5 ft 11 in (1.8 m)	Fr	Norrköping Dolphins	Åkersberga, Sweden
G	15	Abbie Riddle	5 ft 10 in (1.78 m)	RS So	Bowling Green	Baltimore, Ohio
G	20	Makenzie Drout	5 ft 9 in (1.75 m)	RS So	Appalachian State	Kimberly, Wisconsin
G	21	Lauren Scott	5 ft 7 in (1.7 m)	GS	Worthington Kilbourne High School	Worthington, Ohio
F	23	Florrie Cotterill	6 ft 2 in (1.88 m)	So	Itchen College	Lee-on-the-Solent, England
G	24	Olivia Brown	5 ft 7 in (1.7 m)	Jr	Akron	Fishers, Indiana
F	34	Chloe Chard Peloquin	6 ft 3 in (1.91 m)	Sr	Canisius	Johnstown, Ohio

Head coach

- Kari Hoffman (Cedarville)

Assistant coach(es)

- John Leonzo (Cedarville)
- Patrick Bain (Cedarville)
- Lauryn Fox (Cedarville)
- Olivia Trice (FIU)

Legend

- (C) Team captain
- (S) Suspended
- (I) Ineligible
- (W) Walk-on
- Injured
- Current redshirt

Roster
Last update: June 9, 2026

== Schedule and results ==
Date time, TV	Rank^{#}	Opponent^{#}	Result	Record	High points	High rebounds	High assists	Site (attendance) city, state
Regular season
November 3, 2025*; 11:00 am, ESPN+		at Butler	L 53–74	0–1	15 – Chard Peloquin	11 – Chard Peloquin	4 – Williams	Hinkle Fieldhouse (1,867); Indianapolis, IN
November 7, 2025*; 8:00 pm, ESPN+		at Tennessee State	W 85–80	1–1	27 – Williams	7 – Chard Peloquin	3 – Tied	Gentry Center (226); Nashville, TN
November 12, 2025*; 7:00 pm, ESPN+		Wilberforce	W 122–47	2–1	20 – Williams	8 – Dilen	12 – Brown	Nutter Center (1,157); Fairborn, OH
November 16, 2025*; 2:00 pm, ESPN+		Evansville	W 69–60	3–1	19 – Sagester	8 – Henson	6 – Henson	Nutter Center (1,106); Fairborn, OH
November 19, 2025*; 11:00 am, ESPN+		Bellarmine	L 76−83 ^{OT}	3−2	18 – Williams	12 – Henson	4 – Tied	Nutter Center (6,192); Fairborn, OH
November 22, 2025*; 12:00 pm, ESPN+		IU East	W 88−50	4−2	12 – Brown	7 – Tied	5 – Williams	Nutter Center (1,125); Fairborn, OH
November 24, 2025*; 7:00 pm, ESPN+		at Ohio	L 66–80	4–3	18 – Sagester	15 – Henson	3 – Williams	Convocation Center (541); Athens, OH
November 28, 2025*; 1:00 pm, ESPN+		at Florida Atlantic; FAU Thanksgiving Classic	L 65–66 ^{OT}	4–4	19 – Henson	9 – Tied	1 – Tied	Eleanor R. Baldwin Arena (731); Boca Raton, FL
November 29, 2025*; 1:00 pm, FloCollege		vs. Air Force; FAU Thanksgiving Classic	L 49–59	4–5	16 – Williams	8 – Henson	2 – Scott	Eleanor R. Baldwin Arena; Boca Raton, FL
December 3, 2025; 7:00 pm, ESPN+		Oakland	W 61–57	5–5 (1–0)	17 – Henson	10 – Henson	3 – Brown	Nutter Center (996); Fairborn, OH
December 7, 2025; 2:00 pm, ESPN+		at Purdue Fort Wayne	L 52–68	5–6 (1–1)	9 – Tied	10 – Williams	3 – Brown	Gates Sports Center (582); Fort Wayne, IN
December 12, 2025*; 6:30 pm, ESPN+		at Canisius	L 60−65	5−7	12 – Magestro-Kennedy	6 – Henson	2 – Tied	Koessler Athletic Center (466); Buffalo, NY
December 16, 2025; 6:30 pm, ESPN+		at Youngstown State	L 46–65	5–8 (1–2)	10 – Williams	5 – Williams	3 – Tied	Beeghly Center (1,153); Youngstown, OH
December 19, 2025*; 6:30 pm, SECN+		at No. 12 Kentucky	L 53–96	5–9	10 – Tied	8 – Henson	3 – Brown	Memorial Coliseum (4,188); Lexington, KY
December 30, 2025; 7:00 pm, ESPN+		Green Bay	L 55–89	5–10 (1–3)	20 – Williams	5 – Tied	3 – Tied	Nutter Center (1,205); Fairborn, OH
January 2, 2026; 7:00 pm, ESPN+		Detroit Mercy	W 82–71	6–10 (2–3)	26 – Williams	6 – Williams	3 – Williams	Nutter Center (1,119); Fairborn, OH
January 7, 2026; 7:00 pm, ESPN+		at Cleveland State	L 75–87	6–11 (2–4)	20 – Williams	4 – Williams	5 – Williams	Wolstein Center (432); Cleveland, OH
January 11, 2026; 1:00 pm, ESPN+		at IU Indy	L 59–70	6–12 (2–5)	13 – Tied	7 – Henson	2 – Tied	The Jungle (489); Indianapolis, IN
January 14, 2026; 7:00 pm, ESPN+		Youngstown State	L 67–78 ^{OT}	6–13 (2–6)	17 – Magestro-Kennedy	7 – Tied	7 – Williams	Nutter Center (1,085); Fairborn, OH
January 17, 2026; 2:00 pm, ESPN+		Northern Kentucky	L 56–82	6–14 (2–7)	14 – Williams	7 – Tied	5 – Brown	Nutter Center (1,101); Fairborn, OH
January 24, 2026; 3:30 pm, ESPN+		Robert Morris	L 53–74	6–15 (2–8)	15 – Scott	6 – Okih	6 – Williams	Nutter Center (3,730); Fairborn, OH
January 29, 2026; 7:00 pm, ESPN+		at Green Bay	L 52–66	6–16 (2–9)	12 – Okih	6 – Okih	2 – Williams	Kress Events Center (2,260); Green Bay, WI
January 31, 2026; 3:00 pm, ESPN+		at Milwaukee	L 70–75	6–17 (2–10)	13 – Henson	6 – Henson	8 – Williams	Klotsche Center (771); Milwaukee, WI
February 5, 2026; 7:00 pm, ESPN+		Purdue Fort Wayne	W 70–67	7–17 (3–10)	28 – Williams	8 – Tied	5 – Williams	Nutter Center (1,087); Fairborn, OH
February 7, 2026; 2:00 pm, ESPN+		IU Indy	L 63–73	7–18 (3–11)	21 – Williams	7 – Henson	4 – Williams	Nutter Center (1,164); Fairborn, OH
February 12, 2026; 7:00 pm, ESPN+		at Detroit Mercy	W 78–61	8–18 (4–11)	18 – Henson	8 – Williams	4 – Brown	Calihan Hall (300); Detroit, MI
February 14, 2026; 2:00 pm, ESPN+		at Oakland	W 62–44	9–18 (5–11)	24 – Williams	7 – Tied	3 – Tied	OU Credit Union O'rena; Auburn Hills, MI
February 18, 2026; 7:00 pm, ESPN+		Milwaukee	W 77–55	10–18 (6–11)	15 – Scott	10 – Okih	7 – Henson	Nutter Center (1,269); Fairborn, OH
February 21, 2026; 1:00 pm, ESPN+		at Northern Kentucky	L 62–68	10–19 (6–12)	17 – Williams	7 – Dilen	4 – Williams	Truist Arena (1,382); Highland Heights, KY
February 25, 2026; 7:00 pm, ESPN+		Cleveland State	L 55–81	10–20 (6–13)	20 – Henson	7 – Henson	3 – Tied	Nutter Center (1,158); Fairborn, OH
February 28, 2026; 4:00 pm, ESPN+		at Robert Morris	L 50–62	10–21 (6–14)	15 – Magestro-Kennedy	8 – Tied	5 – Brown	UPMC Events Center; Moon Township, PA
Horizon League tournament
March 4, 2026; 7:00 pm, ESPN+	(9)	at (2) Youngstown State; First Round	L 60–76	10–22	14 – Williams	10 – Henson	3 – Williams	Beeghly Center (2,007); Youngstown, OH
*Non-conference game. ^{#}Rankings from AP Poll. (#) Tournament seedings in parentheses. All times are in Eastern.
