= 2025–26 Milwaukee Panthers women's basketball team =

American college basketball season

2025–26 Milwaukee Panthers women's basketball
- Conference: Horizon League
- Record: 8–24 (4–16 Horizon)
- Head coach: Kyle Rechlicz (14th season)
- Associate head coach: John Pfaffl
- Assistant coaches: Fletcher Brown; Laynce Williams; Hannah Whitish
- Home arena: Klotsche Center

2025–26 Horizon League women's basketball standings
	Conf.				Overall
Team	W		L	PCT	W		L	PCT
Green Bay †	17	–	3	.850	25	–	9	.735
Youngstown State	15	–	5	.750	25	–	10	.714
Cleveland State	13	–	7	.650	26	–	10	.722
Northern Kentucky	12	–	8	.600	15	–	17	.469
Purdue Fort Wayne	12	–	8	.600	21	–	14	.600
Robert Morris	11	–	9	.550	18	–	12	.600
IU Indy	9	–	11	.450	14	–	17	.452
Oakland	7	–	13	.350	10	–	21	.323
Wright State	6	–	14	.300	10	–	22	.313
Milwaukee	4	–	16	.200	8	–	24	.250
Detroit Mercy	4	–	16	.200	7	–	24	.226
† 2026 Horizon League tournament winner

The 2025–26 Milwaukee Panthers women's basketball team represented the University of Wisconsin–Milwaukee during the 2025–26 NCAA Division I women's basketball season. The Panthers, led by 14th-year head coach Kyle Rechlicz, played their home games at the Klotsche Center in Milwaukee, Wisconsin as members of the Horizon League.

== Previous season ==
The Panthers finished the 2024–25 season 8–24, 5–15 in Horizon League play, to finish in last (eleventh) place. They fell to Detroit Mercy in the first round of the Horizon League tournament.

== Preseason ==
On October 9, 2025, the Horizon League released their preseason poll and league teams. Milwaukee was picked to finish ninth in the conference. No players were named to the preseason All-Horizon League First or Second Teams.

=== Preseason rankings ===
Horizon League Preseason Coaches Poll
Place	Team	Votes
1	Green Bay	117 (8)
2	Robert Morris	97 (1)
3	Youngstown State	92 (1)
4	Cleveland State	87 (1)
5	Purdue Fort Wayne	79
6	Northern Kentucky	70
7	Detroit Mercy	59
8	Wright State	47
9	Milwaukee	29
10	IU Indy	27
11	Oakland	22
(#) first-place votes

== Roster ==
2025–26 Milwaukee Panthers women's basketball team
Players
Coaches

Pos.	#	Name	Height	Year	Previous school	Hometown
G	00	Tierney Madigan	5 ft 10 in (1.78 m)	Fr	Laconia High School	Rosendale, Wisconsin
G	1	Kendall Barnes	5 ft 7 in (1.7 m)	RS Fr	East Ridge High School	Minneapolis, Minnesota
G	2	Jada Williams	5 ft 10 in (1.78 m)	RS Jr	Mason City High School	Mason City, Iowa
G	4	Lizzy Favret	6 ft 2 in (1.88 m)	Fr	Shaker Heights High School	Shaker Heights, Ohio
G/F	5	Payton Rechlicz	5 ft 11 in (1.8 m)	RS So	Menomonee Falls High School	Menomonee Falls, Wisconsin
F	11	Izzy Pugh	6 ft 3 in (1.91 m)	RS So	Westlake Girls High School	Auckland, New Zealand
G	13	Micayla Silas	5 ft 9 in (1.75 m)	Jr	Cochise	Oneida, Wisconsin
G	14	Madison Fitzgibbon	5 ft 6 in (1.68 m)	Fr	Homestead High School	Mequon, Wisconsin
G	16	Rita Gomes	5 ft 8 in (1.73 m)	Jr	Arizona Western	Lisbon, Portugal
G	22	Olivia Olson	5 ft 6 in (1.68 m)	Fr	Cuba City High School	Cuba City, Wisconsin
G	24	Valerie Cassidy-De Falco	5 ft 5 in (1.65 m)	So	Eastern Washington	Nottingham, United Kingdom
G	30	Sophia Rampulla	5 ft 11 in (1.8 m)	RS So	Union Grove High School	Union Grove, Wisconsin
F	32	Jorey Buwalda	6 ft 0 in (1.83 m)	Jr	Randolph High School	Randolph, Wisconsin
C	45	Cece McNair	6 ft 2 in (1.88 m)	RS Fr	Prior Lake High School	Prior Lake, Minnesota
G	52	Grace Lomen	5 ft 10 in (1.78 m)	Sr	Parkside	East Troy, Wisconsin

Head coach

- Kyle Rechlicz (Wisconsin)

Assistant coach(es)

- John Pfaffl (Cardinal Stritch)
- Fletcher Brown (UMaine Fort Kent)
- Laynce Williams (Memphis)
- Hannah Whitish (Nebraska)

Legend

- (C) Team captain
- (S) Suspended
- (I) Ineligible
- (W) Walk-on
- Injured
- Current redshirt

Roster
Last update: June 9, 2026

== Schedule and results ==
Date time, TV	Rank^{#}	Opponent^{#}	Result	Record	High points	High rebounds	High assists	Site (attendance) city, state
Regular season
November 3, 2025*; 7:00 pm, ESPN+		Loyola Chicago	L 55–59	0–1	18 – Buwalda	14 – Buwalda	2 – 2 tied	Klotsche Center (462); Milwaukee, WI
November 7, 2025*; 8:00 pm, ESPN+		at Northern Illinois	W 76–65	1–1	17 – Barnes	9 – Buwalda	4 – 2 tied	NIU Convocation Center (380); Dekalb, IL
November 10, 2025*; 7:30 pm, B1G+		at Wisconsin	L 46–75	1–2	8 – Williams	8 – Buwalda	2 – 2 tied	Kohl Center; Madison, WI
November 13, 2025*; 7:00 pm, ESPN+		Western Michigan	L 64–65	1–3	12 – Buwalda	8 – Buwalda	2 – 4 tied	Klotsche Center (392); Milwaukee, WI
November 16, 2025*; 5:00 pm, ESPN+		at Valparaiso	W 72–67 ^{OT}	2–3	23 – Lomen	17 – Buwalda	5 – Buwalda	Athletics-Recreation Center (276); Valparaiso, IN
November 19, 2025*; 7:00 pm, ESPN+		Marquette	L 43–75	2–4	12 – Buwalda	7 – Buwalda	2 – Cassidy-De Falco	Klotsche Center (822); Milwaukee, WI
November 23, 2025*; 2:00 pm, ESPN+		at Butler	L 53–67	2–5	11 – Buwalda	6 – 2 tied	3 – 2 tied	Hinkle Fieldhouse (811); Indianapolis, IN
November 28, 2025*; 6:30 pm, ESPN+		at Pacific; Tiger Turkey Tip-Off	L 48–77	2–6	20 – Madigan	6 – Buwalda	1 – 7 tied	Alex G. Spanos Center (443); Stockton, CA
November 29, 2025*; 4:00 pm, ESPN+		vs. UC Davis; Tiger Turkey Tip-Off	L 72–81	2–7	19 – Buwalda	9 – Madigan	4 – Barnes	Alex G. Spanos Center; Stockton, CA
December 5, 2025; 7:00 pm, ESPN+		Youngstown State	L 56–68	2–8 (0–1)	17 – Madigan	4 – Pugh	2 – Rechlicz	Klotsche Center (435); Milwaukee, WI
December 10, 2025; 5:00 pm, ESPN+		at Purdue Fort Wayne	L 60–70	2–9 (0–2)	20 – Buwalda	10 – Buwalda	6 – Fitzgibbon	Hilliard Gates Sports Center (2,092); Fort Wayne, IN
December 14, 2025*; 2:00 pm, ESPN+		Ripon	W 72–43	3–9	14 – Rechlicz	17 – Buwalda	3 – 2 tied	Klotsche Center (463); Milwaukee, WI
December 20, 2025*; 1:00 pm, ESPN+		Wisconsin Lutheran	W 76–52	4–9	21 – Lomen	10 – Lomen	2 – 4 tied	Klotsche Center (501); Milwaukee, WI
December 29, 2025; 6:30 pm, ESPN+		at IU Indy	L 49–58	4–10 (0–3)	19 – Buwalda	14 – Buwalda	3 – Rechlicz	The Jungle (303); Indianapolis, IN
January 2, 2026; 7:00 pm, ESPN+		Robert Morris	L 52–62	4–11 (0–4)	11 – Williams	5 – Buwalda	4 – Cassidy-De Falco	Klotsche Center (691); Milwaukee, WI
January 4, 2026; 3:00 pm, ESPN+		Cleveland State	W 66–58	5–11 (1–4)	20 – Buwalda	9 – Madigan	4 – 2 tied	Klotsche Center (440); Milwaukee, WI
January 8, 2026; 7:00 pm, ESPN+		at Detroit Mercy	W 74–61	6–11 (2–4)	21 – Lomen	11 – Buwalda	4 – Buwalda	Calihan Hall (297); Detroit, MI
January 10, 2026; 2:00 pm, ESPN+		at Oakland	L 45–66	6–12 (2–5)	10 – Barnes	5 – Lomen	2 – 2 tied	OU Credit Union O'rena (538); Rochester, MI
January 14, 2026; 6:00 pm, ESPN+		at Northern Kentucky	L 55–63	6–13 (2–6)	11 – Gomes	9 – Buwalda	3 – Cassidy-De Falco	Truist Arena (1,507); Highland Heights, KY
January 17, 2026; 2:00 pm, ESPN+		Green Bay	L 61–76	6–14 (2–7)	19 – Fitzgibbon	7 – Buwalda	4 – Rechlicz	Klotsche Center (1,023); Milwaukee, WI
January 22, 2026; 7:00 pm, ESPN+		Detroit Mercy	W 76–68	7–14 (3–7)	21 – Buwalda	10 – Buwalda	5 – Williams	Klotsche Center (308); Milwaukee, WI
January 24, 2026; 3:00 pm, ESPN+		Oakland	L 71–82	7–15 (3–8)	27 – Lomen	5 – 2 tied	4 – Buwalda	Klotsche Center (733); Milwaukee, WI
January 28, 2026; 7:00 pm, ESPN+		at Cleveland State	L 46–66	7–16 (3–9)	13 – Buwalda	12 – Buwalda	4 – Fitzgibbon	Wolstein Center (465); Cleveland, OH
January 31, 2026; 3:00 pm, ESPN+		Wright State	W 75–70	8–16 (4–9)	17 – Buwalda	8 – Buwalda	6 – Lomen	Klotsche Center (771); Milwaukee, WI
February 5, 2026; 6:30 pm, ESPN+		at Youngstown State	L 48–79	8–17 (4–10)	11 – McNair	13 – Buwalda	2 – 3 tied	Beeghly Center (1,318); Youngstown, OH
February 7, 2026; 2:00 pm, ESPN+		at Robert Morris	L 64–71 ^{OT}	8–18 (4–11)	30 – Lomen	9 – Buwalda	6 – Fitzgibbon	UPMC Events Center (578); Moon Township, PA
February 12, 2026; 12:00 pm, ESPN+		Northern Kentucky	L 56–59	8–19 (4–12)	15 – Rechlicz	7 – Buwalda	5 – Fitzgibbon	Klotsche Center (2,140); Milwaukee, WI
February 18, 2026; 7:00 pm, ESPN+		at Wright State	L 55–77	8–20 (4–13)	15 – Lomen	7 – Buwalda	2 – 4 tied	Nutter Center (1,269); Fairborn, OH
February 21, 2026; 2:00 pm, ESPN+		at Green Bay	L 57–91	8–21 (4–14)	14 – Buwalda	4 – Rampulla	5 – Williams	Kress Events Center (3,243); Green Bay, WI
February 25, 2026; 7:00 pm, ESPN+		Purdue Fort Wayne	L 52–71	8–22 (4–15)	13 – McNair	9 – McNair	2 – 3 tied	Klotsche Center (436); Milwaukee, WI
February 28, 2026; 3:00pm, ESPN+		IU Indy	L 77–80 ^{OT}	8–23 (4–16)	18 – Rampulla	9 – Buwalda	3 – 3 tied	Klotsche Center (721); Milwaukee, WI
Horizon League tournament
March 2, 2026; 8:00 pm, ESPN+	(10)	(11) Detroit Mercy; Play-In Round	L 67–69	8–24	22 – Madigan	12 – Buwalda	4 – 2 tied	Klotsche Center (462); Milwaukee, WI
*Non-conference game. ^{#}Rankings from AP poll. (#) Tournament seedings in parentheses. All times are in Central.
