= 2026 Horizon League women's basketball tournament =

American college basketball postseason tournament

- Classification: Division I
- Season: 2025–26
- Teams: 11
- Site: Campus sites (first two rounds); Corteva Coliseum; Indianapolis, Indiana (final three rounds)
- Champions: Green Bay (19th title)
- Winning coach: Kayla Karius (2nd title)
- MVP: Jenna Guyer (Green Bay)
- Television: ESPNU, ESPN2, ESPN+

2025–26 Horizon League women's basketball standings
	Conf.				Overall
Team	W		L	PCT	W		L	PCT
Green Bay †	17	–	3	.850	25	–	9	.735
Youngstown State	15	–	5	.750	25	–	10	.714
Cleveland State	13	–	7	.650	26	–	10	.722
Northern Kentucky	12	–	8	.600	15	–	17	.469
Purdue Fort Wayne	12	–	8	.600	21	–	14	.600
Robert Morris	11	–	9	.550	18	–	12	.600
IU Indy	9	–	11	.450	14	–	17	.452
Oakland	7	–	13	.350	10	–	21	.323
Wright State	6	–	14	.300	10	–	22	.313
Milwaukee	4	–	16	.200	8	–	24	.250
Detroit Mercy	4	–	16	.200	7	–	24	.226
† 2026 Horizon League tournament winner

The 2026 Horizon League Women's Basketball Tournament was the final event of the 2025–26 women's basketball season for the Horizon League. It was held from March 2–10, 2026; play-in and first-round games were played at the home courts of the better seeds, with all remaining games held at Corteva Coliseum in Indianapolis, Indiana. The tournament winner was Green Bay. The Phoenix received the conference's automatic berth to the NCAA Tournament. The tournament was sponsored by Barbasol for the fourth consecutive year.

The tournament adopted a new format in 2026; instead of a traditional eleven-team single elimination bracket, the new format included reseeding after each round. The event started on campus sites with a play-in round for the bottom two teams (by conference record), followed by a ten-team first round. The five remaining teams then advanced to the final three rounds held at Corteva Coliseum. The bottom two teams by seeding play in the second round, while the other three teams are forwarded into the semifinals, with those winners advancing to the final.

== Seeds ==
All of the teams in the league participated in the tournament, with the bottom two teams starting in the play-in round. The bracket was reset after each round so that the highest remaining seed always played the lowest.

Seed	School	League Record	Tiebreaker (1)	Tiebreaker (2)
1	Green Bay	17–3		
2	Youngstown State	15–5		
3	Cleveland State	13–7		
4	Northern Kentucky	12−8	1–1 vs. Purdue Fort Wayne	1–1 vs. Youngstown State
5	Purdue Fort Wayne	12−8	1–1 vs. Northern Kentucky	0–2 vs. Youngstown State
6	Robert Morris	11−9		
7	IU Indy	9–11		
8	Oakland	8−12		
9	Wright State	6–14		
10	Milwaukee	4–16	2–0 vs. Detroit Mercy	
11	Detroit Mercy	4–16	0–2 vs. Milwaukee	

== Schedule ==
Game	Time	Matchup	Score	Attendance	Television
Play-In Round – Monday, March 2 Campus Site
1	7:00 p.m.	No. 11 Detroit Mercy at No. 10 Milwaukee	69–67	462	ESPN+
First Round – Wednesday, March 4 Campus Sites
2	7:00 p.m.	No. 11 Detroit Mercy at No. 1 Green Bay	57–81	1,916	ESPN+
3	7:00 p.m.	No. 9 Wright State at No. 2 Youngstown State	60–76	2,007	ESPN+
4	7:00 p.m.	No. 8 Oakland at No. 3 Cleveland State	80–81^{OT}	501	ESPN+
5	7:00 p.m.	No. 7 IU Indy at No. 4 Northern Kentucky	74–72	892	ESPN+
6	7:00 p.m.	No. 6 Robert Morris at No. 5 Purdue Fort Wayne	43–73	640	ESPN+
Second Round – Sunday, March 8 Indianapolis, IN (Corteva Coliseum)
7	1:00 p.m.	No. 5 Purdue Fort Wayne vs. No. 7 IU Indy	85–49		ESPN+
Semifinals – Monday, March 9 Indianapolis, IN (Corteva Coliseum)
8	12:00 p.m.	No. 1 Green Bay vs. No. 5 Purdue Fort Wayne	73–48		ESPN+
9	2:30 p.m.	No. 2 Youngstown State vs. No. 3 Cleveland State	60–55		ESPN+
Final – Tuesday, March 10 Indianapolis, IN (Corteva Coliseum)
10	12:00 p.m.	No. 1 Green Bay vs. No. 2 Youngstown State	57–49		ESPN2
Play-In and First Round game times are local standard time; Second Round, Semifinal and Final game times are Eastern Daylight Time. Rankings denote tournament seed

== Bracket ==
Play-In Round; March 2 Campus Site; ESPN+
10	Milwaukee	67
11	Detroit Mercy	69

First Round; March 4 Campus Sites; ESPN+
1	Green Bay	81
11	Detroit Mercy	57
2	Youngstown State	76
9	Wright State	60
3	Cleveland State	81*
8	Oakland	80
4	Northern Kentucky	72
7	IU Indy	74
5	Purdue Fort Wayne	73
6	Robert Morris	43

Second Round; March 8 Indianapolis, IN; ESPN+
5	Purdue Fort Wayne	85
7	IU Indy	49

Semifinals; March 9 Indianapolis, IN; ESPNU/ESPN2
1	Green Bay	73
5	Purdue Fort Wayne	48
2	Youngstown State	60
3	Cleveland State	55

Final; March 10; Indianapolis, IN; ESPN
1	Green Bay	57
2	Youngstown State	49

* denotes overtime period

== Game summaries ==
=== Play-In Round ===
ESPN+

March 2
7:00 p.m. EST

Report

No. 10 Milwaukee 67, No. 11 Detroit Mercy 69
Scoring by quarter: 11–17, 20–20, 24–16, 12–16
Pts: Buwalda (19); Rebs: Buwalda (12); Asts: Buwalda, Fitzgibbon (4)	Pts: Edwards, Jackson (17); Rebs: McQueen (8); Asts: Jackson (5)
Game 1

Wolstein Center
Cleveland, OH
Attendance: 462
Referees: Tim Daley, Jamie Broderick, Kelsey Reynolds

=== First Round ===
ESPN+

March 4
7:00 p.m. EST

Report

No. 1 Green Bay 81, No. 11 Detroit Mercy 57
Scoring by quarter: 17–13, 27–12, 18–14, 19–18
Pts: Guyer (25); Rebs: Skorupski (10); Asts: Skorupski (10)	Pts: Edwards (17); Rebs: Edwards (12); Asts: Burrell (5)
Game 1

Kress Events Center
Green Bay, WI
Attendance: 1,916
Referees: Morgan Taylor, Xiomara Cruz-Johnson, Kelsey Reynolds

ESPN+

March 4
7:00 p.m.

Report

No. 2 Youngstown State 76, No. 9 Wright State 60
Scoring by quarter: 20–16, 10–13, 23–14, 23–17
Pts: King (19); Rebs: Hernandez (7); Asts: Gregory, Santoro (6)	Pts: Williams (14); Rebs: Henson (10); Asts: Williams (3)
Game 2

Beeghly Center
Youngstown, OH
Attendance: 2,007
Referees: Robert McDow, Matt Balster, Kristie Watkins-Day

ESPN+

March 4
7:00 p.m.

Report

No. 3 Cleveland State 81, No. 8 Oakland 80 (OT) (OT)
Scoring by quarter: 8–19, 21–12, 24–20, 19–21, Overtime: 9–8
Pts: Zingaro (29); Rebs: Zingaro (10); Asts: Fegan (5)	Pts: Luehring (39); Rebs: Goula (8); Asts: Goula (8)
Game 3

Woodling Gym
Cleveland, OH
Attendance: 501
Referees: Eric Pethtel, Lauren Niemniera, Kalei Enterline

ESPN+

March 4
7:00 p.m.

Report

No. 4 Northern Kentucky 72, No. 7 IU Indy 74
Scoring by quarter: 18–17, 13–10, 22–26, 19-21
Pts: Meredith (16); Rebs: Meredith (8); Asts: Bystry (6)	Pts: O. Smith (20); Rebs: H. Smith (9); Asts: H. Smith (3)
Game 4

Truist Arena
Highland Heights, KY
Attendance: 892
Referees: Molly Caldwell, Royce Blevins, Josh Howell

ESPN+

March 4
8:00 p.m.

Report

No. 5 Purdue Fort Wayne 73, No. 6 Robert Morris 43
Scoring by quarter: 13–10, 20–19, 22–6, 18–8
Pts: Reid (15); Rebs: Krasovec (9); Asts: Lee, Lokica (3)	Pts: Traore (12); Rebs: Levingston (7); Asts: Kuhns (6)
Game 5

Hilliard Gates Sports Center
Fort Wayne, IN
Attendance: 640
Referees: Robert Miles, Rachael Wood, Mark Berger

=== Second Round ===
ESPN+

March 8
3:30 p.m. EDT

Report

No. 5 Purdue Fort Wayne 85, No. 7 IU Indy 49
Scoring by quarter: 13–10, 26–14, 26–12, 20–13
Pts: Offing (14); Rebs: Nelson, Krasovec (10); Asts: Riggs (4)	Pts: H. Smith (20); Rebs: Williams (6); Asts: O. Smith (4)
Game 1

Corteva Coliseum
Indianapolis, IN
Referees: Tim Daley, Cameron Inouye, Kevin Pethtel

=== Semifinal Round ===
ESPNU

March 9
12:00 p.m. EDT

Report

No. 1 Green Bay 73, No. 5 Purdue Fort Wayne 48
Scoring by quarter: 13–9, 21–14, 25–12, 14–13
Pts: Duffney (20); Rebs: Skorupski, Schultz (10); Asts: Skorupski (8)	Pts: Reid (14); Rebs: Krasovec, Reid, Nelson (4); Asts: Lee (3)
Game 1

Corteva Coliseum
Indianapolis, IN
Referees: Cameron Inouye, Kevin Pethtel, Michael McConnell

ESPN2

March 9
2:30 p.m.

No. 2 Youngstown State 60, No. 3 Cleveland State 55
Scoring by quarter: 14–12, 10–11, 11–17, 25–15
Pts: Cameron (16); Rebs: Gregory (9); Asts: Santoro (6)	Pts: Zingaro (19); Rebs: Zingaro (14); Asts: Maples (7)
Game 2

Corteva Coliseum
Indianapolis, IN
Referees: Maggie Tieman, Angie Enlund, Tim Daley

=== Final Round ===
ESPN

March 10
12:00 p.m. EDT

No. 1 Green Bay 57, No. 2 Youngstown State 49
Scoring by quarter: 9–11, 16–17, 15–11, 17–10
Pts: Guyer (21); Rebs: Peppler, Skorupski (6); Asts: Peppler (8)	Pts: Hernandez (12); Rebs: Santoro (9); Asts: King (4)
Championship

Corteva Coliseum
Indianapolis, IN
Referees: Michael McConnell, Cameron Inouye, Maggie Tieman
