= 2025–26 Robert Morris Colonials women's basketball team =

American college basketball season

2025–26 Robert Morris Colonials women's basketball
- Conference: Horizon League
- Record: 18–12 (11–9 Horizon)
- Head coach: Chandler McCabe (2nd season)
- Assistant coaches: Eddie Benton; Jack Trosper; Laryn Edwards
- Home arena: UPMC Events Center

2025–26 Horizon League women's basketball standings
	Conf.				Overall
Team	W		L	PCT	W		L	PCT
Green Bay †	17	–	3	.850	25	–	9	.735
Youngstown State	15	–	5	.750	25	–	10	.714
Cleveland State	13	–	7	.650	26	–	10	.722
Northern Kentucky	12	–	8	.600	15	–	17	.469
Purdue Fort Wayne	12	–	8	.600	21	–	14	.600
Robert Morris	11	–	9	.550	18	–	12	.600
IU Indy	9	–	11	.450	14	–	17	.452
Oakland	7	–	13	.350	10	–	21	.323
Wright State	6	–	14	.300	10	–	22	.313
Milwaukee	4	–	16	.200	8	–	24	.250
Detroit Mercy	4	–	16	.200	7	–	24	.226
† 2026 Horizon League tournament winner

The 2025–26 Robert Morris Colonials women's basketball team represented Robert Morris University during the 2025–26 NCAA Division I women's basketball season. The Colonials, led by second-year head coach Chandler McCabe, played their home games at the UPMC Events Center in Moon Township, Pennsylvania, as members of the Horizon League.

== Previous season ==
The Colonials finished the 2024–25 season 14–15, 10–10 in Horizon League play, to finish in fourth place. They defeated Northern Kentucky before falling to Green Bay in the semifinals of the Horizon League tournament.

== Preseason ==
On October 9, 2025, the Horizon League released their preseason poll and league teams. Robert Morris was picked to finish second in the conference, while receiving one first-place vote. Two players were named to the preseason All-Horizon League Second Team.

=== Preseason rankings ===
Horizon League Preseason Coaches Poll
Place	Team	Votes
1	Green Bay	117 (8)
2	Robert Morris	97 (1)
3	Youngstown State	92 (1)
4	Cleveland State	87 (1)
5	Purdue Fort Wayne	79
6	Northern Kentucky	70
7	Detroit Mercy	59
8	Wright State	47
9	Milwaukee	29
10	IU Indy	27
11	Oakland	22
(#) first-place votes

=== Preseason All-Horizon League Teams ===
Preseason All-Horizon League Teams
Team	Player	Position	Year
Second	Noa Givon	Guard	Senior
Second	Aislin Malcolm	Guard	Senior

== Roster ==
2025–26 Robert Morris Colonials women's basketball team
Players
Coaches

Pos.	#	Name	Height	Year	Previous school	Hometown
F	0	Markeli Jones-Tynes	5 ft 8 in (1.73 m)	Fr	Westminster Academy	Fort Lauderdale, Florida
G/F	1	Sanai Troutman	5 ft 11 in (1.8 m)	Fr	Bullis School	Frederick, Maryland
G	2	Aislin Malcolm	5 ft 11 in (1.8 m)	Sr	Pitt	Carnegie, Pennsylvania
C	3	Layke Fields	6 ft 0 in (1.83 m)	Fr	Kennedy Catholic High School	Farrell, Pennsylvania
G/F	6	Jennica Suggs	5 ft 11 in (1.8 m)	So	Central Florida Christian Academy	St. Paul, Minnesota
G/F	7	Myriam Traore	6 ft 3 in (1.91 m)	So	Siena	Lognes, France
G	10	Mallory Daly	5 ft 8 in (1.73 m)	So	Buffalo	Pittsburgh, Pennsylvania
G	11	London Creach	5 ft 9 in (1.75 m)	Fr	Oakland Catholic High School	Pittsburgh, Pennsylvania
G/F	14	Dania McClain	6 ft 2 in (1.88 m)	Fr	South Lake High School	Harper Woods, Michigan
C	18	Ava Leroux	6 ft 4 in (1.93 m)	RS So	Elon	Bridgeville, Pennsylvania
G	20	Jada Lee	5 ft 6 in (1.68 m)	GS	Mount St. Mary's	Pittsburgh, Pennsylvania
F	23	Eva Levingston	6 ft 0 in (1.83 m)	Jr	Cal State Fullerton	Oakland, California
G	32	Noa Givon	5 ft 10 in (1.78 m)	Sr	Iona	Ra'anana, Israel
F	34	Bailey Kuhns	5 ft 11 in (1.8 m)	Sr	Mercyhurst	Mount Pleasant, Pennsylvania

Head coach

- Chandler McCabe (Providence)

Assistant coach(es)

- Eddie Benton (Vermont)
- Jack Trosper (Texas A&M–CC)
- Laryn Edwards (Loyola (MD))

Legend

- (C) Team captain
- (S) Suspended
- (I) Ineligible
- (W) Walk-on
- Injured
- Current redshirt

Roster
Last update: May 18, 2026

== Schedule and results ==
Date time, TV	Rank^{#}	Opponent^{#}	Result	Record	High points	High rebounds	High assists	Site (attendance) city, state
Regular season
November 3, 2025*; 5:00 pm, ESPN+		at UIC	W 78–63	1–0	26 – Malcolm	8 – Lee	6 – Lee	Credit Union 1 Arena; Chicago, IL
November 7, 2025*; 6:00 pm, ESPN+		Akron	W 70–61	2–0	20 – Malcolm	11 – Kuhns	3 – 2 tied	UPMC Events Center (922); Moon Township, PA
November 13, 2025*; 7:00 pm, NEC Front Row		at Saint Francis	W 71–61	3–0	18 – Levingston	8 – Levingston	3 – Levingston	DeGol Arena (436); Loretto, Pennsylvania
November 18, 2025*; 6:00 pm, ESPN+		Duquesne	W 64–62	4–0	13 – Traore	5 – 3 tied	3 – Lee	UPMC Events Center (1,255); Moon Township, PA
November 22, 2025*; 1:00 pm, ACCNX		at Pitt	L 54–63	4–1	11 – 2 tied	7 – 2 tied	6 – Givon	Petersen Events Center (839); Pittsburgh, PA
November 26, 2025*; 1:00 pm, ESPN+		at Eastern Michigan	L 54–64	4–2	25 – Kuhns	7 – 2 tied	2 – 2 tied	George Gervin GameAbove Center (1,242); Ypsilanti, Michigan
December 3, 2025*; 11:00 am, NEC Front Row		at Mercyhurst	W 73–71	5–2	24 – Fields	9 – Traore	4 – 2 tied	Mercyhurst Athletic Center (578); Erie, PA
December 7, 2025; 1:00 pm, ESPN+		at Northern Kentucky	W 60–58	6–2 (1–0)	17 – Traore	9 – Levingston	4 – Lee	Truist Arena (1,32); Highland Heights, KY
December 13, 2025*; 4:00 pm, ESPN+		California (PA)	W 72–44	7–2	16 – Levingston	8 – 2 tied	4 – 2 tied	UPMC Events Center (412); Moon Township, PA
December 16, 2025; 6:00 pm, ESPN+		Detroit Mercy	W 60–52	8–2 (2–0)	13 – Traore	8 – Kuhns	5 – Malcolm	UPMC Events Center (357); Moon Township, PA
December 19, 2025*; 6:00 pm, ESPN+		Point Park	W 79–29	9–2	17 – McClain	11 – Suggs	7 – Daly	UPMC Events Center (111); Moon Township, PA
December 29, 2025; 4:00 pm, ESPN+		Oakland	L 58–61	9–3 (2–1)	23 – Kuhns	12 – Kuhns	4 – Levingston	UPMC Events Center (428); Moon Township, PA
January 2, 2026; 7:00 pm, ESPN+		at Milwaukee	W 62–52	10–3 (3–1)	18 – Malcolm	10 – Traore	3 – Lee	Klotsche Center (691); Milwaukee, WI
January 4, 2026; 2:00 pm, ESPN+		at Green Bay	L 43–64	10–4 (3–2)	13 – Givon	7 – Traore	1 – 5 tied	Kress Events Center (1,642); Green Bay, WI
January 8, 2026; 6:00 pm, ESPN+		Purdue Fort Wayne	W 74–64	11–4 (4–2)	20 – Malcolm	6 – 2 tied	6 – Lee	UPMC Events Center (281); Moon Township, PA
January 10, 2026; 11:00 am, ESPN+		Northern Kentucky	L 76–81	11–5 (4–3)	23 – Malcolm	7 – Levingston	3 – 3 tied	UPMC Events Center (213); Moon Township, PA
January 15, 2026; 6:00 pm, ESPN+		IU Indy	W 80–70 ^{OT}	12–5 (5–3)	22 – Traore	7 – Levingston	6 – Malcolm	UPMC Events Center (515); Moon Township, PA
January 18, 2026; 2:00 pm, ESPN+		at Cleveland State	L 61–68	12–6 (5–4)	18 – Traore	7 – Leroux	4 – 2 tied	Wolstein Center (508); Cleveland, OH
January 21, 2026; 6:00 pm, ESPN+		Youngstown State	W 55–40	13–6 (6–4)	13 – Levingston	10 – Levingston	3 – Malcolm	UPMC Events Center (873); Moon Township, PA
January 24, 2026; 3:30 pm, ESPN+		at Wright State	W 74–53	14–6 (7–4)	22 – Traore	8 – Leroux	7 – Lee	Nutter Center (3,730); Fairborn, OH
January 27, 2026; 7:00 pm, ESPN+		at Purdue Fort Wayne	L 46–60	14–7 (7–5)	13 – Levingston	7 – Traore	3 – Kuhns	Hilliard Gates Sports Center (653); Fort Wayne, IN
February 1, 2026; 1:00 pm, ESPN+		at IU Indy	W 76–71	15–7 (8–5)	21 – Leroux	7 – 2 tied	5 – Traore	The Jungle (246); Indianapolis, IN
February 5, 2026; 11:00 am, ESPN+		Green Bay	L 58–61	15–8 (8–6)	18 – Kuhns	9 – Kuhns	2 – 3 tied	UPMC Events Center (1,289); Moon Township, PA
February 7, 2026; 2:00 pm, ESPN+		Milwaukee	W 71–64 ^{OT}	16–8 (9–6)	19 – Levingston	11 – Lee	5 – Malcolm	UPMC Events Center (578); Moon Township, PA
February 11, 2026; 6:30 pm, ESPN+		at Youngstown State	L 62–69 ^{OT}	16–9 (9–7)	20 – Traore	7 – Kuhns	3 – 2 tied	Beeghly Center (1,509); Youngstown, OH
February 14, 2026; 2:00 pm, ESPN+		Cleveland State	L 52–57	16–10 (9–8)	17 – Traore	10 – Levingston	5 – Lee	UPMC Events Center (412); Moon Township, PA
February 19, 2026; 7:00 pm, ESPN+		at Detroit Mercy	W 66–55	17–10 (10–8)	22 – Traore	10 – Levingston	3 – 2 tied	Calihan Hall (416); Detroit, MI
February 21, 2026; 2:00 pm, ESPN+		at Oakland	L 61–71	17–11 (10–9)	21 – Levingston	8 – Kuhns	5 – Traore	OU Credit Union O'rena (678); Rochester, MI
February 28, 2026; 4:00 pm, ESPN+		Wright State	W 62–50	18–11 (11–9)	19 – Traore	8 – Lee	4 – 3 tied	UPMC Events Center; Moon Township, PA
Horizon League tournament
March 4, 2026; 7:00 pm, ESPN+	(6)	at (5) Purdue Fort Wayne; First Round	L 43–73	18–12	12 – Traore	7 – Levingston	2 – Kuhns	Gates Sports Center (640); Fort Wayne, IN
*Non-conference game. ^{#}Rankings from AP poll. (#) Tournament seedings in parentheses. All times are in Eastern.
