= Megan Lukan =

- Born: February 14, 1992 (age 34) Toronto, Ontario, Canada
- Height: 1.70 m (5 ft 7 in)
- Weight: 57 kg (126 lb)
- University: University of Wisconsin–Green Bay; Queen's University

Rugby union career
National sevens team
Years	Team	Comps
2016-	Canada 7s	
Medal record
Women's rugby sevens
Representing Canada
Olympic Games
Bronze medal – third place	2016 Rio de Janeiro	Team competition

Megan Eveliene Lukan (born February 14, 1992) is a Canadian former Olympic rugby union and college basketball player.

Lukan attended the National Elite Development Academy run by Canada Basketball.

At the University of Wisconsin–Green Bay she was a four-year starting guard for the Green Bay women's Division l basketball team. During her UWGB basketball career, Lukan set a number of records including most minutes played during a career as well as the most assists for the program before legend Bailey Butler surpassed her assists record in 2025.

Lukan switched to rugby union after graduating in May 2015. She was named to Canada's first ever women's rugby sevens Olympic team at the 2016 Summer Olympics, where the team won a bronze medal. In 2018, she was selected by the Canadian Olympic Committee to be sponsored to attend Smith School of Business' MBA program at Queen's University.

Lukan's younger sister Kaili Lukan also played basketball at University of Wisconsin-Green Bay and was a member of the Canada women's national rugby sevens team.

As of 2019, Lukan considers herself retired from athletics.

== Green Bay statistics ==
Legend
GP	Games played	GS	Games started	MPG	Minutes per game
FG%	Field goal percentage	3P%	3-point field goal percentage	FT%	Free throw percentage
RPG	Rebounds per game	APG	Assists per game	SPG	Steals per game
BPG	Blocks per game	PPG	Points per game	**Bold**	Career high

Year	Team	GP	Points	FG%	3P%	FT%	RPG	APG	SPG	BPG	PPG
2010-11	Green Bay	Redshirt									
2011-12	Green Bay	**33**	218	**43.3%**	**32.4%**	61.9%	3.4	2.8	1.7	0.1	6.6
2012-13	Green Bay	32	226	39.8%	29.8%	**77.0%**	2.8	4.4	1.3	0.0	7.1
2013-14	Green Bay	32	**287**	40.2%	23.5%	64.3%	**5.1**	4.2	**1.6**	0.1	**9.0**
2014-15	Green Bay	**33**	221	36.2%	14.6%	64.5%	5.0	**4.7**	1.5	**0.1**	6.7
Career		130	952	39.7%	26.6%	66.2%	4.1	4.0	1.5	0.1	7.3
