= 2025–26 Cleveland State Vikings women's basketball team =

American college basketball season

2025–26 Cleveland State Vikings women's basketball

WNIT, Great 8
- Conference: Horizon League
- Record: 26–10 (13–7 Horizon)
- Head coach: Chris Kielsmeier (8th season)
- Assistant coaches: Jenna Bolstad; Steve Lanpher; Chenara Wilson; Shelby Zoeckler
- Home arena: Wolstein Center

2025–26 Horizon League women's basketball standings
	Conf.				Overall
Team	W		L	PCT	W		L	PCT
Green Bay †	17	–	3	.850	25	–	9	.735
Youngstown State	15	–	5	.750	25	–	10	.714
Cleveland State	13	–	7	.650	26	–	10	.722
Northern Kentucky	12	–	8	.600	15	–	17	.469
Purdue Fort Wayne	12	–	8	.600	21	–	14	.600
Robert Morris	11	–	9	.550	18	–	12	.600
IU Indy	9	–	11	.450	14	–	17	.452
Oakland	7	–	13	.350	10	–	21	.323
Wright State	6	–	14	.300	10	–	22	.313
Milwaukee	4	–	16	.200	8	–	24	.250
Detroit Mercy	4	–	16	.200	7	–	24	.226
† 2026 Horizon League tournament winner

The 2025–26 Cleveland State Vikings women's basketball team represented Cleveland State University during the 2025–26 NCAA Division I women's basketball season. The Vikings, led by eighth-year head coach Chris Kielsmeier, played their home games at the Wolstein Center in Cleveland, Ohio as members of the Horizon League.

== Previous season ==
The Vikings finished the 2024–25 season 27–10, 14–6 in Horizon League play, to finish in third place. They defeated Detroit Mercy before falling to Purdue Fort Wayne in the semifinals of the Horizon League tournament. They received an at-large bid to the WNIT, where they defeated Coppin State in overtime in the Second Round, Duquesne in the Super 16, and Purdue Fort Wayne in the Great 8. In their first-ever Fab Four appearance, the Vikings were defeated by eventual champion Buffalo, 69–74.

== Preseason ==
On October 9, 2025, the Horizon League released their preseason poll and league teams. Cleveland State was picked to finish fourth in the conference, while receiving one first-place vote. One player was named to the preseason All-Horizon League First Team, and was also named the preseason Player of the Year.

=== Preseason rankings ===
Horizon League Preseason Coaches Poll
Place	Team	Votes
1	Green Bay	117 (8)
2	Robert Morris	97 (1)
3	Youngstown State	92 (1)
4	Cleveland State	87 (1)
5	Purdue Fort Wayne	79
6	Northern Kentucky	70
7	Detroit Mercy	59
8	Wright State	47
9	Milwaukee	29
10	IU Indy	27
11	Oakland	22
(#) first-place votes

=== Preseason All-Horizon League Teams ===
Preseason All-Horizon League Teams
Team	Player	Position	Year
First	Colbi Maples	Guard	Graduate student

== Roster ==
2025–26 Cleveland State Vikings women's basketball team
Players
Coaches

Pos.	#	Name	Height	Year	Previous school	Hometown
G	0	Queen Ruffin	5 ft 6 in (1.68 m)	Jr	Indiana State	Moreno Valley, California
F	1	Colby Guinta	5 ft 11 in (1.8 m)	Sr	Suffolk University	Manchester, New Hampshire
G	3	Jada Leonard	5 ft 8 in (1.73 m)	RS Jr	Bryant	Bronx, New York
G	7	Hanna Medina Kajevic	5 ft 7 in (1.7 m)	Fr	Hagagymnasiet	Norrköping, Sweden
G	9	Sarah Hurley	6 ft 1 in (1.85 m)	So	Lincoln Prep	Pelham, Ontario
G	10	Paula Pique	6 ft 1 in (1.85 m)	So	Abilene Christian	Barcelona, Spain
G	11	Colbi Maples (5Y)	5 ft 8 in (1.73 m)	GS	Grambling State	Earle, Arkansas
F	12	Ayisse Magassa	6 ft 1 in (1.85 m)	Sr	La Salle	Paris, France
C	13	Izabella Zingaro (5Y)	6 ft 4 in (1.93 m)	GS	Montana	Bolton, Ontario
G	19	Sur Lozano	6 ft 1 in (1.85 m)	Fr	Colegio Luyferivas	Madrid, Spain
C	20	Laurel Rockwood (5Y)	6 ft 4 in (1.93 m)	GS	Toledo	Henderson, Nevada
F	21	Madison Royal-Davis	5 ft 11 in (1.8 m)	RS Sr	Oakland	Toledo, Ohio
F	25	Ella Van Weelden	6 ft 2 in (1.88 m)	GS	Northern Colorado	Cedar Rapids, Iowa
F	30	Macey Fegan	5 ft 11 in (1.8 m)	Jr	Toledo	Bentley, Michigan

Head coach

- Chris Kielsmeier (Iowa State)

Assistant coach(es)

- Jenna Bolstad (Black Hills State)
- Steve Lanpher (St. Joseph)
- Chenara Wilson (Cleveland State)
- Shelby Zoeckler (Cleveland State)

Legend

- (C) Team captain
- (S) Suspended
- (I) Ineligible
- (W) Walk-on
- (5Y) Fifth-year senior
- Injured
- Current redshirt

Roster
Last update: March 26, 2026

== Schedule and results ==
Date time, TV	Rank^{#}	Opponent^{#}	Result	Record	High points	High rebounds	High assists	Site (attendance) city, state
Exhibition
October 29, 2025*; 7:00 p.m.		Findlay	W 75–55	–	–	–	–	Wolstein Center; Cleveland, OH
Regular season
November 3, 2025*; 7:00 p.m., ESPN+		Chicago State	W 71–49	1–0	29 – Maples	13 – Fegan	4 – 2 tied	Wolstein Center (382); Cleveland, OH
November 9, 2025*; 5:00 p.m., ESPN+		at Cal State Fullerton	W 68–61	2–0	16 – Zingaro	12 – Zingaro	8 – Leonard	Titan Gym (262); Fullerton, CA
November 12, 2025*; 7:00 p.m., ESPN+		Pitt–Johnstown	W 97–24	3–0	18 – Zingaro	13 – Royal-Davis	5 – Royal-Davis	Wolstein Center (312); Cleveland, OH
November 16, 2025*; 2:00 p.m., ESPN+		Akron	W 76–55	4–0	27 – Leonard	10 – Magassa	3 – Royal-Davis	Wolstein Center (303); Cleveland, OH
November 21, 2025*; 7:30 p.m., B1G+		at Northwestern	L 68–75	4–1	24 – Maples	8 – Zingaro	4 – Pique	Welsh–Ryan Arena (938); Evanston, IL
November 26, 2025*; 6:00 p.m., ESPN+		St. Bonaventure; CSU Invitational	W 75–71	5–1	23 – Maples	7 – 2 tied	3 – Leonard	Woodling Gym (294); Cleveland, OH
November 28, 2025*; 1:00 p.m., ESPN+		Valparaiso; CSU Invitational	W 80–41	6–1	14 – Rockwood	10 – Royal-Davis	5 – Leonard	Woodling Gym (306); Cleveland, OH
November 29, 2025*; 4:00 p.m., ESPN+		Radford; CSU Invitational	W 62–59 ^{OT}	7–1	21 – Zingaro	9 – Hurley	3 – 2 tied	Woodling Gym (334); Cleveland, OH
December 4, 2025; 7:00 p.m., ESPN+		at Detroit Mercy	L 68–76	7–2 (0–1)	25 – Maples	6 – Zingaro	3 – 3 tied	Calihan Hall (211); Detroit, MI
December 6, 2025; 12:00 p.m., ESPN+		at Oakland	W 72–55	8–2 (1–1)	23 – Leonard	11 – Fegan	2 – Maples	OU Credit Union O'rena (600); Rochester, MI
December 13, 2025*; 2:00 p.m., ESPN+		Niagara	W 84–52	9–2	19 – Maples	6 – Zingaro	4 – Maples	Wolstein Center (181); Cleveland, OH
December 16, 2025; 11:00 a.m., ESPN+		Northern Kentucky	W 74–56	10–2 (2–1)	17 – 2 tied	10 – Zingaro	7 – Leonard	Wolstein Center (2,504); Cleveland, OH
December 19, 2025*; 1:30 p.m.		vs. Charleston; Puerto Rico Clasico	W 67–61	11–2	16 – Zingaro	8 – Zingaro	4 – Leonard	Ruben Rodriguez Coliseum (100); Bayamón, Puerto Rico
December 21, 2025*; 10:30 a.m., YouTube		vs. Puerto Rico-Bayamón; Puerto Rico Clasico	W 82–45	12–2	25 – Leonard	8 – Pique	6 – Leonard	Ruben Rodriguez Coliseum (100); Bayamón, Puerto Rico
December 29, 2025; 4:00 p.m., ESPN+		Youngstown State	L 63–70	12–3 (2–2)	14 – 2 tied	8 – Pique	3 – 2 tied	Wolstein Center (404); Cleveland, OH
January 2, 2026; 7:00 p.m., ESPN+		at Green Bay	L 55–58	12–4 (2–3)	17 – Zingaro	7 – Zingaro	3 – 4 tied	Kress Center (2,300); Green Bay, WI
January 4, 2026; 3:00 p.m., ESPN+		at Milwaukee	L 58–66	12–5 (2–4)	23 – Zingaro	9 – Fegan	5 – Leonard	Klotsche Center (440); Milwaukee, WI
January 7, 2026; 7:00 p.m., ESPN+		Wright State	W 87–75	13–5 (3–4)	19 – Zingaro	10 – Fegan	6 – Fegan	Wolstein Center (432); Cleveland, OH
January 14, 2026; 7:00 p.m., ESPN+		Detroit Mercy	W 68–52	14–5 (4–4)	20 – Zingaro	10 – Fegan	4 – 3 tied	Wolstein Center (451); Cleveland, OH
January 18, 2026; 2:00 p.m., ESPN+		Robert Morris	W 68–61	15–5 (5–4)	15 – Maples	6 – 3 tied	4 – 2 tied	Wolstein Center (508); Cleveland, OH
January 21, 2026; 7:00 p.m., ESPN+		at Purdue Fort Wayne	L 70–80	15–6 (5–5)	22 – Zingaro	7 – Fegan	2 – 2 tied	Hilliard Gates Sports Center (535); Fort Wayne, IN
January 25, 2026; 1:00 p.m., ESPN+		at Youngstown State	L 38–61	15–7 (5–6)	14 – Leonard	9 – Hurley	3 – Fegan	Beeghly Center (30); Youngstown, OH
January 28, 2026; 7:00 p.m., ESPN+		Milwaukee	W 66–46	16–7 (6–6)	20 – Maples	11 – Zingaro	6 – Maples	Wolstein Center (465); Cleveland, OH
January 31, 2026; 1:00 p.m., ESPN+		at Northern Kentucky	W 69–61	17–7 (7–6)	25 – 2 tied	15 – Zingaro	4 – Fegan	Truist Arena (1,162); Highland Heights, KY
February 4, 2026; 6:30 p.m., ESPN+		at IU Indy	L 70–78	17–8 (7–7)	24 – Zingaro	11 – Zingaro	5 – Leonard	The Jungle (352); Indianapolis, IN
February 7, 2026; 2:00 p.m., ESPN+		Purdue Fort Wayne	W 73–56	18–8 (8–7)	27 – Maples	13 – Fegan	4 – Leonard	Wolstein Center (678); Cleveland, OH
February 11, 2026; 7:00 p.m., ESPN+		Green Bay	W 83–82 ^{OT}	19–8 (9–7)	26 – Maples	11 – Zingaro	4 – Fegan	Wolstein Center (456); Cleveland, OH
February 14, 2026; 2:00 p.m., ESPN+		at Robert Morris	W 57–52	20–8 (10–7)	17 – Maples	10 – Zingaro	4 – 3 tied	UPMC Events Center (412); Moon Township, PA
February 19, 2026; 7:00 p.m., ESPN+		IU Indy	W 74–45	21–8 (11–7)	18 – Maples	11 – Fegan	6 – Fegan	Wolstein Center (547); Cleveland, OH
February 25, 2026; 7:00 p.m., ESPN+		at Wright State	W 81–55	22–8 (12–7)	29 – Zingaro	9 – Fegan	5 – Fegan	Nutter Center (1,158); Fairborn, OH
February 28, 2026; 2:00 p.m., ESPN+		Oakland	W 73–59	23–8 (13–7)	26 – Zingaro	6 – Zingaro	6 – Leonard	Wolstein Center (613); Cleveland, OH
Horizon League tournament
March 4, 2026; 7:00 p.m., ESPN+	(3)	(8) Oakland; First Round	W 81–80 ^{OT}	24–8	29 – Zingaro	10 – Zingaro	5 – Fegan	Wolstein Center (501); Cleveland, OH
March 9, 2026; 2:30 p.m., ESPN+	(3)	vs. (2) Youngstown State; Semifinals	L 55–60	24–9	19 – Zingaro	14 – Zingaro	7 – Maples	Corteva Coliseum; Indianapolis, IN
WNIT
March 23, 2026*; 7:00 p.m., ESPN+		Monmouth; Second Round	W 74–68	25–9	39 – Maples	9 – Zingaro	4 – Maples	Wolstein Center (484); Cleveland, OH
March 26, 2026*; 7:30 p.m., ESPN+		at Middle Tennessee; Super 16	W 66–56	26–9	19 – Maples	8 – Fegan	3 – 2 tied	Murphy Center (3,986); Murfreesboro, TN
March 30, 2026*; 8:00 p.m., ESPN+		at Arkansas State; Great 8	L 53–71	26–10	15 – Maples	12 – Fegan	3 – 3 tied	First National Bank Arena (2,258); Jonesboro, AR
*Non-conference game. ^{#}Rankings from AP poll. (#) Tournament seedings in parentheses. All times are in Eastern.
