= 2025–26 Horizon League women's basketball season =

- League: NCAA Division I
- Sport: Women's basketball
- Teams: 11
- TV partner(s): ESPN+ ESPN2; ESPNU; ESPN

Regular season
- Season champions: Green Bay
- Runners-up: Youngstown State
- Season MVP: Jenna Guyer, Green Bay
- Top scorer: Izabella Zingaro, Cleveland State

Tournament
- Champions: Green Bay
- Runners-up: Youngstown State
- Finals MVP: Jenna Guyer, Green Bay

Basketball seasons
- ← 2024–25 2026–27 →

2025–26 Horizon League women's basketball standings
	Conf.				Overall
Team	W		L	PCT	W		L	PCT
Green Bay †	17	–	3	.850	25	–	9	.735
Youngstown State	15	–	5	.750	25	–	10	.714
Cleveland State	13	–	7	.650	26	–	10	.722
Northern Kentucky	12	–	8	.600	15	–	17	.469
Purdue Fort Wayne	12	–	8	.600	21	–	14	.600
Robert Morris	11	–	9	.550	18	–	12	.600
IU Indy	9	–	11	.450	14	–	17	.452
Oakland	7	–	13	.350	10	–	21	.323
Wright State	6	–	14	.300	10	–	22	.313
Milwaukee	4	–	16	.200	8	–	24	.250
Detroit Mercy	4	–	16	.200	7	–	24	.226
† 2026 Horizon League tournament winner

The 2025–26 Horizon League women's basketball season began with practices in September 2025 and ended with the 2026 Horizon League women's basketball tournament in March 2026. This was the 40th season for Horizon League women's basketball, and the final season before the conference expands with Northern Illinois rejoining beginning in 2026–27.

== Head coaches ==
=== Coaching changes ===
- After coaching the first 9 games of the 2023–24 season, Oakland head coach Jeff Tungate announced his immediate retirement on December 9, 2024, after undergoing numerous back and neck injuries, with associate head coach Deanna Richard being named interim head coach for the remainder of the season. On March 24, 2025, the Golden Grizzlies hired Lewis head coach Keisha Newell as their new head coach.
- On March 28, 2025, Western Michigan hired Detroit Mercy head coach Kate Achter. Detroit Mercy hired Kiefer Haffey as their new head coach on April 14, 2025.

=== Coaches ===
Team	Head coach	Previous job	Season	Overall record	Horizon record	NCAA Tournaments
Cleveland State	Chris Kielsmeier	Wayne State	8th	154–70 (.688)	87–45 (.659)	1
Detroit Mercy	Kiefer Haffey	Detroit Mercy (asst.)	1st	0–0 (–)	0–0 (–)	0
Green Bay	Kayla Karius	South Dakota	2nd	29–6 (.829)	19–1 (.950)	2
IU Indy	Kate Bruce	Walsh	4th	33–57 (.367)	26–34 (.433)	0
Milwaukee	Kyle Rechlicz	Wisconsin (asst.)	14th	189–213 (.470)	120–120 (.500)	0
Northern Kentucky	Jeff Hans	Thomas More	2nd	11–20 (.355)	8–12 (.400)	0
Oakland	Keisha Newell	Lewis (asst.)	1st	0–0 (–)	0–0 (–)	0
Purdue Fort Wayne	Maria Marchesano	Mount St. Mary's	5th	94–76 (.553)	59–42 (.584)	0
Robert Morris	Chandler McCabe	UCF (asst.)	2nd	14–15 (.483)	10–10 (.500)	0
Wright State	Kari Hoffman	Cedarville	5th	40–80 (.333)	27–50 (.351)	0
Youngstown State	Melissa Jackson	Cleveland State (asst.)	2nd	12–19 (.387)	7–13 (.350)	0

Notes:

- Season number includes 2025–26 season.
- Records are prior to 2025–26 season.

== Preseason ==
=== Preseason coaches poll ===
2025–26 Horizon League Preseason Coaches Poll
Place	Team	Votes
1	Green Bay	117 (8)
2	Robert Morris	97 (1)
3	Youngstown State	92 (1)
4	Cleveland State	87 (1)
5	Purdue Fort Wayne	79
6	Northern Kentucky	70
7	Detroit Mercy	59
8	Wright State	47
9	Milwaukee	29
10	IU Indy	27
11	Oakland	22
(#) first-place votes

=== Preseason All-Horizon League ===
First team	Second team
Colbi Maples, Cleveland State	Jenna Guyer, Green Bay
Aaliyah McQueen, Detroit Mercy	Kamy Peppler, Green Bay
Maddy Skorupski, Green Bay	Jordan Reid, Purdue Fort Wayne
Mya Meredith, Northern Kentucky	Noa Givon, Robert Morris
Sophia Gregory, Youngstown State	Aislin Malcolm, Robert Morris
Preseason Player of the Year: Colbi Maples, Cleveland State

== Regular season ==
=== Player of the Week awards ===
Week	Player of the Week	School	Freshman of the Week	School
1	Aislin Malcolm	Robert Morris	Sarah Baker	Youngstown State
2	Jordan Reid	Purdue Fort Wayne	Rylee Bess	Purdue Fort Wayne
3	Casey Santoro	Youngstown State	Karina Bystry	Northern Kentucky
4	Sophia Gregory	Youngstown State	Maddie Moody	Northern Kentucky
5	Alana Nelson	Purdue Fort Wayne	Layke Fields	Robert Morris
6	Alana Nelson (2)	Purdue Fort Wayne	Karina Bystry (2)	Northern Kentucky
7	Jada Leonard	Cleveland State	Danielle Cameron	Youngstown State
8	Jenna Guyer	Green Bay	Maddie Moody (2)	Northern Kentucky
9	Maddy Skorupski	Green Bay	Karina Bystry (3)	Northern Kentucky
10	Jenna Guyer (2)	Green Bay	Makenzie Luehring	Oakland
11	Alana Nelson (3)	Purdue Fort Wayne	Rylee Bess (2)	Purdue Fort Wayne
12	Colbi Maples	Cleveland State	Makenzie Luehring (2)	Oakland
13	Nevaeh Foster	IU Indy	Makenzie Luehring (3)	Oakland
14	Izabella Zingaro	Cleveland State	Karina Bystry (4)	Northern Kentucky
15	Sophia Gregory (2)	Youngstown State	Makenzie Luehring (4)	Oakland
16	Izabella Zingaro (2)	Cleveland State	Sarah Baker (2)	Youngstown State

School	POTW	FOTW
Cleveland State	4	0
Detroit Mercy	0	0
Green Bay	3	0
IU Indy	1	0
Milwaukee	0	0
Northern Kentucky	0	6
Oakland	0	4
Purdue Fort Wayne	4	2
Robert Morris	1	1
Wright State	0	0
Youngstown State	3	3

=== Conference matrix ===
	CSU	DET	GB	IUI	MKE	NKU	OAK	PFW	RMU	WSU	YSU
vs. Cleveland State	–	1–1	1–1	1–1	1–1	0–2	0–2	1–1	0–2	0–2	2–0
vs. Detroit Mercy	1–1	–	2–0	1–1	2–0	1–1	1–1	2–0	2–0	2–0	2–0
vs. Green Bay	1–1	0–2	–	0–2	0–2	1–1	0–2	1–1	0–2	0–2	0–2
vs. IU Indy	1–1	1–1	2–0	–	0–2	1–1	1–1	2–0	2–0	0–2	1–1
vs. Milwaukee	1–1	0–2	2–0	2–0	–	1–1	2–0	2–0	2–0	1–1	2–0
vs. Northern Kentucky	2–0	1–1	1–1	1–1	1–1	–	0–2	1–1	1–1	0–2	1–1
vs. Oakland	2–0	1–1	2–0	1–1	0–2	2–0	–	1–1	0–2	2–0	2–0
vs. Purdue Fort Wayne	1–1	0–2	1–1	0–2	0–2	1–1	1–1	–	1–1	1–1	2–0
vs. Robert Morris	2–0	0–2	2–0	0–2	0–2	1–1	2–0	1–1	–	0–2	1–1
vs. Wright State	2–0	0–2	2–0	2–0	1–1	2–0	0–2	1–1	2–0	–	2–0
vs. Youngstown State	0–2	0–2	2–0	1–1	0–2	1–1	0–2	0–2	1–1	0–2	–
Total	13–7	4–16	17–3	9–11	4–16	12–8	7–13	12–8	11–9	6–14	15–5

=== Early season tournaments ===
The following table summarizes the multiple-team events (MTE) or early-season tournaments in which teams from the Horizon League participated.

Team	Tournament	Location	Dates	Finish
Cleveland State	CSU Invitational	Cleveland, OH	November 26–29	N/A
Detroit Mercy	Tulane Holiday Tournament	New Orleans, LA	December 20–21	3rd
Green Bay	Cancun Challenge	Cancún, Mexico	November 27–29	N/A
Milwaukee	Tiger Turkey Tip-Off	Stockton, CA	November 28–29	N/A
Northern Kentucky	Music City Classic	Nashville, TN	November 25–26	N/A
Oakland	Raising The B.A.R. Invitational	Berkeley, CA	November 15–16	4th
Purdue Fort Wayne	Emerald Coast Classic	Destin, FL	November 24–25	3rd
Wright State	FAU Thanksgiving Classic	Boca Raton, FL	November 27–29	N/A
Youngstown State	FIU Christmas Classic	Miami, FL	December 19–20	N/A

== Postseason ==
=== Horizon League tournament ===
The conference tournament was played from March 2 to March 10, 2023. The tournament adopted a new format in 2026; instead of a traditional eleven-team single elimination bracket, the new format included reseeding after each round. The event started on campus sites with a play-in round for the bottom two teams (by conference record), followed by a ten-team first round. The five remaining teams then advanced to the final three rounds held at Corteva Coliseum in Indianapolis, Indiana. The bottom two teams by seeding play in the second round, while the other three teams are forwarded into the semifinals, with those winners advancing to the final.

Play-In Round; March 2 Campus Site; ESPN+
10	Milwaukee	67
11	Detroit Mercy	69

First Round; March 4 Campus Sites; ESPN+
1	Green Bay	81
11	Detroit Mercy	57
2	Youngstown State	76
9	Wright State	60
3	Cleveland State	81*
8	Oakland	80
4	Northern Kentucky	72
7	IU Indy	74
5	Purdue Fort Wayne	73
6	Robert Morris	43

Second Round; March 8 Indianapolis, IN; ESPN+
5	Purdue Fort Wayne	85
7	IU Indy	49

Semifinals; March 9 Indianapolis, IN; ESPNU/ESPN2
1	Green Bay	73
5	Purdue Fort Wayne	48
2	Youngstown State	60
3	Cleveland State	55

Final; March 10; Indianapolis, IN; ESPN
1	Green Bay	57
2	Youngstown State	49

* denotes overtime period

=== NCAA Tournament ===
As the conference tournament champion, Green Bay received the conference's automatic bid to the NCAA tournament.

Seed	Region	School	First Four	First round	Second round	Sweet Sixteen	Elite Eight	Final Four	Championship
13	Sacramento 2	Green Bay	Bye	L 58–75 vs. (4) Minnesota	DNP				

=== WNIT ===
Three Horizon League teams accepted bids to the Women's National Invitation Tournament.

School	First round	Second round	Super Sixteen	Great Eight	Fab Four	Championship
Cleveland State	Bye	W 74–68 vs. Monmouth	W 66–56 vs. Middle Tennessee	L 53–71 vs. Arkansas State	DNP	
Purdue Fort Wayne	Bye	W 77–72 vs. South Alabama	L 72–83 vs. Arkansas State	DNP		
Youngstown State	Bye	W 61–42 vs. Maryland Eastern Shore	L 46–72 vs. Marshall	DNP		

== Conference awards ==
**2026 Horizon League individual awards**
Award	Recipient(s)
Player of the Year	Jenna Guyer, Green Bay
Coach of the Year	Kayla Karius, Green Bay
Defensive Player of the Year	Sophia Gregory, Youngstown State
Sixth Player of the Year	Paulina Hernandez, Youngstown State
Freshman of the Year	Makenzie Luehring, Oakland
Newcomer of the Year	Izabella Zingaro, Cleveland State
Sportsmanship Award	Lauren Scott, Wright State

**2026 Horizon League all-conference teams**
First Team	Second Team	Third Team	Defensive Team	Freshman Team
Izabella Zingaro, CSU; Colbi Maples, CSU; Jenna Guyer, GB; Makenzie Luehring, OAK; Alana Nelson, PFW	Maddy Skorupski, GB; Karina Bystry, NKU; Breezie Williams, WSU; Casey Santoro, YSU; Sophia Gregory, YSU	Meghan Schultz, GB; Nevaeh Foster, IUI; Jorey Buwalda, MKE; Aislin Malcolm, RMU; Myriam Traore, RMU	Jada Leonard, CSU; Jenna Guyer, GB; Jordan Reid, PFW; Eva Levingston, RMU; Sophia Gregory, YSU	Maddie Moody, NKU; Karina Bystry, NKU; Makenzie Luehring, OAK; Rylee Bess, PFW; Sarah Baker, YSU

**2026 Horizon League**
**All-Tournament Team**
**Jenna Guyer, GB**
Maddy Skorupski, GB
Sophia Gregory, YSU
Casey Santoro, YSU
Izabella Zingaro, CSU
**Bold** denotes MVP

== Attendance ==
=== Average home attendances ===
Note: Figures include conference tournament

#	Team	GP	Cumulative	High	Low	Avg.
1	Green Bay	15	31,198	3,243	1,610	2,080
2	Wright State	14	23,494	6,192	996	1,678
3	Youngstown State	15	21,514	3,101	30	1,434
4	Northern Kentucky	14	20,737	3,147	892	1,481
5	Purdue Fort Wayne (Note: Statistics do not consider games with missing attendance data. Games played still counts all home games.)	16	13,451	2,383	457	897
6	Milwaukee	16	10,800	2,140	308	675
7	Cleveland State	18	9,671	2,504	181	537
8	Robert Morris	14	7,646	1,289	111	588
9	Detroit Mercy	15	6,146	1,105	203	410
10	IU Indy	15	6,060	523	246	404
11	Oakland	12	5,429	821	418	603
Total		164	156,146	6,192	30	981
