= 2025–26 Detroit Mercy Titans women's basketball team =

American college basketball season

2025–26 Detroit Mercy Titans women's basketball
- Conference: Horizon League
- Record: 7–24 (4–16 Horizon)
- Head coach: Kiefer Haffey (1st season)
- Assistant coaches: Juanita Cochran; Antonio Capaldi; Kevin Mondro; Kayla Bridges; Tania Davis
- Home arena: Calihan Hall

2025–26 Horizon League women's basketball standings
	Conf.				Overall
Team	W		L	PCT	W		L	PCT
Green Bay †	17	–	3	.850	25	–	9	.735
Youngstown State	15	–	5	.750	25	–	10	.714
Cleveland State	13	–	7	.650	26	–	10	.722
Northern Kentucky	12	–	8	.600	15	–	17	.469
Purdue Fort Wayne	12	–	8	.600	21	–	14	.600
Robert Morris	11	–	9	.550	18	–	12	.600
IU Indy	9	–	11	.450	14	–	17	.452
Oakland	7	–	13	.350	10	–	21	.323
Wright State	6	–	14	.300	10	–	22	.313
Milwaukee	4	–	16	.200	8	–	24	.250
Detroit Mercy	4	–	16	.200	7	–	24	.226
† 2026 Horizon League tournament winner

The 2025–26 Detroit Mercy Titans women's basketball team represented the University of Detroit Mercy during the 2025–26 NCAA Division I women's basketball season. The Titans, led by first-year head coach Kiefer Haffey, played their home games at Calihan Hall in Detroit, Michigan as members of the Horizon League.

== Previous season ==
The Titans finished the 2024–25 season 15–15, 8–12 in Horizon League play, to finish tied for fifth place. They defeated Milwaukee before falling to Cleveland State in the quarterfinals of the Horizon League tournament.

== Preseason ==
On October 9, 2025, the Horizon League released their preseason poll and league teams. Detroit Mercy was picked to finish seventh in the conference. One player was named to the preseason All-Horizon League First Team.

=== Preseason rankings ===
Horizon League Preseason Coaches Poll
Place	Team	Votes
1	Green Bay	117 (8)
2	Robert Morris	97 (1)
3	Youngstown State	92 (1)
4	Cleveland State	87 (1)
5	Purdue Fort Wayne	79
6	Northern Kentucky	70
7	Detroit Mercy	59
8	Wright State	47
9	Milwaukee	29
10	IU Indy	27
11	Oakland	22
(#) first-place votes

=== Preseason All-Horizon League Teams ===
Preseason All-Horizon League Teams
Team	Player	Position	Year
First	Aaliyah McQueen	Guard	Graduate student

== Roster ==
2025–26 Detroit Mercy Titans women's basketball team
Players
Coaches

Pos.	#	Name	Height	Year	Previous school	Hometown
G	0	Nisea Burrell	5 ft 5 in (1.65 m)	GS	Austin Peay	Philadelphia, Pennsylvania
G	1	Aaliyah McQueen	5 ft 9 in (1.75 m)	GS	Madonna	Flint, Michigan
G	2	Makayla Jackson	5 ft 8 in (1.73 m)	Jr	Bullis School	Alexandria, Virginia
F	3	Anna Lassan	5 ft 11 in (1.8 m)	So	South Lyon East High School	South Lyon, Michigan
G	4	Myonna Hooper	5 ft 5 in (1.65 m)	Sr	West Bloomfield High School	West Bloomfield, Michigan
G	5	Maya Anderson	5 ft 8 in (1.73 m)	So	Cass Tech	Detroit, Michigan
G	11	Kailee Davis	5 ft 2 in (1.57 m)	GS	Northern Kentucky	Detroit, Michigan
G	12	Amaya Burch	5 ft 9 in (1.75 m)	Jr	Timber Creek Regional High School	Sicklerville, New Jersey
G/F	13	Brendha Schwartz	5 ft 11 in (1.8 m)	Jr	Colegio Estadual Tres Fronteiras	Foz do Iguaçu, Brazil
G/F	14	Allison Basye	5 ft 11 in (1.8 m)	Sr	Northern Kentucky	Chillicothe, Ohio
F	15	Naïma Diawara	6 ft 0 in (1.83 m)	Fr	Dawson College	Montreal, Canada
G/F	21	Rayven McQueen	6 ft 0 in (1.83 m)	Fr	Grand Blanc High School	Flint, Michigan
F/C	22	Cameron McMaster	6 ft 3 in (1.91 m)	Fr	Orangeville Prep	Calgary, Alberta
F/C	23	Jasmine Edwards	6 ft 0 in (1.83 m)	GS	Warner	Westland, Michigan
C	41	Addisen Mastriano	6 ft 3 in (1.91 m)	So	Northeastern	Richmond, Indiana

Head coach

- Kiefer Haffey (Wayne State)

Assistant coach(es)

- Juanita Cochran (Wayne State)
- Antonio Capaldi (Madonna)
- Kevin Mondro (Detroit Mercy)
- Kayla Bridges (Wayne State)
- Tania Davis (Clemson)

Legend

- (C) Team captain
- (S) Suspended
- (I) Ineligible
- (W) Walk-on
- Injured
- Current redshirt

Roster
Last update: June 10, 2026

== Schedule and results ==
Date time, TV	Rank^{#}	Opponent^{#}	Result	Record	High points	High rebounds	High assists	Site (attendance) city, state
Exhibition
November 3, 2025*		Lawrence Tech						Calihan Hall; Detroit, MI
Regular season
November 8, 2025*; 1:00 pm, ESPN+		Valparaiso	W 78–48	1–0	19 – Edwards	16 – McQueen	3 – Hooper	Calihan Hall (300); Detroit, MI
November 16, 2025*; 2:00 pm, ESPN+		at Toledo	L 52–66	1–1	16 – Edwards	6 – Edwards	3 – Anderson	John F. Savage Arena (3,685); Toledo, OH
November 19, 2025*; 7:00 pm, ESPN+		Central Michigan	L 54–87	1–2	18 – Edwards	8 – Edwards	4 – Burrell	Calihan Hall (461); Detroit, MI
November 23, 2025*; 3:00 pm, B1G+		at Wisconsin	L 63–81	1–3	14 – Jackson	6 – Diawara	2 – 3 tied	Kohl Center (2,594); Madison, WI
November 26, 2025*; 5:00 pm, ESPN+		No. 6 Michigan	L 53–102	1–4	13 – Burrell	5 – 2 tied	4 – McQueen	Calihan Hall (867); Detroit, MI
November 30, 2025*; 1:00 pm, ESPN+		Eastern Michigan	L 55–64	1–5	15 – Burrell	7 – McQueen	3 – Lassan	Calihan Hall (256); Detroit, MI
December 4, 2025; 7:00 pm, ESPN+		Cleveland State	W 76–68	2–5 (1–0)	12 – Mastriano	9 – Edwards	3 – 2 tied	Calihan Hall (211); Detroit, MI
December 7, 2025; 1:00 pm, ESPN+		IU Indy	W 74–69	3–5 (2–0)	16 – 2 tied	7 – Jackson	3 – 2 tied	Calihan Hall (203); Detroit, MI
December 16, 2025; 6:00 pm, ESPN+		at Robert Morris	L 52–60	3–6 (2–1)	13 – Hooper	6 – Edwards	3 – Burrell	UPMC Events Center (357); Moon Township, PA
December 20, 2025*; 3:30 pm		at Mercer; Tulane Holiday Tournament	L 55–64	3–7	13 – 2 tied	10 – Edwards	5 – McQueen	Devlin Fieldhouse (691); New Orleans, LA
December 21, 2025*; 12:00 pm		at Delaware State; Tulane Holiday Tournament	W 59–46	4–7	14 – McQueen	10 – McQueen	3 – 2 tied	Devlin Fieldhouse (535); New Orleans, LA
December 29, 2025*; 1:00 pm, ESPN+		Rochester Christian	L 80–86	4–8	23 – Jackson	15 – Edwards	8 – Hooper	Calihan Hall (211); Detroit, MI
January 2, 2026; 7:00 pm, ESPN+		at Wright State	L 71–82	4–9 (2–2)	21 – Edwards	9 – Burrell	2 – 3 tied	Nutter Center (1,119); Fairborn, OH
January 4, 2026; 1:00 pm, ESPN+		at Northern Kentucky	L 57–75	4–10 (2–3)	13 – Burrell	7 – Edwards	2 – 2 tied	Truist Center (1,766); Highland Heights, KY
January 8, 2026; 7:00 pm, ESPN+		Milwaukee	L 61–74	4–11 (2–4)	18 – McQueen	14 – Edwards	4 – Burrell	Calihan Hall (297); Detroit, MI
January 10, 2026; 1:00 pm, ESPN+		Green Bay	L 53–74	4–12 (2–5)	12 – Edwards	12 – Edwards	3 – Burrell	Calihan Hall (305); Detroit, MI
January 14, 2026; 7:00 pm, ESPN+		at Cleveland State	L 52–68	4–13 (2–6)	15 – Hooper	10 – Edwards	3 – Burrell	Wolstein Center (451); Cleveland, OH
January 18, 2026; 1:00 pm, ESPN+		Oakland; Metro Series	L 70–80	4–14 (2–7)	22 – Hooper	10 – Edwards	3 – Edwards	Calihan Hall (444); Detroit, MI
January 22, 2026; 7:00 pm, ESPN+		at Milwaukee	L 68–76	4–15 (2–8)	21 – Jackson	8 – 2 tied	2 – 2 tied	Klotsche Center (308); Milwaukee, WI
January 24, 2026; 2:00 pm, ESPN+		at Green Bay	L 61–72	4–16 (2–9)	14 – Burrell	11 – Edwards	4 – Jackson	Kress Events Center (2,016); Green Bay, WI
January 29, 2026; 7:00 pm, ESPN+		Youngstown State	L 53–69	4–17 (2–10)	15 – Davis	5 – 3 tied	1 – 5 tied	Calihan Hall (315); Detroit, MI
February 1, 2026; 2:00 pm, ESPN+		at Purdue Fort Wayne	L 66–95	4–18 (2–11)	12 – Davis	4 – 2 tied	3 – Hooper	Hilliard Gates Sports Center (652); Fort Wayne, IN
February 7, 2026; 1:00 pm, ESPN+		at Oakland; Metro Series	W 72–69	5–18 (3–11)	20 – Davis	14 – Edwards	5 – Hooper	OU Credit Union O'rena (538); Auburn Hills, MI
February 12, 2026; 7:00 pm, ESPN+		Wright State	L 61–78	5–19 (3–12)	22 – Edwards	14 – Edwards	3 – 2 tied	Calihan Hall (300); Detroit, MI
February 14, 2026; 1:00 pm, ESPN+		Purdue Fort Wayne	L 68–84	5–20 (3–13)	22 – Jackson	6 – Edwards	5 – Davis	Calihan Hall (455); Detroit, MI
February 19, 2026; 7:00 pm, ESPN+		Robert Morris	L 55–66	5–21 (3–14)	13 – Jackson	8 – Edwards	2 – 3 tied	Calihan Hall (416); Detroit, MI
February 22, 2026; 1:00 pm, ESPN+		at IU Indy	L 72–74	5–22 (3–15)	13 – Mastriano	10 – Edwards	4 – Burrell	The Jungle (523); Indianapolis, IN
February 25, 2026; 6:30 pm, ESPN+		at Youngstown State	L 60–72	5–23 (3–16)	13 – McQueen	12 – Edwards	3 – Davis	Beeghly Center (1,426); Youngstown, OH
February 28, 2026; 1:00 pm, ESPN+		Northern Kentucky	W 70–69	6–23 (4–16)	24 – Edwards	8 – Hooper	4 – 2 tied	Calihan Hall (1,105); Detroit, MI
Horizon League tournament
March 2, 2026; 8:00 pm, ESPN+	(11)	at (10) Milwaukee; Play-In Game	W 69–67	7–23	17 – 2 tied	8 – McQueen	5 – Jackson	Klotsche Center (462); Milwaukee, WI
March 4, 2026; 8:00 pm, ESPN+	(11)	at (1) Green Bay; First Round	L 57–81	7–24	17 – Edwards	12 – Edwards	5 – Burrell	Kress Events Center (1,916); Green Bay, WI
*Non-conference game. ^{#}Rankings from AP poll. (#) Tournament seedings in parentheses. All times are in Eastern.
