= 2025–26 Northern Kentucky Norse women's basketball team =

American college basketball season

2025–26 Northern Kentucky Norse women's basketball
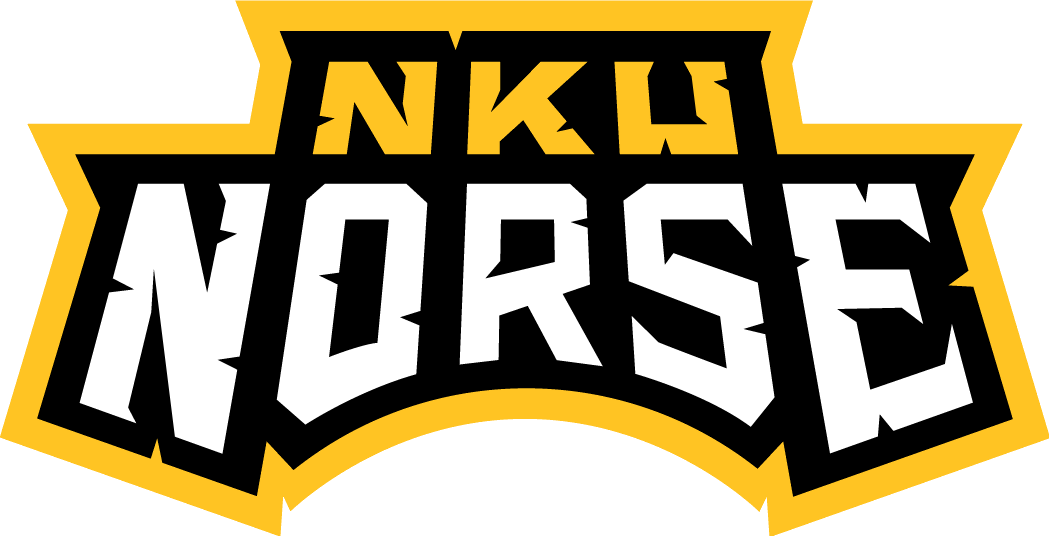
- Conference: Horizon League
- Record: 15–17 (12–8 Horizon)
- Head coach: Jeff Hans (2nd season)
- Assistant coaches: Molly Bateman; Gabby Johnson; Brenden Stowers
- Home arena: Truist Arena

2025–26 Horizon League women's basketball standings
	Conf.				Overall
Team	W		L	PCT	W		L	PCT
Green Bay †	17	–	3	.850	25	–	9	.735
Youngstown State	15	–	5	.750	25	–	10	.714
Cleveland State	13	–	7	.650	26	–	10	.722
Northern Kentucky	12	–	8	.600	15	–	17	.469
Purdue Fort Wayne	12	–	8	.600	21	–	14	.600
Robert Morris	11	–	9	.550	18	–	12	.600
IU Indy	9	–	11	.450	14	–	17	.452
Oakland	7	–	13	.350	10	–	21	.323
Wright State	6	–	14	.300	10	–	22	.313
Milwaukee	4	–	16	.200	8	–	24	.250
Detroit Mercy	4	–	16	.200	7	–	24	.226
† 2026 Horizon League tournament winner

The 2025–26 Northern Kentucky Norse women's basketball team represented Northern Kentucky University during the 2025–26 NCAA Division I women's basketball season. The Norse, led by second-year head coach Jeff Hans, played their home games at Truist Arena in Highland Heights, Kentucky as members of the Horizon League.

== Previous season ==
The Norse finished the 2024–25 season 11–20, 8–12 in Horizon League play, to finish in a tie for fifth place. They were defeated by Robert Morris in the quarterfinals of the Horizon League tournament.

== Preseason ==
On October 9, 2025, the Horizon League released their preseason poll and league teams. Northern Kentucky was picked to finish sixth in the conference. One player was named to the preseason All-Horizon League First Team.

=== Preseason rankings ===
Horizon League Preseason Coaches Poll
Place	Team	Votes
1	Green Bay	117 (8)
2	Robert Morris	97 (1)
3	Youngstown State	92 (1)
4	Cleveland State	87 (1)
5	Purdue Fort Wayne	79
6	Northern Kentucky	70
7	Detroit Mercy	59
8	Wright State	47
9	Milwaukee	29
10	IU Indy	27
11	Oakland	22
(#) first-place votes

=== Preseason All-Horizon League Teams ===
Preseason All-Horizon League Teams
Team	Player	Position	Year
First	Mya Meredith	Guard	Senior

== Roster ==
2024–25 Northern Kentucky Norse women's basketball team
Players
Coaches

Pos.	#	Name	Height	Year	Previous school	Hometown
G	1	Kamora Morgan	6 ft 0 in (1.83 m)	So	Fort Erie International Academy	Oshawa, Ontario
G	2	Kylee Hunt	5 ft 6 in (1.68 m)	RS Jr	Seward County CC	Oklahoma City, OK
G	4	Taysha Rushton	5 ft 5 in (1.65 m)	GS	UT Permian Basin	Midland, TX
G	5	Mya Meredith (5Y)	5 ft 11 in (1.8 m)	Sr	Western Kentucky	Newport, KY
G	7	Alma Rashelbach	6 ft 0 in (1.83 m)	Jr	Nebraska–Kearney	Tel Mond, Israel
F	9	Mia Jordan	6 ft 3 in (1.91 m)	Jr	Dodge City CC	Gold Coast, Australia
G	12	Anna Hamilton	5 ft 5 in (1.65 m)	So	Conner High School	Hebron, KY
F	14	Abby Wolterman	6 ft 0 in (1.83 m)	Sr	IU Indy	West Chester, OH
G	15	Carolina Eaglin	5 ft 9 in (1.75 m)	Fr	Newport Central Catholic High School	Newport, KY
G	20	Karina Bystry	5 ft 9 in (1.75 m)	Fr	McMinn Central High School	Englewood, TN
G	22	Noelle Hubert	5 ft 11 in (1.8 m)	Jr	Notre Dame Academy	Burlington, KY
F	30	Maddie Moody	6 ft 1 in (1.85 m)	Fr	Archbishop Alter High School	Kettering, OH
F	32	Jamaya Thomas	6 ft 1 in (1.85 m)	Fr	Lawrence North High School	Indianapolis, IN
F	33	Gabby Razzano	6 ft 2 in (1.88 m)	Jr	Mason High School	Mason, OH

Head coach

- Jeff Hans (Wilmington (OH))

Assistant coach(es)

- Molly Bateman (Defiance)
- Gabby Johnson (Thomas More)
- Brenden Stowers (Northern Kentucky)

Legend

- (C) Team captain
- (S) Suspended
- (I) Ineligible
- (W) Walk-on
- (5Y) Fifth-year senior
- Injured
- Current redshirt

Roster
Last update: April 1, 2026

== Schedule and results ==
Date time, TV	Rank^{#}	Opponent^{#}	Result	Record	High points	High rebounds	High assists	Site (attendance) city, state
Exhibition
October 30, 2024*; 6:00 p.m.		Wilmington	W 86–27	–	–	–	–	Truist Arena; Highland Heights, KY
Regular season
November 6, 2025*; 6:00 p.m., ESPN+		at Marshall	L 53–68	0–1	11 – Rushton	7 – Moody	4 – Meredith	Cam Henderson Center (1,046); Huntington, WV
November 9, 2025*; 2:00 p.m., ACCNX		at No. 20 Louisville	L 61–89	0–2	13 – Morgan	6 – Rushton	3 – 2 tied	KFC Yum! Center (7,182); Louisville, KY
November 12, 2025*; 6:30 p.m., ESPN+		at Ball State	L 64–95	0–3	18 – Meredith	6 – 2 tied	2 – Morgan	Worthen Arena (1,395); Muncie, IN
November 16, 2025*; 5:00 p.m., ESPN+		at Butler	L 56–73	0–4	15 – Bystry	6 – Jordan	2 – 2 tied	Hinkle Fieldhouse (1,111); Indianapolis, IN
November 19, 2025*; 11:00 a.m., ESPN+		Toledo	W 70–61	1–4	18 – Bystry	6 – Moody	2 – 2 tied	Truist Arena (3,147); Highland Heights, KY
November 22, 2025*; 2:00 p.m., ESPN+		at Chattanooga	L 62–64	1–5	21 – Bystry	5 – 2 tied	3 – Rushton	McKenzie Arena (1,765); Chattanooga, TN
November 25, 2025*; 12:00 p.m., BallerTV		vs. Stetson; Music City Classic	L 63–89	1–6	16 – Moody	12 – Jordan	4 – Rushton	Trevecca Trojan Fieldhouse (221); Nashville, TN
November 26, 2025*; 2:15 p.m., BallerTV		vs. Drake; Music City Classic	W 90–69	2–6	17 – Bystry	5 – Wolterman	3 – Hubert	Trevecca Trojan Fieldhouse (252); Nashville, TN
November 30, 2025*; 1:00 p.m., ESPN+		Southern Indiana	W 77–71 ^{OT}	3–6	20 – Rushton	12 – Moody	5 – Meredith	Truist Arena (1,112); Highland Heights, KY
December 4, 2025; 6:00 p.m., ESPN+		Green Bay	L 60–70	3–7 (0–1)	11 – 3 tied	7 – Moody	2 – 2 tied	Truist Arena (939); Highland Heights, KY
December 7, 2025; 1:00 p.m., ESPN+		Robert Morris	L 58–60	3–8 (0–2)	14 – Rushton	9 – Moody	2 – 2 tied	Truist Arena (1,322); Highland Heights, KY
December 11, 2025*; 6:30 p.m., B1G+		at No. 21 Ohio State	L 62–94	3–9	21 – Bystry	7 – Jordan	4 – Bystry	Value City Arena (4,672); Columbus, OH
December 16, 2025; 11:00 a.m., ESPN+		at Cleveland State	L 56–74	3–10 (0–3)	20 – Bystry	9 – Moody	3 – Rushton	Wolstein Center (2,504); Cleveland, OH
December 21, 2025*; 2:30 p.m., ESPN+		Bradley	L 61–62	3–11	17 – Moody	11 – Wolterman	2 – 2 tied	Truist Arena (2,801); Highland Heights, KY
December 29, 2025; 7:00 p.m., ESPN+		at Purdue Fort Wayne	W 88–85 ^{OT}	4–11 (1–3)	25 – Bystry	7 – 2 tied	3 – Meredith	Hilliard Gates Sports Center (582); Fort Wayne, IN
January 2, 2026; 6:00 p.m., ESPN+		IU Indy	W 63–44	5–11 (2–3)	16 – Bystry	15 – Moody	4 – Moody	Truist Arena (1,086); Highland Heights, KY
January 4, 2026; 1:00 p.m., ESPN+		Detroit Mercy	W 75–57	6–11 (3–3)	19 – Moody	10 – Wolterman	4 – 2 tied	Truist Arena (1,766); Highland Heights, KY
January 8, 2026; 7:17 p.m., ESPN+		at Youngstown State	W 61–49	7–11 (4–3)	17 – Moody	11 – Wolterman	5 – Meredith	Beeghly Center (1,400); Youngstown, OH
January 10, 2026; 11:00 a.m., ESPN+		at Robert Morris	W 81–76	8–11 (5–3)	24 – Bystry	10 – Moody	4 – Bystry	UPMC Events Center (213); Moon Township, PA
January 14, 2026; 6:00 p.m., ESPN+		Milwaukee	W 63–55	9–11 (6–3)	20 – Bystry	10 – 2 tied	1 – 3 tied	Truist Arena (1,507); Highland Heights, KY
January 17, 2026; 2:00 p.m., ESPN+		at Wright State	W 82–56	10–11 (7–3)	17 – Rushton	13 – Moody	6 – Rushton	Nutter Center (1,101); Fairborn, OH
January 21, 2026; 6:30 p.m., ESPN+		at IU Indy	L 70–75	10–12 (7–4)	19 – Moody	11 – Wolterman	6 – Meredith	Corteva Coliseum (437); Indianapolis, IN
January 24, 2026; 1:00 p.m., ESPN+		Purdue Fort Wayne	L 91–97 ^{OT}	10–13 (7–5)	35 – Bystry	8 – Moody	3 – Bystry	Truist Arena (1,142); Highland Heights, KY
January 31, 2026; 1:00 p.m., ESPN+		Cleveland State	L 61–69	10–14 (7–6)	17 – Meredith	8 – Wolterman	2 – 2 tied	Truist Arena (1,162); Highland Heights, KY
February 3, 2026; 6:00 p.m., ESPN+		Oakland	W 77–76	11–14 (8–6)	19 – Bystry	9 – Wolterman	3 – Meredith	Truist Arena (1,216); Highland Heights, KY
February 12, 2026; 12:00 p.m., ESPN+		at Milwaukee	W 59–56	12–14 (9–6)	18 – Meredith	10 – Wolterman	4 – Rushton	Klotsche Center (2,140); Milwaukee, WI
February 14, 2026; 2:00 p.m., ESPN+		at Green Bay	W 77–59	13–14 (10–6)	21 – Rushton	7 – 2 tied	4 – Rushton	Kress Events Center (2,371); Green Bay, WI
February 19, 2026; 6:00 p.m., ESPN+		Youngstown State	L 55–75	13–15 (10–7)	18 – Bystry	6 – Wolterman	2 – 2 tied	Truist Arena (1,263); Highland Heights, KY
February 21, 2026; 1:00 p.m., ESPN+/FDSNOH		Wright State	W 68–62	14–15 (11–7)	19 – Wolterman	10 – Wolterman	3 – 3 tied	Truist Arena (1,382); Highland Heights, KY
February 25, 2026; 6:30 p.m., ESPN+		at Oakland	W 84–59	15–15 (12–7)	21 – Bystry	8 – Moody	5 – Rushton	OU Credit Union O'rena (450); Rochester, MI
February 28, 2026; 1:00 p.m., ESPN+		at Detroit Mercy	L 69–70	15–16 (12–8)	21 – Bystry	9 – Wolterman	4 – Meredith	Calihan Hall (1,105); Detroit, MI
Horizon League tournament
March 4, 2026; 7:00 p.m., ESPN+	(4)	(7) IU Indy; First Round	L 72–74	15–17	16 – Meredith	8 – Meredith	6 – Bystry	Truist Arena (892); Highland Heights, KY
*Non-conference game. ^{#}Rankings from AP Poll. (#) Tournament seedings in parentheses. All times are in Eastern.
