= 2025–26 Oakland Golden Grizzlies women's basketball team =

American college basketball season

2025–26 Oakland Golden Grizzlies women's basketball
- Conference: Horizon League
- Head coach: Keisha Newell (1st season)
- Assistant coaches: Missa Anderson; Jonathan Hill; Josh Lees
- Home arena: OU Credit Union O'rena

2025–26 Horizon League women's basketball standings
| | Conf. | | | | Overall |
| Team | W | | L | PCT | W | | L | PCT |
|---|---|---|---|---|---|---|---|---|
| Green Bay † | 17 | – | 3 | .850 | 25 | – | 9 | .735 |
| Youngstown State | 15 | – | 5 | .750 | 25 | – | 10 | .714 |
| Cleveland State | 13 | – | 7 | .650 | 26 | – | 10 | .722 |
| Northern Kentucky | 12 | – | 8 | .600 | 15 | – | 17 | .469 |
| Purdue Fort Wayne | 12 | – | 8 | .600 | 21 | – | 14 | .600 |
| Robert Morris | 11 | – | 9 | .550 | 18 | – | 12 | .600 |
| IU Indy | 9 | – | 11 | .450 | 14 | – | 17 | .452 |
| Oakland | 7 | – | 13 | .350 | 10 | – | 21 | .323 |
| Wright State | 6 | – | 14 | .300 | 10 | – | 22 | .313 |
| Milwaukee | 4 | – | 16 | .200 | 8 | – | 24 | .250 |
| Detroit Mercy | 4 | – | 16 | .200 | 7 | – | 24 | .226 |
† 2026 Horizon League tournament winner

The 2025–26 Oakland Golden Grizzlies women's basketball team represented Oakland University during the 2025–26 NCAA Division I women's basketball season. The Golden Grizzlies, led by head coach Keisha Newell, played their home games at the OU Credit Union O'rena in Auburn Hills, Michigan as members of the Horizon League.

== Previous season ==
The Golden Grizzlies finished the 2024–25 season 9–22, 6–14 in Horizon League play, to finish in tenth place. They defeated IU Indy before falling to Green Bay in the quarterfinals of the Horizon League tournament.

== Preseason ==
On October 9, 2025, the Horizon League released their preseason poll and league teams. Oakland was picked to finish last in the conference. No players were named to the preseason All-Horizon League First or Second Teams.

=== Preseason rankings ===
Horizon League Preseason Coaches Poll
| Place | Team | Votes |
|---|---|---|
| 1 | Green Bay | 117 (8) |
| 2 | Robert Morris | 97 (1) |
| 3 | Youngstown State | 92 (1) |
| 4 | Cleveland State | 87 (1) |
| 5 | Purdue Fort Wayne | 79 |
| 6 | Northern Kentucky | 70 |
| 7 | Detroit Mercy | 59 |
| 8 | Wright State | 47 |
| 9 | Milwaukee | 29 |
| 10 | IU Indy | 27 |
| 11 | Oakland | 22 |
(#) first-place votes

== Roster ==
2025–26 Oakland Golden Grizzlies women's basketball team
Players
Coaches

| Pos. | # | Name | Height | Year | Previous school | Hometown |
|---|---|---|---|---|---|---|
| G | 0 | Kyra Lawrence | 5 ft 11 in (1.8 m) | Sr | Delaware State | Farmington Hills, Michigan |
| G | 1 | Jasmine Dupree-Hebert | 5 ft 8 in (1.73 m) | Jr | Hopkins High School | Minneapolis, Minnesota |
| G | 2 | Makenzie Luehring | 5 ft 6 in (1.68 m) | Fr | Kettle Moraine Lutheran High School | Jackson, Wisconsin |
| G/F | 3 | Layla Gold | 5 ft 11 in (1.8 m) | Jr | Valparaiso | Indianapolis, Indiana |
| C | 4 | Sereniti Roberts-Adams | 6 ft 3 in (1.91 m) | Fr | Butler College Prep | Chicago, Illinois |
| G | 11 | Aalyssa Rogers | 5 ft 6 in (1.68 m) | Sr | Virginia University of Lynchburg | Houston, Texas |
| F | 12 | Ilris Aworet | 6 ft 0 in (1.83 m) | Jr | Frank Phillips College | Port-Gentil |
| G | 22 | Cali Denson | 5 ft 8 in (1.73 m) | RS So | Eastern Michigan | Milwaukie, Oregon |
| G | 23 | Filippa Goula | 5 ft 7 in (1.7 m) | GS | Cleveland State | Ano Liosia, Greece |
| F/C | 24 | Lianna Baxter | 6 ft 2 in (1.88 m) | RS Sr | Oconto High School | Marinette, Wisconsin |
| G | 25 | Angie Smith | 5 ft 8 in (1.73 m) | So | DePaul | Bolingbrook, Illinois |
| F | 32 | Karinna Trotter | 6 ft 2 in (1.88 m) | Fr | Divine Savior Holy Angels High School | Milwaukee, Wisconsin |
| F | 33 | Kimber Abshear | 6 ft 3 in (1.91 m) | Fr | Wapahani High School | Farmland, Indiana |

Head coach

- Keisha Newell (Loyola Chicago)

Assistant coach(es)

- Missa Anderson (Trinity International)
- Jonathan Hill (Southern New Hampshire)
- Josh Lees (Rochester Christian)

Legend

- (C) Team captain
- (S) Suspended
- (I) Ineligible
- (W) Walk-on
- Injured
- Current redshirt

Roster
Last update: June 4, 2026

== Schedule and results ==
| Date time, TV | Rank^{#} | Opponent^{#} | Result | Record | High points | High rebounds | High assists | Site (attendance) city, state |
Exhibition
| October 28, 2025*; 6:00 pm | | Davenport | W 71–64 | – | 17 – Luehring | 9 – Gold | 4 – 2 tied | OU Credit Union O'rena (513); Auburn Hills, MI |
Regular season
| November 3, 2025*; 11:00 am, ESPN+ | | Cleary | W 90–32 | 1–0 | 21 – Denson | 8 – Goula | 6 – Smith | OU Credit Union O'rena; Auburn Hills, MI |
| November 5, 2025*; 7:30 pm, B1G+ | | at Wisconsin | L 68–79 | 1–1 | 17 – Denson | 6 – 3 tied | 8 – Goula | Kohl Center (2,430); Madison, WI |
| November 10, 2025*; 6:30 pm, ESPN+ | | Miami (OH) | W 80–75 | 2–1 | 21 – Gold | 13 – Gold | 4 – 2 tied | OU Credit Union O'rena (418); Auburn Hills, MI |
| November 15, 2025*; 8:30 pm, ESPN+ | | vs. Harvard; Raising the B.A.R. Invitational | L 55–93 | 2–2 | 11 – 2 tied | 6 – Trotter | 2 – Luehring | Haas Pavilion (137); Berkeley, CA |
| November 16, 2025*; 8:00 pm, ESPN+ | | vs. Charlotte; Raising the B.A.R. Invitational | L 41–66 | 2–3 | 13 – Goula | 7 – Luehring | 4 – Luehring | Haas Pavilion; Berkeley, CA |
| November 23, 2025*; 2:00 pm, B1G+ | | at No. 22 Michigan State | L 41–102 | 2–4 | 13 – Gold | 6 – Gold | 4 – Luehring | Breslin Center (4,251); East Lansing, MI |
| November 26, 2025*; 2:00 pm, Summit League Network | | at St. Thomas (MN) | W 68–52 | 3–4 | 21 – Denson | 12 – Roberts-Adams | 7 – Goula | Lee & Penny Anderson Arena (263); St. Paul, MN |
| December 3, 2025; 7:00 pm, ESPN+ | | at Wright State | L 57–61 | 3–5 (0–1) | 18 – Baxter | 7 – 3 tied | 5 – Smith | Nutter Center (996); Fairborn, OH |
| December 6, 2025; 12:00 pm, ESPN+ | | Cleveland State | L 55–72 | 3–6 (0–2) | 14 – Denson | 5 – Gold | 4 – Luehring | OU Credit Union O'rena (600); Auburn Hills, MI |
| December 15, 2025*; 12:00 pm, ESPN+ | | at Loyola Chicago | L 56–59 | 3–7 | 12 – 2 tied | 7 – 2 tied | 4 – Luehring | Gentile Arena (3,825); Chicago, IL |
| December 19, 2025*; 7:30 pm, ESPN+ | | at Illinois State | L 66–89 | 3–8 | 18 – Smith | 5 – Luehring | 3 – Luehring | CEFCU Arena (1,682); Normal, IL |
| December 21, 2025*; 12:00 pm, B1G+ | | at No. 6 Michigan | L 54–97 | 3–9 | 14 – Baxter | 8 – Smith | 3 – Goula | Crisler Center (4,752); Ann Arbor, MI |
| December 29, 2025; 4:00 pm, ESPN+ | | at Robert Morris | W 61–58 | 4–9 (1–2) | 17 – Luehring | 7 – Gold | 8 – Luehring | UPMC Events Center (428); Moon Township, PA |
| January 2, 2026; 6:30 pm, ESPN+ | | Purdue Fort Wayne | L 64–84 | 4–10 (1–3) | 15 – Baxter | 6 – 2 tied | 5 – Luehring | OU Credit Union O'rena (653); Auburn Hills, MI |
| January 5, 2026; 6:30 pm, ESPN+ | | at Youngstown State | L 58–81 | 4–11 (1–4) | 20 – Luehring | 10 – 2 tied | 4 – Goula | Beeghly Center (1,141); Youngstown, OH |
| January 8, 2026; 6:30 pm, ESPN+ | | Green Bay | L 63–78 | 4–12 (1–5) | 14 – Smith | 7 – Baxter | 5 – Smith | OU Credit Union O'rena (733); Auburn Hills, MI |
| January 10, 2026; 2:00 pm, ESPN+ | | Milwaukee | W 66–45 | 5–12 (2–5) | 17 – 2 tied | 9 – Luehring | 4 – 2 tied | OU Credit Union O'rena (538); Auburn Hills, MI |
| January 18, 2026; 1:00 pm, ESPN+ | | at Detroit Mercy; Metro Series | W 80–70 | 6–12 (3–5) | 25 – Luehring | 10 – Gold | 5 – Goula | Calihan Hall (444); Detroit, MI |
| January 22, 2026; 7:00 pm, ESPN+ | | at Green Bay | L 59–73 | 6–13 (3–6) | 16 – Baxter | 9 – Gold | 4 – 2 tied | Kress Events Center (1,689); Green Bay, WI |
| January 24, 2026; 3:00 pm, ESPN+ | | at Milwaukee | W 82–71 | 7–13 (4–6) | 24 – Luehring | 7 – Baxter | 5 – 2 tied | Klotsche Center (733); Milwaukee, WI |
| January 28, 2026; 6:30 pm, ESPN+ | | IU Indy | W 64–61 | 8–13 (5–6) | 24 – Luehring | 10 – Baxter | 3 – 3 tied | OU Credit Union O'rena (821); Auburn Hills, MI |
| January 31, 2026; 2:00 pm, ESPN+ | | Youngstown State | L 60–72 | 8–14 (5–7) | 20 – Luehring | 6 – Roberts-Adams | 4 – Luehring | OU Credit Union O'rena; Auburn Hills, MI |
| February 3, 2026; 6:00 pm, ESPN+ | | at Northern Kentucky | L 76–77 | 8–15 (5–8) | 26 – Luehring | 11 – Roberts-Adams | 3 – 2 tied | Truist Arena (1,216); Highland Heights, KY |
| February 7, 2026; 1:00 pm, ESPN+ | | Detroit Mercy; Metro Series | L 69–72 | 8–16 (5–9) | 33 – Luehring | 10 – Roberts-Adams | 4 – Goula | OU Credit Union O'rena (538); Auburn Hills, MI |
| February 11, 2026; 6:30 pm, ESPN+ | | at IU Indy | L 57–64 | 8–17 (5–10) | 15 – Luehring | 6 – 2 tied | 6 – Goula | The Jungle (315); Indianapolis, IN |
| February 14, 2026; 2:00 pm, ESPN+ | | Wright State | L 44–62 | 8–18 (5–11) | 14 – Luehring | 16 – Trotter | 2 – Rogers | OU Credit Union O'rena; Auburn Hills, MI |
| February 18, 2026; 7:00 pm, ESPN+ | | at Purdue Fort Wayne | W 71–64 | 9–18 (6–11) | 17 – Luehring | 14 – Baxter | 9 – Luehring | Hilliard Gates Sports Center (722); Fort Wayne, IN |
| February 21, 2026; 2:00 pm, ESPN+ | | Robert Morris | W 71–61 | 10–18 (7–11) | 31 – Luehring | 8 – 2 tied | 5 – Luehring | OU Credit Union O'rena (678); Auburn Hills, MI |
| February 25, 2026; 6:30 pm, ESPN+ | | Northern Kentucky | L 59–84 | 10–19 (7–12) | 20 – Luehring | 7 – Roberts-Adams | 7 – Luehring | OU Credit Union O'rena (450); Auburn Hills, MI |
| February 28, 2026; 2:00 pm, ESPN+ | | at Cleveland State | L 59–73 | 10–20 (7–13) | 18 – Baxter | 8 – Baxter | 5 – Luehring | Wolstein Center (613); Cleveland, OH |
Horizon League tournament
| March 4, 2026; 7:00 pm, ESPN+ | (8) | at (3) Cleveland State; First Round | L 80–81 ^{OT} | 10–21 | 39 – Luehring | 8 – Goula | 8 – Goula | Wolstein Center (501); Cleveland, OH |
*Non-conference game. ^{#}Rankings from AP poll. (#) Tournament seedings in parentheses. All times are in Eastern.
