= 2025–26 IU Indy Jaguars women's basketball team =

American college basketball season

2025–26 IU Indy Jaguars women's basketball
- Conference: Horizon League
- Record: 14–17 (9–11 Horizon)
- Head coach: Kate Bruce (4th season)
- Assistant coaches: Hannah Blake; Mary Evans; Marwan Miller
- Home arena: The Jungle

2025–26 Horizon League women's basketball standings
	Conf.				Overall
Team	W		L	PCT	W		L	PCT
Green Bay †	17	–	3	.850	25	–	9	.735
Youngstown State	15	–	5	.750	25	–	10	.714
Cleveland State	13	–	7	.650	26	–	10	.722
Northern Kentucky	12	–	8	.600	15	–	17	.469
Purdue Fort Wayne	12	–	8	.600	21	–	14	.600
Robert Morris	11	–	9	.550	18	–	12	.600
IU Indy	9	–	11	.450	14	–	17	.452
Oakland	7	–	13	.350	10	–	21	.323
Wright State	6	–	14	.300	10	–	22	.313
Milwaukee	4	–	16	.200	8	–	24	.250
Detroit Mercy	4	–	16	.200	7	–	24	.226
† 2026 Horizon League tournament winner

The 2025–26 IU Indy Jaguars women's basketball team represented Indiana University Indianapolis during the 2025–26 NCAA Division I women's basketball season. The Jaguars, led by third-year head coach Kate Bruce, played their home games at The Jungle in Indianapolis, Indiana as members of the Horizon League.

This is planned to be the Jaguars' final season at The Jungle. IU Indy plans to open the new James T. Morris Arena in time for the 2026–27 season.

== Previous season ==
The Jaguars finished the 2024–25 season 9–21, 8–12 in Horizon League play, to finish in a tie for fifth place. They were defeated by Oakland in the first round of the Horizon League tournament.

== Preseason ==
On October 9, 2025, the Horizon League released their preseason poll and league teams. IU Indy was picked to finish tenth in the conference. No players were named to the preseason All-Horizon League First or Second Teams.

=== Preseason rankings ===
Horizon League Preseason Coaches Poll
Place	Team	Votes
1	Green Bay	117 (8)
2	Robert Morris	97 (1)
3	Youngstown State	92 (1)
4	Cleveland State	87 (1)
5	Purdue Fort Wayne	79
6	Northern Kentucky	70
7	Detroit Mercy	59
8	Wright State	47
9	Milwaukee	29
10	IU Indy	27
11	Oakland	22
(#) first-place votes

== Roster ==
2025–26 IU Indy Jaguars women's basketball team
Players
Coaches

Pos.	#	Name	Height	Year	Previous school	Hometown
G/F	1	Destini Craig	5 ft 10 in (1.78 m)	RS Fr	Northrop High School	Fort Wayne, Indiana
G	2	Jemma Amoore	5 ft 4 in (1.63 m)	So	Sacramento State	Ballarat, Australia
G	3	Sydney Bolden	5 ft 8 in (1.73 m)	Sr	Ball State	Loganville, Georgia
G	4	E'Zaria Adams	5 ft 9 in (1.75 m)	Jr	Eastern Florida State	West Palm Beach, Florida
G	5	Camron Blank	5 ft 9 in (1.75 m)	GS	Rock Valley	Rockford, Illinois
G/F	10	Denali Craig-Edwards	6 ft 1 in (1.85 m)	Jr	Western Michigan	Peoria, Illinois
F	11	Ariana Williams	6 ft 2 in (1.88 m)	So	Penn State	Chicago, Illinois
G	12	Kamara Mills	5 ft 9 in (1.75 m)	So	Queens	Indianapolis, Indiana
G	14	Nevaeh Foster	5 ft 8 in (1.73 m)	Jr	Western Kentucky	South Bend, Indiana
G	23	Kaylin Moorehead	5 ft 6 in (1.68 m)	RS So	Westfield Prep	Redford, Michigan
G	24	Mylie Wilkinson	5 ft 7 in (1.7 m)	Fr	Greensburg High School	Greensburg, Indiana
G/F	30	Hailey Smith	5 ft 10 in (1.78 m)	Jr	Ball State	Fishers, Indiana
G/F	31	Olivia Smith	5 ft 10 in (1.78 m)	Jr	Ball State	Fishers, Indiana
G/F	32	Julia Hall	6 ft 0 in (1.83 m)	Fr	Magnificat High School	Rocky River, Ohio
G	33	Emmy Lowe	5 ft 8 in (1.73 m)	Fr	Pickett County High School	Byrdstown, Tennessee

Head coach

- Kate Bruce (Florida Gulf Coast)

Assistant coach(es)

- Hannah Blake (Walsh)
- Mary Evans (Georgia Southern)
- Marwan Miller (Franklin)

Legend

- (C) Team captain
- (S) Suspended
- (I) Ineligible
- (W) Walk-on
- Injured
- Current redshirt

Roster
Last update: May 31, 2026

== Schedule and results ==
Date time, TV	Rank^{#}	Opponent^{#}	Result	Record	High points	High rebounds	High assists	Site (attendance) city, state
Regular season
November 3, 2025*; 6:30 pm, ESPN+		Indiana State	W 67–64	1–0	15 – H. Smith	11 – Williams	2 – O. Smith	The Jungle (520); Indianapolis, IN
November 5, 2025*; 8:00 pm, B1G+		at Northwestern	L 64–67	1–1	1 – 2 tied	7 – H. Smith	3 – 3 tied	Welsh-Ryan Arena (747); Evanston, IL
November 9, 2025*; 1:00 pm, ESPN+		Ball State	L 72–81	1–2	19 – H. Smith	7 – 2 tied	4 – Bolden	The Jungle (512); Indianapolis, IN
November 15, 2025*; 6:00 pm, ESPN+		Bradley	W 75–67	2–2	28 – Foster	9 – H. Smith	3 – H. Smith	The Jungle (324); Indianapolis, IN
November 20, 2025*; 7:00 pm, ESPN+		at Evansville	L 58–75	2–3	16 – Foster	8 – H. Smith	5 – O. Smith	Meeks Family Fieldhouse (275); Evansville, IN
November 23, 2025*; 4:00 pm, ESPN+		at Marshall	L 70–81	2–4	19 – Foster	6 – 2 tied	6 – H. Smith	Cam Henderson Center (1,216); Huntington, WV
November 26, 2025*; 1:00 pm, ESPN+		Anderson	W 94–58	3–4	22 – Foster	6 – 2 tied	4 – 2 tied	The Jungle (412); Indianapolis, IN
December 3, 2025; 6:30 pm, ESPN+		Purdue Fort Wayne	L 68–74	3–5 (0–1)	15 – H. Smith	13 – H. Smith	3 – O. Smith	The Jungle (454); Indianapolis, IN
December 7, 2025; 1:00 pm, ESPN+		at Detroit Mercy	L 69–74	3–6 (0–2)	15 – Bolden	6 – 2 tied	2 – 2 tied	Calihan Hall (203); Detroit, MI
December 10, 2025; 6:30 pm, ESPN+		Green Bay	L 47–74	3–7 (0–3)	15 – Foster	6 – Foster	2 – 2 tied	The Jungle (401); Indianapolis, IN
December 17, 2025*; 6:30 pm, ESPN+		IU Columbus	W 79–40	4–7	13 – Foster	8 – 2 tied	3 – 2 tied	The Jungle (397); Indianapolis, IN
December 21, 2025*; 12:00 pm, B1G+		at Wisconsin	L 72–81	4–8	21 – Mills	4 – O. Smith	2 – Williams	Kohl Center (1,329); Madison, WI
December 29, 2025; 6:30 pm, ESPN+		Milwaukee	W 58–49	5–8 (1–3)	19 – O. Smith	10 – H. Smith	5 – H. Smith	The Jungle (303); Indianapolis, IN
January 2, 2026; 6:00 pm, ESPN+		at Northern Kentucky	L 44–63	5–9 (1–4)	8 – 2 tied	6 – Foster	2 – H. Smith	Truist Arena (1,086); Highland Heights, KY
January 5, 2026; 7:00 pm, ESPN+		at Purdue Fort Wayne	L 46–71	5–10 (1–5)	11 – H. Smith	8 – H. Smith	3 – H. Smith	Hilliard Gates Sports Center (509); Fort Wayne, IN
January 11, 2026; 1:00 pm, ESPN+		Wright State	W 70–59	6–10 (2–5)	16 – O. Smith	10 – Williams	3 – Foster	The Jungle (489); Indianapolis, IN
January 15, 2026; 6:00 pm, ESPN+		at Robert Morris	L 70–80 ^{OT}	6–11 (2–6)	19 – O. Smith	6 – Foster	2 – 2 tied	UPMC Events Center (515); Moon Township, PA
January 17, 2026; 2:00 pm, ESPN+		at Youngstown State	W 61–52	7–11 (3–6)	16 – O. Smith	8 – Williams	4 – Williams	Beeghly Center (1,271); Youngstown, OH
January 21, 2026; 6:30 pm, ESPN+		Northern Kentucky	W 75–70	8–11 (4–6)	23 – O. Smith	8 – Craig	3 – Adams	The Jungle (437); Indianapolis, IN
January 28, 2026; 6:30 pm, ESPN+		at Oakland	L 61–64	8–12 (4–7)	12 – Williams	8 – H. Smith	3 – Foster	OU Credit Union O'rena (821); Rochester, MI
February 1, 2026; 1:00 pm, ESPN+		Robert Morris	L 71–76	8–13 (4–8)	17 – H. Smith	5 – H. Smith	3 – Craig	The Jungle (246); Indianapolis, IN
February 4, 2026; 6:30 pm, ESPN+		Cleveland State	W 78–70	9–13 (5–8)	22 – Foster	8 – H. Smith	6 – H. Smith	The Jungle (352); Indianapolis, IN
February 7, 2026; 2:00 pm, ESPN+		at Wright State	W 73–63	10–13 (6–8)	17 – Foster	12 – H. Smith	3 – 2 tied	Nutter Center (1,164); Fairborn, OH
February 11, 2026; 6:30 pm, ESPN+		Oakland	W 64–57	11–13 (7–8)	17 – Foster	8 – H. Smith	3 – Craig	The Jungle (315); Indianapolis, IN
February 15, 2026; 1:00 pm, ESPN+		Youngstown State	L 65–69	11–14 (7–9)	20 – Foster	10 – Craig	3 – O. Smith	The Jungle (375); Indianapolis, IN
February 19, 2026; 7:00 pm, ESPN+		at Cleveland State	L 45–74	11–15 (7–10)	11 – Foster	6 – H. Smith	2 – 2 tied	Wolstein Center (547); Cleveland, OH
February 22, 2026; 1:00 pm, ESPN+		Detroit Mercy	W 74–72	12–15 (8–10)	20 – O. Smith	7 – Williams	4 – O. Smith	The Jungle (523); Indianapolis, IN
February 25, 2026; 7:00 pm, ESPN+		at Green Bay	L 61–72	12–16 (8–11)	17 – Foster	4 – 3 tied	5 – O. Smith	Kress Events Center (1,941); Green Bay, WI
February 28, 2026; 3:00 pm, ESPN+		at Milwaukee	W 80–77 ^{OT}	13–16 (9–11)	20 – Craig	8 – Craig	3 – O. Smith	Klotsche Center (721); Milwaukee, WI
Horizon League tournament
March 4, 2026; 7:00 pm, ESPN+	(7)	at (4) Northern Kentucky; First Round	W 74–72	14–16	20 – O. Smith	9 – H. Smith	3 – H. Smith	Truist Arena (892); Highland Heights, KY
March 8, 2026; 1:00 pm, ESPN+	(7)	vs. (5) Purdue Fort Wayne; Second Round	L 49–85	14–17	20 – H. Smith	6 – Williams	4 – O. Smith	Corteva Coliseum; Indianapolis, IN
*Non-conference game. ^{#}Rankings from AP poll. (#) Tournament seedings in parentheses. All times are in Eastern.
