= Bailey Butler =

American basketball player (born 2003)

No. 22 – Green Bay Phoenix
- Position: Point guard
- League: Horizon League

Personal information
- Born: March 27, 2003 (age 23) South Wayne, Wisconsin, U.S.
- Listed height: 5 ft 7 in (1.70 m)
- Listed weight: 145 lb (66 kg)

Career information
- High school: Black Hawk; South Wayne, Wisconsin
- College: Green Bay (2021–2025)

Career highlights
- Second-team All-Horizon League (2023); Third-team All-Horizon League (2024); Horizon League Defensive Player of the Year (2025); 3x Horizon League All-Defensive Team (2023, 2024, 2025); Horizon League Sixth Player of the Year (2022); Horizon League Freshman of the Year (2022); Phoenix All-Time Leader in D1 for career assists (548); Wisconsin Miss Basketball (2021)

Bailey Butler (born March 27, 2003) is an American former college basketball player, who spent four seasons as a point guard for the Green Bay Phoenix of the Horizon League. Butler is currently the all-time Division I leader in assists for the Green Bay women's program, reaching the margin in her final season with the team. Butler captured two or more league honors in each of her four seasons with the Phoenix, including a defensive player of the year as a senior, and a part of two Green Bay teams that made the NCAA women's basketball tournament in 2024 and 2025.

== Personal life ==
Born to parents Angie and Scott Butler, Bailey has five siblings, including two brothers and three sisters. Brother Heath and sisters Hannah, Paige, and Kylie all scored 1,000 career points respectively for Black Hawk High School. Bailey Bailey’s younger sister Kylie is currently playing basketball for UWGB’s rival team Milwaukee.

== High school ==
Butler played both basketball and volleyball at Black Hawk High School in her hometown of South Wayne, Wisconsin, where as a guard she helped lead the Warriors basketball team to a 103–2 record, including a 2018 state runner-up finish while as a freshman and a 2019 state championship as a sophomore.

As the school's starting guard all four years, Butler is Black Hawk's all-time scoring leader with 1,960 points including a 28.3 points per game average her senior year in 2021, which led the state of Wisconsin that season.

Butler was a four-time Wisconsin Basketball Coaches Association Division 5 All-State selection, 2021 Associated Press All-State Girls Basketball First-Team (unanimous selection), and 2021 Wisconsin Miss Basketball.

== College career ==
Butler verbally committed to the Green Bay Phoenix in June 2019 and officially signed her letter of intent on November 11, 2020. She became the fourth Wisconsin Miss Basketball player to play at Green Bay.

=== Freshman season (2021–22) ===
Playing in 27 games, Butler averaged 3.1 rebounds per game, and totaled 58 assists and 38 steals. In scoring, Butler recorded season highs of 14 points twice, at Youngstown State on December 4, 2021, and vs. UW-Milwaukee on February 7, 2022. The Horizon League voted Butler onto the All-Freshman Team plus Freshman of the Year and Sixth Player of the Year awards. Green Bay finished third in the conference and earned an at-large bid to the 2022 Women's National Invitation Tournament.

=== Sophomore season (2022–23) ===
Bailey averaged 8.5 points, 3.9 rebounds, and 4.1 assists per game, including a conference leading 2.26 assist-to-turnover ratio. Butler's notable games include an 11-for-11 free throw effort vs. Wisconsin on December 14, 2022, and a near double-double of 16 points and 9 assists at Oakland on February 5, 2023. Elected to the Horizon League All-League Second-Team and All-Defensive Team, Butler help led the team to the regular-season conference title and another WNIT bid, this time reaching the 2nd round.

=== Junior season (2023–24) ===
Bailey led the conference in assists at 5.4 per game (181 total) and assist-to-turnover ratio at 2.9. Finished second in the conference with 2.18 steals per game (72 total). Butler scored 20 points and nabbed 6 steals at Northern Kentucky on January 5, 2024, both career highs. Against Oakland on February 22, 2024, Butler notched a double-double with 10 rebounds and 10 assists. Voted Horizon League All-League Third Team and All-Defensive Team, Butler helped Green Bay win the conference tournament, earning an automatic bid to the NCAA tournament after a five-year absence.

=== Senior season (2024–25) ===
Butler led the league again in assists at 4.8 per game (160 total) and assist-to-turnover ratio at 2.9. Butler twice recorded double-digit assist totals with 12 at UW-Milwaukee on December 11, 2024, and vs. Northern Kentucky on January 2, 2025. Butler became the school's all-time Division I career assist leader by the end of the regular season, passing Megan Lukan at 525 assists.

Voted onto the Horizon League All-Defensive Team along with teammate and senior Jasmine Kondrakiewicz, Butler was also awarded the Horizon League Defensive Player of the Year. Butler helped Green Bay win both the Horizon League regular-season and tournament championships, earning another bid to the NCAA tournament.
