= Jasmine Kondrakiewicz =

American basketball player and coach (born 2002)

No. 21 – Green Bay Phoenix
- Position: Forward
- League: Horizon League

Personal information
- Listed height: 6 ft 1 in (1.85 m)

Career information
- High school: Pius XI (Milwaukee, Wisconsin)
- College: Green Bay (2020–2025)

Career highlights
- Horizon League All-Defensive Team (2025)

Jasmine ‘Jas’ Mariah Kondrakiewicz is an American college basketball player and assistant coach, currently a member of the Green Bay Phoenix coaching staff of the Horizon League. She ranks third on the school's all-time Division 1 list in blocked shots and became the 40th member of the team's 1000-point club. In 2025, Jasmine broke the program record for games played in a career, tied with her longtime teammate Cassie Schiltz. After five seasons of eligibility as a player, Kondrakiewicz was hired by head coach Kayla Karius to become an assistant coach for the program on June 10, 2025.

== Early career ==
Kondrakiewicz played high school basketball at Pius XI in Milwaukee. In her prep career, she averaged 12.5 points and 10.8 rebounds per game. In March 2020, Kondrakiewicz was named Woodland Conference Player of the Year and to the Wisconsin Basketball Coaches Association (WBCA) Division 2 All-State Team.

== College career ==
Jasmine officially committed to the Green Bay Phoenix under coach Kevin Borseth during the Fall 2019 signing day. Kondrakiewicz started in all 22 games of her freshman season, averaging 7.5 points and 3.8 rebounds per game and lead the team with 19 blocks. In her college debut on November 28, 2020, she scored 15 points against Drake. On February 12, 2021, Jasmine recorded season highs of 18 points and 12 rebounds versus Illinois-Chicago (her first college career double-double).

In Kondrakiewicz's 2nd freshman campaign, she played in 26 games as a key reserve and started in 3. Averaging 5.2 points and 2.9 rebounds per game, Kondrakiewicz recorded season highs of 11 points against IUPUI (February 19, 2022) and 9 rebounds against Robert Morris (December 12, 2021).

In her sophomore season, Kondrakiewicz played in all 34 games and started the last 23. Jasmine averaged 8.2 points and 4.4 rebounds per game and totaled 32 blocks. She matched her career high of 18 points in 2 games. On February 25, 2023, she set a new career-high with 14 rebounds against Purdue Fort Wayne. Kondrakiewicz helped Green Bay win the 2023 Horizon League Regular Season title and reach the 2nd round of the 2023 Women's National Invitational Tournament.

As a junior, Kondrakiewicz started in all 34 games, averaging 8.0 points and 4.8 rebounds per contest and again recorded 32 blocks. On January 29, 2024, she was awarded Horizon League Player of the Week for recording 21 points and 12 rebounds at IUPUI on January 24 and scoring 20 points against Wright State on January 27. On February 28, 2024, Jasmine blocked a career-high 5 shots along with 14 points and 12 rebounds against Purdue Fort Wayne. Jasmine's contributions helped the 2024 Green Bay team win the Horizon League Tournament and reach the National Collegiate Athletic Association (NCAA) Tournament, ending a five-year drought.

After a head coaching change, Kondrakiewicz opted to stay with Green Bay for her 5th year senior season. On January 23, 2025, she poured in a career-high 31 points at Wright State. Two days later, she scored 10 points and corralled 9 rebounds at Northern Kentucky. These two performances earned Jasmine Horizon League Player of the Week honors on January 27, the second honor of her career. After the end of the regular season on March 3, Kondrakiewicz was named to the Horizon League's All-Defensive Team alongside teammate Bailey Butler. Kondrakiewicz helped the 2025 Green Bay team win both the regular season and tournament titles in the Horizon League, returning to the NCAA Tournament for the 20th time in school history.

In January 2025, Kondrakiewicz was selected for Women's Basketball Coaches Association's (WBCA) “So You Want To Be A Coach” programme and was hired by head coach Kayla Karius to become an assistant coach for her team.
