= 2025–26 Louisiana Ragin' Cajuns women's basketball team =

American college basketball season

2025–26 Louisiana Ragin' Cajuns women's basketball
- Conference: Sun Belt Conference
- Record: 5–26 (2–16 Sun Belt)
- Head coach: Garry Brodhead (14th season)
- Associate head coach: Temeka Johnson
- Assistant coaches: Kacie Cryer; Marvin Harvey
- Home arena: Cajundome

2025–26 Sun Belt Conference women's basketball standings
	Conf.				Overall
Team	W		L	PCT	W		L	PCT
Georgia Southern	16	–	2	.889	23	–	8	.742
Troy	15	–	3	.833	25	–	8	.758
Arkansas State	14	–	4	.778	26	–	9	.743
James Madison †	14	–	4	.778	25	–	9	.735
Marshall	13	–	5	.722	25	–	9	.735
Old Dominion	9	–	9	.500	18	–	14	.563
Southern Miss	8	–	10	.444	15	–	16	.484
Texas State	7	–	11	.389	11	–	19	.367
Coastal Carolina	7	–	11	.389	14	–	18	.438
Louisiana–Monroe	7	–	11	.389	17	–	16	.515
Georgia State	5	–	13	.278	10	–	21	.323
South Alabama	5	–	13	.278	17	–	19	.472
Appalachian State	4	–	14	.222	11	–	19	.367
Louisiana	2	–	16	.111	5	–	26	.161
† 2026 Sun Belt tournament winner As of March 27, 2026

The 2025–26 Louisiana Ragin' Cajuns women's basketball team represents the University of Louisiana at Lafayette during the 2025–26 NCAA Division I women's basketball season. The Ragin' Cajuns, led by fourteenth-year head coach Garry Brodhead, play their home games at the Cajundome. They are competing as members of the Sun Belt Conference.

== Previous season ==
The Louisiana finished the 2024–25 season 13–16, 9–9 in the Sun Belt play to finish in a three-way tie for fifth place. They were defeated by 11th-seeded Marshall in the Third Round of the Sun Belt tournament.

== Preseason ==
On October 20, 2025, the Sun Belt Conference released their preseason coaches poll. Louisiana was picked to finish eleventh in the Sun Belt regular season.

=== Preseason rankings ===
Sun Belt preseason poll
Predicted finish	Team	Votes (1st place)
1	James Madison	189 (9)
2	Arkansas State	174 (3)
3	Troy	171 (1)
4	Old Dominion	151 (1)
5	Southern Miss	125
6	Coastal Carolina	104
7	Georgia State	102
8	Marshall	100
9	Appalachian State	94
10	Georgia Southern	73
11	Louisiana	67
12	Texas State	55
13	Louisiana–Monroe	36
14	South Alabama	29

== Roster ==
2025–26 Louisiana Ragin' Cajuns women's basketball team
Players
Coaches

Pos.	#	Name	Height	Year	Previous school	Hometown
G	1	Kahlen Norris	5 ft 9 in (1.75 m)	Jr	The Colony HS; Hutchinson CC	The Colony, Texas
G	2	Amijah Price	5 ft 8 in (1.73 m)	Fr	Woodlawn HS	Baton Rouge, Louisiana
G	3	Stephanie Mosley	6 ft 0 in (1.83 m)	Sr	Timberview HS; Norfolk State	Mansfield, Texas
G	4	Jazmyne Jackson	5 ft 7 in (1.7 m)	Sr	Ray Braswell HS; Georgia Southern	Dallas, Texas
G	5	Zoriahn Davis	5 ft 5 in (1.65 m)	Jr	New Iberia Senior HS; Baton Rouge CC	New Iberia, Louisiana
F	8	Lily Ba	6 ft 3 in (1.91 m)	Jr	Blue Valley West HS; Tulane	Overland Park, Kansas
F	10	Marina Artero	5 ft 11 in (1.8 m)	Jr	FC Barcelona; Saint Francis	Fontanilles, Spain
F	11	Arionna Patterson	5 ft 11 in (1.8 m)	Fr	Walker HS	Baton Rouge, Louisiana
G	13	Bianca Silva	5 ft 6 in (1.68 m)	Jr	Layton Christian Academy; Northwest	Florianopolis, Brazil
G	15	Imani Daniel	5 ft 9 in (1.75 m)	Fr	John Curtis Christian	Gramercy, Louisiana
G	24	Mikaylah Manley	5 ft 8 in (1.73 m)	Jr	Barbe HS; Southern Miss	Lake Charles, Louisiana

Head coach

- Garry Brodhead (Louisiana)

Assistant coach(es)

- Temeka Johnson (LSU)
- Kacie Cryer (LSU Shreveport)
- Marvin Harvey (Ottawa)

Legend

- (C) Team captain
- (S) Suspended
- (I) Ineligible
- (W) Walk-on
- Injured
- Current redshirt

Roster
Last update: January 3, 2026

== Schedule and results ==
Date time, TV	Rank^{#}	Opponent^{#}	Result	Record	High points	High rebounds	High assists	Site city, state
Exhibition
October 23, 2025*; 6:00 p.m.		LSU Alexandria	W 92–47		19 – Tied	15 – Daniel	6 – Silva	Cajundome (353); Lafayette, LA
October 28, 2025*; 6:00 p.m.		Mississippi College	W 78–67		22 – Daniel	6 – Manley	2 – Tied	Cajundome (279); Lafayette, LA
Regular season
November 3, 2025*; 6:00 p.m., ESPN+		Bowling Green; MAC-SBC Challenge	L 67–82	0–1	17 – Price	9 – Daniel	2 – Manley	Cajundome (516); Lafayette, LA
November 7, 2025*; 5:00 p.m., ESPN+		Delta State	L 68–76	0–2	20 – Price	9 – Price	3 – Jackson	Cajundome (643); Lafayette, LA
November 10, 2025*; 7:00 p.m., SECN+		at No. 4 Texas	L 38–100	0–3	17 – Daniel	5 – TEAM	2 – Tied	Moody Center (8,677); Austin, TX
November 14, 2025*; 6:30 p.m., ESPN+		at Nicholls	L 64–66	0–4	23 – Manley	11 – Price	3 – Price	Stopher Gymnasium (711); Thibodaux, LA
November 25, 2025*; 7:00 p.m., ESPN+		at Memphis	L 64–70	0–5	19 – Silva	8 – Tied	6 – Silva	Elma Roane Fieldhouse (681); Memphis, TN
November 28, 2025*; 12:00 p.m.		vs. High Point; Big Easy Classic	L 62–77	0–6	17 – Manley	8 – Ba	7 – Silva	Alario Center (196); Westwego, LA
November 29, 2025*; 2:30 p.m.		vs. Fresno State; Big Easy Classic	L 48–61	0–7	17 – Daniel	10 – Daniel	4 – Silva	Alario Center (183); Westwego, LA
December 2, 2025*; 11:00 a.m., ESPN+		East Texas A&M	L 47–72	0–8	18 – Price	7 – Manley	2 – Silva	Cajundome (5,046); Lafayette, LA
December 7, 2025*; 4:00 p.m., ESPN+		Morehead State	L 54–61	0–9	13 – Silva	5 – Artero	3 – Silva	Cajundome (529); Lafayette, LA
December 17, 2025; 5:00 p.m., ESPN+		at Texas State	L 55–62	0–10 (0–1)	20 – Daniel	7 – Manley	6 – Silva	Strahan Arena; San Marcos, TX
December 20, 2025; 1:00 p.m., ESPN+		at Southern Miss	L 58–76	0–11 (0–2)	15 – Daniel	8 – Daniel	5 – Silva	Reed Green Coliseum; Hattiesburg, MS
December 29, 2025*; 6:00 p.m., ESPN+		Dillard	W 97–56	1–11	30 – Price	9 – Artero	5 – Silva	Cajundome (639); Lafayette, LA
January 1, 2026; 4:00 p.m., ESPN+		Troy	L 54–80	1–12 (0–3)	15 – Price	9 – Price	4 – Price	Cajundome (518); Lafayette, LA
January 3, 2026; 3:00 p.m., ESPN+		South Alabama	L 56–81	1–13 (0–4)	24 – Price	8 – Daniel	2 – Silva	Cajundome (557); Lafayette, LA
January 8, 2026; 5:00 p.m, ESPN+		Louisiana–Monroe	L 51-61	1-14 (0-5)	18 – Price	8 – Manley	2 – Mosley	Cajundome (544); Lafayette, LA
January 10, 2026; 3:00 p.m., ESPN+		Texas State	L 43-55	1-15 (0-6)	16 – Daniel	7 – Daniel	3 – Tied	Cajundome (503); Lafayette, LA
January 15, 2026; 7:00 p.m., ESPN+		at Arkansas State	L 34-75	1-16 (0-7)	10 – Price	11 – Price	3 – Tied	First National Bank Arena (1,123); Jonesboro, AR
January 17, 2026; 12:00 p.m., ESPN+		at Louisiana–Monroe	L 58-102	1-17 (0-8)	20 – Manley	8 – Mosley	5 – Silva	Fant–Ewing Coliseum (1,346); Monroe, LA
January 21, 2026; 6:00 p.m., ESPN+		Coastal Carolina	W 69-66	2-17 (1-8)	25 – Manley	7 – Silva	3 – Artero	Cajundome (484); Lafayette, LA
January 23, 2026; 6:00 p.m., ESPN+		Appalachian State	L 48−68	2−18 (1−9)	15 – Norris	5 – Manley	4 – Silva	Cajundome (409); Lafayette, LA
January 29, 2026; 5:00 p.m., ESPN+		at James Madison	L 45-96	2-19 (1-10)	21 – Manley	7 – Daniel	2 – Tied	Atlantic Union Bank Center (1,988); Harrisonburg, VA
January 31, 2026; 12:00 p.m., ESPN+		at Marshall	L 54-95	2-20 (1-11)	12 – Manley	10 – Manley	4 – Silva	Cam Henderson Center (1,538); Huntington, WV
February 4, 2026; 6:00 p.m., ESPN+		Old Dominion	L 61-72	2-21 (1-12)	27 – Manley	6 – Tied	2 – Tied	Cajundome (616); Lafayette, LA
February 7, 2026*; 11:00 a.m., ESPN+		Akron; MAC-SBC Challenge	W 82-71	3-21	21 – Daniel	11 – Price	7 – Silva	James A. Rhodes Arena (747); Akron, OH
February 12, 2026; 6:00 p.m., ESPN+		at Troy	L 55-71	3-22 (1-13)	24 – Daniel	13 – Silva	3 – Price	Trojan Arena (1,774); Troy, AL
February 14, 2026; 2:00 p.m., ESPN+		at South Alabama	W 57-54	4-22 (2-13)	23 – Manley	9 – Price	3 – Manley	Mitchell Center (374); Mobile, AL
February 18, 2026; 6:00 p.m., ESPN+		Southern Miss	L 61-83	4-23 (2-14)	15 – Daniel	7 – Daniel	3 – Tied	Cajundome (628); Lafayette, LA
February 21, 2026; 3:00 p.m., ESPN+		Arkansas State	L 66-92	4-24 (2-15)	19 – Price	13 – Daniel	3 – Silva	Cajundome (846); Lafayette, LA
February 27, 2026; 4:00 p.m., ESPN+		at Georgia State	L 68-74	4-25 (2-16)	16 – Tied	10 – Manley	4 – Manley	Georgia State Convocation Center (793); Atlanta, GA
SBC tournament
March 3, 2026; 2:00 p.m., ESPN+	(14)	vs. (11) Georgia State; First Round	W 71-66	5-25	32 – Manley	10 – Price	3 – Manley	Gateway Center Arena (426); College Park, GA
March 4, 2026; 2:00 p.m., ESPN+	(14)	vs. (10) Louisiana-Monroe; Second Round	L 63-79	5-26	18 – Manley	7 – Daniel	6 – Silva	Gateway Center Arena (446); College Park, GA
*Non-conference game. ^{#}Rankings from AP Poll. (#) Tournament seedings in parentheses. All times are in Central.
