= 2025–26 Southern Miss Lady Eagles basketball team =

American college basketball season

2025–26 Southern Miss Lady Eagles basketball
- Conference: Sun Belt Conference
- Record: 15–16 (8–10 Sun Belt)
- Head coach: Missy Bilderback (1st season)
- Associate head coach: Lauren Pittman
- Assistant coaches: Jonathan Williams; Lauren Gross
- Home arena: Reed Green Coliseum

2025–26 Sun Belt Conference women's basketball standings
	Conf.				Overall
Team	W		L	PCT	W		L	PCT
Georgia Southern	16	–	2	.889	23	–	8	.742
Troy	15	–	3	.833	25	–	8	.758
Arkansas State	14	–	4	.778	27	–	10	.730
James Madison †	14	–	4	.778	26	–	9	.743
Marshall	13	–	5	.722	28	–	9	.757
Old Dominion	9	–	9	.500	18	–	14	.563
Southern Miss	8	–	10	.444	15	–	16	.484
Texas State	7	–	11	.389	11	–	19	.367
Coastal Carolina	7	–	11	.389	14	–	18	.438
Louisiana–Monroe	7	–	11	.389	17	–	16	.515
Georgia State	5	–	13	.278	10	–	21	.323
South Alabama	5	–	13	.278	17	–	19	.472
Appalachian State	4	–	14	.222	11	–	19	.367
Louisiana	2	–	16	.111	5	–	26	.161
† 2026 Sun Belt tournament winner

The 2025–26 Southern Miss Lady Eagles basketball team represented the University of Southern Mississippi during the 2025–26 NCAA Division I women's basketball season. The Lady Eagles, led by first-year head coach Missy Bilderback, played their home games at the Reed Green Coliseum in Hattiesburg, Mississippi as members of the Sun Belt Conference.

== Previous season ==
The Lady Eagles finished the 2024–25 season 10–21, 5–13 in Sun Belt play, to finish in 13th place. They were defeated by Georgia Southern in the first round of the Sun Belt tournament.

During the season, on February 21, 2025, head coach Joye Lee-McNelis announced that she would be retiring at the end of the season, ending her 21-year tenure with the team. On March 25, 2025, the school announced that they would be hiring Louisiana–Monroe head coach and Southern Miss alum Missy Bilderback as the team's new head coach.

== Preseason ==
On October 20, 2025, the Sun Belt Conference released their preseason poll. Southern Miss was picked to finish fifth in the conference.

=== Preseason rankings ===
Sun Belt Preseason Poll
Place	Team	Votes
1	James Madison	189 (9)
2	Arkansas State	174 (3)
3	Troy	171 (1)
4	Old Dominion	151 (1)
5	Southern Miss	125
6	Coastal Carolina	104
7	Georgia State	102
8	Marshall	100
9	Appalachian State	94
10	Georgia Southern	73
11	Louisiana	67
12	Texas State	55
13	Louisiana–Monroe	36
14	South Alabama	29
(#) first-place votes

=== Preseason All-Sun Belt Teams ===
Preseason All-Sun Belt Teams
Team	Player	Year	Position
First	Jakayla Johnson	Graduate Student	Guard
Third	Meloney Thames	Graduate Student	Guard

== Roster ==
2025–26 Southern Miss Lady Eagles women's basketball team
Players
Coaches

Pos.	#	Name	Height	Year	Previous school	Hometown
G/F	0	Anaisha Carriere	6 ft 3 in (1.91 m)	So	Mississippi State	Gulfport, Mississippi
G	2	Ramiah "Moonie" Augurson	6 ft 1 in (1.85 m)	Fr	Wossman High School	Monroe, Louisiana
G	3	Jakayla Johnson	5 ft 9 in (1.75 m)	GS	Louisiana–Monroe	Clinton, Mississippi
G	6	Brikayla Gray	5 ft 8 in (1.73 m)	GS	Louisiana–Monroe	New Hebron, Mississippi
G	8	Meloney Thames	5 ft 8 in (1.73 m)	GS	Louisiana–Monroe	Philadelphia, Mississippi
G	10	Miriam Prince	5 ft 7 in (1.7 m)	Jr	Louisiana–Monroe	Philadelphia, Mississippi
G	12	Morgan Sieper	6 ft 0 in (1.83 m)	Jr	H.B. Plant High School	Tampa, Florida
F	20	Je'Mya Evans	6 ft 0 in (1.83 m)	Sr	Mississippi Gulf Coast Community College	Gulfport, Mississippi
PG	21	Carly Keats	5 ft 7 in (1.7 m)	Sr	Arkansas	Philadelphia, Mississippi
F	22	Sakyia White	6 ft 1 in (1.85 m)	GS	Louisiana–Monroe	Tuscaloosa, Alabama
G	23	Hayleigh Breland	5 ft 8 in (1.73 m)	Sr	Charlotte	Wiggins, Mississippi
C	32	Timya Thurman	6 ft 5 in (1.96 m)	Jr	Auburn	Linden, Alabama
C	35	Whitney Hart	6 ft 3 in (1.91 m)	RS Fr	Liberty Magnet High School	Baton Rouge, Louisiana

Head coach

- Missy Bilderback (Southern Miss)

Assistant coach(es)

- Lauren Pittman (Southern Miss)
- Jonathan Williams (Faulkner)
- Lauren Gross (Louisiana–Monroe)

Legend

- (C) Team captain
- (S) Suspended
- (I) Ineligible
- (W) Walk-on
- Injured
- Current redshirt

Roster
Last update: July 21, 2026

== Schedule and results ==
Date time, TV	Rank^{#}	Opponent^{#}	Result	Record	High points	High rebounds	High assists	Site (attendance) city, state
Regular season
November 3, 2025*; 6:00 pm, ESPN+		Northern Illinois; MAC-SBC Challenge	W 77–56	1–0	16 – Thames	9 – White	5 – Johnson	Reed Green Coliseum (1,620); Hattiesburg, MS
November 7, 2025*; 11:00 am, ESPN+		William Carey; The Mayor's Cup	W 92–80	2–0	18 – Thames	6 – White	8 – Breland	Reed Green Coliseum (4,189); Hattiesburg, MS
November 10, 2025*; 6:00 pm, ESPN+		Blue Mountain Christian	W 113–39	3–0	17 – Augurson	10 – Evans	5 – Thames	Reed Green Coliseum (1,407); Hattiesburg, MS
November 13, 2025*; 6:30 pm, ESPN+		at Jacksonville State	W 67–61	4–0	17 – Johnson	8 – Tied	4 – Keats	Pete Mathews Coliseum (1,167); Jacksonville, AL
November 18, 2025*; 5:00 pm, ESPN+		Southeastern Louisiana	W 86−53	5−0	17 – Keats	12 – Johnson	5 – Breland	Reed Green Coliseum (3,553); Hattiesburg, MS
November 22, 2025*; 2:00 pm, ESPN+		Nicholls	W 86−60	6−0	23 – Keats	8 – Thames	4 – Gray	Reed Green Coliseum (3,121); Hattiesburg, MS
November 27, 2025*; 5:30 pm, FloCollege		vs. UAB; Cancún Challenge Riviera Tournament	L 72–77	6–1	17 – Johnson	11 – Breland	4 – Breland	Hard Rock Hotel Riviera Maya (100); Cancún, Mexico
November 28, 2025*; 3:00 pm, FloCollege		vs. No. 25 NC State; Cancún Challenge Riviera Tournament	L 56–110	6–2	12 – Tied	8 – Gray	3 – Keats	Hard Rock Hotel Riviera Maya; Cancún, Mexico
December 1, 2025*; 6:30 pm, ACCNX		at SMU	L 70–83	6–3	24 – White	13 – White	3 – Tied	Moody Coliseum (1,056); University Park, TX
December 7, 2025*; 2:00 pm, ESPN+		UAB	W 81–73	7–3	25 – Breland	6 – Tied	6 – Keats	Reed Green Coliseum (1,576); Hattiesburg, MS
December 14, 2025*; 2:00 pm, SECN+		at Mississippi State	L 64–87	7–4	24 – Breland	7 – White	4 – Tied	Humphrey Coliseum (3,833); Starkville, MS
December 18, 2025; 5:00 pm, ESPN+		South Alabama	W 84−65	8−4 (1–0)	20 – Johnson	12 – White	8 – Keats	Reed Green Coliseum; Hattiesburg, MS
December 20, 2025; 1:00 pm, ESPN+		Louisiana	W 76–58	9–4 (2–0)	20 – Johnson	9 – Breland	3 – Tied	Reed Green Coliseum; Hattiesburg, MS
January 1, 2026; 6:00 pm, ESPN+		Arkansas State	L 83–91	9–5 (2–1)	26 – Johnson	15 – White	2 – Tied	Reed Green Coliseum (1,178); Hattiesburg, MS
January 3, 2026; 2:00 pm, ESPN+		Troy	W 98–95	10–5 (3–1)	30 – Johnson	14 – White	4 – Johnson	Reed Green Coliseum (1,550); Hattiesburg, MS
January 10, 2026; 12:00 pm, ESPN+		at Appalachian State	L 59–82	10–6 (3–2)	23 – Johnson	9 – Hart	1 – Tied	Holmes Center (641); Boone, NC
January 14, 2026; 11:00 am, ESPN+		at Texas State	W 76–62	11–6 (4–2)	17 – Tied	8 – Tied	3 – Tied	Strahan Arena (2,858); San Marcos, TX
January 17, 2026; 2:00 pm, ESPN+		at Arkansas State	L 71–81	11–7 (4–3)	17 – Tied	14 – Hart	3 – Keats	First National Bank Arena (2,067); Jonesboro, AR
January 22, 2026; 5:00 pm, ESPN+		Marshall	L 52–61	11–8 (4–4)	17 – Thames	14 – Hart	3 – Tied	Reed Green Coliseum (1,343); Hattiesburg, MS
January 24, 2026; 12:00 pm, ESPN+		Coastal Carolina	L 55–81	11–9 (4–5)	15 – Thames	13 – Hart	4 – Thames	Reed Green Coliseum (1,441); Hattiesburg, MS
January 28, 2026; 5:00 pm, ESPN+		at Georgia Southern	L 67–70	11–10 (4–6)	21 – Keats	7 – Gray	3 – Thames	Hill Convocation Center (1,232); Statesboro, GA
January 30, 2026; 5:30 pm, ESPN+		at Old Dominion	W 86–83 ^{OT}	12–10 (5–6)	30 – Johnson	8 – Johnson	2 – Tied	Chartway Arena (2,167); Norfolk, VA
February 4, 2026; 6:00 pm, ESPN+		James Madison	L 72–83	12–11 (5–7)	22 – Johnson	10 – Hart	4 – Breland	Reed Green Coliseum (1,467); Hattiesburg, MS
February 7, 2026*; 1:00 pm, ESPN+		at Toledo; MAC-SBC Challenge	L 67–76	12–12	25 – Thames	9 – Hart	1 – Tied	Savage Arena (4,296); Toledo, OH
February 12, 2026; 5:00 pm, ESPN+		Louisiana–Monroe	L 62–85	12–13 (5–8)	18 – Thames	9 – Augurson	2 – Tied	Reed Green Coliseum (2,846); Hattiesburg, MS
February 14, 2026; 5:00 pm, ESPN+		Texas State	W 86–77	13–13 (6–8)	27 – Johnson	8 – Hart	3 – Thames	Reed Green Coliseum (2,821); Hattiesburg, MS
February 18, 2026; 6:00 pm, ESPN+		at Louisiana	W 83–61	14–13 (7–8)	26 – Keats	8 – Gray	4 – Tied	Cajundome (628); Lafayette, LA
February 21, 2026; 1:00 pm, ESPN+		at Troy	L 80–97	14–14 (7–9)	24 – Thames	10 – Hart	4 – Thames	Trojan Arena (1,807); Troy, AL
February 25, 2026; 5:00 pm, ESPN+		at South Alabama	L 43–57	14–15 (7–10)	13 – Breland	9 – Gray	2 – Thames	Mitchell Center; Mobile, AL
February 27, 2026; 6:30 pm, ESPN+		at Louisiana–Monroe	W 68–61	15–15 (8–10)	32 – Johnson	9 – Breland	4 – Breland	Fant–Ewing Coliseum (1,282); Monroe, LA
Sun Belt tournament
March 5, 2026; 2:00 pm, ESPN+	(7)	vs. (10) Louisiana–Monroe; Third Round	L 72–89	15–16	25 – Johnson	6 – Tied	4 – Tied	Pensacola Bay Center (490); Pensacola, FL
*Non-conference game. ^{#}Rankings from AP Poll. (#) Tournament seedings in parentheses. All times are in Central.
