= Louisiana–Monroe Warhawks basketball =

Louisiana–Monroe Warhawks basketball may refer to either of the basketball teams that represent the University of Louisiana at Monroe:

- Louisiana–Monroe Warhawks men's basketball
- Louisiana–Monroe Warhawks women's basketball
