= 2025–26 Georgia State Panthers women's basketball team =

American college basketball season

2025–26 Georgia State Panthers women's basketball
- Conference: Sun Belt Conference
- Record: 10–21 (5–13 Sun Belt)
- Head coach: Gene Hill (8th season)
- Associate head coach: Jon Bollier; Shanasa Sanders
- Assistant coach: Patechia Hartman
- Home arena: GSU Convocation Center

2025–26 Sun Belt Conference women's basketball standings
	Conf.				Overall
Team	W		L	PCT	W		L	PCT
Georgia Southern	16	–	2	.889	23	–	8	.742
Troy	15	–	3	.833	25	–	8	.758
Arkansas State	14	–	4	.778	27	–	10	.730
James Madison †	14	–	4	.778	26	–	9	.743
Marshall	13	–	5	.722	28	–	9	.757
Old Dominion	9	–	9	.500	18	–	14	.563
Southern Miss	8	–	10	.444	15	–	16	.484
Texas State	7	–	11	.389	11	–	19	.367
Coastal Carolina	7	–	11	.389	14	–	18	.438
Louisiana–Monroe	7	–	11	.389	17	–	16	.515
Georgia State	5	–	13	.278	10	–	21	.323
South Alabama	5	–	13	.278	17	–	19	.472
Appalachian State	4	–	14	.222	11	–	19	.367
Louisiana	2	–	16	.111	5	–	26	.161
† 2026 Sun Belt tournament winner

The 2025–26 Georgia State Panthers women's basketball team represented Georgia State University during the 2025–26 NCAA Division I women's basketball season. The Panthers, led by eighth-year head coach Gene Hill, played their home games at the GSU Convocation Center in Atlanta, Georgia as members of the Sun Belt Conference.

== Previous season ==
The Panthers finished the 2024–25 season 17–16, 8–10 in Sun Belt play, to finish in eighth place. They defeated Georgia Southern, and Old Dominion, before falling to Coastal Carolina in the quarterfinals of the Sun Belt tournament.

== Preseason ==
On October 20, 2025, the Sun Belt Conference released their preseason poll. Georgia State was picked to finish seventh in the conference.

=== Preseason rankings ===
Sun Belt Preseason Poll
Place	Team	Votes
1	James Madison	189 (9)
2	Arkansas State	174 (3)
3	Troy	171 (1)
4	Old Dominion	151 (1)
5	Southern Miss	125
6	Coastal Carolina	104
7	Georgia State	102
8	Marshall	100
9	Appalachian State	94
10	Georgia Southern	73
11	Louisiana	67
12	Texas State	55
13	Louisiana–Monroe	36
14	South Alabama	29
(#) first-place votes

=== Preseason All-Sun Belt Teams ===
Preseason All-Sun Belt Teams
Team	Player	Year	Position
Second	Crystal Henderson	Junior	Guard

== Roster ==
2025–26 Georgia State Panthers women's basketball team
Players
Coaches

Pos.	#	Name	Height	Year	Previous school	Hometown
G	0	Morgan Robinson-Nwagwu	5 ft 7 in (1.7 m)	GS	UCF	Norcross, Georgia
G	1	Savannah Robinson-Holmes	5 ft 6 in (1.68 m)	Fr	Langston Hughes High School	Columbus, Ohio
F	2	Ana Luiza Ramos Pires	6 ft 0 in (1.83 m)	Jr	Garden City Community College	São Paulo, Brazil
G	5	Eghosa Obasuyi	5 ft 4 in (1.63 m)	Jr	Carrollton High School	Villa Rica, Georgia
F	8	Nari Powers	6 ft 0 in (1.83 m)	So	Salt Lake Community College	Gurnee, Illinois
G/F	10	Monna Julkunen	5 ft 11 in (1.8 m)	So	Rabun Gap-Nacoochee School	Vantaa, Finland
G	13	Cheyenne Holloman	5 ft 8 in (1.73 m)	GS	Northwest Florida State College	Marietta, Georgia
F	23	Ari Dyson	5 ft 11 in (1.8 m)	Jr	Trinity Valley Community College	McDonough, Georgia
G	27	Gabbie Grooms	5 ft 8 in (1.73 m)	So	Georgia Tech	Peachtree City, Georgia
G	30	Crystal Henderson	5 ft 4 in (1.63 m)	Jr	Kell High School	Marietta, Georgia
G	31	Kaleigh Addie	5 ft 6 in (1.68 m)	Sr	Xavier	Atlanta, Georgia
G	33	Frankee Payne	5 ft 3 in (1.6 m)	So	South Gwinnett High School	Snellville, Georgia
G	42	Grace Lanier	5 ft 5 in (1.65 m)	Fr	Xaverian High School	New York, New York

Head coach

- Gene Hill (Coker)

Assistant coach(es)

- Jon Bollier (Samford)
- Shanasa Sanders (Stetson)
- Patechia Hartman (Georgia State)

Legend

- (C) Team captain
- (S) Suspended
- (I) Ineligible
- (W) Walk-on
- Injured
- Current redshirt

Roster
Last update: July 26, 2026

== Schedule and results ==
Date time, TV	Rank^{#}	Opponent^{#}	Result	Record	High points	High rebounds	High assists	Site (attendance) city, state
Regular season
November 3, 2025*; 6:30 pm, ESPN+		Oglethorpe	W 108–59	1–0	24 – Henderson	11 – Robinson-Nwagwu	6 – Holloman	GSU Convocation Center (732); Atlanta, GA
November 7, 2025*; 12:00 pm, SECN+		at Mississippi State	L 62–88	1–1	19 – Henderson	5 – Robinson-Nwagwu	5 – Henderson	Humphrey Coliseum (6,549); Starkville, MS
November 11, 2025*; 7:00 pm, ESPN+		at Wofford	W 75–68	2–1	19 – Henderson	7 – Robinson-Nwagwu	8 – Henderson	Jerry Richardson Indoor Stadium (440); Spartanburg, SC
November 13, 2025*; 7:00 pm, ESPN+		at Furman	L 89–90 ^{OT}	2–2	25 – Robinson-Nwagwu	7 – Tied	4 – Henderson	Timmons Arena (474); Greenville, SC
November 17, 2025*; 7:00 pm, SECN+		at Auburn	L 65–69	2–3	18 – Tied	9 – Robinson-Nwagwu	5 – Robinson-Nwagwu	Neville Arena (2,765); Auburn, AL
November 24, 2025*; 12:00 pm, ESPN+		Stony Brook; GSU Thanksgiving Tournament	W 62−61	3−3	19 – Henderson	5 – Tied	3 – Henderson	GSU Convocation Center (1,154); Atlanta, GA
November 25, 2025*; 12:00 pm, ESPN+		Samford; GSU Thanksgiving Tournament	W 69−64	4−3	21 – Robinson-Nwagwu	9 – Robinson-Nwagwu	3 – Grooms	GSU Convocation Center (1,207); Atlanta, GA
November 26, 2025*; 12:00 pm, ESPN+		Central Arkansas; GSU Thanksgiving Tournament	L 51–70	4–4	11 – Henderson	6 – Holloman	3 – Lanier	GSU Convocation Center (1,130); Atlanta, GA
December 5, 2025*; 7:00 pm, ESPN+		at FIU	L 92–103	4–5	17 – Addie	5 – Dyson	10 – Henderson	Ocean Bank Convocation Center (146); Miami, FL
December 7, 2025*; 2:00 pm, ESPN+		at Miami (FL)	L 46–99	4–6	10 – Henderson	2 – Tied	4 – Henderson	Watsco Center (1,021); Coral Gables, FL
December 14, 2025*; 2:00 pm, ESPN+		Kennesaw State	L 63–69	4–7	20 – Henderson	7 – Dyson	5 – Henderson	GSU Convocation Center (859); Atlanta, GA
December 18, 2025; 5:00 pm, ESPN+		at Georgia Southern; Modern Day Hate	L 47–68	4–8 (0–1)	8 – Dyson	7 – Holloman	3 – Lanier	Hill Convocation Center (1,026); Statesboro, GA
December 20, 2025; 1:00 pm, ESPN+		at Coastal Carolina	W 68−63	5−8 (1–1)	14 – Henderson	7 – Holloman	4 – Holloman	HTC Center (707); Conway, SC
December 28, 2025*; 2:00 pm, ESPN+		LaGrange	W 85–55	6–8	14 – Tied	6 – Tied	7 – Henderson	GSU Convocation Center (893); Atlanta, GA
January 1, 2026; 2:00 pm, ESPN+		at James Madison	L 64–84	6–9 (1–2)	13 – Tied	6 – Robinson-Nwagwu	2 – Henderson	Atlantic Union Bank Center (2,025); Harrisonburg, VA
January 3, 2026; 1:00 pm, ESPN+		at Old Dominion	L 68–73	6–10 (1–3)	19 – Henderson	4 – Tied	5 – Henderson	Chartway Arena (1,474); Norfolk, VA
January 10, 2026; 1:00 pm, ESPN+		James Madison	W 72–70 ^{OT}	7–10 (2–3)	16 – Henderson	6 – Robinson-Nwagwu	5 – Henderson	GSU Convocation Center (983); Atlanta, GA
January 14, 2026; 6:30 pm, ESPN+		Georgia Southern; Modern Day Hate	L 55–66	7–11 (2–4)	17 – Henderson	8 – Robinson-Nwagwu	2 – Tied	GSU Convocation Center (982); Atlanta, GA
January 17, 2026; 2:00 pm, ESPN+		Appalachian State	W 79–57	8–11 (3–4)	27 – Henderson	6 – Robinson-Nwagwu	3 – Tied	GSU Convocation Center (768); Atlanta, GA
January 22, 2026; 8:00 pm, ESPN+		at South Alabama	W 78–75 ^{OT}	9–11 (4–4)	22 – Henderson	10 – Dyson	7 – Henderson	Mitchell Center (366); Mobile, AL
January 24, 2026; 12:00 pm, ESPN+		at Troy	L 69–96	9–12 (4–5)	17 – Henderson	6 – Powers	5 – Lanier	Trojan Arena (1,409); Troy, AL
January 29, 2026; 11:00 am, ESPN+		Arkansas State	L 61–69	9–13 (4–6)	10 – Henderson	8 – Robinson-Nwagwu	3 – Tied	GSU Convocation Center (6,762); Atlanta, GA
January 31, 2026; 2:00 pm, ESPN+		Texas State	L 59–68	9–14 (4–7)	21 – Henderson	8 – Holloman	4 – Henderson	GSU Convocation Center (560); Atlanta, GA
February 4, 2026; 7:30 pm, ESPN+		at Louisiana–Monroe	L 62–81	9–15 (4–8)	22 – Henderson	4 – Tied	4 – Henderson	Fant–Ewing Coliseum (1,048); Monroe, LA
February 12, 2026; 6:00 pm, ESPN+		at Marshall	L 56–71	9–16 (4–9)	16 – Lanier	6 – Dyson	4 – Lanier	Cam Henderson Center (997); Huntington, WV
February 14, 2026; 2:00 pm, ESPN+		at Appalachian State	L 67–73 ^{OT}	9–17 (4–10)	23 – Lanier	7 – Dyson	4 – Lanier	Holmes Center (513); Boone, NC
February 19, 2026; 5:30 pm, ESPN+		Old Dominion	L 75–88	9–18 (4–11)	19 – Henderson	8 – Dyson	4 – Henderson	GSU Convocation Center (1,459); Atlanta, GA
February 21, 2026; 1:00 pm, ESPN+		Marshall	L 75–82	9–19 (4–12)	20 – Addie	13 – Dyson	5 – Henderson	GSU Convocation Center (1,176); Atlanta, GA
February 24, 2026; 5:00 pm, ESPN+		Coastal Carolina	L 84–92 ^{OT}	9–20 (4–13)	21 – Henderson	8 – Tied	4 – Henderson	GSU Convocation Center (583); Atlanta, GA
February 27, 2026; 5:00 pm, ESPN+		Louisiana	W 74–68	10–20 (5–13)	23 – Lanier	9 – Holloman	8 – Henderson	GSU Convocation Center (793); Atlanta, GA
Sun Belt tournament
March 3, 2026; 3:00 pm, ESPN+	(11)	vs. (14) Louisiana; First Round	L 66–71	10–21	22 – Henderson	13 – Dyson	4 – Lanier	Pensacola Bay Center (426); Pensacola, FL
*Non-conference game. ^{#}Rankings from AP Poll. (#) Tournament seedings in parentheses. All times are in Eastern.
