= 2025–26 Georgia Southern Eagles women's basketball team =

American college basketball season

2025–26 Georgia Southern Eagles women's basketball

Sun Belt regular-season champions

WBIT, First Round
- Conference: Sun Belt Conference
- Record: 23–8 (16–2 Sun Belt)
- Head coach: Hana Haden (2nd season)
- Assistant coaches: Dexter Jenkins; Tiffany Conner; Dee Anderson
- Home arena: Hill Convocation Center

2025–26 Sun Belt Conference women's basketball standings
	Conf.				Overall
Team	W		L	PCT	W		L	PCT
Georgia Southern	16	–	2	.889	23	–	8	.742
Troy	15	–	3	.833	25	–	8	.758
Arkansas State	14	–	4	.778	27	–	10	.730
James Madison †	14	–	4	.778	26	–	9	.743
Marshall	13	–	5	.722	28	–	9	.757
Old Dominion	9	–	9	.500	18	–	14	.563
Southern Miss	8	–	10	.444	15	–	16	.484
Texas State	7	–	11	.389	11	–	19	.367
Coastal Carolina	7	–	11	.389	14	–	18	.438
Louisiana–Monroe	7	–	11	.389	17	–	16	.515
Georgia State	5	–	13	.278	10	–	21	.323
South Alabama	5	–	13	.278	17	–	19	.472
Appalachian State	4	–	14	.222	11	–	19	.367
Louisiana	2	–	16	.111	5	–	26	.161
† 2026 Sun Belt tournament winner

The 2025–26 Georgia Southern Eagles women's basketball team represented Georgia Southern University during the 2025–26 NCAA Division I women's basketball season. The Eagles, led by second-year head coach Hana Haden, played their home games at the Hill Convocation Center in Statesboro, Georgia as members of the Sun Belt Conference.

== Previous season ==
The Eagles finished the 2024–25 season 16–18, 6–12 in Sun Belt play, to finish in a tie for 11th place. They defeated Southern Miss, and Louisiana–Monroe, before falling to Georgia State in the third round of the Sun Belt tournament.

== Preseason ==
On October 20, 2025, the Sun Belt Conference released their preseason poll. Georgia Southern was picked to finish tenth in the conference.

=== Preseason rankings ===
Sun Belt Preseason Poll
Place	Team	Votes
1	James Madison	189 (9)
2	Arkansas State	174 (3)
3	Troy	171 (1)
4	Old Dominion	151 (1)
5	Southern Miss	125
6	Coastal Carolina	104
7	Georgia State	102
8	Marshall	100
9	Appalachian State	94
10	Georgia Southern	73
11	Louisiana	67
12	Texas State	55
13	Louisiana–Monroe	36
14	South Alabama	29
(#) first-place votes

=== Preseason All-Sun Belt Teams ===
No players were named to the Preseason All-Sun Belt First, Second, or Third Teams.

== Roster ==
2025–26 Georgia Southern Eagles women's basketball team
Players
Coaches

Pos.	#	Name	Height	Year	Previous school	Hometown
G	0	Destiny Garrett	5 ft 4 in (1.63 m)	GS	Georgia Southwestern State	Bessemer, Alabama
G	3	Nevaeh Brown	5 ft 10 in (1.78 m)	So	Paris Junior College	Columbia, Maryland
G	4	Shanti Simmons	5 ft 9 in (1.75 m)	GS	Georgia Southwestern State	Eatonton, Georgia
G	5	Kyla Bryant	5 ft 7 in (1.7 m)	Jr	North Carolina Central	Salisbury, North Carolina
G/F	10	Jamiria Jones	5 ft 9 in (1.75 m)	So	Huffman High School	Birmingham, Alabama
F	12	Liv Fuller	5 ft 10 in (1.78 m)	Jr	Clearwater High School	Clearwater, Florida
C	13	Courtenay Lee	6 ft 4 in (1.93 m)	Jr	Yavapai College	Mesa, Arizona
G	15	Armani Cooke	5 ft 9 in (1.75 m)	Jr	Georgia Southwestern State	Statesboro, Georgia
F	20	Lia Anderson	6 ft 1 in (1.85 m)	Jr	Wingate	LaPlace, Louisiana
F	21	Laney Scoggins	5 ft 11 in (1.8 m)	Jr	Presbyterian	Leland, North Carolina
G	22	Destini Ward	5 ft 8 in (1.73 m)	RS Jr	Saint Francis (PA)	Baltimore, Maryland
F	23	McKayla Hosley	6 ft 0 in (1.83 m)	Fr	St. Anne School	Columbus, Georgia
G/F	24	Kishyah Anderson	5 ft 10 in (1.78 m)	Sr	Presbyterian	Phoenix, Arizona
G	30	McKenna Eddings (5th)	6 ft 0 in (1.83 m)	Sr	Auburn	Williamsburg, Virginia
F	41	Kayla Cleaveland	6 ft 0 in (1.83 m)	Fr	River Ridge High School	Woodstock, Georgia

Head coach

- Hana Haden (Western Carolina)

Assistant coach(es)

- Dexter Jenkins (North Carolina Central)
- Tiffany Conner (South Florida)
- Dee Anderson (Florida)

Legend

- (C) Team captain
- (S) Suspended
- (I) Ineligible
- (W) Walk-on
- (5th) Fifth-year senior
- Injured
- Current redshirt

Roster
Last update: July 19, 2026

== Schedule and results ==
Date time, TV	Rank^{#}	Opponent^{#}	Result	Record	High points	High rebounds	High assists	Site (attendance) city, state
Regular season
November 3, 2025*; 6:00 pm, ESPN+		Central Michigan; MAC/SBC Challenge	W 98–72	1–0	22 – Garrett	7 – Garrett	9 – Garrett	Hill Convocation Center (852); Statesboro, GA
November 6, 2025*; 6:00 pm, ACCNX		at Florida State	L 72–80	1–1	24 – Simmons	10 – Simmons	5 – Garrett	Donald L. Tucker Center (1,660); Tallahassee, FL
November 9, 2025*; 2:00 pm, ESPN+		No. 5 LSU	L 70–118	1–2	18 – Bryant	6 – Fuller	6 – Garrett	Hill Convocation Center (5,322); Statesboro, GA
November 18, 2025*; 7:30 pm, ESPN+		at Missouri State	L 58–69	1–3	15 – Eddings	5 – Tied	4 – Eddings	Great Southern Bank Arena (2,080); Springfield, MO
November 22, 2025*; 6:00 pm, ESPN+		Mercer	W 93−72	2−3	18 – Simmons	9 – Simmons	4 – Tied	Hill Convocation Center (876); Statesboro, GA
November 25, 2025*; 5:00 pm, ESPN+		at Charleston Southern	W 65−57	3−3	24 – Garrett	10 – Garrett	3 – K. Anderson	Buccaneer Field House (356); North Charleston, SC
November 30, 2025*; 2:00 pm, ESPN+		at Wofford	W 58–52	4–3	16 – Simmons	9 – Simmons	4 – Eddings	Jerry Richardson Indoor Stadium (340); Spartanburg, SC
December 4, 2025*; 6:00 pm, ESPN+		North Florida	W 70–44	5–3	24 – Garrett	8 – K. Anderson	5 – Eddings	Hill Convocation Center (656); Statesboro, GA
December 7, 2025*; 2:00 pm, ESPN+		Furman	W 72–56	6–3	17 – Tied	11 – Simmons	4 – Garrett	Hill Convocation Center (874); Statesboro, GA
December 12, 2025*; 11:00 am, ESPN+		Coastal Georgia	W 136–74	7–3	35 – Cleaveland	9 – Tied	9 – Garrett	Hill Convocation Center (4,167); Statesboro, GA
December 18, 2025; 5:00 pm, ESPN+		Georgia State; Modern Day Hate	W 68–47	8–3 (1–0)	16 – Eddings	8 – Tied	6 – Simmons	Hill Convocation Center (1,026); Statesboro, GA
December 20, 2025; 1:00 pm, ESPN+		Appalachian State	W 67−54	9−3 (2–0)	20 – K. Anderson	9 – Simmons	4 – Simmons	Hill Convocation Center (847); Statesboro, GA
January 1, 2026; 2:00 pm, ESPN+		at Old Dominion	L 84–87 ^{2OT}	9–4 (2–1)	23 – K. Anderson	7 – Eddings	8 – Garrett	Chartway Arena (1,869); Norfolk, VA
January 3, 2026; 3:30 pm, ESPN+		at Coastal Carolina	W 60–50	10–4 (3–1)	15 – Eddings	8 – Simmons	3 – Simmons	HTC Center (593); Conway, SC
January 7, 2026; 6:00 pm, ESPN+		James Madison	W 78–70	11–4 (4–1)	26 – K. Anderson	10 – Simmons	4 – Simmons	Hill Convocation Center (731); Statesboro, GA
January 10, 2026; 1:00 pm, ESPN+		Old Dominion	W 77–60	12–4 (5–1)	23 – Garrett	9 – K. Anderson	5 – Garrett	Hill Convocation Center (1,032); Statesboro, GA
January 14, 2026; 6:30 pm, ESPN+		at Georgia State; Modern Day Hate	W 66–55	13–4 (6–1)	17 – Eddings	7 – Eddings	7 – Garrett	GSU Convocation Center (982); Atlanta, GA
January 17, 2026; 1:00 pm, ESPN+		at James Madison	L 60–67	13–5 (6–2)	14 – Eddings	6 – Jones	5 – Garrett	Atlantic Union Bank Center (2,172); Harrisonburg, VA
January 22, 2026; 7:00 pm, ESPN+		at Troy	W 80–69	14–5 (7–2)	29 – Garrett	7 – K. Anderson	6 – Simmons	Trojan Arena (1,378); Troy, AL
January 24, 2026; 2:00 pm, ESPN+		at South Alabama	W 69–46	15–5 (8–2)	18 – Tied	12 – L. Anderson	3 – Garrett	Mitchell Center (435); Mobile, AL
January 28, 2026; 6:00 pm, ESPN+		Southern Miss	W 70–67	16–5 (9–2)	31 – K. Anderson	8 – Simmons	5 – Eddings	Hill Convocation Center (1,232); Statesboro, GA
February 4, 2026; 8:00 pm, ESPN+		at Texas State	W 61–57	17–5 (10–2)	17 – Garrett	6 – L. Anderson	2 – Tied	Strahan Arena (964); San Marcos, TX
February 7, 2026*; 1:00 pm, ESPN+		at Miami (OH); MAC/SBC Challenge	L 67–78	17–6	19 – Eddings	7 – Tied	2 – Tied	Millett Hall (507); Oxford, OH
February 11, 2026; 5:00 pm, ESPN+		Arkansas State	W 69–60	18–6 (11–2)	21 – K. Anderson	11 – K. Anderson	5 – Eddings	Hill Convocation Center (1,872); Statesboro, GA
February 14, 2026; 1:00 pm, ESPN+		Coastal Carolina	W 67–56	19–6 (12–2)	23 – K. Anderson	10 – K. Anderson	5 – Eddings	Hill Convocation Center (1,023); Statesboro, GA
February 19, 2026; 6:00 pm, ESPN+		Marshall	W 76–55	20–6 (13–2)	23 – K. Anderson	10 – K. Anderson	4 – Bryant	Hill Convocation Center (1,009); Statesboro, GA
February 21, 2026; 1:00 pm, ESPN+		Louisiana–Monroe	W 67–54	21–6 (14–2)	22 – Garrett	8 – Jones	3 – K. Anderson	Hill Convocation Center (1,203); Statesboro, GA
February 25, 2026; 6:30 pm, ESPN+		at Appalachian State	W 62–48	22–6 (15–2)	14 – Cleaveland	8 – Tied	4 – Bryant	Holmes Center (638); Boone, NC
February 27, 2026; 6:00 pm, ESPN+		at Marshall	W 78–72 ^{OT}	23–6 (16–2)	20 – K. Anderson	9 – Tied	7 – Garrett	Cam Henderson Center (2,543); Huntington, WV
Sun Belt tournament
March 8, 2026; 12:30 pm, ESPN+	(1)	vs. (4) James Madison; Semifinals	L 53–81	23–7	17 – Bryant	5 – Cleaveland	3 – Garrett	Pensacola Bay Center (709); Pensacola, FL
WBIT
March 19, 2026*; 7:00 pm, ESPN+		at (2) Miami (FL); First Round	L 56–82	23–8	20 – K. Anderson	5 – Bryant	6 – Garrett	Watsco Center (601); Coral Gables, FL
*Non-conference game. ^{#}Rankings from AP Poll. (#) Tournament seedings in parentheses. All times are in Eastern.
