= 2025–26 James Madison Dukes women's basketball team =

Season of US college basketball team

2025–26 James Madison Dukes women's basketball

Sun Belt tournament champions

NCAA tournament, first round
- Conference: Sun Belt Conference
- Record: 26–9 (14–4 Sun Belt)
- Head coach: Sean O'Regan (10th season)
- Assistant coaches: Kayla Cooper-Williams; Alex Tomlinson; Nicole Razor; Anastasiia Zakharova
- Home arena: Atlantic Union Bank Center

2025–26 Sun Belt Conference women's basketball standings
	Conf.				Overall
Team	W		L	PCT	W		L	PCT
Georgia Southern	16	–	2	.889	23	–	8	.742
Troy	15	–	3	.833	25	–	8	.758
Arkansas State	14	–	4	.778	27	–	10	.730
James Madison †	14	–	4	.778	26	–	9	.743
Marshall	13	–	5	.722	28	–	9	.757
Old Dominion	9	–	9	.500	18	–	14	.563
Southern Miss	8	–	10	.444	15	–	16	.484
Texas State	7	–	11	.389	11	–	19	.367
Coastal Carolina	7	–	11	.389	14	–	18	.438
Louisiana–Monroe	7	–	11	.389	17	–	16	.515
Georgia State	5	–	13	.278	10	–	21	.323
South Alabama	5	–	13	.278	17	–	19	.472
Appalachian State	4	–	14	.222	11	–	19	.367
Louisiana	2	–	16	.111	5	–	26	.161
† 2026 Sun Belt tournament winner

The 2025–26 James Madison Dukes women's basketball team represented the James Madison University during the 2025–26 NCAA Division I women's basketball season. The Dukes, led by tenth-year head coach Sean O'Regan, played their home games at the Atlantic Union Bank Center in Harrisonburg, Virginia as members of the Sun Belt Conference.

== Previous season ==
The Dukes finished the 2024–25 season 30–6 record, 18–0 in Sun Belt play, to finish in first place. In the Sun Belt tournament, they defeated fourth seed Coastal Carolina in the semifinals before finishing off second-seeded Arkansas State in the championship game. In the WBIT, the Dukes beat Davidson and Marquette in the first and second rounds, respectively, before losing to Belmont in the quarterfinals. The Dukes set a program record for single-season wins with 30.

== Offseason ==
=== Departures ===
James Madison departures
Name	Num	Pos.	Height	Year	Hometown	Reason for departure
Olivia Mullins	1	G	5' 8"	(redshirt) Senior	Somerset, NJ	Graduated
Ro Scott	2	G	5' 8"	Graduate student	Earle, AR	Graduated
Alonna Poole	3	G	5' 11"	Freshman	Nashville, TN	TBD
Annalicia Goodman	14	F	6' 3"	(redshirt) Senior	Newport News, VA	Graduated
Jada Mills	15	G	5' 9"	Sophomore	Norwich, CT	Transferred to Saint Peter's
Mikaya Tynes	23	F	6' 1"	Senior	Norfolk, VA	Graduated
Jamia Hazell	25	G	5' 8"	(redshirt) Senior	Raleigh, NC	Graduated
Atiana Williams	31	G	5' 7"	Sophomore	Newport News, VA	Transferred to Christopher Newport
Kseniia Kozlova	35	C	6' 3"	(redshirt) Senior	Moscow, Russia	Graduated
Laura Molnárová	77	G	5' 11"	Freshman	Bratislava, Slovakia	Transferred to LIU

=== Incoming ===
James Madison incoming transfers
Name	Num	Pos.	Height	Year	Hometown	Previous school
Kylie Marshall	2	G	5' 11"	Junior	Mansfield, TX	SMU
Regina Walton	14	G	5' 3"	Senior	Capitol Heights, MD	Elon
Brianna McLeod	25	C	6' 3"	(redshirt) Junior	Brampton, ON	SMU

=== Recruiting classes ===
==== 2025 recruiting class ====
There was no recruiting class of 2025.

==== 2026 recruiting class ====
College recruiting
Name	Hometown	School	Height	Weight	Commit date
Maddie Leach; CG	Newport News, VA	Menchville High School	5 ft 9 in (1.75 m)	N/A	
Maddie Leach; CG	Recruit ratings: 247Sports:				
Overall recruit ranking:
Note: In many cases, Scout, Rivals, 247Sports, On3, and ESPN may conflict in their listings of height and weight.; In these cases, the average was taken. ESPN grades are on a 100-point scale.; Sources: "2026 Player Commits". ESPN. Archived from the original on October 6, 2025.

== Preseason ==
On October 20, 2025, the Sun Belt Conference released their preseason coaches poll. Marshall was picked to finish first in the Sun Belt regular season.

=== Preseason rankings ===
Sun Belt preseason poll
Predicted finish	Team	Votes (1st place)
1	James Madison	189 (9)
2	Arkansas State	174 (3)
3	Troy	171 (1)
4	Old Dominion	151 (1)
5	Southern Miss	125
6	Coastal Carolina	104
7	Georgia State	102
8	Marshall	100
9	Appalachian State	94
10	Georgia Southern	73
11	Louisiana	67
12	Texas State	55
13	Louisiana–Monroe	36
14	South Alabama	29

=== Preseason All-Sun Belt teams ===
Preseason All-Sun Belt teams
Team	Player	Position	Year
First	Peyton McDaniel	Guard	(redshirt) Senior
Second	Ashanti Barnes	Forward	Graduate student

Player of the Year: Peyton McDaniel, guard, RS-Sr.

== Roster ==
2025–26 James Madison Dukes women's basketball team
Players
Coaches

Pos.	#	Name	Height	Year	Previous school	Hometown
G	00	Peyton McDaniel	6 ft 0 in (1.83 m)	RS Sr	Twin Valley High School	Birdsboro, PA
G	2	Kylie Marshall	5 ft 11 in (1.8 m)	Jr	SMU	Mansfield, TX
G	4	Delilah Soltys	5 ft 11 in (1.8 m)	RS Fr	Mauldin High School	Fountain Inn, SC
F	5	Ashanti Barnes	6 ft 2 in (1.88 m)	GS	Trinity Valley Community College	Norfolk, VA
G/F	10	Angela Williams	6 ft 0 in (1.83 m)	So	Shades Valley High School	New Orleans, LA
G	11	Bree Robinson	5 ft 8 in (1.73 m)	Jr	Michigan State	Mississauga, ON
F	12	Angela Williams	6 ft 0 in (1.83 m)	Fr	Catholic High School	Virginia Beach, VA
G	13	Maddie Oliver	6 ft 0 in (1.83 m)	Fr	Norwell High School	Norwell, MA
G	14	Regina Walton	5 ft 3 in (1.6 m)	Sr	Elon	Capitol Heights, MD
G	21	Zakiya Stephenson	5 ft 4 in (1.63 m)	Jr	Ole Miss	Virginia Beach, VA
F	22	Grace McDonough	6 ft 2 in (1.88 m)	Fr	Lansdale Catholic High School	Harleysville, PA
F	25	Brianna McLeod	6 ft 3 in (1.91 m)	RS Jr	SMU	Brampton, ON

Head coach

- Sean O'Regan (James Madison)

Assistant coach(es)

- Kayla Cooper Williams (James Madison)
- Alex Tomlinson (Wingate)
- Nicole Razor (Elon)
- Anastasiia Zakharova (Charleston (WV))

Legend

- (C) Team captain
- (S) Suspended
- (I) Ineligible
- (W) Walk-on
- Injured
- Current redshirt

Roster
Last update: March 30, 2025

== Schedule and results ==
Date time, TV	Rank^{#}	Opponent^{#}	Result	Record	High points	High rebounds	High assists	Site (attendance) city, state
Regular season
November 3, 2025*; 6:00 p.m., ESPN+		Kent State; MAC–SBC Challenge	W 90–43	1–0	29 – McDaniel	11 – McLeod	5 – Stephenson	Atlantic Union Bank Center (2,036); Harrisonburg, VA
November 6, 2025*; 7:00 p.m., ESPN+		George Mason	L 57–72	1–1	21 – Barnes	16 – Barnes	4 – Stephenson	Atlantic Union Bank Center (2,365); Harrisonburg, VA
November 9, 2025*; 4:00 p.m., ESPN+		Queens	W 87–38	2–1	18 – Marshall	7 – Marshall	9 – Robinson	Atlantic Union Bank Center (2,057); Harrisonburg, VA
November 12, 2025*; 4:00 p.m., ESPN+		Liberty	W 74–61	3–1	29 – Barnes	11 – Barnes	8 – Stephenson	Atlantic Union Bank Center (1,971); Harrisonburg, VA
November 16, 2025*; 2:00 p.m., ESPN+		Villanova	L 73–84	3–2	23 – McDaniel	14 – McDaniel	3 – Soltys	Atlantic Union Bank Center (2,255); Harrisonburg, VA
November 19, 2025*; 8:00 p.m., SECN+/ESPN+		at No. 4 Texas	L 56–95	3–3	20 – McDaniel	6 – 2 tied	4 – Robinson	Moody Center (8,598); Austin, TX
November 23, 2025*; 2:00 p.m., ESPN+		Virginia Tech	W 65–56	4–3	19 – McDaniel	16 – Barnes	3 – 2 tied	Atlantic Union Bank Center (3,320); Harrisonburg, VA
November 28, 2025*; 11:00 a.m., Baller TV		vs. Boston College; Daytona Beach Classic	W 73–53	5–3	19 – McDaniel	9 – Barnes	10 – Stephenson	Ocean Center (110); Daytona Beach, FL
November 29, 2025*; 1:30 p.m., Baller TV		vs. Wisconsin; Daytona Beach Classic	W 69–50	6–3	28 – McDaniel	8 – 2 tied	7 – Stephenson	Ocean Center (157); Daytona Beach, FL
December 3, 2025*; 6:00 p.m., ESPN+		at East Carolina	W 83–66	7–3	22 – McDaniel	9 – McDaniel	6 – Robinson	Williams Arena (820); Greenville, NC
December 7, 2025*; 2:00 p.m., ESPN+		VCU	W 81–63	8–3	18 – Barnes	10 – McDaniel	6 – 2 tied	Atlantic Union Bank Center (2,170); Harrisonburg, VA
December 14, 2025*; 4:00 p.m., ESPN+		No. 19 Notre Dame	L 65–78	8–4	22 – Barnes	13 – Barnes	4 – 2 tied	Atlantic Union Bank Center (4,211); Harrisonburg, VA
December 17, 2025; 6:00 p.m., ESPN+		at Coastal Carolina	W 71–68	9–4 (1–0)	18 – Stephenson	9 – Barnes	5 – Robinson	HTC Center (508); Conway, SC
December 20, 2025; 6:00 p.m., ESPN+		at Marshall	L 74–83 ^{OT}	9–5 (1–1)	21 – Barnes	9 – Barnes	4 – 2 tied	Cam Henderson Center (994); Huntington, WV
January 1, 2026; 2:00 p.m., ESPN+		Georgia State	W 84–64	10–5 (2–1)	22 – Stephenson	12 – McDaniel	6 – Robinson	Atlantic Union Bank Center (2,025); Harrisonburg, VA
January 3, 2026; 2:00 p.m., ESPN+		Texas State	W 87–52	11–5 (3–1)	19 – McDaniel	7 – McDaniel	5 – Barnes	Atlantic Union Bank Center (2,085); Harrisonburg, VA
January 7, 2026; 6:00 p.m., ESPN+		at Georgia Southern	L 70–78	11–6 (3–2)	15 – Barnes	7 – McDaniel	2 – 3 tied	Hill Convocation Center (731); Statesboro, GA
January 10, 2026; 1:00 p.m., ESPN+		at Georgia State	L 70–72 ^{OT}	11–7 (3–3)	21 – McDaniel	14 – Barnes	4 – Stephenson	GSU Convocation Center (983); Atlanta, GA
January 15, 2026; 6:00 p.m., ESPN+		Marshall	W 80–43	12–7 (4–3)	19 – Robinson	15 – Barnes	7 – Stephenson	Atlantic Union Bank Center (1,929); Harrisonburg, VA
January 17, 2026; 1:00 p.m., ESPN+		Georgia Southern	W 67–60	13–7 (5–3)	22 – McDaniel	12 – McDaniel	4 – Stephenson	Atlantic Union Bank Center (2,172); Harrisonburg, VA
January 22, 2026; 7:00 p.m., ESPN+		at Louisiana–Monroe	W 72–68	14–7 (6–3)	21 – McDaniel	9 – Barnes	4 – 2 tied	Fant–Ewing Coliseum (1,167); Monroe, LA
January 25, 2026; 4:00 p.m., ESPN+		at Arkansas State	L 67–74	14–8 (6–4)	21 – McDaniel	12 – Barnes	3 – 3 tied	First National Bank Arena (1,167); Jonesboro, AR
January 29, 2026; 6:00 p.m., ESPN+		Louisiana	W 96–45	15–8 (7–4)	22 – Robinson	8 – McDaniel	6 – 2 tied	Atlantic Union Bank Center (1,988); Harrisonburg, VA
January 31, 2026; 1:00 p.m., ESPN+		South Alabama	W 88–52	16–8 (8–4)	22 – McDaniel	9 – Barnes	5 – 2 tied	Atlantic Union Bank Center (2,535); Harrisonburg, VA
February 4, 2026; 7:00 p.m., ESPN+		at Southern Miss	W 83–72	17–8 (9–4)	24 – McDaniel	9 – 2 tied	5 – 2 tied	Reed Green Coliseum (1,467); Hattiesburg, MS
February 8, 2026*; 12:00 p.m., CBSSN		at UMass; MAC–SBC Challenge	W 71–57	18–8	29 – McDaniel	11 – McDaniel	6 – Stephenson	Mullins Center (1,033); Amherst, MA
February 11, 2026; 6:30 p.m., ESPN+		at Appalachian State	W 83–72	19–8 (10–4)	15 – Barnes	9 – Barnes	4 – 2 tied	Holmes Center (443); Boone, NC
February 14, 2026; 6:30 p.m., ESPN+		at Old Dominion; Royal Rivalry	W 87–53	20–8 (11–4)	30 – Robinson	5 – McDonough	5 – Barnes	Chartway Arena (3,869); Norfolk, VA
February 21, 2026; 6:30 p.m., ESPN+		Appalachian State	W 74–48	21–8 (12–4)	23 – Barnes	11 – McDaniel	6 – Stephenson	Atlantic Union Bank Center (4,690); Harrisonburg, VA
February 25, 2026; 5:00 p.m., ESPN+		Old Dominion; Royal Rivalry	W 77–55	22–8 (13–4)	19 – 2 tied	14 – Barnes	5 – Stephenson	Atlantic Union Bank Center (2,068); Harrisonburg, VA
February 27, 2026; 5:00 p.m., ESPN+		Old Dominion	W 72–56	23–8 (14–4)	29 – Barnes	16 – Barnes	5 – 2 tied	Atlantic Union Bank Center (2,349); Harrisonburg, VA
Sun Belt tournament
March 7, 2026; 1:00 p.m., ESPN+	(4)	vs. (12) South Alabama; Quarterfinals	W 79–54	24–8	22 – McDaniel	5 – 2 tied	6 – Stephenson	Pensacola Bay Center (879); Pensacola, FL
March 8, 2026; 12:30 p.m., ESPN+	(4)	vs. (1) Georgia Southern; Semifinals	W 81–53	25–8	25 – McDaniel	10 – Barnes	6 – Stephenson	Pensacola Bay Center (709); Pensacola, FL
March 9, 2026; 2:00 p.m., ESPN2	(4)	vs. (2) Troy; Championship	W 69–52	26–8	28 – McDaniel	12 – Barnes	4 – 3 tied	Pensacola Bay Center (837); Pensacola, FL
NCAA tournament
March 21, 2026*; 2:30 p.m., ESPNU	(12 FW3)	vs. (5 FW3) No. 16 Kentucky; First round	L 56–71	26–9	16 – Barnes	7 – McDaniel	7 – 2 tied	Hope Coliseum; Morgantown, WV
*Non-conference game. ^{#}Rankings from AP poll. (#) Tournament seedings in parentheses. FW3=Fort Worth 3. All times are in Eastern.
