= 2025–26 Texas State Bobcats women's basketball team =

American college basketball season

2025–26 Texas State Bobcats women's basketball
- Conference: Sun Belt Conference
- Record: 11–19 (7–11 Sun Belt)
- Head coach: Zenarae Antoine (15th season)
- Assistant coaches: Jericka Jenkins; Paige Love; Barbara Farris; Octavia Barnes
- Home arena: Strahan Arena

2025–26 Sun Belt Conference women's basketball standings
	Conf.				Overall
Team	W		L	PCT	W		L	PCT
Georgia Southern	16	–	2	.889	23	–	8	.742
Troy	15	–	3	.833	25	–	8	.758
Arkansas State	14	–	4	.778	27	–	10	.730
James Madison †	14	–	4	.778	26	–	9	.743
Marshall	13	–	5	.722	28	–	9	.757
Old Dominion	9	–	9	.500	18	–	14	.563
Southern Miss	8	–	10	.444	15	–	16	.484
Texas State	7	–	11	.389	11	–	19	.367
Coastal Carolina	7	–	11	.389	14	–	18	.438
Louisiana–Monroe	7	–	11	.389	17	–	16	.515
Georgia State	5	–	13	.278	10	–	21	.323
South Alabama	5	–	13	.278	17	–	19	.472
Appalachian State	4	–	14	.222	11	–	19	.367
Louisiana	2	–	16	.111	5	–	26	.161
† 2026 Sun Belt tournament winner

The 2025–26 Texas State Bobcats women's basketball team represented Texas State University during the 2025–26 NCAA Division I women's basketball season. The Bobcats, led by 15th-year head coach Zenarae Antoine, played their home games at Strahan Arena in San Marcos, Texas as members of the Sun Belt Conference.

This was the Bobcats' final season as members of the Sun Belt Conference, as they moved to the newly reformed Pac-12 Conference, starting in the 2026–27 season.

== Previous season ==
The Bobcats finished the 2024–25 season 13–17, 7–11 in Sun Belt play, to finish in a tie for ninth place. They were defeated by Marshall in the second round of the Sun Belt tournament.

== Preseason ==
On October 20, 2025, the Sun Belt Conference released their preseason poll. Texas State was picked to finish 12th in the conference.

=== Preseason rankings ===
Sun Belt Preseason Poll
Place	Team	Votes
1	James Madison	189 (9)
2	Arkansas State	174 (3)
3	Troy	171 (1)
4	Old Dominion	151 (1)
5	Southern Miss	125
6	Coastal Carolina	104
7	Georgia State	102
8	Marshall	100
9	Appalachian State	94
10	Georgia Southern	73
11	Louisiana	67
12	Texas State	55
13	Louisiana–Monroe	36
14	South Alabama	29
(#) first-place votes

=== Preseason All-Sun Belt Teams ===
No players were named to the Preseason All-Sun Belt First, Second, or Third Teams.

== Roster ==
2025–26 Texas State Bobcats women's basketball team
Players
Coaches

Pos.	#	Name	Height	Year	Previous school	Hometown
G	1	Takeira Ramey	5 ft 7 in (1.7 m)	So	Massaponax High School	Stafford, Virginia
G	2	KP Parr	5 ft 4 in (1.63 m)	So	Wichita State	Waco, Texas
G	3	Saniya Burks	5 ft 8 in (1.73 m)	So	Rice High School	Mexia, Texas
G/F	4	Myla Harbor	5 ft 11 in (1.8 m)	Jr	Hinds Community College	Ferriday, Louisiana
G	5	Myri Walker	5 ft 4 in (1.63 m)	Sr	South Alabama	Burleson, Texas
F	10	Angela Carroll	6 ft 1 in (1.85 m)	Fr	La Vega High School	Waco, Texas
G	11	Mia Galbraith	5 ft 9 in (1.75 m)	RS So	Oklahoma State	Sunshine Coast, Australia
F	12	Kyla McBride	6 ft 0 in (1.83 m)	Jr	Northwest Florida State College	Magnolia, Arkansas
G	13	Taleiyah Gibbs	6 ft 0 in (1.83 m)	Jr	Howard	Charleston, South Carolina
F	20	Kyaija Stewart	6 ft 0 in (1.83 m)	Jr	Daytona State College	Ithaca, New York
F	21	Kaliyah Murphy	6 ft 0 in (1.83 m)	Fr	Elizabeth Seton High School	Chandler, Arizona
G	22	Deja Jones	5 ft 9 in (1.75 m)	GS	Indiana State	San Antonio, Texas
F	33	Kyra Anderson	6 ft 1 in (1.85 m)	So	Tyler Junior College	Huntington, Texas

Head coach

- Zenarae Antoine (Colorado State)

Assistant coach(es)

- Jericka Jenkins (Hampton)
- Paige Love (UNC Asheville)
- Barbara Farris (Tulane)
- Octavia Barnes (Houston)

Legend

- (C) Team captain
- (S) Suspended
- (I) Ineligible
- (W) Walk-on
- Injured
- Current redshirt

Roster
Last update: July 21, 2026

== Schedule and results ==
Date time, TV	Rank^{#}	Opponent^{#}	Result	Record	High points	High rebounds	High assists	Site (attendance) city, state
Regular season
November 3, 2025*; 7:00 pm, ESPN+		Ohio; MAC-SBC Challenge	L 66–72	0–1	34 – Burks	8 – Anderson	4 – Tied	Strahan Arena (781); San Marcos, TX
November 9, 2025*; 2:00 pm, ESPN+		at Texas Tech	L 50–83	0–2	15 – Galbraith	11 – Anderson	2 – Ramey	United Supermarkets Arena (3,118); Lubbock, TX
November 13, 2025*; 6:30 pm, ESPN+		at UTSA; I-35 Rivalry	L 41–64	0–3	11 – Jones	8 – Anderson	2 – Tied	Convocation Center (1,221); San Antonio, TX
November 17, 2025*; 7:00 pm, ESPN+		UT Rio Grande Valley	L 65–77	0–4	24 – Burks	6 – Tied	2 – Tied	Strahan Arena (750); San Marcos, TX
November 20, 2025*; 11:00 am, ESPN+		at Texas A&M–Corpus Christi	W 53–43	1–4	21 – Burks	7 – Anderson	3 – Anderson	Dugan Wellness Center (1,400); Corpus Christi, TX
November 25, 2025*; 7:00 pm, ESPN+		Tarleton State	L 45−56	1−5	16 – Burks	9 – Jones	1 – Tied	Strahan Arena (841); San Marcos, TX
November 30, 2025*; 2:00 pm, ESPN+		Prairie View A&M	W 93−52	2−5	28 – Burks	10 – Carroll	4 – Tied	Strahan Arena (652); San Marcos, TX
December 6, 2025*; 8:00 pm, ESPN+		at Stephen F. Austin	L 66–74	2–6	21 – Anderson	10 – Anderson	3 – Tied	William R. Johnson Coliseum (894); Nacogdoches, TX
December 10, 2025*; 5:00 pm, ESPN+		UNT Dallas	W 64–38	3–6	12 – Murphy	9 – Anderson	6 – Parr	Strahan Arena; San Marcos, TX
December 17, 2025; 5:00 pm, ESPN+		Louisiana	W 62–55	4–6 (1–0)	16 – Burks	11 – Anderson	5 – Jones	Strahan Arena (1,203); San Marcos, TX
December 20, 2025; 12:00 pm, ESPN+		Louisiana–Monroe	W 79–69	5–6 (2–0)	24 – Anderson	10 – Anderson	4 – Burks	Strahan Arena; San Marcos, TX
December 29, 2025*; 7:00 pm, ESPN+		Huston–Tillotson	W 95–33	6–6	21 – Walker	13 – Murphy	5 – Parr	Strahan Arena (616); San Marcos, TX
January 3, 2026; 1:00 pm, ESPN+		at James Madison	L 52−87	6−7 (2–1)	12 – Walker	6 – Anderson	2 – Ramey	Atlantic Union Bank Center (2,085); Harrisonburg, VA
January 7, 2026; 6:00 pm, ESPN+		at Troy	L 49–84	6–8 (2–2)	13 – McBride	6 – McBride	4 – Ramey	Trojan Arena (1,250); Troy, AL
January 10, 2026; 3:00 pm, ESPN+		at Louisiana	W 55–43	7–8 (3–2)	20 – Anderson	11 – Anderson	8 – Parr	Cajundome (503); Lafayette, LA
January 14, 2026; 11:00 am, ESPN+		Southern Miss	L 62–76	7–9 (3–3)	16 – Anderson	6 – Gibbs	2 – Tied	Strahan Arena (2,858); San Marcos, TX
January 17, 2026; 1:00 pm, ESPN+		Troy	L 63–67	7–10 (3–4)	27 – Burks	10 – Anderson	8 – Parr	Strahan Arena (1,563); San Marcos, TX
January 21, 2026; 7:00 pm, ESPN+		Appalachian State	W 63–49	8–10 (4–4)	19 – Anderson	12 – Anderson	2 – Tied	Strahan Arena (867); San Marcos, TX
January 24, 2026; 2:00 pm, ESPN+		Old Dominion	W 65–61	9–10 (5–4)	18 – Anderson	11 – Anderson	4 – Galbraith	Strahan Arena; San Marcos, TX
January 28, 2026; 5:00 pm, ESPN+		at Coastal Carolina	L 53–85	9–11 (5–5)	16 – Anderson	9 – Murphy	2 – Tied	HTC Center (786); Conway, SC
January 31, 2026; 1:00 pm, ESPN+		at Georgia State	W 68–59	10–11 (6–5)	21 – Anderson	15 – Anderson	4 – Parr	GSU Convocation Center (560); Atlanta, GA
February 4, 2026; 7:00 pm, ESPN+		Georgia Southern	L 57–61	10–12 (6–6)	17 – Burks	10 – Jones	4 – Jones	Strahan Arena (964); San Marcos, TX
February 7, 2026*; 1:00 pm, ESPN+		at Northern Illinois; MAC/SBC Challenge	L 69–71	10–13	23 – Anderson	6 – Jones	7 – Parr	NIU Convocation Center (485); DeKalb, IL
February 12, 2026; 7:00 pm, ESPN+		at South Alabama	W 69–63	11–13 (7–6)	21 – Burks	10 – Jones	5 – Parr	Mitchell Center (367); Mobile, AL
February 14, 2026; 5:00 pm, ESPN+		at Southern Miss	L 77–86	11–14 (7–7)	22 – Burks	8 – Tied	3 – Jones	Reed Green Coliseum (2,821); Hattiesburg, MS
February 18, 2026; 7:00 pm, ESPN+		Arkansas State	L 61–75	11–15 (7–8)	17 – Burks	10 – Anderson	5 – Parr	Strahan Arena (1,190); San Marcos, TX
February 21, 2026; 2:00 pm, ESPN+		South Alabama	L 59–64	11–16 (7–9)	15 – Jones	8 – Anderson	4 – Parr	Strahan Arena (1,069); San Marcos, TX
February 25, 2026; 6:30 pm, ESPN+		at Louisiana–Monroe	L 74–83	11–17 (7–10)	23 – Burks	6 – Carroll	7 – Jones	Fant–Ewing Coliseum (1,037); Monroe, LA
February 27, 2026; 5:00 pm, ESPN+		at Arkansas State	L 53–87	11–18 (7–11)	13 – Walker	10 – Anderson	1 – Tied	First National Bank Arena (5,074); Jonesboro, AR
Sun Belt tournament
March 5, 2026; 11:30 am, ESPN+	(8)	vs. (12) South Alabama; Third Round	L 59–69	11–19	15 – Parr	13 – Anderson	6 – Parr	Pensacola Bay Center (419); Pensacola, FL
*Non-conference game. ^{#}Rankings from AP Poll. (#) Tournament seedings in parentheses. All times are in Central.
