= 2025–26 Old Dominion Monarchs women's basketball team =

Intercollegiate basketball season

2025–26 Old Dominion Monarchs women's basketball
- Conference: Sun Belt Conference
- Record: 18–14 (9–9 Sun Belt)
- Head coach: DeLisha Milton-Jones (6th season)
- Assistant coaches: Danielle Bell; Josh Pace; Roland Jones Jr.
- Home arena: Chartway Arena

2025–26 Sun Belt Conference women's basketball standings
	Conf.				Overall
Team	W		L	PCT	W		L	PCT
Georgia Southern	16	–	2	.889	23	–	8	.742
Troy	15	–	3	.833	25	–	8	.758
Arkansas State	14	–	4	.778	27	–	10	.730
James Madison †	14	–	4	.778	26	–	9	.743
Marshall	13	–	5	.722	28	–	9	.757
Old Dominion	9	–	9	.500	18	–	14	.563
Southern Miss	8	–	10	.444	15	–	16	.484
Texas State	7	–	11	.389	11	–	19	.367
Coastal Carolina	7	–	11	.389	14	–	18	.438
Louisiana–Monroe	7	–	11	.389	17	–	16	.515
Georgia State	5	–	13	.278	10	–	21	.323
South Alabama	5	–	13	.278	17	–	19	.472
Appalachian State	4	–	14	.222	11	–	19	.367
Louisiana	2	–	16	.111	5	–	26	.161
† 2026 Sun Belt tournament winner

The 2025–26 Old Dominion Monarchs women's basketball team represented Old Dominion University during the 2025–26 NCAA Division I women's basketball season. The Monarchs, led by sixth-year head coach DeLisha Milton-Jones, played their home games at Chartway Arena in Norfolk, Virginia as members of the Sun Belt Conference.

== Previous season ==
In their 2024–25 season, the Monarchs finished fifth ranked in conference play and lost to Georgia State in the conference tournament fourth round. Following the conference tournament, they defeated Navy before losing to Purdue Fort Wayne in the second round of the 2025 Women's National Invitation Tournament.

== Preseason ==
On October 20, 2025, the Sun Belt Conference released their preseason coaches poll. Old Dominion was picked to finish fourth in the Sun Belt regular season.

=== Preseason rankings ===
Sun Belt preseason poll
Predicted finish	Team	Votes (1st place)
1	James Madison	189 (9)
2	Arkansas State	174 (3)
3	Troy	171 (1)
4	Old Dominion	151 (1)
5	Southern Miss	125
6	Coastal Carolina	104
7	Georgia State	102
8	Marshall	100
9	Appalachian State	94
10	Georgia Southern	73
11	Louisiana	67
12	Texas State	55
13	Louisiana–Monroe	36
14	South Alabama	29

=== Preseason All-Sun Belt Teams ===
Preseason All-Sun Belt teams
Team	Player	Position	Year
First	En'Dya Buford	Guard	6th
Third	Simone Cunningham	Guard	4th

== Roster ==
2025–26 Old Dominion Monarchs women's basketball team
Players
Coaches

Pos.	#	Name	Height	Year	Previous school	Hometown
F	0	Jaylen Ponder	5 ft 11 in (1.8 m)	Sr	Coastal Carolina	Pompano, Florida
G	1	Nevaeh Scott	5 ft 6 in (1.68 m)	Jr	NW Florida State College	Memphis, Tennessee
G	2	Simaru Fields	5 ft 6 in (1.68 m)	Sr	Gulf Coast CC	Gulfport, Mississippi
G/F	3	Simone Cunningham	5 ft 10 in (1.78 m)	Sr	Shelton State CC	Pleasant Grove, Alabama
G	5	Nisaa Muhammad	5 ft 10 in (1.78 m)	So	DeSoto HS	Dallas, Texas
G	7	Kelsey Thompson	5 ft 10 in (1.78 m)	Sr	South Alabama	Mobile, Alabama
F	8	Laila Walker	6 ft 4 in (1.93 m)	Sr	Louisiana–Monroe	Gulfport, Mississippi
G	9	Dalanna Carter	5 ft 8 in (1.73 m)	Jr	Coastal Carolina	Beach City, Texas
F	11	Nakiyah Allen	5 ft 10 in (1.78 m)	Jr	Kilgore College	Boyce, Louisiana
G	12	Alisha Nunley	5 ft 5 in (1.65 m)	Jr	Collin County CC	Euless, Texas
F	23	Mariah Clayton	5 ft 10 in (1.78 m)	So	Duncanville HS	Mesquite, Texas
G	25	En'Dya Buford	5 ft 7 in (1.7 m)	GS	Memphis	Memphis, Tennessee
G	30	Hama'ya Fielder	5 ft 8 in (1.73 m)	Sr	Pearl River CC	Philadelphia, Mississippi
F	34	T'anna Sadler	6 ft 1 in (1.85 m)	Fr	Lincoln HS	Dallas, Texas
F	54	Riley Stack	6 ft 4 in (1.93 m)	Jr	Coastal Carolina	Piedmont, South Carolina

Head coach

- DeLisha Milton-Jones (Florida)

Assistant coach(es)

- Danielle Bell (Georgia)
- Josh Pace (Syracuse)
- Roland Jones Jr. (Central Methodist)

Legend

- (C) Team captain
- (S) Suspended
- (I) Ineligible
- (W) Walk-on
- Injured
- Current redshirt

Roster
Last update: January 12, 2026

== Schedule and results ==
Date time, TV	Rank^{#}	Opponent^{#}	Result	Record	High points	High rebounds	High assists	Site (attendance) city, state
Regular season
November 3, 2025*; 6:30 p.m., ESPN+		UMass; MAC–SBC Challenge	L 52–58	0–1	15 – Buford	11 – Cunningham	3 – Buford	Chartway Arena (1,706); Norfolk, VA
November 7, 2025*; 6:30 p.m., ESPN+		Elizabeth City State	W 106–32	1–1	14 – Fields	10 – Walker	3 – tied	Chartway Arena (1,813); Norfolk, VA
November 12, 2025*; 6:30 p.m., ESPN+		Delaware	W 73–66	2–1	23 – Cunningham	11 – Cunningham	5 – Fields	Chartway Arena (565); Norfolk, VA
November 16, 2025*; 1:00 p.m., FloSports		at William & Mary; Rivalry	W 56–53	3–1	18 – Fields	8 – tied	3 – Scott	Kaplan Arena (1,081); Williamsburg, VA
November 21, 2025*; 11:00 a.m., ESPN+		at East Carolina	W 73–67	4–1	23 – Cunningham	9 – Cunningham	6 – Buford	Williams Arena (5,432); Greenville, NC
November 23, 2025*; 2:00 p.m., ESPN+		North Carolina Central	W 85–48	5–1	12 – Buford	6 – tied	4 – Buford	Chartway Arena (1,676); Norfolk, VA
November 25, 2025*; 5:30 p.m., FloSports		vs. Texas Tech; Hoopfest Women's Challenge	L 42–67	5–2	8 – Buford	8 – Walker	3 – Buford	Comerica Center (486); Frisco, TX
November 27, 2025*; 12:00 p.m., FloSports		vs. Oregon; Hoopfest Women's Challenge	L 46–84	5–3	10 – Thompson	9 – Cunningham	3 – tied	Comerica Center (125); Frisco, TX
December 1, 2025*; 6:30 p.m., ESPN+		Delaware State	W 68–45	6–3	11 – Allen	8 – Stack	3 – tied	Chartway Arena (1,578); Norfolk, VA
December 7, 2025*; 2:00 p.m., ESPN+		Howard	W 63–59	7–3	21 – Fields	8 – Thompson	3 – Fields	Chartway Arena (2,074); Norfolk, VA
December 17, 2025; 11:00 a.m., ESPN+		Troy	L 59–81	7–4 (0–1)	10 – Fields	9 – Stack	2 – Fields	Chartway Arena (5,263); Norfolk, VA
December 21, 2025*; 7:30 p.m., Plex		vs. No. 14 Ole Miss; Cherokee Invitational semifinal	L 57–86	7–5	20 – Buford	4 – tied	2 – tied	Harrah's Cherokee (1,267); Cherokee, NC
December 22, 2025; 5:00 p.m., Plex		vs. Indiana State; Cherokee Invitational consolation	W 89–68	8–5	19 – Buford	8 – Stack	4 – Buford	Harrah's Cherokee (47); Cherokee, NC
January 1, 2026; 2:00 p.m., ESPN+		Georgia Southern	W 87–84 ^{2OT}	9–5 (1–1)	22 – Buford	10 – Buford	5 – Fields	Chartway Arena (1,869); Norfolk, VA
January 3, 2026; 1:00 p.m., ESPN+		Georgia State	W 73–68	10–5 (2–1)	29 – Fields	7 – tied	6 – Fields	Chartway Arena (1,474); Norfolk, VA
January 7, 2026; 6:00 p.m., ESPN+		at Marshall	L 70–77	10–6 (2–2)	19 – Fields	12 – Thompson	5 – Fields	Cam Henderson Center (1,003); Huntington, WV
January 10, 2026; 1:00 p.m., ESPN+		at Georgia Southern	L 60–77	10–7 (2–3)	15 – tied	7 – Cunningham	4 – Fields	Hill Convocation Center (1,032); Statesboro, GA
January 14, 2026; 6:30 p.m., ESPN+		Appalachian State	W 65–54	11–7 (3–3)	18 – Buford	6 – tied	3 – Clayton	Chartway Arena (1,569); Norfolk, VA
January 17, 2026; 2:00 p.m., ESPN+		Marshall; Anne Donovan Classic	W 84–82 ^{OT}	12–7 (4–3)	21 – Buford	7 – Cunningham	6 – Buford	Chartway Arena (2,495); Norfolk, VA
January 21, 2026; 1:00 p.m., ESPN+		at Arkansas State	L 55−84	12−8 (4−4)	21 – Buford	7 – tied	1 – tied	First National Bank Arena (3,567); Jonesboro, AR
January 24, 2026; 3:00 p.m., ESPN+		at Texas State	L 61−65	12−9 (4−5)	16 – Stack	6 – tied	4 – Buford	Strahan Arena; San Marcos, TX
January 28, 2026; 6:30 p.m., ESPN+		Louisiana–Monroe	W 85−62	13−9 (5−5)	22 – Stack	9 – Stack	7 – Buford	Chartway Arena (2,503); Norfolk, VA
January 31, 2026; 1:00 p.m., ESPN+		Southern Miss	L 83−86 ^{OT}	13−10 (5−6)	24 – Fields	7 – Thompson	5 – Ponder	Chartway Arena (2,167); Norfolk, VA
February 4, 2026; 7:00 p.m., ESPN+		at Louisiana	W 72−61	14−10 (6−6)	12 – Fields	8 – Stack	4 – tied	Cajundome (616); Lafayette, LA
February 7, 2026*; 1:00 p.m., ESPN+		at Ohio; MAC–SBC Challenge	W 84−76	15−10	26 – Buford	8 – Buford	3 – Carter	Convocation Center (738); Athens, OH
February 11, 2026; 5:00 p.m., ESPN+		Coastal Carolina	L 62−69	15−11 (6−7)	14 – Fields	6 – tied	4 – Carter	Chartway Arena (2,127); Norfolk, VA
February 14, 2026; 1:00 p.m., ESPN+		James Madison; Royal Rivalry	L 53−87	15−12 (6−8)	12 – Thompson	6 – tied	3 – Buford	Chartway Arena (3,869); Norfolk, VA
February 19, 2026; 5:30 p.m., ESPN+		at Georgia State	W 88−75	16−12 (7−8)	16 – Cunningham	8 – Clayton	5 – Scott	GSU Convocation Center (1,459); Atlanta, GA
February 21, 2026; 3:30 p.m., ESPN+		at Coastal Carolina	W 73−60	17−12 (8−8)	28 – Clayton	15 – Ponder	6 – Fields	HTC Center (751); Conway, SC
February 25, 2026; 5:00 p.m., ESPN+		at James Madison; Royal Rivalry	L 55−77	17−13 (8−9)	14 – Fields	8 – Stack	2 – tied	Atlantic Union Bank Center (2,068); Harrisonburg, VA
February 27, 2026; 6:30 p.m., ESPN+		at Appalachian State	W 75−65	18−13 (9−9)	19 – Buford	8 – Cunningham	3 – Scott	Holmes Center (408); Boone, NC
Sun Belt tournament
March 6, 2026; 3:00 p.m., ESPN+	(6)	vs. (10) Louisiana–Monroe; Fourth round	L 67−68	18−14	14 – tied	6 – Buford	5 – tied	Pensacola Bay Center (640); Pensacola, FL
*Non-conference game. ^{#}Rankings from AP poll. (#) Tournament seedings in parentheses. All times are in Eastern.

- Source: Old Dominion Athletics

== See also ==
- 2025–26 Old Dominion Monarchs men's basketball team
