= 2025–26 Coastal Carolina Chanticleers women's basketball team =

American college basketball season

2025–26 Coastal Carolina Chanticleers women's basketball
- Conference: Sun Belt Conference
- Record: 14–18 (7–11 Sun Belt)
- Head coach: Kevin Pederson (4th season)
- Associate head coach: DeCole Shoemate Robertson
- Assistant coaches: Darius Carter; Tatum Burstrom; Dennis Cox
- Home arena: HTC Center

2025–26 Sun Belt Conference women's basketball standings
	Conf.				Overall
Team	W		L	PCT	W		L	PCT
Georgia Southern	16	–	2	.889	23	–	8	.742
Troy	15	–	3	.833	25	–	8	.758
Arkansas State	14	–	4	.778	27	–	10	.730
James Madison †	14	–	4	.778	26	–	9	.743
Marshall	13	–	5	.722	28	–	9	.757
Old Dominion	9	–	9	.500	18	–	14	.563
Southern Miss	8	–	10	.444	15	–	16	.484
Texas State	7	–	11	.389	11	–	19	.367
Coastal Carolina	7	–	11	.389	14	–	18	.438
Louisiana–Monroe	7	–	11	.389	17	–	16	.515
Georgia State	5	–	13	.278	10	–	21	.323
South Alabama	5	–	13	.278	17	–	19	.472
Appalachian State	4	–	14	.222	11	–	19	.367
Louisiana	2	–	16	.111	5	–	26	.161
† 2026 Sun Belt tournament winner

The 2025–26 Coastal Carolina Chanticleers women's basketball team represented Coastal Carolina University during the 2025–26 NCAA Division I women's basketball season. The Chanticleers, led by fourth-year head coach Kevin Pederson, played their home games at the HTC Center in Conway, South Carolina as members of the Sun Belt Conference.

== Previous season ==
The Chanticleers finished the 2024–25 season 23–9, 12–6 in Sun Belt play, to finish in fourth place. They defeated Georgia State, before falling to top-seeded James Madison in the semifinals of the Sun Belt tournament. They received an at-large bid to the WNIT, where they would be defeated by Campbell in the first round.

== Preseason ==
On October 20, 2025, the Sun Belt Conference released their preseason poll. Coastal Carolina was picked to finish sixth in the conference.

=== Preseason rankings ===
Sun Belt Preseason Poll
Place	Team	Votes
1	James Madison	189 (9)
2	Arkansas State	174 (3)
3	Troy	171 (1)
4	Old Dominion	151 (1)
5	Southern Miss	125
6	Coastal Carolina	104
7	Georgia State	102
8	Marshall	100
9	Appalachian State	94
10	Georgia Southern	73
11	Louisiana	67
12	Texas State	55
13	Louisiana–Monroe	36
14	South Alabama	29
(#) first-place votes

=== Preseason All-Sun Belt Teams ===
Preseason All-Sun Belt Teams
Team	Player	Year	Position
Second	Kristin Williams	Graduate Student	Guard

== Roster ==
2025–26 Coastal Carolina Chanticleers women's basketball team
Players
Coaches

Pos.	#	Name	Height	Year	Previous school	Hometown
G	0	Hennessey Luu-Brown	5 ft 7 in (1.7 m)	GS	Miami (OH)	Toronto, Ontario
G	1	Baylee Lowder	5 ft 10 in (1.78 m)	Fr	Grantsville High School	Tooele, Utah
F	2	Tessa Grady	6 ft 2 in (1.88 m)	Jr	Wisconsin	Dublin, Ohio
G	3	J'yana Salton	5 ft 8 in (1.73 m)	Jr	Trinity Valley Community College	Charlotte, North Carolina
G	5	Kristin Williams	5 ft 8 in (1.73 m)	GS	UMass	San Diego, California
G	7	Paige Bradley (5th)	5 ft 10 in (1.78 m)	Sr	Tulsa	Dallas, Texas
G	11	Dawson Jemerson	5 ft 5 in (1.65 m)	So	Red Oak High School	DeSoto, Texas
G	12	Olivia Klanac	5 ft 9 in (1.75 m)	Fr	Medina High School	Medina, Ohio
F	13	Tracey Hueston (5th)	6 ft 2 in (1.88 m)	Sr	Charlotte	Roanoke, Virginia
F	15	Tateyoina Harris	5 ft 10 in (1.78 m)	Jr	Mars Hill	Camden, South Carolina
F	17	Kinsea Grimes	6 ft 0 in (1.83 m)	Fr	Lake Ridge High School	Mansfield, Texas
G	23	D'Yanis Jimenez	5 ft 8 in (1.73 m)	Jr	Wisconsin	Cape Coral, Florida

Head coach

- Kevin Pederson (Clemson)

Assistant coach(es)

- DeCole Shoemate Robertson (Liberty)
- Darius Carter (Tusculum)
- Tatum Burstrom (Carson–Newman)
- Dennis Cox (Central Florida)

Legend

- (C) Team captain
- (S) Suspended
- (I) Ineligible
- (W) Walk-on
- (5th) Fifth-year senior
- Injured
- Current redshirt

Roster
Last update: July 23, 2026

== Schedule and results ==
Date time, TV	Rank^{#}	Opponent^{#}	Result	Record	High points	High rebounds	High assists	Site (attendance) city, state
Regular season
November 3, 2025*; 6:00 pm, ESPN+		Miami (OH); MAC-SBC Challenge	L 53–63	0–1	13 – Grady	13 – Harris	3 – Williams	HTC Center (880); Conway, SC
November 5, 2025*; 9:00 pm, ESPN+		at BYU	L 57–91	0–2	17 – Williams	9 – Hueston	3 – Williams	Marriott Center (2,552); Provo, UT
November 9, 2025*; 1:00 pm, ESPN+		Lees–McRae	W 111–53	1–2	23 – Grady	12 – Harris	6 – Jimenez	HTC Center (625); Conway, SC
November 12, 2025*; 7:00 pm, FloCollege		at UNC Wilmington	W 80–56	2–2	23 – Grady	9 – Tied	6 – Bradley	Trask Coliseum (852); Wilmington, NC
November 15, 2025*; 2:00 pm, ACCNX		at Virginia Tech	L 59–82	2–3	21 – Hueston	5 – Tied	6 – Jimenez	Cassell Coliseum (4,408); Blacksburg, VA
November 19, 2025*; 6:00 pm, ACCN		at No. 16 NC State	L 58−71	2−4	22 – Grady	11 – Hueston	3 – Tied	Reynolds Coliseum (4,513); Raleigh, NC
November 24, 2025*; 6:00 pm, ESPN+		Presbyterian	W 87−38	3−4	23 – Williams	7 – Hueston	4 – Grimes	HTC Center (581); Conway, SC
November 28, 2025*; 2:00 pm, ESPN+		Jackson State; Coastal Carolina Tournament	W 103–61	4–4	21 – Grimes	11 – Lowder	5 – Jimenez	HTC Center (625); Conway, SC
November 30, 2025*; 1:00 pm, ESPN+		Gardner–Webb; Coastal Carolina Tournament	W 108–57	5–4	25 – Grimes	12 – Hueston	9 – Jimenez	HTC Center (604); Conway, SC
December 6, 2025*; 2:00 pm, ESPN+		at Jacksonville	L 51–68	5–5	14 – Grady	9 – Williams	4 – Williams	Swisher Gymnasium (132); Jacksonville, FL
December 10, 2025*; 6:00 pm, ESPN+		UNC Greensboro	W 67–61	6–5	19 – Grimes	10 – Grimes	5 – Williams	HTC Center (589); Conway, SC
December 17, 2025; 6:00 pm, ESPN+		James Madison	L 68–71	6–6 (0–1)	19 – Grady	6 – Harris	3 – Grady	HTC Center (508); Conway, SC
December 20, 2025; 1:00 pm, ESPN+		Georgia State	L 63−68	6−7 (0–2)	21 – Williams	10 – Bradley	3 – Williams	HTC Center (707); Conway, SC
December 29, 2025*; 6:00 pm, ESPN+		Columbia (SC)	W 103–41	7–7	23 – Williams	11 – Harris	3 – Tied	HTC Center (683); Conway, SC
January 1, 2026; 3:30 pm, ESPN+		Marshall	L 85–87 ^{OT}	7–8 (0–3)	20 – Williams	13 – Bradley	4 – Bradley	HTC Center (602); Conway, SC
January 3, 2026; 3:30 pm, ESPN+		Georgia Southern	L 50–60	7–9 (0–4)	15 – Williams	7 – Grimes	2 – Tied	HTC Center (593); Conway, SC
January 7, 2026; 6:30 pm, ESPN+		at Appalachian State	W 69–53	8–9 (1–4)	17 – Williams	8 – Hueston	5 – Jimenez	Holmes Center (302); Boone, NC
January 10, 2026; 1:00 pm, ESPN+		at Marshall	L 74–80	8–10 (1–5)	20 – Grady	10 – Hueston	4 – Jimenez	Cam Henderson Center (1,591); Huntington, WV
January 17, 2026; 1:00 pm, ESPN+		South Alabama	W 63–59	9–10 (2–5)	15 – Grady	10 – Hueston	3 – Jimenez	HTC Center (1,007); Conway, SC
January 21, 2026; 7:00 pm, ESPN+		at Louisiana	L 66–69	9–11 (2–6)	16 – Bradley	14 – Hueston	4 – Bradley	Cajundome (484); Lafayette, LA
January 24, 2026; 1:00 pm, ESPN+		at Southern Miss	W 81–55	10–11 (3–6)	24 – Hueston	8 – Grimes	5 – Williams	Reed Green Coliseum (1,441); Hattiesburg, MS
January 28, 2026; 6:00 pm, ESPN+		Texas State	W 85–53	11–11 (4–6)	21 – Grady	9 – Hueston	4 – Tied	HTC Center (786); Conway, SC
January 30, 2026; 2:30 pm, ESPN+		Troy	L 77–88	11–12 (4–7)	25 – Grady	7 – Lowder	6 – Williams	HTC Center (809); Conway, SC
February 4, 2026; 8:00 pm, ESPN+		at Arkansas State	L 70–78	11–13 (4–8)	24 – Grady	9 – Grimes	5 – Grimes	First National Bank Arena (1,423); Jonesboro, AR
February 7, 2026*; 2:00 pm, ESPN+		at Bowling Green; MAC-SBC Challenge	L 82–93	11–14	21 – Grady	5 – Tied	4 – Williams	Stroh Center (1,807); Bowling Green, OH
February 11, 2026; 5:00 pm, ESPN+		at Old Dominion	W 69–62	12–14 (5–8)	22 – Grady	16 – Harris	6 – Williams	Chartway Arena (2,127); Norfolk, VA
February 14, 2026; 1:00 pm, ESPN+		at Georgia Southern	L 56–67	12–15 (5–9)	14 – Grady	7 – Hueston	2 – Tied	Hill Convocation Center (1,023); Statesboro, GA
February 18, 2026; 11:00 am, ESPN+		Appalachian State	W 65–64	13–15 (6–9)	20 – Klanac	10 – Hueston	3 – Williams	HTC Center (1,221); Conway, SC
February 21, 2026; 3:30 pm, ESPN+		Old Dominion	L 60–73	13–16 (6–10)	16 – Hueston	9 – Hueston	3 – Tied	HTC Center (751); Conway, SC
February 24, 2026; 5:00 pm, ESPN+		at Georgia State	W 92–84 ^{OT}	14–16 (7–10)	22 – Williams	9 – Hueston	6 – Grady	GSU Convocation Center (583); Atlanta, GA
February 27, 2026; 5:00 pm, ESPN+		at James Madison	L 56–72	14–17 (7–11)	30 – Hueston	10 – Williams	2 – Tied	Atlantic Union Bank Center (2,349); Harrisonburg, VA
Sun Belt tournament
March 4, 2026; 12:30 pm, ESPN+	(9)	vs. (12) South Alabama; Second Round	L 70–80	14–18	16 – Williams	12 – Grimes	5 – Williams	Pensacola Bay Center (365); Pensacola, FL
*Non-conference game. ^{#}Rankings from AP Poll. (#) Tournament seedings in parentheses. All times are in Eastern.
