= 2025–26 Troy Trojans women's basketball team =

Intercollegiate basketball season

2025–26 Troy Trojans women's basketball

Resorts World Las Vegas Classic champions

WBIT, First Round
- Conference: Sun Belt Conference
- Record: 25–8 (15–3 Sun Belt)
- Head coach: Chanda Rigby (14th season)
- Assistant coaches: Jennifer Graf; Stephanie Murphy; Grace Daniels
- Home arena: Trojan Arena

2025–26 Sun Belt Conference women's basketball standings
	Conf.				Overall
Team	W		L	PCT	W		L	PCT
Georgia Southern	16	–	2	.889	23	–	8	.742
Troy	15	–	3	.833	25	–	8	.758
Arkansas State	14	–	4	.778	25	–	9	.735
James Madison †	14	–	4	.778	25	–	9	.735
Marshall	13	–	5	.722	24	–	9	.727
Old Dominion	9	–	9	.500	18	–	14	.563
Southern Miss	8	–	10	.444	15	–	16	.484
Texas State	7	–	11	.389	11	–	19	.367
Coastal Carolina	7	–	11	.389	14	–	18	.438
Louisiana–Monroe	7	–	11	.389	17	–	16	.515
Georgia State	5	–	13	.278	10	–	21	.323
South Alabama	5	–	13	.278	17	–	18	.486
Appalachian State	4	–	14	.222	11	–	19	.367
Louisiana	2	–	16	.111	5	–	26	.161
† 2026 Sun Belt tournament winner As of March 23, 2026

The 2025–26 Troy Trojans women's basketball team will represent Troy University during the 2025–26 NCAA Division I women's basketball season. The basketball team, led by fourteenth-year head coach Chanda Rigby, will play all home games at the Trojan Arena along with the Troy Trojans men's basketball team. They are members of the Sun Belt Conference.

== Offseason ==
=== Departures ===
Name	Number	Pos.	Height	Year	Hometown	Notes
Briana Peguero	1	G	5'7"	Senior	Houston, Texas	Transferred to Houston
Shaulana Wagner	13	G	5'10"	Senior	Detroit, Michigan	Transferred to St. John's
Brianna Jackson	22	F	6'3"	Senior	Virginia Beach, Virginia	Graduated; signed to play for the Verstärkt den sytainics MBC team in Germany
Adriana Jones	23	G	5'6"	Junior	Newbern, Alabama	Transferred to Jacksonville State
Khila Morris	24	G	5'11"	Junior	Bronx, New York	Transferred to Coppin State
Emma Imevbore	34	G	6'4"	Senior	London, England	Graduated
Jamirica Roberson	42	F	6'2"	Junior	Montgomery, Alabama	Transferred to Grambling State

=== Transfers ===
Name	Number	Pos.	Height	Year	Hometown	Old School
Detavia Salter	0	F	6'2"	Junior	Colquitt, Georgia	Georgia Southwestern State
Shakirah Edwards	6	G	5'10"	Sophomore	Panama City, Florida	Mississippi State
Kamesha Moore	8	G	5'7"	Senior	Pasadena, California	Florida Memorial
Rachel Leggett	22	G	5'8"	Senior	Navarre, Florida	South Alabama

=== Recruiting ===
College recruiting information
Name	Hometown	School	Height	Weight	Commit date
Saniya Jackson; Guard	Montgomery, AL	Park Crossing HS	5 ft 8 in (1.73 m)	N/A	
Saniya Jackson; Guard	Recruit ratings: No ratings found				
Lana Koricanac; Guard	Belgrade, Serbia	Greenforst Christian Academy	5 ft 11 in (1.80 m)	N/A	
Lana Koricanac; Guard	Recruit ratings: No ratings found				
Jasmine Timmons; Forward	Houston, TX	St. Pius X HS	6 ft 3 in (1.91 m)	N/A	
Jasmine Timmons; Forward	Recruit ratings: No ratings found				
Marianah Achol; Forward	Rumbek, South Sudan	Greenforst Christian Academy	6 ft 4 in (1.93 m)	N/A	
Marianah Achol; Forward	Recruit ratings: No ratings found				
Overall recruit ranking:
Note: In many cases, Scout, Rivals, 247Sports, On3, and ESPN may conflict in their listings of height and weight.; In these cases, the average was taken. ESPN grades are on a 100-point scale.; Sources: "Troy 2025-26 Basketball Commits". ESPN.; "2025-26 Team Ranking". Rivals.com.

== Preseason ==
On October 20, 2025, the Sun Belt Conference released their preseason coaches poll. Troy was picked to finish third in the Sun Belt regular season.

=== Preseason rankings ===
Sun Belt preseason poll
Predicted finish	Team	Votes (1st place)
1	James Madison	189 (9)
2	Arkansas State	174 (3)
3	Troy	171 (1)
4	Old Dominion	151 (1)
5	Southern Miss	125
6	Coastal Carolina	104
7	Georgia State	102
8	Marshall	100
9	Appalachian State	94
10	Georgia Southern	73
11	Louisiana	67
12	Texas State	55
13	Louisiana–Monroe	36
14	South Alabama	29

=== Preseason All-Sun Belt Teams ===
Preseason All-Sun Belt teams
Team	Player	Position	Year
First	Zay Dyer	Forward	4th
Second	Rachel Leggett	Guard	4th
Third	Ashley Baez	Guard	4th

== Roster ==
2025–26 Troy Trojans women's basketball team
Players
Coaches

Pos.	#	Name	Height	Year	Previous school	Hometown
F	0	Detavia Salter	6 ft 2 in (1.88 m)	Jr	Bainbridge HS; Georgia Southwestern State	Colquitt, Georgia
G	1	Saniya Jackson	5 ft 8 in (1.73 m)	Fr	Park Crossing HS	Montgomery, Alabama
G	2	Ashley Baez	5 ft 5 in (1.65 m)	Sr	Hyde School; Florida Gulf Coast	Santo Domingo, Dominican Republic
G	3	Emani Jenkins	5 ft 10 in (1.78 m)	Sr	South Oak Cliff HS; Trinity Valley CC	Dallas, Texas
F	5	Zay Dyer	6 ft 2 in (1.88 m)	Sr	Maynard Jackson HS; Georgia State	Atlanta, Georgia
G	6	Shakirah Edwards	5 ft 10 in (1.78 m)	So	Rutherford HS; Mississippi State	Panama City, Florida
G	8	Kamesha Moore	5 ft 7 in (1.7 m)	Sr	Pasadena HS; Florida Memorial	Pasadena, California
F	12	Fortuna Ngnawo	6 ft 0 in (1.83 m)	Sr	G.B.H.S. Bafoussam; Cochise CC	Bafoussam, Cameroon
G	14	Shaulana Wagner	5 ft 11 in (1.8 m)	Fr	Greenforst Christian Academy	Belgrade, Serbia
F	15	Jasmine Timmons	6 ft 3 in (1.91 m)	Fr	St. Pius X HS	Houston, Texas
G	22	Rachel Leggett	5 ft 8 in (1.73 m)	Sr	Navarre HS; South Alabama	Navarre, Florida
F	25	Marianah Achol	6 ft 4 in (1.93 m)	Fr	Greenforst Christian Academy	Rumbek, South Sudan
G	35	Leilani Guion	5 ft 10 in (1.78 m)	Sr	Boone HS; Eastern Florida State	Orlando, Florida

Head coach

- Chanda Rigby (Nova Southeastern)

Assistant coach(es)

- Jennifer Graf (Northwestern State)
- Stephanie Murphy (Mississippi)
- Grace Daniels (Texas–San Antonio)
- Hailey Kuhns (LSU)

Legend

- (C) Team captain
- (S) Suspended
- (I) Ineligible
- (W) Walk-on
- Injured
- Current redshirt

Roster

== Schedule and results ==
Date time, TV	Rank^{#}	Opponent^{#}	Result	Record	High points	High rebounds	High assists	Site city, state
Exhibition
October 28, 2025*; 6:00 p.m.		Auburn Montgomery	W 114–43		–	–	–	Trojan Arena; Troy, AL
Regular season
November 3, 2025*; 6:00 p.m., ESPN+		Toledo; MAC-SBC Challenge	W 88–51	1–0	18 – Jenkins	8 – Dyer	5 – Baez	Trojan Arena (1,184); Troy, AL
November 6, 2025*; 12:00 p.m., ESPN+		Mississippi Valley State	W 95–50	2–0	22 – Ngnawo	14 – Dyer	4 – Tied	Trojan Arena (789); Troy, AL
November 12, 2025*; 6:00 p.m., ESPN+		Chattanooga	W 73–56	3–0	18 – Baez	17 – Dyer	3 – Tied	Trojan Arena (2,465); Troy, AL
November 18, 2025*; 6:30 p.m., ESPN+		at Kansas State	L 59–81	3–1	15 – Jenkins	12 – Dyer	4 – Jackson	Bramlage Coliseum (3,079); Manhattan, KS
November 20, 2025*; 11:30 a.m., SECN+		at Missouri	W 100–82	4–1	22 – Tied	11 – Baez	4 – Tied	Mizzou Arena; Columbia, MO
November 24, 2025*; 6:00 p.m., ESPN+		Montana State	W 74–60	5–1	19 – Ngnawo	15 – Dyer	5 – Baez	Trojan Arena; Troy, AL
November 27, 2025*; 9:30 p.m., FloSports		vs. Texas Southern; Las Vegas Resorts World Classic	W 103–74	6–1	17 – Ngnawo	11 – Dyer	4 – Guion	Resorts World Arena; Las Vegas, NV
November 29, 2025*; 9:30 p.m., FloSports		vs. Florida Gulf Coast; Las Vegas Resorts World Classic						Resorts World Arena; Las Vegas, NV
December 3, 2025*; 10:00 a.m., ESPN+		at Longwood						Joan Perry Brock Center; Farmville, VA
December 10, 2025*; 12:00 p.m., ESPN+		Oakwood						Trojan Arena; Troy, AL
December 17, 2025; 10:00 a.m., ESPN+		at Old Dominion						Chartway Arena; Norfolk, VA
December 21, 2025*; 2:00 p.m.		at Alabama						Coleman Coliseum; Tuscaloosa, AL
January 1, 2026; 4:00 p.m., ESPN+		Louisiana						Cajundome; Lafayette, LA
January 3, 2026; 2:00 p.m., ESPN+		at Southern Miss						Reed Green Coliseum; Hattiesburg, MS
January 7, 2026; 6:00 p.m., ESPN+		Texas State						Trojan Arena; Troy, AL
January 10, 2026; 3:30 p.m., ESPN+		Arkansas State						Trojan Arena; Troy, AL
January 14, 2026; 6:30 p.m., ESPN+		at Louisiana–Monroe	W 86−80	14−3 (5−1)	24 – Dyer	13 – Dyer	5 – Baez	Fant–Ewing Coliseum (1,128); Monroe, LA
January 17, 2026; 1:00 p.m., ESPN+		at Texas State						Strahan Arena; San Marcos, TX
January 22, 2026; 6:00 p.m., ESPN+		Georgia Southern						Trojan Arena; Troy, AL
January 24, 2026; 3:30 p.m., ESPN+		Georgia State						Trojan Arena; Troy, AL
January 28, 2026; 5:00 p.m., ESPN+		at Marshall						Cam Henderson Center; Huntington, WV
January 31, 2026; 12:00 p.m., ESPN+		at Coastal Carolina						HTC Center; Conway, SC
February 4, 2026; 6:00 p.m., ESPN+		Appalachian State						Trojan Arena; Troy, AL
February 7, 2026*		at Ball State; MAC-SBC Challenge						Worthen Arena; Muncie, IN
February 12, 2026; 6:00 p.m., ESPN+		Louisiana						Trojan Arena; Troy, AL
February 14, 2026; 1:00 p.m., ESPN+		Louisiana–Monroe						Trojan Arena; Troy, AL
February 18, 2026; 6:00 p.m., ESPN+		South Alabama						Trojan Arena; Troy, AL
February 21, 2026; 1:00 p.m., ESPN+		Southern Miss						Trojan Arena; Troy, AL
February 24, 2026; 5:00 p.m., ESPN+		at Arkansas State						First National Bank Arena; Jonesboro, AR
February 27, 2026; 5:00 p.m., ESPN+		at South Alabama						Mitchell Center; Mobile, AL
Sun Belt tournament
March 3–9, 2026		vs.						Pensacola Bay Center; Pensacola, FL
*Non-conference game. ^{#}Rankings from AP Poll. (#) Tournament seedings in parentheses. All times are in Central Time.

== See also ==
- 2025–26 Troy Trojans men's basketball team
