= 2025–26 Appalachian State Mountaineers women's basketball team =

American college basketball season

2025–26 Appalachian State Mountaineers women's basketball
- Conference: Sun Belt Conference
- Record: 11–19 (4–14 Sun Belt)
- Head coach: Alaura Sharp (2nd season)
- Assistant coaches: Rabun Wright; Brooklyn Taylor; Joel Harrison; LaRomeo McKee
- Home arena: Holmes Center

2025–26 Sun Belt Conference women's basketball standings
	Conf.				Overall
Team	W		L	PCT	W		L	PCT
Georgia Southern	16	–	2	.889	23	–	8	.742
Troy	15	–	3	.833	25	–	8	.758
Arkansas State	14	–	4	.778	27	–	10	.730
James Madison †	14	–	4	.778	26	–	9	.743
Marshall	13	–	5	.722	28	–	9	.757
Old Dominion	9	–	9	.500	18	–	14	.563
Southern Miss	8	–	10	.444	15	–	16	.484
Texas State	7	–	11	.389	11	–	19	.367
Coastal Carolina	7	–	11	.389	14	–	18	.438
Louisiana–Monroe	7	–	11	.389	17	–	16	.515
Georgia State	5	–	13	.278	10	–	21	.323
South Alabama	5	–	13	.278	17	–	19	.472
Appalachian State	4	–	14	.222	11	–	19	.367
Louisiana	2	–	16	.111	5	–	26	.161
† 2026 Sun Belt tournament winner

The 2025–26 Appalachian State Mountaineers women's basketball team represented Appalachian State University during the 2025–26 NCAA Division I women's basketball season. The Mountaineers, led by second-year head coach Alaura Sharp, played their home games at the Holmes Center in Boone, North Carolina as members of the Sun Belt Conference.

== Previous season ==
The Mountaineers finished the 2024–25 season 13–17, 9–9 in Sun Belt play, to finish in a three-way tie for fifth place. They were defeated by Marshall in the fourth round of the Sun Belt tournament.

== Preseason ==
On October 20, 2025, the Sun Belt Conference released their preseason poll. Appalachian State was picked to finish ninth in the conference.

=== Preseason rankings ===
Sun Belt Preseason Poll
Place	Team	Votes
1	James Madison	189 (9)
2	Arkansas State	174 (3)
3	Troy	171 (1)
4	Old Dominion	151 (1)
5	Southern Miss	125
6	Coastal Carolina	104
7	Georgia State	102
8	Marshall	100
9	Appalachian State	94
10	Georgia Southern	73
11	Louisiana	67
12	Texas State	55
13	Louisiana–Monroe	36
14	South Alabama	29
(#) first-place votes

=== Preseason All-Sun Belt Teams ===
Preseason All-Sun Belt Teams
Team	Player	Year	Position
Third	Elena Pericic	Senior	Forward

== Roster ==
2025–26 Appalachian State Mountaineers women's basketball team
Players
Coaches

Pos.	#	Name	Height	Year	Previous school	Hometown
G	0	Emma Smith	5 ft 7 in (1.7 m)	Sr	Denver	Vestavia Hills, Alabama
G	2	Jayden McBride	5 ft 10 in (1.78 m)	So	Georgetown	Erie, Pennsylvania
G	3	Isa Roman	5 ft 8 in (1.73 m)	Fr	Grace Christian School	Cary, North Carolina
G	10	Jada Burton	5 ft 8 in (1.73 m)	GS	Western Carolina	Spartanburg, South Carolina
F	17	Feryal Defne Atli	6 ft 3 in (1.91 m)	So	West Virginia	Mersin, Türkiye
F	20	Elena Pericic	6 ft 1 in (1.85 m)	Sr	Salem	Rijeka, Croatia
G	23	Riley Stoker	6 ft 0 in (1.83 m)	Fr	Somerset Prep North Lauderdale	Davie, Florida
G	24	Daisia Mitchell	6 ft 0 in (1.83 m)	Jr	Mt. San Antonio College	Riverside, California
F	30	Addie Biel	6 ft 2 in (1.88 m)	Fr	Cathedral Preparatory School	Erie, Pennsylvania
F	32	Zoë McCrary	6 ft 2 in (1.88 m)	GS	College of Charleston	Allen, Texas
G	34	Emily Hege	5 ft 7 in (1.7 m)	Sr	Wingate	Lexington, North Carolina
G	54	Marta Gutierrez	5 ft 7 in (1.7 m)	Jr	Vincennes	Dénia, Spain

Head coach

- Alaura Sharp (Southwest Minnesota State)

Assistant coach(es)

- Rabun Wright (North Alabama)
- Brooklyn Taylor (Saint Francis (PA))
- Joel Harrison (Faulkner)
- LaRomeo McKee (Southern Miss)

Legend

- (C) Team captain
- (S) Suspended
- (I) Ineligible
- (W) Walk-on
- Injured
- Current redshirt

Roster
Last update: July 26, 2026

== Schedule and results ==
Date time, TV	Rank^{#}	Opponent^{#}	Result	Record	High points	High rebounds	High assists	Site (attendance) city, state
Regular season
November 3, 2025*; 6:30 pm, ESPN+		Western Michigan; MAC-SBC Challenge	W 65–45	1–0	16 – Tied	7 – McCrary	3 – Tied	Holmes Center (511); Boone, NC
November 7, 2025*; 6:30 pm, ESPN+		Bob Jones	W 110–35	2–0	22 – Biel	8 – Tied	5 – Smith	Holmes Center (271); Boone, NC
November 12, 2025*; 6:30 pm, ESPN+		Davidson	L 55–74	2–1	16 – Smith	7 – Smith	2 – Smith	Holmes Center (489); Boone, NC
November 16, 2025*; 2:00 pm, ESPN+		Wofford	W 77–50	3–1	15 – McBride	10 – Smith	7 – Smith	Holmes Center (538); Boone, NC
November 20, 2025*; 10:15 am, ESPN+		at No. 23 West Virginia	L 51−80	3−2	17 – Smith	5 – Tied	5 – Pericic	Hope Coliseum (10,067); Morgantown, WV
November 22, 2025*; 3:30 pm, ESPN+		at UNC Asheville	W 64−40	4−2	11 – Tied	7 – Tied	6 – Smith	Kimmel Arena (341); Asheville, NC
November 25, 2025*; 12:00 pm, ESPN+		Norfolk State	W 66–38	5–2	21 – Mitchell	5 – Tied	8 – Smith	Holmes Center (2,035); Boone, NC
December 1, 2025*; 7:00 pm, ESPN+		at Gardner–Webb	W 63–53	6–2	16 – Hege	7 – Atli	6 – Smith	Paul Porter Arena (450); Boiling Springs, NC
December 7, 2025*; 2:00 pm, ACCNX		at Clemson	L 59–78	6–3	13 – Tied	5 – Tied	2 – Tied	Littlejohn Coliseum (862); Clemson, SC
December 17, 2025; 11:00 am, ESPN+		at Marshall	L 62–75	6–4 (0–1)	19 – Smith	8 – Biel	5 – Smith	Cam Henderson Center (3,767); Huntington, WV
December 20, 2025; 1:00 pm, ESPN+		at Georgia Southern	L 54–67	6–5 (0–2)	16 – McBride	7 – Smith	3 – Hege	Hill Convocation Center (847); Statesboro, GA
December 29, 2025*; 6:30 pm, ESPN+		Carolina	W 82−31	7−5	17 – Biel	8 – Smith	8 – Smith	Holmes Center (303); Boone, NC
January 3, 2026; 2:00 pm, ESPN+		Marshall	L 48–53	7–6 (0–3)	12 – Biel	11 – Smith	6 – Hege	Holmes Center (573); Boone, NC
January 7, 2026; 6:30 pm, ESPN+		Coastal Carolina	L 53–69	7–7 (0–4)	15 – Mitchell	11 – Pericic	4 – Pericic	Holmes Center (302); Boone, NC
January 10, 2026; 1:00 pm, ESPN+		Southern Miss	W 82–59	8–7 (1–4)	26 – McBride	11 – Smith	5 – Tied	Holmes Center (641); Boone, NC
January 14, 2026; 6:30 pm, ESPN+		at Old Dominion	L 54–65	8–8 (1–5)	15 – McBride	7 – Tied	4 – Smith	Chartway Arena (1,569); Norfolk, VA
January 17, 2026; 2:00 pm, ESPN+		at Georgia State	L 57–79	8–9 (1–6)	18 – Smith	6 – Smith	3 – Mitchell	GSU Convocation Center (768); Atlanta, GA
January 21, 2026; 8:00 pm, ESPN+		at Texas State	L 49–63	8–10 (1–7)	14 – Smith	5 – Tied	3 – Smith	Strahan Arena (867); San Marcos, TX
January 23, 2026; 7:00 pm, ESPN+		at Louisiana	W 68–48	9–10 (2–7)	17 – Mitchell	9 – Smith	4 – Smith	Cajundome (409); Lafayette, LA
January 29, 2026; 6:30 pm, ESPN+		South Alabama	W 60–57	10–10 (3–7)	17 – Mitchell	8 – Pericic	4 – Hege	Holmes Center (401); Boone, NC
January 30, 2026; 4:00 pm, ESPN+		Louisiana–Monroe	L 70–78	10–11 (3–8)	16 – Burton	5 – Tied	4 – Tied	Holmes Center (208); Boone, NC
February 4, 2026; 7:00 pm, ESPN+		at Troy	L 59–69	10–12 (3–9)	12 – Mitchell	8 – Smith	3 – Burton	Trojan Arena (1,373); Troy, AL
February 7, 2026*; 1:00 pm, ESPN+		at Kent State; MAC-SBC Challenge	L 63–68	10–13	18 – Mitchell	6 – Pericic	4 – Smith	MAC Center (1,116); Kent, OH
February 11, 2026; 6:30 pm, ESPN+		James Madison	L 53–60	10–14 (3–10)	13 – Smith	7 – Mitchell	4 – Mitchell	Holmes Center (442); Boone, NC
February 14, 2026; 2:00 pm, ESPN+		Georgia State	W 73–67 ^{OT}	11–14 (4–10)	18 – Pericic	10 – Biel	5 – Tied	Holmes Center (513); Boone, NC
February 18, 2026; 11:00 am, ESPN+		at Coastal Carolina	L 64–65	11–15 (4–11)	22 – Smith	8 – Stoker	6 – Burton	HTC Center (1,221); Conway, SC
February 21, 2026; 2:00 pm, ESPN+		at James Madison	L 48–74	11–16 (4–12)	14 – Pericic	7 – Atli	3 – Tied	Atlantic Union Bank Center (4,690); Harrisonburg, VA
February 25, 2026; 6:30 pm, ESPN+		Georgia Southern	L 48–62	11–17 (4–13)	18 – Smith	7 – Smith	3 – Pericic	Holmes Center (638); Boone, NC
February 27, 2026; 6:30 pm, ESPN+		Old Dominion	L 65–75	11–18 (4–14)	15 – Mitchell	8 – Smith	9 – Smith	Holmes Center (408); Boone, NC
Sun Belt tournament
March 3, 2026; 12:30 pm, ESPN+	(13)	vs. (12) South Alabama; First Round	L 57–68	11–19	16 – Mitchell	7 – Smith	5 – Mitchell	Pensacola Bay Center (304); Pensacola, FL
*Non-conference game. ^{#}Rankings from AP Poll. (#) Tournament seedings in parentheses. All times are in Eastern.
