= 2025–26 Louisiana–Monroe Warhawks women's basketball team =

American college basketball season

2025–26 Louisiana–Monroe Warhawks women's basketball
- Conference: Sun Belt Conference
- Record: 17–16 (7–11 Sun Belt)
- Head coach: Scotty Fletcher (1st season)
- Associate head coach: Mendy McNeese
- Assistant coaches: Nikolas Quezada; Mikayla Etienne; Elyssa Coleman; Elise Johnson
- Home arena: Fant–Ewing Coliseum

2025–26 Sun Belt Conference women's basketball standings
	Conf.				Overall
Team	W		L	PCT	W		L	PCT
Georgia Southern	16	–	2	.889	23	–	8	.742
Troy	15	–	3	.833	25	–	8	.758
Arkansas State	14	–	4	.778	27	–	10	.730
James Madison †	14	–	4	.778	26	–	9	.743
Marshall	13	–	5	.722	28	–	9	.757
Old Dominion	9	–	9	.500	18	–	14	.563
Southern Miss	8	–	10	.444	15	–	16	.484
Texas State	7	–	11	.389	11	–	19	.367
Coastal Carolina	7	–	11	.389	14	–	18	.438
Louisiana–Monroe	7	–	11	.389	17	–	16	.515
Georgia State	5	–	13	.278	10	–	21	.323
South Alabama	5	–	13	.278	17	–	19	.472
Appalachian State	4	–	14	.222	11	–	19	.367
Louisiana	2	–	16	.111	5	–	26	.161
† 2026 Sun Belt tournament winner

The 2025–26 Louisiana–Monroe Warhawks women's basketball team represented the University of Louisiana at Monroe during the 2025–26 NCAA Division I women's basketball season. The Warhawks, led by first-year head coach Scotty Fletcher, played their home games at the Fant–Ewing Coliseum in Monroe, Louisiana as members of the Sun Belt Conference.

== Previous season ==
The Warhawks finished the 2024–25 season 11–19, 7–11 in Sun Belt play, to finish in a tie for ninth place. They were defeated by Georgia Southern in the second round of the Sun Belt tournament.

Following the season, on March 25, 2025, it was announced that head coach Missy Bilderback would be leaving the program after just two seasons, in order to take the head coaching position at her alma mater, Southern Miss. Three days later, on March 28, the school announced that they would be hiring Pearl River Community College head coach Scotty Fletcher as the team's new head coach.

== Preseason ==
On October 20, 2025, the Sun Belt Conference released their preseason poll. Louisiana–Monroe was picked to finish 13th in the conference.

=== Preseason rankings ===
Sun Belt Preseason Poll
Place	Team	Votes
1	James Madison	189 (9)
2	Arkansas State	174 (3)
3	Troy	171 (1)
4	Old Dominion	151 (1)
5	Southern Miss	125
6	Coastal Carolina	104
7	Georgia State	102
8	Marshall	100
9	Appalachian State	94
10	Georgia Southern	73
11	Louisiana	67
12	Texas State	55
13	Louisiana–Monroe	36
14	South Alabama	29
(#) first-place votes

=== Preseason All-Sun Belt Teams ===
No players were named to the Preseason All-Sun Belt First, Second, or Third Teams.

== Roster ==
2025–26 Louisiana–Monroe Warhawks women's basketball team
Players
Coaches

Pos.	#	Name	Height	Year	Previous school	Hometown
G	0	Jazmine Jackson	5 ft 8 in (1.73 m)	RS Jr	Pearl River Community College	Jacksonville, Florida
G	1	Vanessa Schwarzmann	5 ft 9 in (1.75 m)	GS	Elizabeth City State	Upper Marlboro, Maryland
F	2	Marissa Gasaway	5 ft 11 in (1.8 m)	GS	Winthrop	Louisville, Kentucky
F	3	Nailea Nicholas	6 ft 0 in (1.83 m)	Sr	San Jose State	Fresno, California
G	7	J'Mani Ingram	5 ft 7 in (1.7 m)	GS	Appalachian State	North Augusta, South Carolina
G	9	Kamille Brown	5 ft 8 in (1.73 m)	Jr	Three Rivers College	Conway, Arkansas
F	11	Keshunti Nichols	6 ft 0 in (1.83 m)	GS	Charleston Southern	Pearl, Mississippi
G	13	Abby Leahy	6 ft 1 in (1.85 m)	Jr	Northeastern Junior College	Colorado Springs, Colorado
G	15	Katelyn Chomko	5 ft 7 in (1.7 m)	Sr	Robert Morris	Houston, Texas
C	20	Roge'Ne' Hillard	6 ft 3 in (1.91 m)	Jr	Pearl River Community College	Hazlehurst, Mississippi
G	24	Asjah Inniss	5 ft 9 in (1.75 m)	GS	Appalachian State	Suwanee, Georgia
C	25	Marcavia Shavers	6 ft 2 in (1.88 m)	GS	Saint Louis	Biloxi, Mississippi
F	35	Asia Barclay	6 ft 0 in (1.83 m)	GS	Jacksonville State	Anniston, Alabama
G	44	Nakiyah Mays-Prince	5 ft 5 in (1.65 m)	Sr	Georgia Southern	Chicago, Illinois

Head coach

- Scotty Fletcher (William Carey)

Assistant coach(es)

- Mendy McNeese (Queens (NC))
- Nikolas Quezada (Miami (OH))
- Mikayla Etienne (Nicholls State)
- Elyssa Coleman (Texas–San Antonio)
- Elise Johnson (Mississippi State)

Legend

- (C) Team captain
- (S) Suspended
- (I) Ineligible
- (W) Walk-on
- Injured
- Current redshirt

Roster
Last update: July 25, 2026

== Schedule and results ==
Date time, TV	Rank^{#}	Opponent^{#}	Result	Record	High points	High rebounds	High assists	Site (attendance) city, state
Regular season
November 3, 2025*; 6:30 pm, ESPN+		Eastern Michigan; MAC-SBC Challenge	W 80–71	1–0	12 – Tied	6 – Tied	5 – Mays-Prince	Fant–Ewing Coliseum (827); Monroe, LA
November 7, 2025*; 6:30 pm, ESPN+		Louisiana Tech	W 70–62	2–0	16 – Brown	6 – Ingram	7 – Mays-Prince	Fant–Ewing Coliseum (1,593); Monroe, LA
November 11, 2025*; 6:30 pm, ESPN+		Grambling State	W 74–55	3–0	16 – Ingram	7 – Tied	4 – Mays-Prince	Fant–Ewing Coliseum (2,242); Monroe, LA
November 14, 2025*; 6:00 pm		Central Baptist	W 81–31	4–0	15 – Chomko	10 – Tied	6 – Mays-Prince	Fant–Ewing Coliseum; Monroe, LA
November 16, 2025*; 2:00 pm, ESPN+		Arkansas–Pine Bluff	W 79−50	5−0	16 – Jackson	8 – Jackson	6 – Mays-Prince	Fant–Ewing Coliseum (738); Monroe, LA
November 20, 2025*; 6:30 pm, ESPN+		at Sam Houston	L 34−57	5−1	8 – Shavers	12 – Shavers	3 – Inniss	Bernard Johnson Coliseum (432); Huntsville, TX
November 23, 2025*; 2:00 pm, ESPN+		Lamar	W 62–47	6–1	25 – Jackson	9 – Shavers	5 – Inniss	Fant–Ewing Coliseum (879); Monroe, LA
November 30, 2025*; 2:00 pm, SECN+		at Mississippi State	L 54–66	6–2	15 – Jackson	12 – Shavers	4 – Shavers	Humphrey Coliseum (3,411); Starkville, MS
December 7, 2025*; 4:00 pm, SECN+		at Alabama	L 38–75	6–3	11 – Ingram	6 – Shavers	1 – Tied	Coleman Coliseum (2,524); Tuscaloosa, AL
December 11, 2025*; 6:00 pm, B1G+		at Indiana	L 54–98	6–4	16 – Inniss	8 – Tied	2 – Mays-Prince	Simon Skjodt Assembly Hall (7,380); Bloomington, IN
December 17, 2025; 7:00 pm, ESPN+		at Arkansas State	L 58–79	6–5 (0–1)	10 – Ingram	10 – Barclay	3 – Mays-Prince	First National Bank Arena (1,179); Jonesboro, AR
December 20, 2025; 12:00 pm, ESPN+		at Texas State	L 69−79	6−6 (0–2)	17 – Jackson	5 – Tied	4 – Mays-Prince	Strahan Arena; San Marcos, TX
January 1, 2026; 1:30 pm, ESPN+		South Alabama	W 61–44	7–6 (1–2)	17 – Shavers	17 – Shavers	4 – Tied	Fant–Ewing Coliseum; Monroe, LA
January 3, 2026; 12:00 pm, ESPN+		Arkansas State	L 71–89	7–7 (1–3)	30 – Ingram	21 – Shavers	6 – Mays-Prince	Fant–Ewing Coliseum (1,301); Monroe, LA
January 8, 2026; 5:00 pm, ESPN+		at Louisiana	W 61–51	8–7 (2–3)	15 – Tied	16 – Shavers	4 – Mays-Prince	Cajundome (544); Lafayette, LA
January 10, 2026; 3:30 pm, ESPN+		at South Alabama	L 67–73	8–8 (2–4)	17 – Inniss	7 – Mays-Prince	4 – Mays-Prince	Mitchell Center (2,509); Mobile, AL
January 14, 2026; 6:30 pm, ESPN+		Troy	L 80–86	8–9 (2–5)	23 – Mays-Prince	10 – Shavers	4 – Mays-Prince	Fant–Ewing Coliseum (1,128); Monroe, LA
January 17, 2026; 12:00 pm, ESPN+		Louisiana	W 102–58	9–9 (3–5)	20 – Mays-Prince	11 – Ingram	10 – Mays-Prince	Fant–Ewing Coliseum (1,346); Monroe, LA
January 22, 2026; 6:00 pm, ESPN+		James Madison	L 68–72	9–10 (3–6)	14 – Mays-Prince	7 – Barclay	6 – Tied	Fant–Ewing Coliseum (1,167); Monroe, LA
January 23, 2026; 2:00 pm, ESPN+		Marshall	L 75–82	9–11 (3–7)	18 – Shavers	13 – Shavers	7 – Mays-Prince	Fant–Ewing Coliseum (1,021); Monroe, LA
January 28, 2026; 5:30 pm, ESPN+		at Old Dominion	L 62–85	9–12 (3–8)	19 – Mays-Prince	17 – Shavers	4 – Tied	Chartway Arena (2,503); Norfolk, VA
January 30, 2026; 3:00 pm, ESPN+		at Appalachian State	W 78–70	10–12 (4–8)	18 – Mays-Prince	7 – Shavers	6 – Mays-Prince	Holmes Center (208); Boone, NC
February 4, 2026; 6:30 pm, ESPN+		Georgia State	W 81–62	11–12 (5–8)	19 – Jackson	19 – Shavers	5 – Inniss	Fant–Ewing Coliseum (1,048); Monroe, LA
February 7, 2026*; 1:00 pm, ESPN+		at Buffalo; MAC-SBC Challenge	W 73–64	12–12	19 – Jackson	8 – Tied	6 – Tied	Alumni Arena (1,285); Amherst, NY
February 12, 2026; 5:00 pm, ESPN+		at Southern Miss	W 85–62	13–12 (6–8)	22 – Jackson	11 – Shavers	6 – Inniss	Reed Green Coliseum (2,846); Hattiesburg, MS
February 14, 2026; 1:00 pm, ESPN+		at Troy	L 80–82	13–13 (6–9)	27 – Mays-Prince	7 – Shavers	11 – Mays-Prince	Trojan Arena (1,368); Troy, AL
February 21, 2026; 12:00 pm, ESPN+		at Georgia Southern	L 54–67	13–14 (6–10)	15 – Ingram	15 – Shavers	4 – Inniss	Hill Convocation Center (1,203); Statesboro, GA
February 25, 2026; 6:30 pm, ESPN+		Texas State	W 83–74	14–14 (7–10)	34 – Jackson	8 – Tied	7 – Mays-Prince	Fant–Ewing Coliseum (1,037); Monroe, LA
February 27, 2026; 6:30 pm, ESPN+		Southern Miss	L 61–68	14–15 (7–11)	19 – Ingram	14 – Shavers	4 – Inniss	Fant–Ewing Coliseum (1,282); Monroe, LA
Sun Belt tournament
March 4, 2026; 2:00 pm, ESPN+	(10)	vs. (14) Louisiana; Second Round	W 79–63	15–15	21 – Shavers	13 – Shavers	6 – Ingram	Pensacola Bay Center (446); Pensacola, FL
March 5, 2026; 2:00 pm, ESPN+	(10)	vs. (7) Southern Miss; Third Round	W 89–72	16–15	17 – Ingram	13 – Gasaway	9 – Mays-Prince	Pensacola Bay Center (490); Pensacola, FL
March 6, 2026; 2:00 pm, ESPN+	(10)	vs. (6) Old Dominion; Fourth Round	W 68–67	17–15	26 – Shavers	9 – Gasaway	5 – Mays-Prince	Pensacola Bay Center (640); Pensacola, FL
March 7, 2026; 2:30 pm, ESPN+	(10)	vs. (3) Arkansas State; Quarterfinals	L 68–76	17–16	17 – Shavers	12 – Ingram	4 – Inniss	Pensacola Bay Center (1,945); Pensacola, FL
*Non-conference game. ^{#}Rankings from AP Poll. (#) Tournament seedings in parentheses. All times are in Central.
