= 2026 Sun Belt Conference women's basketball tournament =

- Classification: Division I
- Season: 2025–26
- Teams: 14
- Site: Pensacola Bay Center; Pensacola, Florida
- Champions: James Madison (2nd title)
- Winning coach: Sean O'Regan (2nd title)
- MVP: Peyton McDaniel (James Madison)
- Television: ESPN+, ESPNU

2025–26 Sun Belt Conference women's basketball standings
	Conf.				Overall
Team	W		L	PCT	W		L	PCT
Georgia Southern	16	–	2	.889	23	–	8	.742
Troy	15	–	3	.833	25	–	8	.758
Arkansas State	14	–	4	.778	27	–	10	.730
James Madison †	14	–	4	.778	26	–	9	.743
Marshall	13	–	5	.722	28	–	9	.757
Old Dominion	9	–	9	.500	18	–	14	.563
Southern Miss	8	–	10	.444	15	–	16	.484
Texas State	7	–	11	.389	11	–	19	.367
Coastal Carolina	7	–	11	.389	14	–	18	.438
Louisiana–Monroe	7	–	11	.389	17	–	16	.515
Georgia State	5	–	13	.278	10	–	21	.323
South Alabama	5	–	13	.278	17	–	19	.472
Appalachian State	4	–	14	.222	11	–	19	.367
Louisiana	2	–	16	.111	5	–	26	.161
† 2026 Sun Belt tournament winner

The 2026 Sun Belt Conference women's basketball tournament was the postseason women's basketball tournament for the Sun Belt Conference during the 2025–26 NCAA Division I women's basketball season. All tournament games were played at Pensacola Bay Center between March 3–9. The winner, James Madison received the Sun Belt's automatic bid to the 2026 NCAA tournament.

== Seeds ==
All 14 conference teams qualified for the tournament. Teams were seeded by record within the conference, with a tiebreaker system implemented to seed teams with identical conference records. A stepladder system was utilized, giving the top two teams byes to the tournament semifinals and the No. 3 and No. 4 teams byes to the tournament quarterfinals.

Seed	School	Conference	Tiebreaker
1	Georgia Southern	16–2	
2	Troy	15–3	
3	Arkansas State	14–4	1–0 vs. James Madison
4	James Madison	14–4	0–1 vs. Arkansas State
5	Marshall	13–5	
6	Old Dominion	9–9	
7	Southern Miss	8–10	
8	Texas State	7–11	
9	Coastal Carolina	7–11	
10	Louisiana–Monroe	7–11	
11	Georgia State	5–13	1–0 vs. South Alabama
12	South Alabama	5–13	0–1 vs. Georgia State
13	Appalachian State	4–14	
14	Louisiana	2–16	

== Schedule ==
Game	Time	Matchup	Score	Television
First round – Tuesday, March 3
1	11:30 am	No. 12 South Alabama vs. No. 13 Appalachian State	68–57	ESPN+
2	2:00 pm	No. 11 Georgia State vs. No. 14 Louisiana	66–71	ESPN+
Second round – Wednesday, March 4
3	11:30 am	No. 9 Coastal Carolina vs. No. 12 South Alabama	70–80	ESPN+
4	2:00 pm	No. 10 Louisiana–Monroe vs. No. 14 Louisiana	79–63	ESPN+
Third round – Thursday, March 5
5	11:30 am	No. 8 Texas State vs. No. 12 South Alabama	59–69	ESPN+
6	2:00 pm	No. 7 Southern Miss vs. No. 10 Louisiana–Monroe	72–89	ESPN+
Fourth round – Friday, March 6
7	11:30 am	No. 5 Marshall vs. No. 12 South Alabama	58–73	ESPN+
8	2:00 pm	No. 6 Old Dominion vs. No. 10 Louisiana–Monroe	67–68	ESPN+
Quarterfinals – Saturday, March 7
9	12:00 pm	No. 4 James Madison vs. No. 12 South Alabama	79–54	ESPN+
10	2:30 pm	No. 3 Arkansas State vs. No. 10 Louisiana–Monroe	76–68	ESPN+
Semifinals – Sunday, March 8
11	11:30 am	No. 1 Georgia Southern vs. No. 4 James Madison	53–81	ESPN+
12	2:00 pm	No. 2 Troy vs. No. 3 Arkansas State	83–73	ESPN+
Championship – Monday, March 9
13	1:00 pm	No. 2 Troy vs. No. 4 James Madison	52–69	ESPN2
Game times in CST through the quarterfinals and CDT for the semifinals and championship. Rankings denote tournament seed.

== Bracket ==
First round March 3 ESPN+
12	South Alabama	68
13	Appalachian State	57
11	Georgia State	66
14	Louisiana	71

Second round March 4 ESPN+
9	Coastal Carolina	70
12	South Alabama	80
10	Louisiana–Monroe	79
14	Louisiana	63

Third round March 5 ESPN+
8	Texas State	59
12	South Alabama	69
7	Southern Miss	72
10	Louisiana–Monroe	89

Fourth round March 6 ESPN+
5	Marshall	58
12	South Alabama	73
6	Old Dominion	67
10	Louisiana–Monroe	68

Quarterfinals; March 7 ESPN+
4	James Madison	79
12	South Alabama	54
3	Arkansas State	76
10	Louisiana–Monroe	68

Semifinals; March 8 ESPN+
1	Georgia Southern	53
4	James Madison	81
2	Troy	83
3	Arkansas State	73

Championship; March 9 ESPNU
4	James Madison	69
2	Troy	52

== See also ==
- 2026 Sun Belt Conference men's basketball tournament
