= Louisiana–Monroe Warhawks women's basketball =

ULM Warhawks women's basketball
2025–26 Louisiana–Monroe Warhawks women's basketball team
- University: University of Louisiana at Monroe
- Head coach: Scotty Fletcher (1st season)
- Conference: Sun Belt
- Location: Monroe, Louisiana
- Arena: Fant–Ewing Coliseum (capacity: 7,000)
- Nickname: Warhawks
- Student section: Hawk Nest
- Colors: Maroon and gold

Uniforms
Home	Away

NCAA tournament Final Four
- 1985
Other NCAA tournament results
Elite Eight	1985
Sweet Sixteen	1984, 1985
Appearances	1983, 1984, 1985, 1987

Conference tournament champions
- 1983

Conference regular-season champions
- 1983, 1984, 1985, 1987, 2005

The ULM Warhawks women's basketball team is the women's basketball team that represents University of Louisiana at Monroe in Monroe, Louisiana. The team currently competes in the Sun Belt Conference. Scotty Fletcher is the eleventh head coach in program history, entering his first year.

== History ==
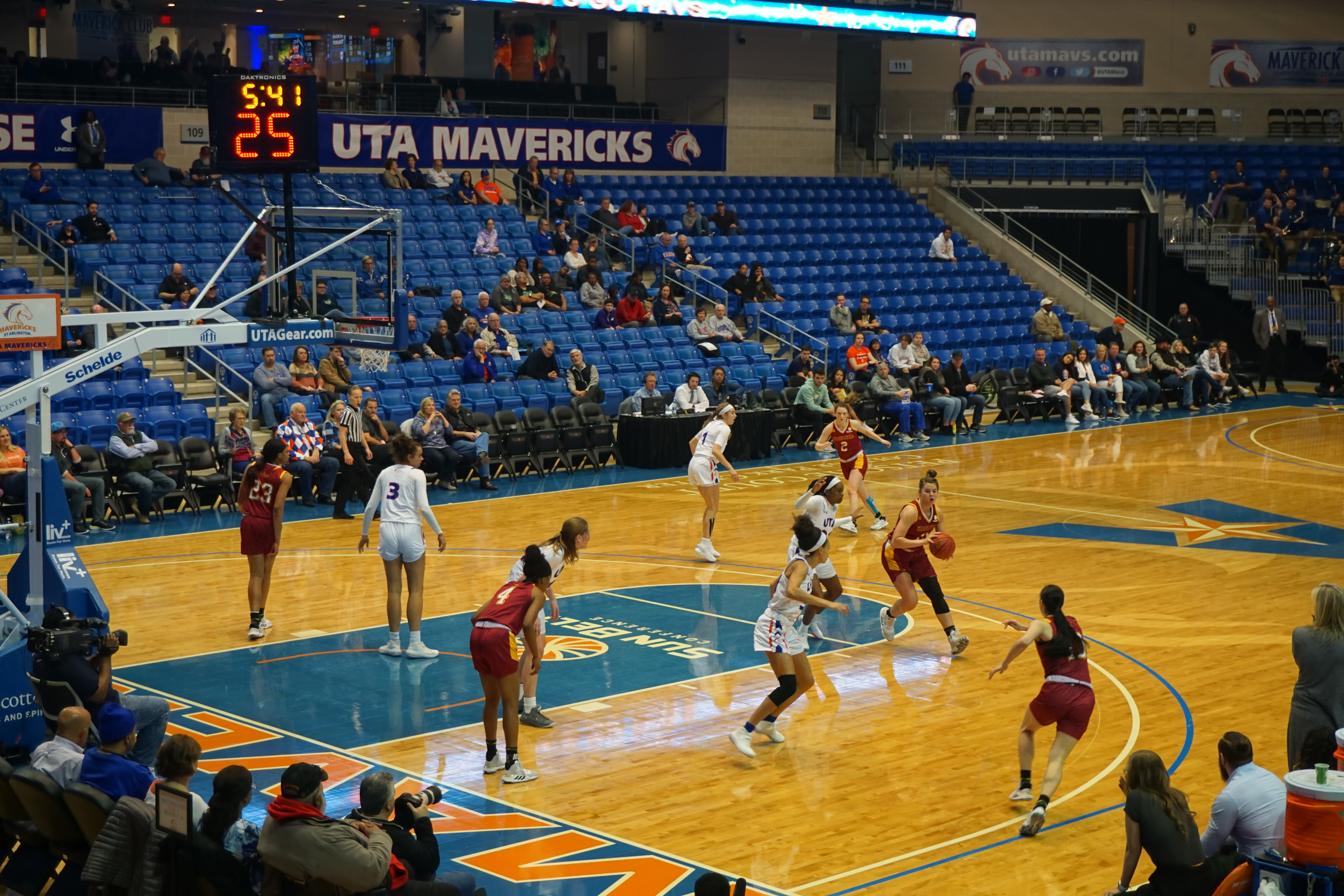
Louisiana–Monroe in action at UT Arlington

== Coaches ==
	Coach	Seasons	Wins	Losses	Win %
9	Brooks Donald-Williams	2019–23	17	94	.153
8	Jeff Dow	2014–2019	44	103	.299
7	Mona Martin	1995–2014	263	291	.475
6	Roger Stockton	1990–1995	76	71	.517
5	Linda Harper	1978–1990	212	121	.637
4	Brenda Brooks	1976–1978	11	35	.239
3	Pat Reed (Shared)	1975–1976	17	14	.548
2	Cherrie Walker (Shared)	1974–1976	26	25	.510
1	Tanya Ganney (Shared)	1974–1975	9	11	.450

== Season-by-season results ==
Statistics overview
Season	Team	Overall	Conference	Standing	Postseason
Northeast Louisiana Indians (AIAW) (1974–1981)
1974–75	Cherrie Walker	9–11			
1975–76	Cherrie Walker	17–14			
Cherrie Walker:		26–25			
1976–77	Brenda Brooks	5–17			
1977–78	Brenda Brooks	6–18			
Brenda Brooks:		11–35			
1978–79	Linda Harper	16–12			
1979–80	Linda Harper	7–23			
1980–81	Linda Harper	9–18			
1981–82	Linda Harper	12–12			
AIAW:		81–125			
Northeast Louisiana Indians (Southland) (1982–1998)
1982–83	Linda Harper	26–6	5–0		NCAA First Round
1983–84	Linda Harper	23–4	12–0		NCAA Regional
1984–85	Linda Harper	30–2	12–0		NCAA Final Four
1985–86	Linda Harper	26–3	12–0		Northern Lights Invite Champions
1986–87	Linda Harper	14–10	9–3		NCAA First Round
1987–88	Linda Harper	19–10	11–3		
1988–89	Linda Harper	19–9	11–3		
1989–90	Linda Harper	14–12	8–5		
Linda Harper:		215–139	80–14		
1990–91	Roger Stockton	18–11	11–3		
1991–92	Roger Stockton	12–16	10–8		
1992–93	Roger Stockton	19–9	13–5		
1993–94	Roger Stockton	21–14	14–4		
1994–95	Roger Stockton	6–21	6–12		
Roger Stockton:		76–71	54–31		
1995–96	Mona Martin	5–21	5–13		
1996–97	Mona Martin	5–21	4–12		
1997–98	Mona Martin	19–9	12–4		
1998–99	Mona Martin	14–15	11–7		
Northeast Louisiana Indians:		290–211	166–82		
Louisiana-Monroe Indians (Southland) (1999–2006)
1999–2000	Mona Martin	16–13	11–7		
2000–01	Mona Martin	20–9	17–3		
2001–02	Mona Martin	9–18	7–13		
2002–03	Mona Martin	15–14	11–9		
2003–04	Mona Martin	18–11	13–3		
2004–05	Mona Martin	22–8	13–3		
2005–06	Mona Martin	18–11	9–7		
Louisiana-Monroe Indians:		118–84	81–45		
Southland Conference:		408–295	247–127		
Louisiana-Monroe Warhawks (Sun Belt) (2006–present)
2006–07	Mona Martin	14–16	4–14		
2007–08	Mona Martin	17–13	10–8		
2008–09	Mona Martin	15–16	7–11		
2009–10	Mona Martin	10–19	4–14		
2010–11	Mona Martin	16–15	9–7		
2011–12	Mona Martin	9–21	7–9		
2012–13	Mona Martin	10–21	7–13		
2013–14	Mona Martin	11–20	7–11		
Mona Martin:		263–291	168–168		
2014–15	Jeff Dow	12–17	8–12		
2015–16	Jeff Dow	12–17	6–14		
2016–17	Jeff Dow	6–24	3–15		
2017–18	Jeff Dow	4–26	1–17		
2018–19	Jeff Dow	10–19	4–14		
Jeff Dow:		44–103	22–72		
2019–20	Brooks Donald-Williams	3–26	1–17		
2020–21	Brooks Donald-Williams	3–20	1–15		
Brooks Donald-Williams:		6–46	2–32		
Louisiana-Monroe Warhawks:		152–290	79–191		
Sun Belt Conference:		152–290	79–191		
Total:		641–710			
National champion Postseason invitational champion Conference regular season champion Conference regular season and conference tournament champion Division regular season champion Division regular season and conference tournament champion Conference tournament champion

== NCAA tournament results ==
Year	Seed	Round	Opponent	Result
1983	#8	First Round	#1 Southern Cal	L 85-99
1984	#6	First Round; Sweet Sixteen	#3 Kansas State #2 Texas	W 78-73; L 91-99
1985	#2	First Round; Sweet Sixteen; Elite Eight; Final Four	#7 Missouri #3 Auburn #1 Louisiana Tech #1 Old Dominion	W 85-84 (OT); W 76-71; W 85-76; L 47-57
1987	#10	First Round	#7 Kansas	L 72-78
