= 2026–27 Youngstown State Penguins women's basketball team =

American college basketball season

2026–27 Youngstown State Penguins women's basketball
- Conference: Horizon League
- Record: 3–2 (0–0 Horizon)
- Head coach: Melissa Jackson (3rd season)
- Assistant coaches: Courtney Davidson; Kayla DeCriscio; Shayna Gore; Shannon Sword
- Home arena: Beeghly Center

2026–27 Horizon League women's basketball standings
	Conf.				Overall
Team	W		L	PCT	W		L	PCT
Detroit Mercy	0	–	0	–	3	–	2	.600
Youngstown State	0	–	0	–	3	–	2	.600
Green Bay	0	–	0	–	2	–	2	.500
IU Indy	0	–	0	–	2	–	2	.500
Northern Illinois	0	–	0	–	2	–	2	.500
Robert Morris	0	–	0	–	2	–	2	.500
Northern Kentucky	0	–	0	–	2	–	3	.400
Oakland	0	–	0	–	2	–	3	.400
Purdue Fort Wayne	0	–	0	–	2	–	3	.400
Milwaukee	0	–	0	–	2	–	4	.333
Cleveland State	0	–	0	–	1	–	3	.250
Wright State	0	–	0	–	1	–	3	.250
† 2027 Horizon League tournament winner As of November 18, 2026

The 2026–27 Youngstown State Penguins women's basketball team represents Youngstown State University during the 2026–27 NCAA Division I women's basketball season. The Penguins, led by third-year head coach Melissa Jackson, play their home games at the Beeghly Center in Youngstown, Ohio as members of the Horizon League.

== Previous season ==
The Penguins finished the season 25–10, 15–5 in Horizon League play, to finish in second place. They defeated Wright State and Cleveland State in the Horizon League tournament before falling to first-seeded Green Bay in the championship game. In the WNIT, the Penguins beat Maryland Eastern Shore in the second round before losing to Marshall in the Super 16.

== Offseason ==
=== Departures ===
Youngstown State departures
Name	Number	Pos.	Height	Year	Hometown	Reason for departure
Casey Santoro	14	G	5' 4"	RS Senior	Bellevue, OH	Graduated
Sophia Gregory	21	F	6' 2"	Sophomore	Alliance, OH	Transferred to Liberty
Bella Samz	24	G	5' 8"	Junior	Oconomowoc, WI	Left program
Ashlynn Van Tassell	44	F	6' 3"	RS Freshman	Cameron, WV	Left program

=== Incoming transfers ===
Youngstown State incoming transfers
Name	Number	Pos.	Height	Year	Hometown	Previous school
Mia Kalich	21	F	6' 0"	Senior	Olmsted Falls, OH	Seton Hill
Jada Leonard	3	G	5' 8"	Fifth-year Senior	The Bronx, NY	Cleveland State
Gemma Walker	6	G	5' 10"	Junior	Venetia, PA	St. Francis (PA)

=== 2026 recruiting class ===
College recruiting
Name	Hometown	School	Height	Weight	Commit date
Evelyn McKnight; G	Copley, OH	Copley High School	5 ft 10 in (1.78 m)	N/A	Nov 13, 2025
Evelyn McKnight; G	Recruit ratings: No ratings found				
Kaitlyn Turinsky; F	Marblehead, OH	Bellevue High School	6 ft 3 in (1.91 m)	N/A	Nov 13, 2025
Kaitlyn Turinsky; F	Recruit ratings: No ratings found				
Overall recruit ranking:
Note: In many cases, Scout, Rivals, 247Sports, On3, and ESPN may conflict in their listings of height and weight.; In these cases, the average was taken. ESPN grades are on a 100-point scale.; Sources: "2026 Team Ranking". Rivals.

== Preseason ==
On October 8, 2026, the Horizon League released their preseason poll and league teams. Youngstown State was picked to finish second in the conference. Two players were named to the preseason All-Horizon League First Team.

=== Preseason rankings ===
Horizon League Preseason Coaches Poll
Place	Team	Votes
1	Green Bay	142
2	Youngstown State	132
3	Robert Morris	112
4	Oakland	108
5	IU Indy	86
6	Northern Kentucky	79
7	Cleveland State	68
8	Northern Illinois	54
9	Detroit Mercy	51
10	Milwaukee	40
11	Wright State	34
12	Purdue Fort Wayne	30

=== Preseason All-Horizon League Teams ===
Preseason All-Horizon League Teams
Team	Player	Position	Year
First	Sarah Baker	Forward	Junior
First	Jada Leonard	Guard	Fifth-year senior

== Roster ==
2025–26 Youngstown State Penguins women's basketball team
Players
Coaches

Pos.	#	Name	Height	Year	Previous school	Hometown
G	1	Evelyn McKnight	5 ft 10 in (1.78 m)	Fr	Copley High School	Copley, OH
G	2	Danielle Cameron	5 ft 9 in (1.75 m)	Jr	Olmsted Falls High School	Olmsted Falls, OH
G	3	Jada Leonard (5Y)	5 ft 8 in (1.73 m)	Sr	Cleveland State	The Bronx, NY
G	4	Erica King	5 ft 7 in (1.7 m)	Jr	St. Vincent–St. Mary High School	Akron, OH
G	5	Hayden Barrier	5 ft 7 in (1.7 m)	Jr	Montgomery County High School	Mount Sterling, KY
G	6	Gemma Walker	5 ft 10 in (1.78 m)	Jr	Saint Francis (PA)	Venetia, PA
F	7	Paulina Hernandez	6 ft 2 in (1.88 m)	Sr	Cleveland State	Oak Creek, WI
G	12	Dacia Lewandowski	5 ft 11 in (1.8 m)	Sr	Akron	Butler, PA
G	20	Brooke Adkins	6 ft 0 in (1.83 m)	So	Wayne High School	Wayne, WV
F	21	Mia Kalich	6 ft 0 in (1.83 m)	Sr	Seton Hill	Olmsted Falls, OH
F	30	Kaitlyn Turinsky	6 ft 3 in (1.91 m)	Fr	Bellevue High School	Marblehead, OH
F	50	Sarah Baker	6 ft 2 in (1.88 m)	Jr	Ryle High School	Florence, KY

Head coach

- Melissa Jackson (Richmond)

Assistant coach(es)

- Courtney Davidson (Michigan State)
- Kayla DeCriscio (Pitt–Johnstown)
- Shayna Gore (Marshall)
- Shannon Sword (Cleveland State)

Legend

- (C) Team captain
- (S) Suspended
- (I) Ineligible
- (W) Walk-on
- (5Y) Fifth-year senior
- Injured
- Current redshirt

Roster
Last update: October 20, 2026

== Schedule and results ==
Date time, TV	Rank^{#}	Opponent^{#}	Result	Record	High points	High rebounds	High assists	Site (attendance) city, state
Regular season
November 2, 2026*; 6:30 p.m., ESPN+		Hiram	W 99–26	1–1	17 – Barrier	8 – 2 tied	5 – Leonard	Beeghly Center (1,647); Youngstown, OH
November 7, 2026*; 6:30 p.m., ESPN+		Buffalo	W 86–62	2–0	17 – Leonard	9 – Kalich	5 – McKnight	Beeghly Center (1,235); Youngstown, OH
November 10, 2026*; 11:00 a.m., ESPN+		at Toledo	L 60–64	2–1	19 – Hernandez	13 – Kalich	4 – McKnight	Savage Arena (4,128); Toledo, OH
November 14, 2026*; 3:00 p.m., ESPN+		at Colorado	L 63–72	2–2	14 – McKnight	6 – Hernandez	5 – McKnight	CU Events Center (2,036); Boulder, CO
November 17, 2026*; 11:00 a.m., ESPN+		Heidelberg	W 82–37	3–2	13 – Barrier	9 – Adkins	7 – McKnight	Beeghly Center (2,966); Youngstown, OH
November 24, 2026*; 6:30 p.m., ESPN+		Akron						Beeghly Center; Youngstown, OH
November 29, 2026*; 1:00 p.m., ESPN+		at Kent State						MAC Center; Kent, OH
December 3, 2026; 6:30 p.m., ESPN+		Milwaukee						Beeghly Center; Youngstown, OH
December 5, 2026; 5:30 p.m., ESPN+		Green Bay						Beeghly Center; Youngstown, OH
December 13, 2026*; 5:00 p.m.		at USC						Galen Center; Los Angeles, CA
December 19, 2026*; 1:00 p.m.		at Fairleigh Dickinson; FDU Holiday Classic						Bogota Savings Bank Center; Hackensack, NJ
December 20, 2026*		vs. La Salle/UC San Diego; FDU Holiday Classic						Bogota Savings Bank Center; Hackensack, NJ
December 31, 2026; 2:00 p.m., ESPN+		Northern Illinois						Beeghly Center; Youngstown, OH
January 2, 2027; 1:00 p.m.		at Northern Kentucky						Truist Arena; Highland Heights, KY
January 7, 2027; 6:30 p.m.		at Oakland						OU Credit Union O'rena; Rochester, MI
January 10, 2027; 2:00 p.m.		IU Indy						Beeghly Center; Youngstown, OH
January 13, 2027; 6:30 p.m.		Purdue Fort Wayne						Beeghly Center; Youngstown, OH
January 16, 2027; 2:00 p.m.		at Cleveland State						Wolstein Center; Cleveland, OH
January 21, 2027; 6:30 p.m.		Oakland						Beeghly Center; Youngstown, OH
January 23, 2027; 2:00 p.m.		Detroit Mercy						Calihan Hall; Detroit, MI
January 28, 2027; 7:00 p.m.		at Northern Illinois						NIU Convocation Center; DeKalb, IL
January 31, 2027; 1:00 p.m.		at IU Indy						James T. Morris Arena; Indianapolis, IN
February 3, 2027; 7:00 p.m.		at Wright State						Nutter Center; Fairborn, OH
February 6, 2027; 2:00 p.m.		Robert Morris						Beeghly Center; Youngstown, OH
February 10, 2027; 7:00 p.m.		at Purdue Fort Wayne						Hilliard Gates Sports Center; Fort Wayne, IN
February 13, 2027; 2:00 p.m.		Cleveland State						Beeghly Center; Youngstown, OH
February 17, 2027; 7:00 p.m.		at Milwaukee						Klotsche Center; Milwaukee, WI
February 20, 2027; 2:00 p.m.		at Green Bay						Kress Center; Green Bay, WI
February 25, 2027; 6:30 p.m.		Wright State						Beeghly Center; Youngstown, OH
February 27, 2027; 4:00 p.m.		at Robert Morris						UPMC Events Center; Moon Township, PA
*Non-conference game. ^{#}Rankings from AP poll. (#) Tournament seedings in parentheses. All times are in Eastern.
