= 2026–27 Green Bay Phoenix women's basketball team =

American college basketball season

2026–27 Green Bay Phoenix women's basketball
- Conference: Horizon League
- Record: 2–3 (0–0 Horizon)
- Head coach: Kayla Karius (3rd season)
- Assistant coaches: Sarah Bronk; Carley Neumann; Shay Frederick; Jasmine Kondrakiewicz; Cassie Schiltz
- Home arena: Kress Events Center

2026–27 Horizon League women's basketball standings
	Conf.				Overall
Team	W		L	PCT	W		L	PCT
Detroit Mercy	0	–	0	–	3	–	2	.600
Youngstown State	0	–	0	–	3	–	2	.600
Green Bay	0	–	0	–	2	–	2	.500
IU Indy	0	–	0	–	2	–	2	.500
Northern Illinois	0	–	0	–	2	–	2	.500
Robert Morris	0	–	0	–	2	–	2	.500
Northern Kentucky	0	–	0	–	2	–	3	.400
Oakland	0	–	0	–	2	–	3	.400
Purdue Fort Wayne	0	–	0	–	2	–	3	.400
Milwaukee	0	–	0	–	2	–	4	.333
Cleveland State	0	–	0	–	1	–	3	.250
Wright State	0	–	0	–	1	–	3	.250
† 2027 Horizon League tournament winner As of November 19, 2026

The 2026–27 Green Bay Phoenix women's basketball team currently represents the University of Wisconsin–Green Bay during the 2026–27 NCAA Division I women's basketball season. The Phoenix, led by third-year head coach Kayla Karius, play their home games at the Kress Events Center in Green Bay, Wisconsin as members of the Horizon League.

== Previous season ==
The Phoenix finished the 2025–26 season 25–9, 17–3 in Horizon League play, winning the conference's regular season title for the fourth consectutive year. Jenna Guyer was voted the League's Player of the Year, the program's first honor since Mehryn Kraker in 2017. In addition, Guyer was named to the All-League First-Team and All-Defensive Team. Maddy Skorupski was named to the League's Second-Team with Meghan Schultz being named to the Third-Team. Head coach Kayla Karius was voted the League's Coach of the Year.

Despite losing three of their last five games in regular season play, the top-seed Phoenix won the Horizon League tournament championship by defeating Detroit Mercy, Purdue Fort Wayne, and two-seed Youngstown State, earning the conference's automatic bid to the NCAA tournament, their third consecutive appearance and the second for head coach Kayla Karius.

They received the #13 seed in the Sacramento #2 Region, where they would be defeated by #4 seed Minnesota 58–75 in the first round.

=== Departures ===
Departures
Name	Num.	Pos.	Height	Year	Hometown	Reason for departure
Kamy Peppler	1	G	5'7"	Senior	Hortonville, Wisconsin	Graduated
Lily Hansford	2	G	6'2"	Senior	Green Bay, Wisconsin	Graduated
Carley Duffney	20	F	5'10"	Senior	Green Bay, Wisconsin	Graduated
Ellie Buzzelle	24	G	5'8"	Senior	Rogers, Minnesota	Graduated
Jenna Guyer	30	F/C	6'2"	Senior	Circle Pines, Minnesota	Graduated

=== Incoming transfers ===
Green Bay incoming transfers
Name	Number	Pos.	Height	Year	Hometown	Previous school
Jorey Buwalda	32	F	6'0"	Senior	Randolph, Wisconsin	Milwaukee
Elisa Mevius	8	G	5'10"	RS Senior	Rendsburg, Germany	Oregon
McKenna Johnson	7	G	5'9"	Junior	Wilmot, Wisconsin	Butler

=== 2026 recruiting class ===
College recruiting
Name	Hometown	School	Height	Weight	Commit date
Ady Ketterhagen; G/F	Oostburg, WI	Oostburg High School	5 ft 10 in (1.78 m)	N/A	Apr 24, 2024
Ady Ketterhagen; G/F	Recruit ratings: No ratings found				
Riley Ketterhagen; G/F	Oostburg, WI	Oostburg High School	5 ft 10 in (1.78 m)	N/A	Apr 24, 2024
Riley Ketterhagen; G/F	Recruit ratings: No ratings found				
Lillie Johnson; G/F	Gladstone, MI	Gladstone High School	6 ft 0 in (1.83 m)	N/A	Jun 6, 2025
Lillie Johnson; G/F	Recruit ratings: No ratings found				
Kyrin Lile; F	Elkhorn, WI	Elkhorn High School	6 ft 1 in (1.85 m)	N/A	Jun 27, 2025
Kyrin Lile; F	Recruit ratings: No ratings found				

== Preseason ==
On October 8, 2026, the Horizon League released their preseason poll and league teams. Green Bay was picked to finish first in the conference. Meghan Schultz was named to the preseason All-Horizon League First Team. Graduate student Maddy Skorupski along with transfers Jorey Bulwalda and Elisa Mevius were named to the Second Team.

=== Preseason rankings ===
Horizon League Preseason Coaches Poll
Place	Team	Votes
1	Green Bay	143
2	Youngstown State	132
3	Robert Morris	112
4	Oakland	108
5	IU Indy	86
6	Northern Kentucky	79
7	Cleveland State	68
8	Northern Illinois	54
9	Detroit Mercy	51
10	Milwaukee	40
11	Purdue Fort Wayne	34
12	Wright State	30

=== Preseason All-Horizon League Teams ===
Preseason All-Horizon League Teams
Team	Player	Position	Year
First	Meghan Schultz	Forward	RS Junior
Second	Jorey Buwalda	Forward	Senior
Second	Elisa Mevius	Guard	RS Senior
Second	Maddy Skorupski	Guard	Graduate

== Roster ==
2026–27 Green Bay Phoenix women's basketball team
Players
Coaches

Pos.	#	Name	Height	Year	Previous school	Hometown
G	0	Ady Ketterhagen	5 ft 10 in (1.78 m)	Fr	Oostburg High School	Oostburg, Wisconsin
G	1	Riley Ketterhagen	5 ft 10 in (1.78 m)	Fr	Oostburg High School	Oostburg, Wisconsin
F	2	Kyrin Lile	6 ft 1 in (1.85 m)	Fr	Elkhorn High School	Elkhorn, Wisconsin
G	3	Maddy Skorupski	5 ft 8 in (1.73 m)	GS	Oakland	Clarkston, Michigan
G	4	Maren Westin	5 ft 8 in (1.73 m)	RS Jr	Becker High School	Becker, Minnesota
F	5	Sophie Lahti	6 ft 1 in (1.85 m)	RS Jr	Pine City High School	Pine City, Minnesota
G	7	McKenna Johnson	5 ft 9 in (1.75 m)	Jr	Butler	Wilmot, Wisconsin
G	8	Elisa Mevius	5 ft 10 in (1.78 m)	RS Sr	Oregon	Rendsburg, Germany
G	10	Julianna Ouimette	5 ft 10 in (1.78 m)	Sr	Lehigh	Minocqua, Wisconsin
G/F	11	Lillie Johnson	6 ft 0 in (1.83 m)	Fr	Gladstone High School	Gladstone, Michigan
G/F	13	Madison Hoffmann	6 ft 1 in (1.85 m)	So	Grayslake Central High School	Grayslake, Illinois
G	21	Kallie Peppler	6 ft 0 in (1.83 m)	Jr	Milwaukee	Hortonville, Wisconsin
F	22	Gracie Grzesk	5 ft 11 in (1.8 m)	Jr	Wisconsin	Green Bay, Wisconsin
F	32	Jorey Buwalda	6 ft 0 in (1.83 m)	Sr	Milwaukee	Randolph, Wisconsin
G/F	44	Kristina Ouimette	6 ft 1 in (1.85 m)	So	Lakeland Union High School	Minocqua, Wisconsin
F/C	55	Meghan Schultz	6 ft 4 in (1.93 m)	RS Jr	New Berlin West High School	Waukesha, Wisconsin

Head coach

- Kayla Karius (Green Bay)

Assistant coach(es)

- Sarah Bronk (St. Thomas (MN))
- Carley Neumann (St. Cloud State)
- Shay Frederick (Butler)
- Jasmine Kondrakiewicz (Green Bay)
- Cassie Schiltz (Green Bay)

Legend

- (C) Team captain
- (S) Suspended
- (I) Ineligible
- (W) Walk-on
- Injured
- Current redshirt

Roster
Last update: November 7, 2026

== Schedule and results ==
Date time, TV	Rank^{#}	Opponent^{#}	Result	Record	High points	High rebounds	High assists	Site (attendance) city, state
Exhibition
October 17, 2026*; 1:00 pm		UW–La Crosse						Kress Events Center; Green Bay, WI
October 28, 2026*; 6:30 pm		UW–Stevens Point						Kress Events Center; Green Bay, WI
Regular season
November 3, 2026*; 6:00 pm, ACCNX		at No. 4 Duke	L 60–76	0–1	16 – Skorupski	8 – Mevius	4 – Mevius	Cameron Indoor Stadium (2,838); Durham, NC
November 7, 2026*; 5:00 pm, ESPN+		Loyola Chicago	W 82–48	1–1	16 – Schultz	6 – Westin	7 – Skorupski	Kress Events Center (1,866); Green Bay, WI
November 11, 2026*; 4:30 pm		at Illinois State	L 66–75	1–2	24 – Skorupski	7 – Mevius	4 – Skorupski	CEFCU Arena (1,721); Normal, IL
November 14, 2026*; 1:00 pm, ESPN+		Wisconsin	W 81–76	2–2	24 – M. Johnson	8 – Skorupski	14 – Skorupski	Kress Events Center (3,173); Green Bay, WI
November 18, 2026*; 6:30 pm, ESPN+		No. 6 Texas	L 57–89	2–3	16 – M. Johnson	8 – Skorupski	6 – Mevius	Kress Events Center (3,003); Green Bay, WI
November 23, 2026*; 6:00 pm, ESPN+		at Northern Iowa						McLeod Center; Cedar Falls, IA
November 28, 2026*; 1:00 pm, ESPN+		Eastern Illinois						Kress Events Center; Green Bay, WI
December 3, 2026; 5:00 pm		at Robert Morris						UPMC Events Center; Moon Township, PA
December 5, 2026; 4:30 pm		at Youngstown State						Beeghly Center; Youngstown, OH
December 9, 2026*; 6:30 pm, ESPN+		UW-Stout						Kress Events Center; Green Bay, WI
December 12, 2026*; 3:00 pm, ESPN+		at Utah						Jon M. Huntsman Center; Salt Lake City, UT
December 16, 2026*; 6:30 pm, ESPN+		Wisconsin Lutheran College						Kress Events Center; Green Bay, WI
December 19, 2026*; 1:00 pm, ESPN+/WACY-TV		Miami (OH)						Kress Events Center; Green Bay, WI
December 22, 2026*; 6:00 pm, Summit League Network		at St. Thomas						Lee & Penny Anderson Arena; St. Paul, MN
December 31, 2026; 1:00 pm, ESPN+/WACY-TV		Cleveland State						Kress Events Center; Green Bay, WI
January 2, 2027; 1:00 pm, ESPN+		Purdue Fort Wayne						Kress Events Center; Green Bay, WI
January 7, 2027; 6:00 pm		at Wright State						Nutter Center; Fairborn, OH
January 10, 2027; 12:00 pm, ESPN+		at Northern Kentucky						Truist Arena; Highland Heights, KY
January 13, 2027; 6:30 pm, ESPN+		Detroit Mercy						Kress Events Center; Green Bay, WI
January 16, 2027; 2:00 pm, ESPN+		at Milwaukee						Klotsche Center; Milwaukee, WI
January 21, 2027; 6:30 pm, ESPN+		Wright State						Kress Events Center; Green Bay, WI
January 24, 2027; 1:00 pm, ESPN+		at Purdue Fort Wayne						Gates Sports Center; Fort Wayne, IN
January 28, 2027; 6:30 pm, ESPN+/WACY-TV		Robert Morris						Kress Events Center; Green Bay, WI
January 31, 2027; 1:00 pm, ESPN+		Northern Illinois						Kress Events Center; Green Bay, WI
February 3, 2027; 5:30 pm, ESPN+		at Oakland						OU Credit Union O'rena; Auburn Hills, MI
February 6, 2027; 12:00 pm		at Detroit Mercy						Calihan Hall; Detroit, MI
February 9, 2027; 6:00 pm		at Cleveland State						Wolstein Center; Cleveland, OH
February 13, 2027; 1:00 pm, ESPN+		Milwaukee						Kress Events Center; Green Bay, WI
February 17, 2027; 6:30 pm, ESPN+		IU Indy						Kress Events Center; Green Bay, WI
February 20, 2027; 1:00 pm, ESPN+		Youngstown State						Kress Events Center; Green Bay, WI
February 25, 2027; 6:00 pm		at Northern Illinois						NIU Convocation Center; DeKalb, IL
February 27, 2027; 1:00 pm, ESPN+		Northern Kentucky						Kress Events Center; Green Bay, WI
*Non-conference game. ^{#}Rankings from AP poll. (#) Tournament seedings in parentheses. All times are in Central.
