= 2025–26 Purdue Fort Wayne Mastodons women's basketball team =

American college basketball season

2025–26 Purdue Fort Wayne Mastodons women's basketball

WNIT, Super 16
- Conference: Horizon League
- Record: 21–14 (12–8 Horizon)
- Head coach: Maria Marchesano (5th season)
- Associate head coach: Steven Asher
- Assistant coaches: Quincy Cunningham; Kendal Muxlow; Lauren Ross; Wayne Kreiger
- Home arena: Gates Sports Center

2025–26 Horizon League women's basketball standings
	Conf.				Overall
Team	W		L	PCT	W		L	PCT
Green Bay †	17	–	3	.850	25	–	9	.735
Youngstown State	15	–	5	.750	25	–	10	.714
Cleveland State	13	–	7	.650	26	–	10	.722
Northern Kentucky	12	–	8	.600	15	–	17	.469
Purdue Fort Wayne	12	–	8	.600	21	–	14	.600
Robert Morris	11	–	9	.550	18	–	12	.600
IU Indy	9	–	11	.450	14	–	17	.452
Oakland	7	–	13	.350	10	–	21	.323
Wright State	6	–	14	.300	10	–	22	.313
Milwaukee	4	–	16	.200	8	–	24	.250
Detroit Mercy	4	–	16	.200	7	–	24	.226
† 2026 Horizon League tournament winner

The 2025–26 Purdue Fort Wayne Mastodons women's basketball team represented Purdue University Fort Wayne during the 2025–26 NCAA Division I women's basketball season. The Mastodons, led by fifth-year head coach Maria Marchesano, played their home games at the Gates Sports Center in Fort Wayne, Indiana, with two games at the Memorial Coliseum, as members of the Horizon League.

== Previous season ==
The Mastodons finished the 2024–25 season 27–9, 18–2 in Horizon League play, to finish in second place. They defeated Wright State and Cleveland State before falling to Green Bay in the championship game of the Horizon League tournament. They received an at-large bid to the WNIT, where they would defeat Old Dominion in the second round and Butler in the Super 16 before falling to Cleveland State in the Great 8.

== Preseason ==
On October 9, 2025, the Horizon League released their preseason poll and league teams. Purdue Fort Wayne was picked to finish fifth in the conference. One player was named to the preseason All-Horizon League Second Team.

=== Preseason rankings ===
Horizon League Preseason Coaches Poll
Place	Team	Votes
1	Green Bay	117 (8)
2	Robert Morris	97 (1)
3	Youngstown State	92 (1)
4	Cleveland State	87 (1)
5	Purdue Fort Wayne	79
6	Northern Kentucky	70
7	Detroit Mercy	59
8	Wright State	47
9	Milwaukee	29
10	IU Indy	27
11	Oakland	22
(#) first-place votes

=== Preseason All-Horizon League Teams ===
Preseason All-Horizon League Teams
Team	Player	Position	Year
Second	Jordan Reid	Forward	Graduate student

== Roster ==
2025–26 Purdue Fort Wayne Mastodons women's basketball team
Players
Coaches

Pos.	#	Name	Height	Year	Previous school	Hometown
G	1	Nika Lokica	5 ft 10 in (1.78 m)	RS Jr	Idaho State	Split, Croatia
G	2	Rylee Bess	5 ft 6 in (1.68 m)	Fr	Pickerington Central HS	Pickerington, Ohio
G	4	Ella Riggs	5 ft 9 in (1.75 m)	RS Jr	Furman	Cincinnati, Ohio
G	5	Lauren Lee	5 ft 7 in (1.7 m)	GS	Campbellsville	Dunnville, Kentucky
G	8	Bailee Duck	5 ft 8 in (1.73 m)	Fr	Assumption HS	Louisville, Kentucky
G	11	Destiny Macharia	5 ft 6 in (1.68 m)	Fr	Oakland Mills HS	Columbia, Maryland
F	14	Lili Krasovec	6 ft 3 in (1.91 m)	Jr	Boston College	Budapest, Hungary
G/F	21	Claire Gregwer	6 ft 1 in (1.85 m)	Sr	Aquinas	Grandville, Michigan
F	23	Jordan Reid	5 ft 10 in (1.78 m)	GS	Indiana Wesleyan	New Palestine, Indiana
G	24	Alyssa Berry	5 ft 7 in (1.7 m)	RS Jr	Morehead State	Houston, Texas
F	30	Avery Wagner	6 ft 4 in (1.93 m)	Fr	Waterford HS	Waterford, Ohio
F	45	Hillary Offing	5 ft 11 in (1.8 m)	RS So	Penn State Lehigh Valley	Irmo, South Carolina
F	54	Alana Nelson	5 ft 11 in (1.8 m)	GS	Spring Arbor	Springport, Michigan

Head coach

- Maria Marchesano (Butler)

Assistant coach(es)

- Steven Asher (James Madison)
- Quincy Cunningham (Purdue Fort Wayne)
- Kendal Muxlow (Purdue Fort Wayne)
- Lauren Ross (Western Michigan)
- Wayne Kreiger (Manchester)

Legend

- (C) Team captain
- (S) Suspended
- (I) Ineligible
- (W) Walk-on
- Injured
- Current redshirt

Roster
Last update: May 16, 2026

== Schedule and results ==
Date time, TV	Rank^{#}	Opponent^{#}	Result	Record	High points	High rebounds	High assists	Site (attendance) city, state
Exhibition
October 23, 2025; 11:00 am		Manchester	W 92–30	–	15 – Nelson	8 – Wagner	7 – Bess	Gates Sports Center (873); Fort Wayne, IN
Regular season
November 3, 2025*; 7:00 pm, ESPN+		at West Virginia	L 47–83	0–1	9 – 2 tied	6 – Nelson	4 – Reid	WVU Coliseum (2,534); Morgantown, WV
November 7, 2025*; 6:30 pm, ESPN+		at Xavier	L 61–62	0–2	23 – Nelson	10 – Reid	7 – Krasovec	Cintas Center (692); Cincinnati, OH
November 12, 2025*; 7:00 pm, ESPN+		Purdue	W 68–67	1–2	21 – Reid	7 – Reid	5 – Lee	Gates Sports Center (1,158); Fort Wayne, IN
November 15, 2025*; 5:00 pm, ESPN+		Southern Illinois	W 85–60	2–2	23 – Reid	6 – Lee	4 – Krasovec	Gates Sports Center (1,001); Fort Wayne, IN
November 19, 2025*; 7:00 pm, ESPN+		Eastern Michigan	W 67–52	3–2	15 – Krasovec	8 – Reid	2 – 2 tied	Gates Sports Center; Fort Wayne, IN
November 24, 2025*; 6:00 pm, FloHoops		vs. Nebraska; Emerald Coast Classic	L 57–80	3–3	17 – Bess	4 – 2 tied	5 – Reid	Raider Arena (800); Niceville, FL
November 25, 2025*; 6:00 pm, FloHoops		vs. Northwestern State; Emerald Coast Classic	W 77–68	4–3	25 – Nelson	7 – Nelson	4 – Nelson	Raider Arena (200); Niceville, FL
November 30, 2025*; 2:00 pm, ESPN+		at Bowling Green	L 53–56	4–4	13 – 2 tied	11 – Reid	3 – Reid	Stroh Center (1,042); Bowling Green, OH
December 3, 2025; 6:30 pm, ESPN+		at IU Indy	W 74–68	5–4 (1–0)	23 – Nelson	7 – Reid	5 – Lee	The Jungle (454); Indianapolis, IN
December 7, 2025; 2:00 pm, ESPN+		Wright State	W 68–52	6–4 (2–0)	26 – Nelson	9 – Krasovec	6 – Lee	Gates Sports Center (582); Fort Wayne, IN
December 10, 2025; 5:00 pm, ESPN+		Milwaukee	W 70–60	7–4 (3–0)	20 – Nelson	7 – Reid	4 – Lee	Memorial Coliseum (2,092); Fort Wayne, IN
December 14, 2025*; 2:00 pm, ESPN+		Northern Illinois	W 67–44	8–4	16 – Krasovec	13 – Nelson	3 – 2 tied	Memorial Coliseum (2,383); Fort Wayne, IN
December 19, 2025*; 2:00 pm, ESPN+		Aquinas	W 104–31	9–4	26 – Nelson	7 – 2 tied	4 – 2 tied	Gates Sports Center (457); Fort Wayne, IN
December 29, 2025; 7:00 pm, ESPN+		Northern Kentucky	L 85–88 ^{OT}	9–5 (3–1)	21 – Nelson	9 – Krasovec	4 – Lee	Gates Sports Center (582); Fort Wayne, IN
January 2, 2026; 6:30 pm, ESPN+		at Oakland	W 84–64	10–5 (4–1)	24 – Nelson	5 – 2 tied	6 – Lokica	OU Credit Union O'rena (653); Rochester, MI
January 5, 2026; 7:00 pm, ESPN+		IU Indy	W 71–46	11–5 (5–1)	15 – Nelson	7 – Nelson	6 – Lee	Gates Sports Center (509); Fort Wayne, IN
January 8, 2026; 6:00 pm, ESPN+		at Robert Morris	L 64–74	11–6 (5–2)	14 – Bess	8 – Nelson	3 – 2 tied	UPMC Events Center (281); Moon Township, PA
January 10, 2026; 2:00 pm, ESPN+		at Youngstown State	L 54–58	11–7 (5–3)	20 – Bess	6 – Reid	5 – Lee	Beeghly Center (1,294); Youngstown, OH
January 14, 2026; 7:00 pm, ESPN+		at Green Bay	L 57–69	11–8 (5–4)	10 – Bess	6 – 2 tied	4 – Lee	Kress Events Center (1,808); Green Bay, WI
January 21, 2026; 7:00 pm, ESPN+		Cleveland State	W 80–70	12–8 (6–4)	23 – Nelson	6 – 2 tied	4 – 2 tied	Gates Sports Center (535); Fort Wayne, IN
January 24, 2026; 1:00 pm, ESPN+		at Northern Kentucky	W 97–91 ^{OT}	13–8 (7–4)	27 – Bess	8 – Nelson	4 – Lee	Truist Arena (1,142); Highland Heights, KY
January 27, 2026; 7:00 pm, ESPN+		Robert Morris	W 60–46	14–8 (8–4)	24 – Krasovec	7 – Krasovec	2 – 3 tied	Gates Sports Center (653); Fort Wayne, IN
February 1, 2026; 2:00 pm, ESPN+		Detroit Mercy	W 95–66	15–8 (9–4)	25 – Nelson	8 – Krasovec	5 – Lee	Gates Sports Center (652); Fort Wayne, IN
February 5, 2026; 7:00 pm, ESPN+		at Wright State	L 67–70	15–9 (9–5)	19 – Reid	8 – Nelson	3 – Nelson	Nutter Center (1,087); Fairborn, OH
February 7, 2026; 2:00 pm, ESPN+		at Cleveland State	L 56–73	15–10 (9–6)	21 – Offing	7 – Krasovec	3 – 2 tied	Wolstein Center (678); Cleveland, OH
February 14, 2026; 1:00 pm, ESPN+		at Detroit Mercy	W 84–68	16–10 (10–6)	20 – Reid	10 – Krasovec	7 – Lee	Calihan Hall (455); Detroit, MI
February 18, 2026; 7:00 pm, ESPN+		Oakland	L 64–71	16–11 (10–7)	14 – 2 tied	6 – 3 tied	3 – Lee	Gates Sports Center (722); Fort Wayne, IN
February 21, 2026; 2:00 pm, ESPN+		Youngstown State	L 71–76	16–12 (10–8)	21 – Nelson	8 – Reid	4 – 2 tied	Gates Sports Center (683); Fort Wayne, IN
February 25, 2026; 7:00 pm, ESPN+		at Milwaukee	W 71–52	17–12 (11–8)	17 – Nelson	8 – Nelson	5 – Lee	Klotsche Center (436); Milwaukee, WI
February 28, 2026; 2:00 pm, ESPN+		Green Bay	W 71–66	18–12 (12–8)	18 – Nelson	5 – Reid	3 – 2 tied	Gates Sports Center (702); Fort Wayne, IN
Horizon League tournament
March 4, 2026; 7:00 pm, ESPN+	(5)	(6) Robert Morris; First Round	W 73–43	19–12	15 – Reid	9 – Krasovec	3 – 2 tied	Gates Sports Center (640); Fort Wayne, IN
March 8, 2026; 1:00 pm, ESPN+	(5)	vs. (7) IU Indy; Second Round	W 85–49	20–12	14 – Offing	8 – 2 tied	4 – Riggs	Corteva Coliseum; Indianapolis, IN
March 9, 2026; 12:00 pm, ESPN+	(5)	vs. (1) Green Bay; Semifinals	L 48–73	20–13	14 – Reid	4 – 3 tied	3 – Lee	Corteva Coliseum; Indianapolis, IN
WNIT
March 24, 2026*; 7:00 pm, ESPN+		South Alabama; Second Round	W 77–72	21–13	37 – Nelson	8 – Krasovec	4 – Nelson	Gates Sports Center (653); Fort Wayne, IN
March 27, 2026*; 2:00 pm, ESPN+		at Arkansas State; Super 16	L 72–83	21–14	24 – Nelson	10 – Krasovec	4 – Nelson	First National Bank Arena (1,122); Jonesboro, AR
*Non-conference game. ^{#}Rankings from AP poll. (#) Tournament seedings in parentheses. All times are in Eastern.
