= 2025–26 Arkansas State Red Wolves women's basketball team =

Intercollegiate basketball season

2025–26 Arkansas State Red Wolves women's basketball

WNIT, Fab Four
- Conference: Sun Belt Conference
- Record: 27–10 (14–4 Sun Belt)
- Head coach: Destinee Rogers (5th season)
- Assistant coaches: Lizzie Nessling; Rudy Evans; Colton Crowder
- Home arena: First National Bank Arena

2025–26 Sun Belt Conference women's basketball standings
	Conf.				Overall
Team	W		L	PCT	W		L	PCT
Georgia Southern	16	–	2	.889	23	–	8	.742
Troy	15	–	3	.833	25	–	8	.758
Arkansas State	14	–	4	.778	27	–	10	.730
James Madison †	14	–	4	.778	26	–	9	.743
Marshall	13	–	5	.722	28	–	9	.757
Old Dominion	9	–	9	.500	18	–	14	.563
Southern Miss	8	–	10	.444	15	–	16	.484
Texas State	7	–	11	.389	11	–	19	.367
Coastal Carolina	7	–	11	.389	14	–	18	.438
Louisiana–Monroe	7	–	11	.389	17	–	16	.515
Georgia State	5	–	13	.278	10	–	21	.323
South Alabama	5	–	13	.278	17	–	19	.472
Appalachian State	4	–	14	.222	11	–	19	.367
Louisiana	2	–	16	.111	5	–	26	.161
† 2026 Sun Belt tournament winner

The 2025–26 Arkansas State Red Wolves women's basketball team represents Arkansas State University during the 2025–26 NCAA Division I women's basketball season. The Red Wolves, led by fifth-year head coach Destinee Rogers, play all home games at the First National Bank Arena in Jonesboro, Arkansas along with the men's basketball team. They are members of the Sun Belt Conference.

In the previous season, the Red Wolves received their first NCAA Division I tournament bid by defeating James Madison in the 2025 Sun Belt tournament championship 86–79.

== Preseason ==
On October 20, 2025, the Sun Belt Conference released their preseason coaches poll. Arkansas State was picked to finish second in the Sun Belt regular season.

=== Preseason rankings ===
Sun Belt preseason poll
Predicted finish	Team	Votes (1st place)
1	James Madison	189 (9)
2	Arkansas State	174 (3)
3	Troy	171 (1)
4	Old Dominion	151 (1)
5	Southern Miss	125
6	Coastal Carolina	104
7	Georgia State	102
8	Marshall	100
9	Appalachian State	94
10	Georgia Southern	73
11	Louisiana	67
12	Texas State	55
13	Louisiana–Monroe	36
14	South Alabama	29

=== Preseason All-Sun Belt Teams ===
Preseason All-Sun Belt teams
Team	Player	Position	Year
First	Crislyn Rose	Guard	Junior
Second	Zyion Shannon	Guard	Senior

== Roster ==
2025–26 Arkansas State Red Wolves women's basketball team
Players
Coaches

Pos.	#	Name	Height	Year	Previous school	Hometown
G	0	D'Arrah Allen	5 ft 8 in (1.73 m)	Sr	Leuzinger HS; Seward County CC; UTEP; Arkansas–Pine Bluff	Compton, CA
G	1	Crislyn Rose	5 ft 8 in (1.73 m)	Jr	Sachse HS	Sachse, TX
G	2	Wynter Rogers	6 ft 0 in (1.83 m)	RS Sr	Little Rock Christian; West Virginia	Little Rock, AR
G	3	Mia Tarver	5 ft 7 in (1.7 m)	Sr	East HS; Salt Lake CC; Utah State	Salt Lake City, UT
G	4	Payton Fields	6 ft 0 in (1.83 m)		Pebble Hills HS; Western Nebraska CC; St. Bonaventure	El Paso, TX
G	5	Marley Dickerson	5 ft 10 in (1.78 m)	Sr	Central Dauphin HS; Niagara	Harrisburg, PA
C	6	Yves Cox	6 ft 2 in (1.88 m)	So	Link Academy; Cal State Northridge	Savannah, TX
G	11	Aniyah Ruddock	5 ft 8 in (1.73 m)	Jr	Blanche Ely HS; St. Petersburg; Chipola	Pompano Beach, FL
G	12	Mimi McCollister	5 ft 6 in (1.68 m)		Athens HS; Old Dominion	Athens, TX
G	21	Zyion Shannon	5 ft 8 in (1.73 m)	Sr	Stewarts Creek HS; Tennessee State	Smyrna, TN
G	23	Bella Weary	5 ft 6 in (1.68 m)	RS Sr	DME Academy; Daytona State	Jacksonville, FL
F	24	Allyson Ferguson	6 ft 1 in (1.85 m)	Jr	Manvel HS; Northwest Florida State	Houston, TX

Head coach

- Destinee Rogers (Central Arkansas)

Assistant coach(es)

- Lizzie Nessling (Saint Mary)
- Rudy Evans (Berea)
- Colton Crowder (Arkansas)

Legend

- (C) Team captain
- (S) Suspended
- (I) Ineligible
- (W) Walk-on
- Injured
- Current redshirt

Roster
Last update: 3 January 2026

== Schedule and results ==
Date time, TV	Rank^{#}	Opponent^{#}	Result	Record	High points	High rebounds	High assists	Site city, state
Regular season
November 3, 2025*; 7:00 p.m., ESPN+		Ball State; MAC–SBC Challenge	L 66–68	0–1	20 – Rose	10 – Rogers	3 – McCollister	First National Bank Arena (1,541); Jonesboro, AR
November 7, 2025*; 11:00 a.m., ESPN+		at Tarleton State	W 87–77 ^{OT}	1–1	26 – Rose	9 – Dickerson	4 – Rose	EECU Center (1,103); Stephenville, TX
November 11, 2025*; 6:30 p.m., ESPN+		at Missouri	L 75–97	1–2	26 – Shannon	7 – Rogers	4 – Rose	Mizzou Arena (2,625); Columbia, MO
November 15, 2025*; 4:00 p.m., ESPN+		Little Rock	W 76–67	2–2	18 – Shannon	6 – Rogers	5 – Weary	First National Bank Arena (2,811); Jonesboro, AR
November 19, 2025*; 6:30 p.m., ESPN+		at Central Arkansas	L 58–81	2–3	20 – Shannon	8 – Rogers	3 – McCollister	Farris Center (839); Conway, AR
November 23, 2025*; 3:00 p.m., ESPN+		at Jackson State	W 75–69	3–3	12 – Weary	10 – Rogers	6 – Rose	Williams Center (230); Jackson, MS
November 28, 2025*; 1:30 p.m., FloSports		vs. Houston; Baha Mar Hoops Nassau Championship	W 83–66	4–3	15 – Shannon	8 – Cox	4 – Rogers	Baha Mar Convention Center (237); Nassau, Bahamas
November 30, 2025*; 1:30 p.m., FloSports		vs. Kent State; Baha Mar Hoops Nassau Championship	W 74–54	5–3	17 – Allen	10 – Rogers	6 – Rose	Baha Mar Convention Center (237); Nassau, Bahamas
December 3, 2025*; 7:00 p.m., ESPN+		Florida Gulf Coast	W 68–58	6–3	22 – Rose	9 – Shannon	4 – Shannon	First National Bank Arena (954); Jonesboro, AR
December 6, 2025*; 2:00 p.m., ESPN+		UT Martin	W 78–66	7–3	17 – Rogers	8 – Rogers	5 – Rose	First National Bank Arena (1,007); Jonesboro, AR
December 9, 2025; 7:00 p.m., ESPN+		Southern Arkansas	W 97–46	8–3	18 – McCollister	8 – Rogers	3 – Rose	First National Bank Arena (1,127); Jonesboro, AR
December 17, 2025; 7:00 p.m., ESPN+		Louisiana–Monroe	W 79–58	9–3 (1–0)	18 – Dickerson	8 – Cox	6 – Rose	First National Bank Arena (1,179); Jonesboro, AR
December 20, 2025; 2:00 p.m., ESPN+		South Alabama	W 74–61	10–3 (2–0)	14 – Rose	7 – Cox	4 – McCollister	First National Bank Arena (1,086); Jonesboro, AR
December 28, 2025*; 2:00 p.m., ESPN+		at Arkansas	W 81–72	11–3	18 – Tarver	8 – Rogers	8 – Rose	Bud Walton Arena (2,834); Fayetteville, AR
January 1, 2026; 6:00 p.m., ESPN+		at Southern Miss	W 91–83	12–3 (3–0)	23 – Rose	8 – TEAM	5 – McCollister	Reed Green Coliseum (1,178); Hattiesburg, MS
January 3, 2026; 12:00 p.m., ESPN+		at Louisiana–Monroe	W 89–71	13–3 (4–0)	16 – Rose	8 – Rogers	6 – Rose	Fant–Ewing Coliseum (1,301); Monroe, LA
January 8, 2026; 7:00 p.m., ESPN+		at South Alabama	W 107-67	14-3 (5-0)	20 – Allen	8 – Cox	5 – McCollister	Mitchell Center (367); Mobile, AL
January 10, 2026; 3:30 p.m., ESPN+		at Troy	L 64-86	14-4 (5-1)	19 – Rose	7 – Rogers	6 – Rose	Trojan Arena (1,927); Troy, AL
January 15, 2026; 7:00 p.m., ESPN+		Louisiana	W 75-34	15-4 (6-1)	17 – Weary	11 – Cox	5 – Rose	First National Bank Arena (1,123); Jonesboro, AR
January 17, 2026; 2:00 p.m., ESPN+		Southern Miss	W 81-71	16-4 (7-1)	26 – Shannon	9 – Rogers	5 – Rose	First National Bank Arena (2,067); Jonesboro, AR
January 21, 2026; 11:00 a.m., ESPN+		Old Dominion	W 84-55	17-4 (8-1)	15 – McCollister	10 – Dickerson	5 – McCollister	First National Bank Arena (3,567); Jonesboro, AR
January 25, 2026; 3:00 p.m., ESPN+		James Madison	W 74-67	18-4 (9-1)	28 – Rose	5 – Tied	8 – Rose	First National Bank Arena (1,167); Jonesboro, AR
January 29, 2026; 10:00 a.m., ESPN+		at Georgia State	W 69-61	19-4 (10-1)	14 – Rose	9 – Cox	5 – Rose	Georgia State Convocation Center (6,762); Atlanta, GA
February 4, 2026; 7:00 p.m., ESPN+		Coastal Carolina	W 78-70	20-4 (11-1)	21 – Rose	8 – Rogers	4 – McCollister	First National Bank Arena (1,423); Jonesboro, AR
February 7, 2026; 2:00 p.m., ESPN+		at Eastern Michigan; MAC-SBC Challenge	L 73-76 ^{OT}	20-5	15 – Rose	10 – Rogers	6 – Rose	George Gervin GameAbove Center (1,086); Ypsilanti, MI
February 11, 2026; 12:00 p.m., ESPN+		at Georgia Southern	L 60-69	20-6 (11-2)	11 – Tied	8 – Rogers	4 – Rose	Hill Convocation Center (1,872); Statesboro, GA
February 14, 2026; 12:00 p.m., ESPN+		at Marshall	L 54-62	20-7 (11-3)	17 – Shannon	10 – Cox	5 – Rose	Cam Henderson Center (1,576); Huntington, WV
February 18, 2026; 7:00 p.m., ESPN+		at Texas State	W 75-61	21-7 (12-3)	22 – Shannon	4 – McCollister	3 – Tied	Strahan Arena (1,190); San Marcos, TX
February 21, 2026; 3:00 p.m., ESPN+		at Louisiana	W 92-66	22-7 (13-3)	17 – Tied	7 – Rose	4 – Rose	Cajundome (846); Lafayette, LA
February 24, 2026; 5:00 p.m., ESPN+		Troy	L 54-61	22-8 (13-4)	15 – Shannon	8 – Rose	2 – Rose	First National Bank Arena (4,875); Jonesboro, AR
February 27, 2026; 5:00 p.m., ESPN+		Texas State	W 87-53	23-8 (14-4)	15 – Tarver	6 – Weary	7 – Rose	First National Bank Arena (5,074); Jonesboro, AR
SBC tournament
March 7, 2026; 2:30 p.m., ESPN+	(3)	vs. (10) Louisiana-Monroe; Quarterfinals	W 76-68	24-8	15 – Tarver	7 – Tied	9 – Rose	Pensacola Bay Center (1,945); Pensacola, FL
March 8, 2026; 2:00 p.m., ESPN+	(3)	vs. (2) Troy; Semifinals	L 73-83	24-9	18 – Allen	6 – McCollister	5 – Tied	Pensacola Bay Center (1,242); Pensacola, FL
WNIT
March 23, 2026*; 7:00 p.m., ESPN+		Radford; Second round	W 83–52	25–9	17 – Tied	10 – Rogers	5 – Rose	First National Bank Arena (1,306); Jonesboro, AR
March 27, 2026*; 1:00 p.m., ESPN+		Purdue Fort Wayne; Super 16	W 83–72	26–9	21 – Ruddock	5 – Rogers	7 – Rose	First National Bank Arena (1,122); Jonesboro, AR
March 30, 2026*; 7:00 p.m., ESPN+		Cleveland State; Great 8	W 71–53	27–9	20 – Rogers	7 – Rose	6 – Rose	First National Bank Arena (2,258); Jonesboro, AR
April 1, 2026*; 7:00 p.m., ESPN+		Marshall; Fab 4	L 62–69	27–10	19 – Weary	7 – Weary	6 – Rose	First National Bank Arena (2,683); Jonesboro, AR
*Non-conference game. ^{#}Rankings from AP poll. (#) Tournament seedings in parentheses. All times are in Central.

== See also ==
- 2025–26 Arkansas State Red Wolves men's basketball team
