= Youngstown State Penguins women's basketball =

American college basketball program

Youngstown State Penguins
2026–27 Youngstown State Penguins women's basketball team
- University: Youngstown State University
- Head coach: Melissa Jackson (3rd season)
- Location: Youngstown, Ohio
- Arena: Beeghly Center (capacity: 4,633)
- Conference: Horizon League
- Nickname: Penguins
- Colors: Red, white, and black

NCAA Division I tournament round of 32
- 1998

NCAA Division I tournament appearances
- 1996, 1998, 2000

Conference tournament champions
- 1996, 1998, 2000

Conference regular-season champions
- 1995, 1996, 1997, 1998, 1999, 2022

The Youngstown State Penguins women's basketball team represents Youngstown State University in Youngstown, Ohio, United States. The school's team currently competes in the Horizon League. On March 14, 2024, Melissa Jackson was named the new head coach of Youngstown State University.

== History ==
The Penguins have made the NCAA Tournament three times, all coinciding with their Summit League tournament titles. Of the three, they have one postseason win, in 1998. As a 12 seed, they upset Memphis, 91–80. They lost to North Carolina State, 88–61, in the next round. As of the end of the 2025–26 season, Youngstown State has an all-time record of 732–683.

== Year by year results ==
Record table
Season	Coach	Overall	Conference	Standing	Postseason
Youngstown State (Ohio Association for Intercollegiate Sports for Women) (1975–1981)
1975–76	Joyce Ramsey	9–4	N/A		
1976–77	Joyce Ramsey	9–9	N/A		
1977–78	Joyce Ramsey	12–3	N/A		
1978–79	Joyce Ramsey	20–3	N/A		
1979–80	Joyce Ramsey	13–5	N/A		
1980–81	Joyce Ramsey	20–5	N/A		
Youngstown State (Ohio Valley Conference) (1981–1988)
1981–82	Joyce Ramsey	10–12	N/A	N/A	
Joyce Ramsey:		93–41 (.694)			
1982–83	Jeff Cohen	11–16	N/A	N/A	
Jeff Cohen:		11–16 (.407)			
1983–84	Ed DiGregorio	7–17	3–11	7th	
1984–85	Ed DiGregorio	14–13	5–9	6th	
1985–86	Ed DiGregorio	12–16	8–6	3rd	
1986–87	Ed DiGregorio	13–14	6–8	6th	
1987–88	Ed DiGregorio	18–10	9–5	4th	
Youngstown State (Independent) (1988–1992)
1988–89	Ed DiGregorio	14–14	N/A		
1989–90	Ed DiGregorio	17–10	N/A		
1990–91	Ed DiGregorio	24–4	N/A		
1991–92	Ed DiGregorio	19–9	N/A		
Youngstown State (Mid-Continent Conference) (1992–2001)
1992–93	Ed DiGregorio	17–11	11–5	3rd	
1993–94	Ed DiGregorio	6–20	3–15	T–9th	
1994–95	Ed DiGregorio	17–11	14–4	T–1st	
1995–96	Ed DiGregorio	20–9	14–4	1st	NCAA First Round
1996–97	Ed DiGregorio	23–6	13–3	T–1st	
1997–98	Ed DiGregorio	28–3	15–1	1st	NCAA Second Round
1998–99	Ed DiGregorio	20–9	10–4	T–1st	
1999–2000	Ed DiGregorio	23–8	13–3	2nd	NCAA First Round
2000–01	Ed DiGregorio	10–18	6–10	8th	
Youngstown State (Horizon League) (2001–present)
2001–02	Ed DiGregorio	12–16	8–8	T–4th	
2002–03	Ed DiGregorio	6–22	3–13	T–8th	
Ed DiGregorio:		320–240 (.571)	141–109 (.564)		
2003–04	Tisha Hill	4–24	2–14	9th	
2004–05	Tisha Hill	12–18	6–10	6th	
2005–06	Tisha Hill	8–20	4–12	7th	
2006–07	Tisha Hill	7–21	5–11	T–6th	
2007–08	Tisha Hill	14–17	8–10	7th	
Tisha Hill:		45–98 (.315)	25–57 (.305)		
2008–09	Cindy Martin	3–27	1–17	10th	
2009–10	Cindy Martin	0–30	0–18	10th	
Cindy Martin:		3–57 (.050)	1–35 (.028)		
2010–11	Bob Boldon	6–24	4–14	T–9th	
2011–12	Bob Boldon	10–20	4–14	10th	
2012–13	Bob Boldon	23–10	11–5	2nd	WNIT Second Round
Bob Boldon:		39–54 (.419)	19–33 (.365)		
2013–14	John Barnes	15–16	10–6	T–3rd	
2014–15	John Barnes	21–11	9–7	4th	WNIT First Round
2015–16	John Barnes	21–13	9–9	T–5th	WBI Semifinals
2016–17	John Barnes	9–21	5–13	T–7th	
2017–18	John Barnes	16–16	11–7	T–4th	WBI First Round
2018–19	John Barnes	22–10	13–5	T–3rd	WNIT First Round
2019–20	John Barnes	13–17	6–12	T–7th	
2020–21	John Barnes	10–8	9–7	7th	
2021–22	John Barnes	24–7	18–4	2nd	WNIT First Round
2022–23	John Barnes	19–11	13–7	T–3nd	
John Barnes:		170–130 (.567)	103–77 (.572)		
2023–24	John Nicolais	14–18	9–11	T–6th	
John Nicolais (Interim):		14–18 (.438)	9–11 (.450)		
2024–25	Melissa Jackson	12–19	7–13	T–8th	
2025–26	Melissa Jackson	25–10	15–5	2nd	WNIT Super Sixteen
Melissa Jackson:		37–29 (.561)	22–18 (.550)		
Total:		732–683 (.517)	320–340 (.485)		
National champion Postseason invitational champion Conference regular season champion Conference regular season and conference tournament champion Division regular season champion Division regular season and conference tournament champion Conference tournament champion

== Postseason ==
=== NCAA tournament history ===
Youngstown State has appeared in the NCAA Division I women's basketball tournament three times. Their record is 1–3.

Year	Seed	Round	Opponent	Result
1996	#15	First Round	#2 Penn State	L 71–94
1998	#12	First Round; Second Round	#5 Memphis #4 NC State	W 91–80; L 61–88
2000	#15	First Round	#2 Penn State	L 63–83

=== WNIT history ===
Youngstown State has appeared in the Women's National Invitation Tournament five times. Their record is 2–5.

Year	Round	Opponent	Result
2013	First Round; Second Round	Indiana State; Toledo	W 63–51; L 43–61
2015	First Round	Duquesne	L 54–72
2019	First Round	Cincinnati	L 62–76
2022	First Round	Kent State	L 59–68
2026	Second Round; Super 16	UMEC; Marshall	W 61–42; L 46–72

=== WBI history ===
Youngstown State has appeared in the Women's Basketball Invitational two times. Their record is 2–2.

Year	Seed	Round	Opponent	Result
2016	#2	First Round; Quarterfinals; Semifinals	Stony Brook; UMBC; Louisiana–Lafayette	W 67–60; W 67–48; L 49–69
2018		First Round	Binghamton	L 59–70
