= 2026–27 Ohio Bobcats women's basketball team =

Intercollegiate basketball season

2026–27 Ohio Bobcats women's basketball
- Conference: Mid-American Conference
- Record: 3–1 (0–0 MAC)
- Head coach: Bob Boldon (14th season)
- Assistant coaches: Tavares Jackson; Chelsea Welch; Kaylee Gregory Bambule; Abby Garnett
- Home arena: Convocation Center

2026–27 Mid-American Conference women's basketball standings
| | Conf. | | | | Overall |
| Team | W | | L | PCT | W | | L | PCT |
|---|---|---|---|---|---|---|---|---|
| Miami (OH) | 0 | – | 0 | – | 5 | – | 0 | 1.000 |
| Bowling Green | 0 | – | 0 | – | 4 | – | 0 | 1.000 |
| Ohio | 0 | – | 0 | – | 3 | – | 1 | .750 |
| UMass | 0 | – | 0 | – | 3 | – | 2 | .600 |
| Buffalo | 0 | – | 0 | – | 2 | – | 2 | .500 |
| Toledo | 0 | – | 0 | – | 2 | – | 2 | .500 |
| Western Michigan | 0 | – | 0 | – | 1 | – | 2 | .333 |
| Ball State | 0 | – | 0 | – | 1 | – | 3 | .250 |
| Akron | 0 | – | 0 | – | 1 | – | 4 | .200 |
| Central Michigan | 0 | – | 0 | – | 0 | – | 4 | .000 |
| Kent State | 0 | – | 0 | – | 0 | – | 4 | .000 |
| Eastern Michigan | 0 | – | 0 | – | 0 | – | 5 | .000 |
† 2027 MAC tournament winner As of November 19, 2026

The 2026–27 Ohio Bobcats women's basketball team will represent Ohio University during the 2026–27 NCAA Division I women's basketball season. The Bobcats, led by fourteenth-year head coach Bob Boldon, will play their home games at the Convocation Center in Athens, Ohio as a member of the Mid-American Conference.

== Previous season ==
Ohio finished the 2025–26 season 11–7 in MAC play, to finish in 5th place. They qualified for the MAC tournament as the 5th seed where they defeated Central Michigan in the quarterfinals before losing to top seeded Miami in the semifinals They lost in the first round of the WNIT.

== Offseason ==
=== Departures ===
Departures
| Name | Number | Pos. | Height | Year | Hometown | Reason |
|---|---|---|---|---|---|---|
| Aliah McWhorter | 4 | G | 6'1" | Gr. | Cincinnati, OH | Exhausted eligibility |
| Elli Garnett | 8 | F | 5'11" | Gr. | Lakewood, CO | Exhausted eligibility |
| Aja Austin | 24 | F | 6'1" | Sr. | Westerville, OH | Exhausted eligibility |

=== Incoming transfers ===
Incoming Transfers
| Name | Number | Pos. | Height | Year | Hometown | Reason |
|---|---|---|---|---|---|---|
| Irene Asensio Mañosa | 12 | G | 5'8" | Jr. | Barcelona, Spain | Transferred from UTEP |

=== 2026 recruiting class ===
Recruiting class
| Name | Number | Pos. | Height | High school | Hometown |
|---|---|---|---|---|---|
| Sienna Allen | 1 | G | 6'1" | Portsmouth | Portsmouth, OH |
| Kamie Ellis | 0 | G | 5'9" | Port Charlotte, FL | Miami Country Day |
| Blossom Wallace | 10 | F | 6'0" | Pickerington, OH | Pickerington Central |
| Aubrey Pepper | 8 | G | 5'9" | Athens, OH | Warren |

== Preseason ==
On October 20, 2026 the MAC released the preseason coaches poll. Ohio was picked to finish fifth in the MAC regular season. Ohio received zero first place votes and zero votes to win the MAC Tournament.

=== Preseason rankings ===
MAC preseason poll
| Predicted finish | Team | Votes (1st place) | 1st place |
|---|---|---|---|
| 1. | Ball State | 111 | 5 |
| 2. | Miami | 108 | 4 |
| 3. | UMass | 103 | 1 |
| 4. | Toledo | 98 | 2 |
| 5. | Ohio | 75 | -- |
| 6. | Eastern Michigan | 61 | -- |
| 7. | Kent State | 59 | -- |
| 8. | Bowling Green | 50 | -- |
| 9. | Central Michigan | 105 | -- |
| 10. | Western Michigan | 37 | -- |
| 11. | Akron | 27 | -- |
| 12. | Buffalo | 19 | -- |

MAC Tournament Champions: Ball State 4, Toledo 4, Miami 3, UMass 1

=== Preseason All-MAC ===
Preseason All-MAC teams
| Team | Player | Position | Year |
|---|---|---|---|
| 1st | Bailey Tabeling | G | Sr. |

== Roster ==
2026–27 Ohio Bobcats women's basketball team
Players
Coaches

| Pos. | # | Name | Height | Year | Previous school | Hometown |
|---|---|---|---|---|---|---|
| G | 0 | Kamie Ellis | 5 ft 9 in (1.75 m) | Fr | Miami Country Day | Port Charlotte, FL |
| G | 1 | Sienna Allen | 6 ft 1 in (1.85 m) | Fr | Portsmouth | Portsmouth, OH |
| G | 2 | ReRe Jennings | 5 ft 11 in (1.8 m) | So | Harker Heights | Killeen, TX |
| G | 3 | Bella Ranallo | 5 ft 6 in (1.68 m) | RS Jr | Lake Forest | Lake Forest, IL |
| G | 5 | Vivienne Macheck | 5 ft 10 in (1.78 m) | So | UNITED School of Sports | Embrach,Switzerland |
| G | 8 | Aubrey Pepper | 5 ft 9 in (1.75 m) | Fr | Warren | Athens, OH |
| F | 10 | Blosson Wallace | 6 ft 0 in (1.83 m) | Fr | Pickerington Central | Pickerington, OH |
| G | 11 | Antonicia Moultrie | 5 ft 9 in (1.75 m) | Sr | Saint Augustine's | Nassau, Bahamas |
| G | 12 | Irene Asensio Mañosa | 5 ft 8 in (1.73 m) | Jr | Sant Adria Femenil | Barcelona, Spain |
| G | 13 | Monica Williams | 5 ft 9 in (1.75 m) | RS Jr | Lawrence North | Indianapolis, IN |
| G | 20 | Gigi Bower | 5 ft 9 in (1.75 m) | Jr | Olentangy | Powell, OH |
| G | 21 | Bailey Tabeling | 5 ft 10 in (1.78 m) | Sr | Trinity Lutheran | Seymour, IN |
| G | 22 | Asiah Baxter | 5 ft 11 in (1.8 m) | Sr | Warren Central | Indianapolis, IN |
| F | 23 | Danni Scully | 6 ft 1 in (1.85 m) | Jr | Nazareth Academy | Park Ridge, IL |
| G | 30 | Madison Lim | 5 ft 10 in (1.78 m) | RS Jr | Mechanicsburg | Marysville, OH |
| F | 41 | Cassidy Lafler | 5 ft 11 in (1.8 m) | Sr | Dublin Coffman | Dublin, OH |

Head coach

- Bob Boldon (Walsh)

Assistant coach(es)

- Tavares Jackson (Minnesota)
- Chelsea Welch (Wright State)
- Kaylee Gregory Bambule (Ohio)
- Abby Garnett (Ohio)

Legend

- (C) Team captain
- (S) Suspended
- (I) Ineligible
- (W) Walk-on
- Injured
- Current redshirt

Roster
Last update: October 14, 2026

=== Support staff ===
2026–27 Ohio Bobcats support staff
- Ebony Pegues – Director of Basketball Operations
- Becca Gaddy – Director of Athletics Communications (Volleyball, Women's Basketball, Cross Country/Track & Field, Baseball)
- Brooke Bolduc – Assistant Strength and Conditioning Coach (Soccer, WBB)
- Morgan Hall – Staff Athletic Trainer
- Jessica Arquette – Ohio Athletics Sports Dietitian
- Kaitlyn Michener – Nutritionist
- Hannah Rastatter – Nutritionist

== Schedule and Results ==
| Date time, TV | Rank^{#} | Opponent^{#} | Result | Record | High points | High rebounds | High assists | Site (attendance) city, state |
Exhibition
| October 21, 2026*; 7:00 p.m. | | Denison | W 105–63 | – | – | – | – | Convocation Center; Athens, OH |
Regular season
| November 2, 2026*; 7:00 p.m., ESPN+ | | Louisiana–Monroe; MAC-SBC Challenge | W 57–46 | 1–0 | 19 – Williams | 8 – Ellis | 3 – Tied | Convocation Center (300); Athens, OH |
| November 9, 2026*; 11:00 a.m., ESPN+ | | Otterbein | W 66–44 | 2–0 | 13 – Scully | 10 – Jennings | 4 – Jennings | Convocation Center (4,232); Athens, OH |
| November 14, 2026*; 1:00 p.m., ESPN+ | | Georgia | L 55–75 | 2–1 | 18 – Tabeling | 7 – Moultrie | 3 – Tabeling | Convocation Center (435); Athens, OH |
| November 18, 2026*; 7:00 p.m., ESPN+ | | at Howard | W 76–74 | 3–1 | 19 – Tabeling | 6 – Tied | 4 – Tied | Burr Gymnasium (718); Washington, D.C. |
| November 21, 2026*; 1:00 p.m., ESPN+ | | Xavier | | | | | | Convocation Center; Athens, OH |
| November 30, 2026*; 6:00 p.m., ESPN+ | | at Marshall | | | | | | Cam Henderson Center; Huntington, WV |
| December 5, 2026*; 1:00 p.m., ESPN+ | | Radford | | | | | | Convocation Center; Athens, OH |
| December 14, 2026*; 11:00 a.m., ESPN+ | | at Southern Illinois | | | | | | Banterra Center; Carbondale, IL |
| December 16, 2026*; 8:00 p.m., ESPN+ | | at Saint Louis | | | | | | Banterra Center; Carbondale, IL |
| December 22, 2026*; 1:00 p.m., ESPN+ | | Davidson | | | | | | Convocation Center; Athens, OH |
| December 29, 2026*; 12:00 p.m., ESPN+ | | Ohio Wesleyan | | | | | | Convocation Center; Athens, OH |
MAC regular season
| January 2, 2027; 1:00 p.m., ESPN+ | | Bowling Green | | | | | | Convocation Center; Athens, OH |
| January 6, 2027; 7:00 p.m., ESPN+ | | at Western Michigan | | | | | | University Arena; Kalamazoo, MI |
| January 9, 2027; 1:00 p.m., ESPN+ | | at Eastern Michigan | | | | | | George Gervin GameAbove Center; Ypsilanti, MI |
| January 13, 2027; 7:00 p.m., ESPN+ | | Toledo | | | | | | Convocation Center; Athens, OH |
| January 16, 2027; 12:00 p.m., ESPN+ | | at Akron | | | | | | James A. Rhodes Arena; Akron, OH |
| January 20, 2027; 7:00 p.m., ESPN+ | | Buffalo | | | | | | Convocation Center; Athens, OH |
| January 23, 2027; 1:00 p.m., ESPN+ | | Miami (OH) | | | | | | Convocation Center; Athens, OH |
| January 27, 2027; 7:00 p.m., ESPN+ | | at Toledo | | | | | | Savage Arena; Toledo, OH |
| January 30, 2027; 1:00 p.m., ESPN+ | | UMass | | | | | | Convocation Center; Athens, OH |
| February 3, 2027; 7:00 p.m., ESPN+ | | at Kent State | | | | | | MAC Center; Kent, OH |
| February 6, 2027*; TBA, ESPN+ | | at TBA; MAC-SBC Challenge | | | | | | TBA; TBA |
| February 10, 2027; 7:00 p.m., ESPN+ | | Ball State | | | | | | Convocation Center; Athens, OH |
| February 13, 2027; 5:00 p.m., ESPN+ | | at Bowling Green | | | | | | Stroh Center; Bowling Green, OH |
| February 17, 2027; 6:30 p.m., ESPN+ | | at Central Michigan | | | | | | McGuirk Arena; Mount Pleasant, MI |
| February 20, 2027; 1:00 p.m., ESPN+ | | Eastern Michigan | | | | | | Convocation Center; Athens, OH |
| February 24, 2027; 6:00 p.m., ESPN+ | | at Buffalo | | | | | | Alumni Arena; Amherst, NY |
| February 27, 2027; 1:00 p.m., ESPN+ | | Western Michigan | | | | | | Convocation Center; Athens, OH |
| March 3, 2027; TBA, ESPN+ | | Akron | | | | | | Convocation Center; Athens, OH |
| March 6, 2027; TBA, ESPN+ | | Miami (OH) | | | | | | Millett Hall; Oxford, OH |
MAC Tournament
| March 13, 2026†; TBA, ESPN+ | | vs. TBA; Quarterfinals | | | | | | Rocket Arena; Cleveland, OH |
*Non-conference game. ^{#}Rankings from AP Poll. (#) Tournament seedings in parentheses. All times are in Eastern Time.

† If a top eight finisher in MAC Source
