= 2026–27 Mid-American Conference women's basketball season =

- League: NCAA Division I
- Sport: Basketball
- Teams: 12

Regular season

2027 MAC tournament

Tournament

Mid-American women's basketball seasons
- 2025–26 2027–28

2026–27 Mid-American Conference women's basketball standings
	Conf.				Overall
Team	W		L	PCT	W		L	PCT
Akron	0	–	0	–	0	–	0	–
Ball State	0	–	0	–	0	–	0	–
Bowling Green	0	–	0	–	0	–	0	–
Buffalo	0	–	0	–	0	–	0	–
Central Michigan	0	–	0	–	0	–	0	–
Eastern Michigan	0	–	0	–	0	–	0	–
Kent State	0	–	0	–	0	–	0	–
Miami (OH)	0	–	0	–	0	–	0	–
Ohio	0	–	0	–	0	–	0	–
Toledo	0	–	0	–	0	–	0	–
UMass	0	–	0	–	0	–	0	–
Western Michigan	0	–	0	–	0	–	0	–
† 2027 MAC tournament winner

The 2026–27 Mid-American Conference women's basketball season will be the season for Mid-American Conference women's basketball teams. It will begin with practices in October 2026, followed by the start of the 2026–27 NCAA Division I women's basketball season in November. Conference play will begin in December 2026 and conclude in March 2027. The 2027 MAC tournament will be held at Rocket Arena in Cleveland, Ohio for the 27th consecutive season. It will be the first MAC season without Northern Illinois since 1996–97.

== Head coaches ==
=== Coaching changes ===
==== Kent State ====
Head coach Todd Starkey accepted the associate head coach position at Arizona on March 26, 2026 after 10 years adn a 344–222 overall record. Associate head coach Fran Recchia was promoted to head coach.

=== Coaches ===
Team	Head coach	Previous job	Years at school	Overall record	School record	MAC record	MAC titles	MAC tournament titles	NCAA tournaments	NCAA Final Fours	NCAA championships
Akron	Ryan Gensler	Illinois (Asst.)	4	27–62 (.303)	27–62 (.303)	13–39 (.250)	0	0	0	0	0
Ball State	Brady Sallee	Eastern Illinois	15	427–272 (.611)	291–162 (.642)	174–78 (.690)	2	1	1	0	0
Bowling Green	Fred Chmiel	South Carolina (Asst.)	4	51–42 (.548)†	51–42 (.548)	30–24 (.556)	0	0	0	0	0
Buffalo	Kristen Sharkey	Syracuse (Assoc. HC)	2	3–27 (.100)	3–27 (.100)	1–17 (.056)	0	0	0	0	0
Central Michigan	Kristin Haynie	Michigan State (Asst.)	4	36–50 (.419)	36–50 (.419)	23–29 (.442)	0	0	0	0	0
Eastern Michigan	Sahar Nusseibeh	Canisius	3	46–103 (.309)	15–43 (.259)	7–29 (.194)	0	0	0	0	0
Kent State	Fran Recchia	Kent State (Assoc. HC)	1	0–0 (–)	0–0 (–)	0–0 (–)	0	0	0	0	0
Miami	Glenn Box	Indiana (Assoc HC.)	4	120–70 (.632)	56–39 (.589)	33–21 (.611)	1	1	1	0	0
Ohio	Bob Boldon	Youngstown State	14	318–264 (.546)	221–177 (.555)	129–104 (.554)	2	1	1	0	0
Toledo	Ginny Boggess	Monmouth	3	95–66 (.590)	41–23 (.641)	22–14 (.611)	0	0	0	0	0
UMass	Mike Leflar	UMass (Assoc. HC)	4	45–49 (.479)	45–49 (.479)	15–3 (.833)	0	0	0	0	0
Western Michigan	Kate Achter	Detroit Mercy	2	113–186 (.378)	9–20 (.310)	5–13 (.278)	0	0	0	0	0

Notes:

- Appearances, titles, etc. are from time with current school only.
- Years at school includes 2026–27 season.
- MAC records are from time at current school only.
- All statistics and records are through the beginning of the season.
- †Chmiel's overall record does not include his coaching record at Feather River College and Lassen College because it is unknown to the author.

== Preseason ==
The MAC Men's & Women's Basketball Tip-Off was held on Tuesday, October 20, 2026. Each team had their head coach and a student athlete from both the men's and women's basketball team for interviews.

MAC Women's Basketball Preview Coaches & Student-Athletes

- Akron: Head Coach Ryan Gensler & Macey Fegan (Senior Forward)
- Ball State: Head Coach Brady Sallee & Tessa Towers (Graduate Forward)
- Bowling Green: Head Coach Fred Chmiel & Lauren Gerken (Junior Forward)
- Buffalo: Head Coach Kristen Sharkey & Meg Lucas (Sophomore Forward)
- Central Michigan: Head Coach Kristin Haynie & ZIndya Davis (Junior Guard)
- Eastern Michigan: Head Coach Sahar Nusseibeh & Sisi Eleko (Senior, Forward)
- Kent State: Head Coach Fran Recchia & Emory Klatt (Junior Forward)
- Miami: Head Coach Glenn Box & Amber Tretter (Junior, Forward)
- Ohio: Head Coach Bob Boldon & Bailey Tabeling (Senior Guard)
- Toledo: Head Coach Ginny Boggess & Ella Weaver (Senior Guard)
- UMass: Head Coach Mike Leflar and Yahmani McKayle (Junior Guard)
- Western Michigan: Head Coach Kate Achter & Kailey Starks (Junior Guard)

=== Preseason women's basketball coaches poll ===
Women's Basketball Preseason Poll
Place	Team	Points	First place votes
1.	Ball State	111	5
2.	Miami	108	4
3.	UMass	103	1
4.	Toledo	98	2
5.	Ohio	75	--
6.	Eastern Michigan	61	--
7.	Kent State	59	--
8.	Bowling Green	50	--
9.	Central Michigan	105	--
10.	Western Michigan	37	--
11.	Akron	27	--
12.	Buffalo	19	--

MAC tournament champions: Ball State (4), Toledo (4), Miami (3), UMass (1)

=== MAC Preseason All-Conference ===
Honor	Recipient
Preseason All-MAC First Team	Janae Tyler, Kent State, Junior
Preseason All-MAC First Team	Kendall Carruthers, Toledo
Preseason All-MAC First Team	Bailey Tabeling, Ohio
Preseason All-MAC First Team	Tessa Towers, Ball State
Preseason All-MAC First Team	Amber Tretter, Miami
Preseason All-MAC Second Team	Faith Fedd-Robinson, Toledo
Preseason All-MAC Second Team	Peyton Hill, Eastern Michigan
Preseason All-MAC Second Team	Grace Kingery, Ball State
Preseason All-MAC Second Team	Julianna Lamendola, Miami
Preseason All-MAC Second Team	Jyah LoVett, Toledo
Preseason All-MAC Second Team	Aniya Rowe, Buffalo

== See also ==
- 2026–27 Mid-American Conference men's basketball season
