= Melissa Jackson =

American basketball player and coach

Current position
- Title: Head coach
- Team: Youngstown State
- Conference: Horizon League
- Record: 37–29 (.561)

Biographical details
- Born: Hazleton, Pennsylvania, U.S.

Playing career
- 2000–2004: Richmond

Coaching career (HC unless noted)
- 2004–2008: Delaware (asst.)
- 2008–2018: Akron (asst.)
- 2018–2023: Akron
- 2023–2024: Cleveland State (asst.)
- 2024–present: Youngstown State

Head coaching record
- Overall: 109–98 (.527)
- Tournaments: 1–2 (WNIT); 0–1 (WBI)

Melissa Jackson is the head coach of the Youngstown State Penguins women's basketball team. Previously, she was the head coach at the University of Akron and an assistant coach for Cleveland State.

== Career ==
She was an assistant to Akron head coach Jodi Kest for ten years before being promoted to head coach in June 2018. Prior to Akron she was an assistant coach at Delaware. She played basketball at Richmond. She led Akron to a 2022 Women's National Invitation Tournament appearance. During her fifth season, Akron announced on February 21, 2023, that Jackson's contract will not be renewed at the end of the season, ending her 5-year tenure. On August 8, 2023, she accepted an assistant position at Cleveland State under Chris Kielsmeier. On March 14, 2024, Jackson was named the new head coach of Youngstown State University.

== Personal life ==
Jackson was born in Hazleton, Pennsylvania. While at the University of Richmond she earned a bachelor's degree in political science in 2004. She and her husband Drew have two sons, Luke and Ben and a daughter Cameron.

== Head coaching record ==
Record table
| Season | Team | Overall | Conference | Standing | Postseason |
|---|---|---|---|---|---|
Akron (Mid-American Conference) (2018–2023)
| 2018–19 | Akron | 16–15 | 7–9 | 5th (East) | WBI First Found |
| 2019–20 | Akron | 15–15 | 8–10 | 4th (East) | |
| 2020–21 | Akron | 7–14 | 4–14 | 11th | |
| 2021–22 | Akron | 17–12 | 13–7 | 3rd | WNIT First Round |
| 2022–23 | Akron | 17–13 | 8–10 | T–5th | |
| Akron: | | 72–69 (.511) | 40–50 (.444) | | |
Youngstown State (Horizon League) (2024–present)
| 2024–25 | Youngstown State | 12–19 | 7–13 | T–8th | |
| 2025–26 | Youngstown State | 25–10 | 15–5 | 2nd | WNIT Super 16 |
| Youngstown State: | | 37–29 (.561) | 22–18 (.550) | | |
| Total: | | 109–98 (.527) | | | |
National champion Postseason invitational champion Conference regular season champion Conference regular season and conference tournament champion Division regular season champion Division regular season and conference tournament champion Conference tournament champion
