= 2027 MAC women's basketball tournament =

- Classification: Division I
- Season: 2026–27
- Teams: 8
- Site: Rocket Arena; Cleveland, Ohio
- MAC women's basketball tournaments

2026–27 Mid-American Conference women's basketball standings
| | Conf. | | | | Overall |
| Team | W | | L | PCT | W | | L | PCT |
|---|---|---|---|---|---|---|---|---|
| Akron | 0 | – | 0 | – | 0 | – | 0 | – |
| Ball State | 0 | – | 0 | – | 0 | – | 0 | – |
| Bowling Green | 0 | – | 0 | – | 0 | – | 0 | – |
| Buffalo | 0 | – | 0 | – | 0 | – | 0 | – |
| Central Michigan | 0 | – | 0 | – | 0 | – | 0 | – |
| Eastern Michigan | 0 | – | 0 | – | 0 | – | 0 | – |
| Kent State | 0 | – | 0 | – | 0 | – | 0 | – |
| Miami (OH) | 0 | – | 0 | – | 0 | – | 0 | – |
| Ohio | 0 | – | 0 | – | 0 | – | 0 | – |
| Toledo | 0 | – | 0 | – | 0 | – | 0 | – |
| UMass | 0 | – | 0 | – | 0 | – | 0 | – |
| Western Michigan | 0 | – | 0 | – | 0 | – | 0 | – |
† 2027 MAC tournament winner

The 2027 MAC women's basketball tournament will be postseason basketball tournament for the 2026–27 college basketball season in the Mid-American Conference (MAC). The entire tournament will be held at Rocket Arena, in Cleveland, Ohio on March 10 and 12–13, 2027.

== Format ==
As with all MAC tournaments since 2021, only the top eight teams will qualify. However, under a new format this year, the #1 and #2 seeds in both tournaments will receive byes into the semifinals, while the $3 and #4 seeds will receive byes into the quarterfinals. The winner of the tournament will receive the MAC's automatic bid to the 2027 NCAA tournament.

== Venue ==
The 2027 MAC tournament will be held at Rocket Arena for the 27th consecutive season. The venue is the home of the Cleveland Cavaliers of the NBA, has a capacity for basketball of 19,432, and is located in downtown Cleveland at One Center Court.

== Seeds ==
Eight out of the twelve MAC teams will qualify for the tournament. Teams will be seeded by record within the conference, with a tiebreaker system to seed teams with identical conference records.

| Seed | School | Conference record | Tiebreaker |
|---|---|---|---|
| 1 | | | |
| 2 | | | |
| 3 | | | |
| 4 | | | |
| 5 | | | |
| 6 | | | |
| 7 | | | |
| 8 | | | |
| DNQ | | | |
| DNQ | | | |
| DNQ | | | |
| DNQ | | | |

== Schedule ==
| Session | Game | Time* | Matchup | Score | Attendance | Television |
Quarterfinals – Wednesday, March 10 – Rocket Arena, Cleveland, OH
| 1 | 1 | 11:00 am | | | | |
| 1 | 2 | 30 mins after Game 1 | | | | |
| 1 | 3 | 30 mins after Game 2 | | | | |
| 1 | 4 | 30 mins after Game 3 | | | | |
Semifinals – Friday, March 12 – Rocket Arena, Cleveland, OH
| 2 | 5 | 10:00 am | | | | |
| 2 | 6 | 30 mins after Game 5 | | | | |
Championship – Saturday, March 13 – Rocket Arena, Cleveland, OH
| 3 | 7 | 11:00 am | | | | |
*Game times in EDT. ()-Rankings denote tournament seeding.

== Bracket ==
First Round; Wednesday, March 10, 2027
5
8
6
7

Quarterfinals; Thursday, March 11, 2027
4
3

Semifinals; Friday, March 12, 2027
1
2

Championship; Saturday, March 13, 2027

== See also ==
2027 MAC men's basketball tournament
