= 2025–26 Marshall Thundering Herd women's basketball team =

American college basketball season

2025–26 Marshall Thundering Herd women's basketball

WNIT Champions
- Conference: Sun Belt Conference
- Record: 28–9 (13–5 Sun Belt)
- Head coach: Juli Fulks (2nd season)
- Assistant coaches: Mykasa Lucas; Patrick Herlihy; Cassie Lastivka
- Home arena: Cam Henderson Center

2025–26 Sun Belt Conference women's basketball standings
	Conf.				Overall
Team	W		L	PCT	W		L	PCT
Georgia Southern	16	–	2	.889	23	–	8	.742
Troy	15	–	3	.833	25	–	8	.758
Arkansas State	14	–	4	.778	27	–	10	.730
James Madison †	14	–	4	.778	26	–	9	.743
Marshall	13	–	5	.722	27	–	9	.750
Old Dominion	9	–	9	.500	18	–	14	.563
Southern Miss	8	–	10	.444	15	–	16	.484
Texas State	7	–	11	.389	11	–	19	.367
Coastal Carolina	7	–	11	.389	14	–	18	.438
Louisiana–Monroe	7	–	11	.389	17	–	16	.515
Georgia State	5	–	13	.278	10	–	21	.323
South Alabama	5	–	13	.278	17	–	19	.472
Appalachian State	4	–	14	.222	11	–	19	.367
Louisiana	2	–	16	.111	5	–	26	.161
† 2026 Sun Belt tournament winner As of April 1, 2026

The 2025–26 Marshall Thundering Herd women's basketball team represented Marshall University during the 2025–26 NCAA Division I women's basketball season. The Thundering Herd, led by second-year head coach Juli Fulks, played their home games at Cam Henderson Center as members of the Sun Belt Conference. They finished the season 28–9, 13–5 in Sun Belt play to finish in fifth place. In the Sun Belt tournament, they lost to South Alabama in the fourth round. They were invited to the WNIT where they defeated UMBC, Youngstown State, Army, Arkansas State, and Illinois State to become WNIT champions.

== Previous season ==
The Thundering Herd finished the season 15–20, 6–12 in Sun Belt play to finish in tie for eleventh place. In the Sun Belt tournament, they defeated South Alabama, Texas State, Louisiana, and Appalachian State before losing to Troy in the quarterfinals.

== Offseason ==
=== Departures ===
Name	Number	Pos.	Height	Year	Hometown	Notes
Jayda Allie	11	G/F	5'8"	RS Freshman	Huntington, West Virginia	Transferred to Glenville State
Aislynn Hayes	10	G	5'8"	Senior	Murfreesboro, Tennessee	Graduated
Alasia Hayes	5	G	5'9"	RS Junior	Murfreesboro, Tennessee	Entered transfer portal
Maddie Kellione	6	G	5'6"	GS Senior	Cynthiana, Kentucky	Graduated
CC Mayes	3	G	5'8"	Junior	Tampa, Florida	Transferred to Tulane
Adiana Pacheco	4	F	6'1"	Junior	Harrison, New Jersey	Entered transfer portal
Ashley Tudor	22	G	5'11"	Senior	Cincinnati, Ohio	Graduated
Olivia Ziolkowski	14	F	6'0"	Junior	Beckley, West Virginia	Transferred to Concord

=== Incoming transfers ===
Name	Number	Pos.	Height	Year	Hometown	Previous School
Emily Bratton	22	G	5'7"	Sophomore	Carroll, Ohio	Miami (OH)
Ni'Kiah Chesterfield	15	F	6'0"	Junior	Murfreesboro, Tennessee	Tusculum
Emari Doby	21	F	5'10"	Junior	Topeka, Kansas	UIS
Timaya Lewis-Eutsey	3	G	5'8"	Senior	Trenton, New Jersey	VCU

=== 2025 recruiting class ===
College recruiting information
Name	Hometown	School	Height	Weight	Commit date
Olivia Olson; SF	New Smyrna Beach, Florida	New Smyrna Beach High School	5 ft 10 in (1.78 m)	N/A	Nov 14, 2024
Olivia Olson; SF	Recruit ratings: (NR)				
Zenthia Stowers; SF	Auckland, New Zealand	Westlake Girls High School	6 ft 0 in (1.83 m)	N/A	Feb 1, 2025
Zenthia Stowers; SF	Recruit ratings: (NR)				
Overall recruit ranking: Rivals: NR ESPN: NR
Note: In many cases, Scout, Rivals, 247Sports, On3, and ESPN may conflict in their listings of height and weight.; In these cases, the average was taken. ESPN grades are on a 100-point scale.; Sources: "2025 Team Ranking". Rivals.

== Preseason ==
On October 20, 2025, the Sun Belt Conference released their preseason coaches poll. Marshall was picked to finish eighth in the Sun Belt regular season.

=== Preseason rankings ===
Sun Belt preseason poll
Predicted finish	Team	Votes (1st place)
1	James Madison	189 (9)
2	Arkansas State	174 (3)
3	Troy	171 (1)
4	Old Dominion	151 (1)
5	Southern Miss	125
6	Coastal Carolina	104
7	Georgia State	102
8	Marshall	100
9	Appalachian State	94
10	Georgia Southern	73
11	Louisiana	67
12	Texas State	55
13	Louisiana–Monroe	36
14	South Alabama	29

== Roster ==
2025–26 Marshall Thundering Herd women's basketball team
Players
Coaches

Pos.	#	Name	Height	Year	Previous school	Hometown
G/F	0	Timberlynn Yeast	5 ft 9 in (1.75 m)	RS So	Mercer County	Harrodsburg, Kentucky
F	1	TreShondra Williams	6 ft 2 in (1.88 m)	Sr	Columbia State	Flint, Michigan
G	2	Blessing King	5 ft 10 in (1.78 m)	Sr	Morehead State	Columbus, Ohio
G	3	Timaya Lewis-Eutsey	5 ft 8 in (1.73 m)	Sr	VCU	Trenton, New Jersey
F	4	Zenthia Stowers	6 ft 0 in (1.83 m)	Fr	Westlake Girls	Auckland, New Zealand
G	5	Olivia Olson	5 ft 10 in (1.78 m)	Fr	New Smyrna Beach	New Smyrna Beach, Florida
F	13	Leyocha Marigney	6 ft 3 in (1.91 m)	Jr	Reedley	Fresno, California
G	15	Ni'Kiah Chesterfield	6 ft 0 in (1.83 m)	Jr	Tusculum	Murfreesboro, Tennessee
G	20	Peyton Ilderton	5 ft 6 in (1.68 m)	Sr	Logan	Logan, West Virginia
G	21	Emari Doby	5 ft 10 in (1.78 m)	Jr	UIS	Topeka, Kansas
G	22	Emily Bratton	5 ft 7 in (1.7 m)	So	Miami (OH)	Carroll, Ohio
F	23	Meredith Maier	6 ft 0 in (1.83 m)	Sr	Fairmont Senior	Fairmont, West Virginia
G	24	Kassie Ingram	5 ft 11 in (1.8 m)	So	Kings	Cincinnati, Ohio
G/F	30	Aarionna Redman	5 ft 10 in (1.78 m)	GS	Pickerington Central	Pickerington, Ohio

Head coach

- Juli Fulks (Capital)

Assistant coach(es)

- Mykasa Lucas (Louisville)
- Patrick Herlihy (Syracuse)
- Cassie Lastivka (Ohio Northern)

Legend

- (C) Team captain
- (S) Suspended
- (I) Ineligible
- (W) Walk-on
- Injured
- Current redshirt

Roster
Last update: 11/7/2025

== Schedule and results ==
Date time, TV	Rank^{#}	Opponent^{#}	Result	Record	High points	High rebounds	High assists	Site (attendance) city, state
Exhibition
October 25, 2025*; 1:00 p.m.		UPike	W 84–52		–	–	–	Cam Henderson Center; Huntington, WV
Regular season
November 3, 2025*; 6:00 p.m., ESPN+		Buffalo; MAC-SBC Challenge	W 53–39	1–0	14 – Olson	11 – King	3 – Yeast	Cam Henderson Center (980); Huntington, WV
November 6, 2025*; 6:00 p.m., ESPN+		Northern Kentucky	W 68–53	2–0	19 – Lewis-Eutsey	10 – King	3 – Lewis-Eutsey	Cam Henderson Center (1,046); Huntington, WV
November 11, 2025*; 7:00 p.m., B1G+		at Indiana	L 51–57	2–1	11 – Olson	6 – Yeast	4 – Ilderton	Simon Skjodt Assembly Hall (7,518); Bloomington, IN
November 15, 2025*; 1:00 p.m., ESPN+		No. 23 Kentucky	L 44–76	2–2	9 – Tied	5 – Tied	2 – Ilderton	Cam Henderson Center (3,040); Huntington, WV
November 18, 2025*; 6:00 p.m., ESPN+		Salem	W 105–31	3–2	17 – Lewis-Eutsey	9 – Yeast	5 – Yeast	Cam Henderson Center (998); Huntington, WV
November 21, 2025*; 12:00 p.m.		vs. USC Upstate	W 85–54	4–2	17 – Lewis-Eutsey	8 – Williams	6 – Lewis-Eutsey	Ellis Johnson Arena (106); Morehead, KY
November 23, 2025*; 4:00 p.m., ESPN+		IU Indy	W 81–70	5–2	18 – Lewis-Eutsey	8 – Olson	5 – Lewis-Eutsey	Cam Henderson Center (1,216); Huntington, WV
November 30, 2025*; 2:00 p.m., ESPN+		at Morehead State	L 56–66	5–3	12 – Olson	8 – Tied	3 – Ilderton	Ellis Johnson Arena (225); Morehead, KY
December 3, 2025*; 6:00 p.m., ESPN+		at Coppin State	W 75–53	6–3	19 – Lewis-Eutsey	7 – King	5 – Lewis-Eutsey	Physical Education Complex (242); Baltimore, MD
December 6, 2025*; 1:00 p.m., ESPN+		Kent State	W 70–62	7–3	16 – Lewis-Eutsey	9 – Olson	3 – Tied	Cam Henderson Center (1,067); Huntington, WV
December 11, 2025*; 6:00 p.m., ESPN+		Davis & Elkins	W 105–40	8–3	18 – Lewis-Eutsey	13 – King	6 – Ilderton	Cam Henderson Center (1,006); Huntington, WV
December 14, 2025*; 3:00 p.m., ESPN+		vs. Eastern Kentucky	W 75–50	9–3	26 – Lewis-Eutsey	10 – King	3 – Tied	Clive M. Beck Center (417); Lexington, KY
December 17, 2025; 11:00 a.m., ESPN+		Appalachian State	W 75–62	10–3 (1–0)	31 – Lewis-Eutsey	6 – Marigney	3 – Tied	Cam Henderson Center (3,767); Huntington, WV
December 20, 2025; 1:00 p.m., ESPN+		James Madison	W 83–74 ^{OT}	11–3 (2–0)	26 – Olson	6 – Marigney	7 – Lewis-Eutsey	Cam Henderson Center (994); Huntington, WV
January 1, 2026; 4:20 p.m., ESPN+		at Coastal Carolina	W 87–85 ^{OT}	12–3 (3–0)	19 – Olson	8 – Tied	9 – Lewis-Eutsey	HTC Center (602); Conway, SC
January 3, 2026; 2:00 p.m., ESPN+		at Appalachian State	W 53–48	13–3 (4–0)	13 – Tied	5 – Lewis-Eutsey	3 – Olson	Holmes Center (573); Boone, NC
January 7, 2026; 6:00 p.m., ESPN+		Old Dominion	W 77–70	14–3 (5–0)	33 – Lewis-Eutsey	6 – Tied	5 – Ilderton	Cam Henderson Center (1,003); Huntington, WV
January 10, 2026; 1:00 p.m., ESPN+		Coastal Carolina	W 80–74	15–3 (6–0)	20 – Ilderton	7 – Maier	7 – Lewis-Eutsey	Cam Henderson Center (1,591); Huntington, WV
January 15, 2026; 6:00 p.m., ESPN+		at James Madison	L 43–80	15–4 (6–1)	8 – Lewis-Eutsey	7 – Yeast	3 – Lewis-Eutsey	Atlantic Union Bank Center (1,929); Harrisonburg, VA
January 17, 2026; 2:00 p.m., ESPN+		at Old Dominion	L 82–84 ^{OT}	15–5 (6–2)	31 – Lewis-Eutsey	6 – Maier	6 – Lewis-Eutsey	Chartway Arena (2,495); Norfolk, VA
January 22, 2026; 6:00 p.m., ESPN+		at Southern Miss	W 61–52	16–5 (7–2)	14 – Maier	9 – King	3 – Lewis-Eutsey	Reed Green Coliseum (1,343); Hattiesburg, MS
January 23, 2026; 3:00 p.m., ESPN+		at Louisiana–Monroe	W 82–75	17–5 (8–2)	25 – Lewis-Eutsey	7 – Maier	6 – Lewis-Eutsey	Fant–Ewing Coliseum (1,021); Monroe, LA
January 28, 2026; 6:00 p.m., ESPN+		Troy	L 82–85	17–6 (8–3)	33 – Lewis-Eutsey	7 – Lewis-Eutsey	10 – Lewis-Eutsey	Cam Henderson Center (1,510); Huntington, WV
January 31, 2026; 1:00 p.m., ESPN+		Louisiana	W 95–54	18–6 (9–3)	24 – Lewis-Eutsey	7 – Tied	5 – Tied	Cam Henderson Center (1,538); Huntington, WV
February 4, 2026; 8:00 p.m., ESPN+		at South Alabama	W 69–60	19–6 (10–3)	17 – Tied	13 – Chesterfield	6 – Lewis-Eutsey	Mitchell Center (393); Mobile, AL
February 7, 2026*; 1:00 p.m., ESPN+		at Central Michigan; MAC-SBC Challenge	W 88–81	20–6	36 – Lewis-Eutsey	6 – Tied	4 – Tied	McGuirk Arena (1,306); Mount Pleasant, MI
February 12, 2026; 6:00 p.m., ESPN+		Georgia State	W 71–56	21–6 (11–3)	19 – Lewis-Eutsey	8 – Lewis-Eutsey	4 – Yeast	Cam Henderson Center (997); Huntington, WV
February 14, 2026; 1:00 p.m., ESPN+		Arkansas State	W 62–54	22–6 (12–3)	19 – Lewis-Eutsey	15 – Marigney	4 – Lewis-Eutsey	Cam Henderson Center (1,576); Huntington, WV
February 19, 2026; 6:00 p.m., ESPN+		at Georgia Southern	L 55–76	22–7 (12–4)	21 – Lewis-Eutsey	6 – Yeast	4 – Lewis-Eutsey	Hill Convocation Center (1,009); Statesboro, GA
February 21, 2026; 1:00 p.m., ESPN+		at Georgia State	W 82–75	23–7 (13–4)	32 – Lewis-Eutsey	9 – King	3 – Ilderton	GSU Convocation Center (1,176); Atlanta, GA
February 27, 2026; 6:00 p.m., ESPN+		Georgia Southern	L 72–78	23–8 (13–5)	22 – Lewis-Eutsey	11 – King	4 – Lewis-Eutsey	Cam Henderson Center (2,543); Huntington, WV
Sun Belt Conference Tournament
March 6, 2026; 12:30 p.m., ESPN+	(5)	vs. (12) South Alabama; Fourth round	L 58–73	23–9	18 – Lewis-Eutsey	6 – Lewis-Eutsey	3 – Lewis-Eutsey	Pensacola Bay Center (406); Pensacola, FL
WNIT
March 23, 2026*; 6:00 p.m., ESPN+		UMBC; Second round	W 66–53	24–9	21 – Lewis-Eutsey	7 – King	6 – Lewis-Eutsey	Cam Henderson Center (1,416); Huntington, WV
March 27, 2026*; 6:30 p.m., ESPN+		at Youngstown State; Super 16	W 72–46	25–9	20 – Lewis-Eutsey	7 – Tied	4 – Lewis-Eutsey	Beeghly Center (1,791); Youngstown, OH
March 30, 2026*; 6:00 p.m., ESPN+		Army; Great 8	W 82–65	26–9	23 – Lewis-Eutsey	8 – Maier	4 – Ilderton	Cam Henderson Center (2,212); Huntington, WV
April 1, 2026*; 8:00 p.m., ESPN+		at Arkansas State; Fab 4	W 69–62	27–9	31 – Lewis-Eutsey	10 – King	4 – Lewis-Eutsey	First National Bank Arena (2,683); Jonesboro, AR
April 4, 2026*; 3:00 p.m., ESPN+		Illinois State; Championship	W 66–41	28–9	27 – Lewis-Eutsey	8 – King	3 – Tied	Cam Henderson Center (5,475); Huntington, WV
*Non-conference game. ^{#}Rankings from AP Poll. (#) Tournament seedings in parentheses. All times are in Eastern Time.
