= 2026–27 Miami RedHawks women's basketball team =

American college basketball season

2026–27 Miami RedHawks women's basketball
- Conference: Mid-American Conference
- Record: 5–0 (0–0 MAC)
- Head coach: Glenn Box (4th season)
- Associate head coach: JR Shumate
- Assistant coaches: Maya Chandler; Simeon Spurling; Rebecca Harris
- Home arena: Millett Hall

2026–27 Mid-American Conference women's basketball standings
	Conf.				Overall
Team	W		L	PCT	W		L	PCT
Miami (OH)	0	–	0	–	5	–	0	1.000
Bowling Green	0	–	0	–	3	–	0	1.000
Ohio	0	–	0	–	2	–	1	.667
Buffalo	0	–	0	–	2	–	2	.500
Toledo	0	–	0	–	2	–	2	.500
UMass	0	–	0	–	2	–	2	.500
Ball State	0	–	0	–	1	–	2	.333
Western Michigan	0	–	0	–	1	–	2	.333
Akron	0	–	0	–	1	–	3	.250
Central Michigan	0	–	0	–	0	–	3	.000
Kent State	0	–	0	–	0	–	3	.000
Eastern Michigan	0	–	0	–	0	–	4	.000
† 2027 MAC tournament winner As of November 16, 2026

The 2026–27 Miami RedHawks women's basketball team represent Miami University during the 2026–27 NCAA Division I women's basketball season. The RedHawks, led by fourth-year head coach Glenn Box, play their home games at Millett Hall in Oxford, Ohio as members of the Mid-American Conference (MAC).

== Previous Season ==
The team finished 28–7 overall and 16–2 in MAC play, to finish sharing first place with Ball State. Miami defeated Kent State, Ohio and Toledo to win the 2026 MAC women's basketball tournament title. Miami received the MAC autobid for the 2026 NCAA tournament, being ranked 13th, and losing to the West Virginia Mountaineers in the first round.

== Achievements ==
On November 11th, 2026, Miami defeated Oakland 66-49 to start the season 5-0, for the first time in program history.

== Off season ==
=== Departures ===
Departures
Name	Number	Pos.	Height	Year	Hometown	Reason
Clara Gonzalez Planella	7	G	5 ft 8 in (1.73 m)	Sr.	Barcelona, Spain	Graduated
Macie Taylor	10	G	5 ft 7 in (1.70 m)	RS Jr.	Troy, Ohio	Transferred to Cleveland State
Anna Hurst	11	G	5 ft 8 in (1.73 m)	Fr.	Silver Lake, Ohio	
Tamar Singer	13	G	5 ft 4 in (1.63 m)	So.	Haifa, Israel	Transferred to Butler
Ilse de Vries	21	F	6 ft 3 in (1.91 m)	So.	Groningen, Netherlands	Transferred to Stanford
Ashton Elley	22	G	5 ft 10 in (1.78 m)	Sr.	Little Rock, Arkansas	Graduated
Emily VanTimmeren	23	F	6 ft 3 in (1.91 m)	RS Fr.	Allendale, Michigan	Transferred to Western Michigan
Mio Sakano	30	G	5 ft 10 in (1.78 m)	Jr.	Yamanashi, Japan	Transferred to FIU

=== Incoming transfers ===
Incoming transfers
Name	Number	Pos.	Height	Year	Previous school
Jaya McClure	0	G	5 ft 6 in (1.68 m)	Sr.	UIC / Ohio
Julianna LaMendola	3	F	6 ft 1 in (1.85 m)	Sr.	Indiana / Grand Canyon
Audrey Biggs	23	G	6 ft 0 in (1.83 m)	Jr.	Pittsburgh
Lucía Martínez López	24	G/F	6 ft 1 in (1.85 m)	Jr.	Xavier
Addison Baxter	33	G	5 ft 9 in (1.75 m)	So.	Butler
Jade Ondineme	45	F	6 ft 3 in (1.91 m)	Sr.	Indiana / Northwest Florida State

=== 2026 recruiting class ===
2026 recruiting class
Name	Number	Pos.	Height	Year	Hometown
Brooke Zartman	2	G	5 ft 8 in (1.73 m)	Fr.	Warsaw, Indiana
Laia Jové	8	G	5 ft 7 in (1.70 m)	Fr.	Barcelona, Spain
Dominika Ullmann	9	G	5 ft 7 in (1.70 m)	Fr.	Gdańsk, Poland
Adela Plans Bellavista	18	G	5 ft 10 in (1.78 m)	Fr.	Barcelona, Spain

== Preseason ==
On October 20, 2026 the MAC released the preseason coaches poll. Miami was picked to finish second in the MAC regular season. Miami received four first place votes and three votes to win the MAC Tournament.

=== Preseason rankings ===
MAC preseason poll
Predicted finish	Team	Votes (1st place)	1st place
1.	Ball State	111	5
2.	Miami	108	4
3.	UMass	103	1
4.	Toledo	98	2
5.	Ohio	75	--
6.	Eastern Michigan	61	--
7.	Kent State	59	--
8.	Bowling Green	50	--
9.	Central Michigan	105	--
10.	Western Michigan	37	--
11.	Akron	27	--
12.	Buffalo	19	--

MAC Tournament Champions: Ball State 4, Toledo 4, Miami 3, UMass 1

=== Preseason All-MAC ===
Preseason All-MAC teams
Team	Player	Position	Year
1st	Amber Tretter	F	Sr.
2nd	Julianna Lamendola	F	Sr.

== Roster ==
2026–27 Miami RedHawks women's basketball team
Players
Coaches

Pos.	#	Name	Height	Year	Previous school	Hometown
G	0	Jaya McClure	5 ft 6 in (1.68 m)	Sr	Christian Academy of Louisville	Louisville, Kentucky
G	1	Amber Scalia	5 ft 0 in (1.52 m)	Sr	Stillwater Area High School	Stillwater, Minnesota
G	2	Brooke Zartman	5 ft 8 in (1.73 m)	Fr	Warsaw Community High School	Warsaw, Indiana
F	3	Julianna LaMendola	6 ft 1 in (1.85 m)	Sr	Coppell High School	Coppell, Texas
G	8	Laia Jové	5 ft 7 in (1.7 m)	Fr	Escola Vedruna Gràcia	Barcelona, Spain
G	9	Dominika Ullmann	5 ft 7 in (1.7 m)	Fr	Szkola Mistrzostwa	Gdańsk, Poland
F	15	Amber Tretter	6 ft 1 in (1.85 m)	Sr	Forest Park High School	Ferdinand, Indiana
G	17	Núria Jurjo	5 ft 10 in (1.78 m)	Sr	Institut Montserrat Roig	Barcelona, Spain
G	18	Adela Plans Bellavista	5 ft 10 in (1.78 m)	Fr	Institut Joaquim Blume	Barcelona, Spain
G	23	Audrey Biggs	6 ft 0 in (1.83 m)	Jr	Boyd County High School	Catlettsburg, Kentucky
G/F	24	Lucía Martínez López	6 ft 1 in (1.85 m)	Jr	Colegio Internacional San Fernando	Oviedo, Spain
G	33	Addison Baxter	5 ft 9 in (1.75 m)	So	Columbia City High School	Larwill, Indiana
F	41	Brooke Blumenfeld	6 ft 0 in (1.83 m)		Glenbrook North High School	Northbrook, Illinois
F	45	Jade Ondineme	6 ft 3 in (1.91 m)	Sr	Toulouse Metropole Basket	Orléans, France

Head coach

- Glenn Box (Southeast Missouri State)

Assistant coach(es)

- JR Shumate (Otterbein)
- Maya Chandler (SMU)
- Simeon Spurling (Southern New Hampshire)
- Rebecca Harris (Illinois)

Legend

- (C) Team captain
- (S) Suspended
- (I) Ineligible
- (W) Walk-on
- Injured
- Current redshirt

Roster
Last update: November 5, 2026

== Schedule and results ==
Date time, TV	Rank^{#}	Opponent^{#}	Result	Record	High points	High rebounds	High assists	Site (attendance) city, state
Non-conference regular season
November 2, 2026*; 7 p.m., ESPN+		James Madison; MAC-SBC Challenge	W 59–52	1–0	24 – LaMendola	9 – LaMendola	4 – Jurjo	Millett Hall (472); Oxford, Ohio
November 5, 2026*; 12 p.m., ESPN+		at Southeast Missouri State	W 75–52	2–0	18 – Scalia	11 – Tretter	6 – LaMendola	Show Me Center (2,865); Cape Girardeau, Missouri
November 8, 2026*; 1 p.m.		Bellarmine	W 92–37	3–0	19 – Zartman	8 – Martínez López	7 – Baxter	Millett Hall (379); Oxford, Ohio
November 11, 2026*; 10:30 a.m., ESPN+		Mount Vernon Nazarene	W 106–45	4–0	16 – Tretter	8 – Jurjo	7 – LaMendola	Millett Hall (1,711); Oxford, Ohio
November 15, 2026*; 1 p.m., ESPN+		Oakland	W 66–49	5–0	24 – Tretter	14 – Tretter	8 – Baxter	Millett Hall (462); Oxford, Ohio
November 20, 2026*; 6 p.m., ESPN+		at Southern Indiana						Libery Arena; Evansville, Indiana
November 26, 2026*; 9 p.m., Flo Sports		vs. Cincinnati; Riviera Tournament (Cancun Challenge)						Hard Rock Hotel Riviera Maya; Riviera Maya, Mexico
November 27, 2026*; 6:30 p.m., Flo Sports		vs. Kansas; Riviera Tournament (Cancun Challenge)						Hard Rock Hotel Riviera Maya; Riviera Maya, Mexico
Conference regular season
January 2, 2027; 2 p.m., ESPN+		at Buffalo						Broadview Arena; Buffalo, New York
January 6, 2027; 7 p.m., ESPN+		Toledo						Millett Hall; Oxford, Ohio
January 9, 2027; 11 a.m., ESPN+		at Ball State						Worthen Arena; Muncie, Indiana
January 13, 2027; 7 p.m., ESPN+		Massachusetts						Millett Hall; Oxford, Ohio
January 16, 2027; 1 p.m., ESPN+		Central Michigan						Millett Hall; Oxford, Ohio
January 20, 2027; TBA, ESPN+		at Toledo						Savage Arena; Toledo, Ohio
January 23, 2027; 1 p.m., ESPN+		at Ohio						Convocation Center; Athens, Ohio
January 27, 2027; 7 p.m., ESPN+		Western Michigan						Millett Hall; Oxford, Ohio
January 31, 2027; 4 p.m., CBS Sports Network		Ball State						Millett Hall; Oxford, Ohio
February 3, 2027; 6:30 p.m., ESPN+		at Central Michigan						McGuirk Arena; Mount Pleasant, Michigan
February 6, 2027; TBA		at TBA; MAC-SBC Challenge						TBA; TBA
February 10, 2027; 7 p.m., ESPN+		Kent State						Millett Hall; Oxford, Ohio
February 13, 2027; 2 p.m., ESPN+		at Eastern Michigan						George Gervin GameAbove Center; Ypsilanti, Michigan
February 17, 2027; 7 p.m., ESPN+		Bowling Green						Millett Hall; Oxford, Ohio
February 20, 2027; 4 p.m., ESPN+		at Akron						James A. Rhodes Arena; Akron, Ohio
February 24, 2027; 6 p.m., ESPN+		at Massachusetts						Mullins Center; Amherst, Massachusetts
February 27, 2027; 1 p.m., ESPN+		Buffalo						Millett Hall; Oxford, Ohio
March 3, 2027; 7 p.m., ESPN+		at Western Michigan						University Arena; Kalamazoo, Michigan
March 6, 2027; 1 p.m., ESPN+		Ohio						Millett Hall; Oxford, Ohio
*Non-conference game. ^{#}Rankings from AP poll. (#) Tournament seedings in parentheses. All times are in Eastern.

== Rankings ==
Ranking movements Legend: — = Not ranked
	Week																				
Poll	Pre	1	2	3	4	5	6	7	8	9	10	11	12	13	14	15	16	17	18	19	Final
AP	—	—																			
Coaches	—	—																			

== See also ==
2026–27 Miami RedHawks men's basketball team
