= Jodi Kest =

American basketball coach

Biographical details
- Born: March 30, 1962 (age 64)
- Education: Slippery Rock (B.Sc., 1984); Northwest Missouri State (M.Sc., 1986)

Playing career

Basketball:
- 1980–1984: Slippery Rock

Tennis:
- 1980–1984: Slippery Rock

Coaching career (HC unless noted)
- 1986–1990: Wilkes
- 1990–1992: Maine (assistant)
- 1992–1993: Cleveland State (assistant)
- 1993–1995: Nevada (assistant)
- 1995–1996: Cal Poly (assistant)
- 1996–2002: Gannon
- 2002–2006: Texas A&M–Corpus Christi
- 2006–2018: Akron
- 2018–2019: Lynn (assistant)
- 2019–2020: High Point (assistant)

Jodi Kest (born March 30, 1962) is the former head women's basketball coach for the University of Akron. Slippery Rock football

== Coaching career ==
Kest started her coaching career as a graduate assistant at Northwest Missouri State from 1984 until 1986.

In her first season at Akron, the Zips posted double digit wins for the first time in more than eight years. That included a six-game winning streak, which was the longest in several years. Prior to coaching at Akron, she coached at Texas A&M University–Corpus Christi. She posted a 73–40 (.646) record there, and was named Independent Coach of the Year in 2003, 2004, and 2005. She announced her resignation from Akron on April 21, 2018 after 12 years at the school.

In the 2004 season, the Islanders went 23–7, setting school records for wins, and winning percentage. She also served as the head women's basketball coach at Gannon University in Pennsylvania for six seasons. She has a career record of 236–172 (.578) as a college head coach. She has also served as an assistant coach at the University of Maine, Cleveland State University, and the University of Nevada, Reno.

She graduated from Mayfield High School and Slippery Rock University.

== Coaching Record ==
Record table
Season	Team	Overall	Conference	Standing	Postseason
Texas A&M–Corpus Christi (Independent) (2003–2005)
2003–04	Texas A&M–Corpus Christi	19–9			
2004–05	Texas A&M–Corpus Christi	23–7			
2005–06	Texas A&M–Corpus Christi	16–12			
Texas A&M–Corpus Christi:		58–28 (.674)			
University of Akron (Mid-American Conference) (2006–2018)
2006–07	Akron	10–19	3–13	T-11th	
2007–08	Akron	7–24	2–14	12th	
2008–09	Akron	11–19	6–10	9th	
2009–10	Akron	18–14	11–5	5th	WBI First round
2010–11	Akron	14–16	6–10	7th	
2011–12	Akron	14–18	7–9	6th	
2012–13	Akron	23–10	12–4	3rd	WNIT First round
2013–14	Akron	23–10	14–4	3rd	NCAA First round
2014–15	Akron	22–9	12–6	2nd (East)	WNIT First round
2015–16	Akron	19–14	11–7	2nd (East)	WNIT First round
2016–17	Akron	9–21	2–16	6th (East)	
2017–18	Akron	9–21	3–15	6th (East)	
Akron:		179–195 (.479)	89–113 (.441)		
Total:					
National champion Postseason invitational champion Conference regular season champion Conference regular season and conference tournament champion Division regular season champion Division regular season and conference tournament champion Conference tournament champion
