= 2025–26 Youngstown State Penguins women's basketball team =

American college basketball season

2025–26 Youngstown State Penguins women's basketball

WNIT, Super 16
- Conference: Horizon League
- Record: 25–10 (15–5 Horizon)
- Head coach: Melissa Jackson (2nd season)
- Assistant coaches: Courtney Davidson; Kayla DeCriscio; Shayna Gore
- Home arena: Beeghly Center

2025–26 Horizon League women's basketball standings
| | Conf. | | | | Overall |
| Team | W | | L | PCT | W | | L | PCT |
|---|---|---|---|---|---|---|---|---|
| Green Bay † | 17 | – | 3 | .850 | 25 | – | 9 | .735 |
| Youngstown State | 15 | – | 5 | .750 | 25 | – | 10 | .714 |
| Cleveland State | 13 | – | 7 | .650 | 26 | – | 10 | .722 |
| Northern Kentucky | 12 | – | 8 | .600 | 15 | – | 17 | .469 |
| Purdue Fort Wayne | 12 | – | 8 | .600 | 21 | – | 14 | .600 |
| Robert Morris | 11 | – | 9 | .550 | 18 | – | 12 | .600 |
| IU Indy | 9 | – | 11 | .450 | 14 | – | 17 | .452 |
| Oakland | 7 | – | 13 | .350 | 10 | – | 21 | .323 |
| Wright State | 6 | – | 14 | .300 | 10 | – | 22 | .313 |
| Milwaukee | 4 | – | 16 | .200 | 8 | – | 24 | .250 |
| Detroit Mercy | 4 | – | 16 | .200 | 7 | – | 24 | .226 |
† 2026 Horizon League tournament winner

The 2025–26 Youngstown State Penguins women's basketball team represented Youngstown State University during the 2025–26 NCAA Division I women's basketball season. The Penguins, led by second-year head coach Melissa Jackson, played their home games at the Beeghly Center in Youngstown, Ohio as members of the Horizon League. They finished the season 25–10, 15–5 in Horizon League play, to finish in second place. They defeated Wright State and Cleveland State in the Horizon League tournament before falling to first-seeded Green Bay in the championship game. In the WNIT, the Penguins beat Maryland Eastern Shore in the second round before losing to Marshall in the Super 16.

== Previous season ==
The Penguins finished the 2024–25 season 12–19, 7–13 in Horizon League play, to finish in a tie for eighth place. They were defeated by Wright State in the first round of the Horizon League tournament.

== Offseason ==
=== Departures ===
Youngstown State departures
| Name | Number | Pos. | Height | Year | Hometown | Reason for departure |
|---|---|---|---|---|---|---|
| Xoe Rosalez | 1 | G | 5' 6" | Junior | Seminole, TX | Transferred to Texas Tech, non-basketball reasons |
| Malia Magestro | 2 | G | 5' 9" | Graduate student | Hermitage, PA | Exhausted eligibility |
| Jewel Watkins | 10 | G | 5' 11" | Senior | Columbus, OH | Graduated; Signed with UCC Glanmire |
| Abby Liber | 11 | G/F | 6' 0" | Junior | Avon, OH | Left program |
| Haley Thierry | 23 | G | 5' 8" | Senior | Willoughby Hills, OH | Graduated |

=== Incoming transfers ===
Youngstown State incoming transfers
| Name | Number | Pos. | Height | Year | Hometown | Previous school |
|---|---|---|---|---|---|---|
| Paulina Hernandez | 7 | F | 6' 2" | Junior | Oak Creek, WI | Cleveland State |
| Casey Santoro | 14 | G | 5' 4" | RS Senior | Bellevue, OH | Florida Gulf Coast |

=== 2025 recruiting class ===
College recruiting
| Name | Hometown | School | Height | Weight | Commit date |
|---|---|---|---|---|---|
| Brooke Adkins; G | Wayne, WV | Wayne High School | 6 ft 0 in (1.83 m) | N/A | Nov 13, 2024 |
| Brooke Adkins; G | Recruit ratings: No ratings found | | | | |
Overall recruit ranking:
Note: In many cases, Scout, Rivals, 247Sports, On3, and ESPN may conflict in their listings of height and weight.; In these cases, the average was taken. ESPN grades are on a 100-point scale.; Sources: "2025 Team Ranking". Rivals.

== Preseason ==
On October 9, 2025, the Horizon League released their preseason poll and league teams. Youngstown State was picked to finish third in the conference, while receiving one first-place vote. One player was named to the preseason All-Horizon League First Team.

=== Preseason rankings ===
Horizon League Preseason Coaches Poll
| Place | Team | Votes |
|---|---|---|
| 1 | Green Bay | 117 (8) |
| 2 | Robert Morris | 97 (1) |
| 3 | Youngstown State | 92 (1) |
| 4 | Cleveland State | 87 (1) |
| 5 | Purdue Fort Wayne | 79 |
| 6 | Northern Kentucky | 70 |
| 7 | Detroit Mercy | 59 |
| 8 | Wright State | 47 |
| 9 | Milwaukee | 29 |
| 10 | IU Indy | 27 |
| 11 | Oakland | 22 |
(#) first-place votes

=== Preseason All-Horizon League Teams ===
Preseason All-Horizon League Teams
| Team | Player | Position | Year |
|---|---|---|---|
| First | Sophia Gregory | Forward | Sophomore |

== Roster ==
2025–26 Youngstown State Penguins women's basketball team
Players
Coaches

| Pos. | # | Name | Height | Year | Previous school | Hometown |
|---|---|---|---|---|---|---|
| G | 2 | Danielle Cameron | 5 ft 9 in (1.75 m) | RS Fr | Olmsted Falls High School | Olmsted Falls, OH |
| G | 4 | Erica King | 5 ft 7 in (1.7 m) | So | St. Vincent–St. Mary High School | Akron, OH |
| G | 5 | Hayden Barrier | 5 ft 7 in (1.7 m) | So | Montgomery County High School | Mount Sterling, KY |
| F | 7 | Paulina Hernandez | 6 ft 2 in (1.88 m) | Jr | Cleveland State | Oak Creek, WI |
| G | 12 | Dacia Lewandowski | 5 ft 11 in (1.8 m) | So | Akron | Butler, PA |
| G | 14 | Casey Santoro (6Y) | 5 ft 4 in (1.63 m) | RS Sr | Florida Gulf Coast | Bellevue, OH |
| G | 20 | Brooke Adkins | 6 ft 0 in (1.83 m) | Fr | Wayne High School | Wayne, WV |
| F | 21 | Sophia Gregory | 6 ft 2 in (1.88 m) | So | West Branch High School | Alliance, OH |
| G | 24 | Bella Samz | 5 ft 8 in (1.73 m) | Jr | Arrowhead High School | Oconomowoc, WI |
| F | 44 | Ashlynn Van Tassell | 6 ft 3 in (1.91 m) | RS Fr | Cameron High School | Cameron, WV |
| F | 50 | Sarah Baker | 6 ft 2 in (1.88 m) | RS Fr | Ryle High School | Florence, KY |

Head coach

- Melissa Jackson (Richmond)

Assistant coach(es)

- Courtney Davidson (Michigan State)
- Kayla DeCriscio (Pitt–Johnstown)
- Shayna Gore (Marshall)

Legend

- (C) Team captain
- (S) Suspended
- (I) Ineligible
- (W) Walk-on
- (6Y) Sixth-year senior
- Injured
- Current redshirt

Roster
Last update: March 27, 2026

== Schedule and results ==
| Date time, TV | Rank^{#} | Opponent^{#} | Result | Record | High points | High rebounds | High assists | Site (attendance) city, state |
Regular season
| November 3, 2025*; 11:00 a.m., ESPN+ | | Thiel | W 104–33 | 1–0 | 14 – 2 tied | 14 – Burch | 6 – Gregory | Beeghly Center (3,101); Youngstown, OH |
| November 7, 2025*; 8:00 p.m., Midco Sports Plus | | at North Dakota | W 65–58 | 2–0 | 16 – Baker | 10 – Gregory | 15 – Santoro | Betty Engelstad Sioux Center (1,497); Grand Forks, ND |
| November 12, 2025*; 6:30 p.m., B1G+ | | at No. 24 Michigan State | L 52–96 | 2–1 | 10 – 2 tied | 6 – Gregory | 2 – King | Breslin Center (2,542); East Lansing, MI |
| November 16, 2025*; 2:00 p.m., ESPN+ | | Bucknell | W 60–53 | 3–1 | 14 – King | 10 – Gregory | 14 – Santoro | Beeghly Center (1,293); Youngstown, OH |
| November 20, 2025*; 6:00 p.m., NEC Front Row | | at Mercyhurst | W 64–50 | 4–1 | 21 – Santoro | 6 – King | 5 – Baker | Mercyhurst Athletic Center (332); Erie, PA |
| November 25, 2025*; 6:30 p.m., ESPN+ | | Toledo | L 65–69 | 4–2 | 16 – Gregory | 8 – Gregory | 4 – King | Beeghly Center (1,342); Youngstown, OH |
| November 30, 2025*; 12:00 p.m., ESPN+ | | at Akron | W 90–63 | 5–2 | 24 – Gregory | 10 – 2 tied | 5 – King | James A. Rhodes Arena (954); Akron, OH |
| December 5, 2025; 7:00 p.m., ESPN+ | | at Milwaukee | W 68–56 | 6–2 (1–0) | 14 – 2 tied | 8 – Cameron | 5 – Gregory | Klotsche Center (435); Milwaukee, WI |
| December 7, 2025; 12:30 p.m., ESPN+ | | at Green Bay | L 47–56 | 6–3 (1–1) | 17 – Santoro | 7 – 2 tied | 3 – Santoro | Kress Events Center (1,610); Green Bay, WI |
| December 16, 2025; 6:30 p.m., ESPN+ | | Wright State | W 65–46 | 7–3 (2–1) | 18 – Cameron | 8 – 2 tied | 4 – Santoro | Beeghly Center (1,153); Youngstown, OH |
| December 19, 2025*; 11:00 a.m., ESPN+ | | at FIU; FIU Christmas Classic | L 61–78 | 7–4 | 15 – King | 6 – 2 tied | 9 – Santoro | Ocean Bank Convocation Center (126); Miami, FL |
| December 20, 2025*; 1:30 p.m., ESPN+ | | vs. UMass; FIU Christmas Classic | W 72–69 | 8–4 | 17 – Baker | 14 – Gregory | 6 – Gregory | Ocean Bank Convocation Center (82); Miami, FL |
| December 29, 2025; 4:00 p.m., ESPN+ | | at Cleveland State | W 70–63 | 9–4 (3–1) | 18 – 2 tied | 9 – Gregory | 7 – King | Wolstein Center (404); Cleveland, OH |
| December 31, 2025*; 1:00 p.m., ESPN+ | | Salem | W 97–20 | 10–4 | 18 – Barrier | 7 – Lewandowski | 6 – 2 tied | Beeghly Center (1,292); Youngstown, OH |
| January 5, 2026; 6:30 p.m., ESPN+ | | Oakland | W 81–58 | 11–4 (4–1) | 23 – King | 9 – Hernandez | 6 – Santoro | Beeghly Center (1,141); Youngstown, OH |
| January 8, 2026; 7:17 p.m., ESPN+ | | Northern Kentucky | L 49–61 | 11–5 (4–2) | 12 – Baker | 7 – 2 tied | 4 – Santoro | Beeghly Center (1,400); Youngstown, OH |
| January 10, 2026; 2:00 p.m., ESPN+ | | Purdue Fort Wayne | W 58−54 | 12−5 (5−2) | 18 – Santoro | 12 – Gregory | 4 – 2 tied | Beeghly Center (1,294); Youngstown, OH |
| January 14, 2026; 7:00 p.m., ESPN+ | | at Wright State | W 78–67 ^{OT} | 13–5 (6–2) | 25 – Baker | 11 – Baker | 3 – 3 tied | Nutter Center (1,085); Fairborn, OH |
| January 17, 2026; 2:00 p.m., ESPN+ | | IU Indy | L 52–61 | 13–7 (6–3) | 16 – Cameron | 7 – Cameron | 3 – 3 tied | Beeghly Center (1,271); Youngstown, OH |
| January 21, 2026; 6:00 p.m., ESPN+ | | at Robert Morris | L 40–55 | 13–7 (6–4) | 19 – Santoro | 8 – Gregory | 2 – 2 tied | UPMC Events Center (873); Moon Township, PA |
| January 25, 2026; 6:00 pm, ESPN+ | | Cleveland State | W 61–38 | 14–7 (7–4) | 17 – Cameron | 10 – Gregory | 6 – Gregory | Beeghly Center (30); Youngstown, OH |
| January 29, 2026; 7:00 p.m., ESPN+ | | at Detroit Mercy | W 69–53 | 15–7 (8–4) | 19 – Cameron | 8 – Gregory | 4 – Gregory | Calihan Hall (315); Detroit, MI |
| January 31, 2026; 2:00 p.m., ESPN+ | | at Oakland | W 72–60 | 16–7 (9–4) | 15 – Gregory | 8 – Santoro | 6 – Santoro | OU Credit Union O'rena; Rochester, MI |
| February 5, 2026; 6:30 p.m., ESPN+ | | Milwaukee | W 79–48 | 17–7 (10–4) | 17 – 2 tied | 14 – Gregory | 6 – Gregory | Beeghly Center (1,318); Youngstown, OH |
| February 7, 2026; 2:00 p.m., ESPN+ | | Green Bay | L 51–54 | 17–8 (10–5) | 18 – Baker | 7 – Baker | 5 – Santoro | Beeghly Center (1,937); Youngstown, OH |
| February 11, 2026; 6:30 p.m., ESPN+ | | Robert Morris | W 69–62 ^{OT} | 18–8 (11–5) | 21 – Baker | 16 – Gregory | 3 – Santoro | Beeghly Center (1,509); Youngstown, OH |
| February 15, 2026; 1:00 p.m., ESPN+ | | at IU Indy | W 69–65 | 19–8 (12–5) | 17 – Santoro | 7 – Hernandez | 6 – Gregory | The Jungle (375); Indianapolis, IN |
| February 19, 2026; 6:00 p.m., ESPN+ | | at Northern Kentucky | W 75–55 | 20–8 (13–5) | 18 – Santoro | 17 – Gregory | 6 – King | Truist Arena (1,263); Highland Heights, KY |
| February 21, 2026; 2:00 p.m., ESPN+ | | at Purdue Fort Wayne | W 76–71 | 21–8 (14–5) | 37 – Gregory | 19 – Gregory | 7 – Baker | Gates Sports Center (683); Fort Wayne, IN |
| February 25, 2026; 6:30 p.m., ESPN+ | | Detroit Mercy | W 72–60 | 22–8 (15–5) | 20 – Gregory | 12 – Gregory | 5 – Santoro | Beeghly Center (1,426); Youngstown, OH |
Horizon League tournament
| March 4, 2026; 7:00 p.m., ESPN+ | (2) | (9) Wright State; First round | W 76–60 | 23–8 | 19 – King | 7 – Hernandez | 6 – 2 tied | Beeghly Center (2,007); Youngstown, OH |
| March 9, 2026; 2:30 p.m., ESPN+ | (2) | vs. (3) Cleveland State; Semifinals | W 60–55 | 24–8 | 16 – Cameron | 9 – Gregory | 6 – Santoro | Corteva Coliseum; Indianapolis, IN |
| March 10, 2026; 12:00 p.m., ESPN2 | (2) | vs. (1) Green Bay; Championship | L 49–57 | 24–9 | 12 – Hernandez | 9 – Santoro | 4 – King | Corteva Coliseum; Indianapolis, IN |
WNIT
| March 24, 2026*; 6:30 p.m., ESPN+ | | Maryland Eastern Shore; Second round | W 61–42 | 25–9 | 13 – Gregory | 7 – Cameron | 6 – King | Beeghly Center (1,775); Youngstown, OH |
| March 27, 2026*; 6:30 p.m., ESPN+ | | Marshall; Super 16 | L 46–72 | 25–10 | 14 – Baker | 9 – Gregory | 3 – Baker | Beeghly Center (1,791); Youngstown, OH |
*Non-conference game. ^{#}Rankings from AP poll. (#) Tournament seedings in parentheses. All times are in Eastern.
