= 2025–26 South Alabama Jaguars women's basketball team =

Intercollegiate basketball season

2025–26 South Alabama Jaguars women's basketball

WNIT, Super 16
- Conference: Sun Belt Conference
- Record: 17–19 (5–13 Sun Belt)
- Head coach: Yolisha Jackson (3rd season)
- Assistant coaches: Eryc Pittman; Colby Davis; Brandon Jaijairam
- Home arena: Mitchell Center

2025–26 Sun Belt Conference women's basketball standings
	Conf.				Overall
Team	W		L	PCT	W		L	PCT
Georgia Southern	16	–	2	.889	23	–	8	.742
Troy	15	–	3	.833	25	–	8	.758
Arkansas State	14	–	4	.778	27	–	10	.730
James Madison †	14	–	4	.778	26	–	9	.743
Marshall	13	–	5	.722	28	–	9	.757
Old Dominion	9	–	9	.500	18	–	14	.563
Southern Miss	8	–	10	.444	15	–	16	.484
Texas State	7	–	11	.389	11	–	19	.367
Coastal Carolina	7	–	11	.389	14	–	18	.438
Louisiana–Monroe	7	–	11	.389	17	–	16	.515
Georgia State	5	–	13	.278	10	–	21	.323
South Alabama	5	–	13	.278	17	–	19	.472
Appalachian State	4	–	14	.222	11	–	19	.367
Louisiana	2	–	16	.111	5	–	26	.161
† 2026 Sun Belt tournament winner

The 2025–26 South Alabama Jaguars women's basketball team represented the University of South Alabama during the 2025–26 NCAA Division I women's basketball season. The team, led by third-year head coach Yolisha Jackson, played all home games at the Mitchell Center in Mobile, Alabama along with the South Alabama Jaguars men's basketball team. They were members of the Sun Belt Conference.

== Previous season ==
The Jaguars finished the 2024–25 season with a record of 6–24 overall and 2–16 in conference play. They lost to Marshall in the first round of their conference tournament. They did not advance to postseason play.

== Preseason ==
On October 20, 2025, the Sun Belt Conference released their preseason coaches poll. South Alabama was picked to finish last in the Sun Belt regular season.

=== Preseason rankings ===
Sun Belt preseason poll
Predicted finish	Team	Votes (1st place)
1	James Madison	189 (9)
2	Arkansas State	174 (3)
3	Troy	171 (1)
4	Old Dominion	151 (1)
5	Southern Miss	125
6	Coastal Carolina	104
7	Georgia State	102
8	Marshall	100
9	Appalachian State	94
10	Georgia Southern	73
11	Louisiana	67
12	Texas State	55
13	Louisiana–Monroe	36
14	South Alabama	29

== Offseason ==
=== Departures ===
Name	Number	Pos.	Height	Year	Hometown	Notes
Tara Green	2	C	6' 3"	Senior	West Helena, AR	Graduated
Naomi Smitherman	3	F	6' 1"	Junior	Birmingham, AL	Transferred to Little Rock
Michiyah Simmons	4	G	5' 6"	Junior	Pompano Beach, FL	Transferred to Florida Atlantic
Amyria Walker	5	G	5' 4"	Junior	Burleson, TX	Transferred to Texas State
Janelle Jones	10	G	5' 9"	Graduate	Pensacola, FL	Graduated
Nadia Howard	11	G	5' 9"	Senior	Grayson, GA	Graduated
Rachel Leggett	22	G	5' 8"	Junior	Navarre, FL	Transferred to Troy
Jordan Rosier	24	G	5' 9"	Senior	Tallahassee, FL	Transferred to UAB

=== Incoming ===
Name	Number	Pos.	Height	Year	Hometown	Notes
Ronaltha Marc	3	G	5' 10"	RS-Senior	Miami, FL	Transferred from Winthrop
Amyah Sutton	11	G	5' 9"	Junior	Oklahoma City, OK	Transferred from New Mexico JC
Cordasia Harris	22	F	6' 1"	Graduate	Hayneville, AL	Transferred from Alabama State
Tamara Ortiz	24	G	5' 4"	Sophomore	Columbus, OH	Transferred from Central Michigan
Diawna Carter-Hartley	25	F	6' 1"	Junior	Cincinnati, OH	Transferred from Stetson

=== Recruiting ===
College recruiting
Name	Hometown	School	Height	Weight	Commit date
Miyah Holmes; Guard	Carrollton, GA	Carrollton HS	N/A	N/A	
Miyah Holmes; Guard	Recruit ratings: No ratings found				
Chloe Donnell; Guard	Boerne, TX	Boerne HS	N/A	N/A	
Chloe Donnell; Guard	Recruit ratings: No ratings found				
Jeriyah Baines; Forward	St. Louis, MO	Legion Prep Academy	N/A	N/A	
Jeriyah Baines; Forward	Recruit ratings: No ratings found				
Overall recruit ranking:
Note: In many cases, Scout, Rivals, 247Sports, On3, and ESPN may conflict in their listings of height and weight.; In these cases, the average was taken. ESPN grades are on a 100-point scale.; Sources: "South Alabama 2025-26 Basketball Commits". ESPN.; "2025-26 Team Ranking". Rivals.com.

== Roster ==
2025–26 South Alabama Jaguars women's basketball team
Players
Coaches

Pos.	#	Name	Height	Year	Previous school	Hometown
G	0	Chrysta Narcisse	5 ft 8 in (1.73 m)	RS So	Lafayette HS	Lafayette, LA
G	1	Miyah Holmes	—	Fr	Carrollton HS	Carrollton, GA
G	3	Ronaltha Marc	5 ft 10 in (1.78 m)	Sr	Miami Norland Senior HS; Winthrop	Miami, FL
G	4	Chloe Donnell	—	Fr	Boerne HS	Boerne, TX
G	7	Aroa Mangas	5 ft 9 in (1.75 m)	So	IES La Laboral	Salamanca, Spain
G	8	Terren Coffil	5 ft 7 in (1.7 m)	So	Chalmette HS	New Orleans, LA
G	11	Amyah Sutton	5 ft 9 in (1.75 m)	Jr	Classen School of Advanced Studies; New Mexico JC	Oklahoma City, OK
F	15	Princess Okafor Nweze	6 ft 1 in (1.85 m)	So	IES Mar Alboran	Málaga, Spain
F	20	Daniela Gonzalez	6 ft 0 in (1.83 m)	Sr	Nativos Valle; South Florida	Jamundí, Colombia
C	21	Alicia Spann	6 ft 3 in (1.91 m)	Sr	Sumter HS; Daytona State College	Sumter, SC
F	22	Cordasia Harris	6 ft 1 in (1.85 m)	GS	Central HS; Alabama State	Hayneville, AL
G	23	Saneea Bevley	5 ft 7 in (1.7 m)	RS Jr	Blue Springs HS; McLennan Community College	Kansas City, MO
G	24	Tamara Ortiz	5 ft 4 in (1.63 m)	So	Westerville South HS; Central Michigan	Columbus, OH
F	25	Diawna Carter-Hartley	6 ft 1 in (1.85 m)	Jr	Princeton HS; Stetson	Cincinnati, OH
F	30	Jeriyah Baines	—	Fr	Legion Prep Academy	St. Louis, MO

Head coach

- Yolisha Jackson (Jacksonville)

Assistant coach(es)

- Eryc Pittman (Hampton)
- Colby Davis (South Alabama)
- Brandon Jaijairam (South Florida)

Legend

- (C) Team captain
- (S) Suspended
- (I) Ineligible
- (W) Walk-on
- Injured
- Current redshirt

Roster
Last update: 6 October 2025

== Schedule and results ==
Date time, TV	Rank^{#}	Opponent^{#}	Result	Record	High points	High rebounds	High assists	Site city, state
Exhibition
October 29, 2025*; 7:00 p.m.		Agnes Scott						Mitchell Center; Mobile, AL
Regular season
November 3, 2025*; 7:00 p.m., ESPN+		Akron; MAC–SBC Challenge	W 87–63	1–0	17 – Harris	13 – Harris	5 – Sutton	Mitchell Center (310); Mobile, AL
November 8, 2025*; 2:00 p.m., ESPN+		at UAB	W 91–68	2–0	19 – Sutton	6 – 2 tied	7 – Gonzalez	Bartow Arena (315); Birmingham, AL
November 11, 2025*; 7:00 p.m., ESPN+		Memphis	L 68–76	2–1	14 – Harris	9 – Harris	3 – 3 tied	Mitchell Center (439); Mobile, AL
November 14, 2025*; 11:00 a.m., ESPN+		North Florida	W 83–46	3–1	11 – 2 tied	10 – Carter-Hartley	6 – Narcisse	Mitchell Center (2,529); Mobile, AL
November 20, 2025*; 7:00 p.m., ESPN+		Florida Atlantic	W 70–63	4–1	14 – Sutton	6 – 2 tied	2 – 3 tied	Mitchell Center (379); Mobile, AL
November 25, 2025*; 5:00 p.m., ESPN+		Kennesaw State	W 66–54	5–1	14 – Gonzalez	9 – Harris	4 – Narcisse	Mitchell Center (380); Mobile, AL
November 30, 2025*; 1:00 p.m., ESPN+		Florida A&M	W 75–54	6–1	15 – Sutton	6 – 3 tied	6 – Narcisse	Mitchell Center (366); Mobile, AL
December 4, 2025*; 6:30 p.m., ESPN+		at Louisiana Tech	L 80–82	6–2	23 – Sutton	10 – Harris	3 – 5 tied	Thomas Assembly Center (1,374); Ruston, LA
December 7, 2025*; 1:00 p.m., SECN+		at Florida	L 61–75	6–3	12 – 2 tied	12 – Harris	6 – Narcisse	O'Connell Center (1,300); Gainesville, FL
December 14, 2025*; 2:00 p.m., ESPN+		North Alabama	W 70–58	7–3	20 – Harris	10 – Harris	3 – Sutton	Mitchell Center; Mobile, AL
December 18, 2025; 5:00 p.m., ESPN+		at Southern Miss	L 65–84	7–4 (0–1)	15 – Harris	11 – Harris	5 – Gonzalez	Reed Green Coliseum; Hattiesburg, MS
December 20, 2025; 2:00 p.m., ESPN+		at Arkansas State	L 61–74	7–5 (0–2)	22 – Harris	12 – Harris	4 – Carter-Hartley	First National Bank Arena (1,086); Jonesboro, AR
January 1, 2026; 1:30 p.m., ESPN+		at Louisiana–Monroe	L 44–61	7–6 (0–3)	12 – 2 tied	6 – 3 tied	3 – Mangas	Fant–Ewing Coliseum; Monroe, LA
January 3, 2026; 3:00 p.m., ESPN+		at Louisiana	W 81–56	8–6 (1–3)	22 – Harris	13 – Harris	4 – Narcisse	Cajundome (557); Lafayette, LA
January 8, 2026; 7:00 p.m., ESPN+		Arkansas State						Mitchell Center; Mobile, AL
January 10, 2026; 3:30 p.m., ESPN+		Louisiana–Monroe						Mitchell Center; Mobile, AL
January 17, 2026; 12:00 p.m., ESPN+		at Coastal Carolina						HTC Center; Conway, SC
January 22, 2026; 7:00 p.m., ESPN+		Georgia State						Mitchell Center; Mobile, AL
January 24, 2026; 2:00 p.m., ESPN+		Georgia Southern						Mitchell Center; Mobile, AL
January 29, 2026; 5:30 p.m., ESPN+		at Appalachian State						Holmes Center; Boone, NC
January 31, 2026; 1:00 p.m., ESPN+		at James Madison						Atlantic Union Bank Center; Harrisonburg, VA
February 4, 2026; 7:00 p.m., ESPN+		Marshall						Mitchell Center; Mobile, AL
February 7, 2026*		vs. TBA; MAC–SBC Challenge						Cleveland, OH
February 12, 2026; 7:00 p.m., ESPN+		Texas State						Mitchell Center; Mobile, AL
February 14, 2026; 2:00 p.m., ESPN+		Louisiana						Mitchell Center; Mobile, AL
February 18, 2026; 6:00 p.m., ESPN+		at Troy						Trojan Arena; Troy, AL
February 21, 2026; 2:00 p.m., ESPN+		at Texas State						Strahan Arena; San Marcos, TX
February 25, 2026; 5:00 p.m., ESPN+		Southern Miss						Mitchell Center; Mobile, AL
February 27, 2026; 5:00 p.m., ESPN+		Troy						Mitchell Center; Mobile, AL
Sun Belt tournament
March 3–9, 2026		vs.						Pensacola Bay Center; Pensacola, FL
*Non-conference game. ^{#}Rankings from AP poll. (#) Tournament seedings in parentheses. All times are in Central.

== See also ==
- 2025–26 South Alabama Jaguars men's basketball team
