= Akron Zips women's basketball =

Women's basketball team of the University of Akron

2026–27 Akron Zips women's basketball team
- University: University of Akron
- Athletic director: Andrew Goodrich
- Head coach: Ryan Gensler (4th season)
- Location: Akron, Ohio
- Arena: James A. Rhodes Arena (capacity: 5,500)
- Conference: Mid-American
- Nickname: Zips
- Colors: Blue and gold

NCAA Division I tournament appearances
- 2014

Conference tournament champions
- 2014

Uniforms
Home	Away

The Akron Zips women's basketball team represents the University of Akron in women's basketball. The school competes in the Mid-American Conference in Division I of the National Collegiate Athletic Association (NCAA). The Zips play home basketball games at the James A. Rhodes Arena in Akron, Ohio.

== Season-by-season record ==
As of the 2015–16 season, the Zips are 434–713 in 42 years of play. They have won one MAC title, in 2014 (after finishing as runner up the previous year), which is also their only appearance in the NCAA Tournament. As a 13 seed, they lost to #5 Purdue 84–55. They have reached the Women's National Invitation Tournament (WNIT) in 1999, 2013, 2015 along an appearance in the Women's Basketball Invitational in 2010.

Season	Coach	Record	Conference Record
1974–75	Mary Ann Tripodi	10–4	n/a
1975–76	Mary Ann Tripodi	10–6	n/a
1976–77	Mary Ann Tripodi	2–11	n/a
1977–78	Mary Ann Tripodi	5–12	n/a
1978–79	Mary Ann Tripodi	6–20	n/a
1979–80	Mary Ann Tripodi	15–13	n/a
1980–81	Mary Ann Tripodi	17–14	n/a
1981–82	Darlene Young	11–18	n/a
1982–83	John Street	13–13	n/a
1983–84	John Street	5–21	1–13 (OVC)
1984–85	John Street	9–18	1–13 (OVC)
1985–86	John Street	12–15	6–8 (OVC)
1986–87	John Street	14–13	7–7 (OVC)
1987–88	John Street	12–15	n/a
1988–89	John Street	14–15	6–8 (NSC)
1989–90	Lisa Fitch	10–17	4–8 (NSC)
1990–91	Lisa Fitch	3–25	2–12 (NSC)
1991–92	Lisa Fitch	6–22	3–9 NSC)
1992–93	Lisa Fitch	4–22	1–17 (MAC)
1993–94	Mary Ann Grimes	5–21	3–15 (MAC)
1994–95	Mary Ann Grimes	9–18	5–13 (MAC)
1995–96	Mary Ann Grimes	13–13	7–11 (MAC)
1996–97	Mary Ann Grimes (1–3); Angel Donley (4–18)	5–21	2–16 (MAC)
1997–98	Roxanne Allen	12–18	8–10 (MAC)
1998–99	Roxanne Allen	16–13	10–6 (MAC)
1999–2000	Roxanne Allen	11–17	7–9 (MAC)
2000–01	Roxanne Allen	6–23	3–13 (MAC)
2001–02	Roxanne Allen	1–27	0–16 (MAC)
2002–03	Kelly Kennedy	2–26	1–15 (MAC)
2003–04	Kelly Kennedy	7–21	2–14 (MAC)
2004–05	Kelly Kennedy	3–25	3–13 (MAC)
2005–06	Kelly Kennedy	5–23	2–14 (MAC)
2006–07	Jodi Kest	10–19	3–13 (MAC)
2007–08	Jodi Kest	7–24	2–14 (MAC)
2008–09	Jodi Kest	11–19	6–10 (MAC)
2009–10	Jodi Kest	18–14	11–5 (MAC)
2010–11	Jodi Kest	14–16	6–10 (MAC)
2011–12	Jodi Kest	14–18	7–9 (MAC)
2012–13	Jodi Kest	23–10	12–4 (MAC)
2013–14	Jodi Kest	23–10	14–4 (MAC)
2014–15	Jodi Kest	22–9	12–6 (MAC)
2015–16	Jodi Kest	19–14	11–7 (MAC)
2016–17	Jodi Kest	9–21	2–16 (MAC)
2017–18	Jodi Kest	9–21	3–15 (MAC)
2018–19	Melissa Jackson	16–15	17–11 (MAC)
2019–20	Melissa Jackson	15–15	8–10 (MAC)
2020–21	Melissa Jackson	7–14	4–14 (MAC)
2021–22	Melissa Jackson	17–12	13–7 (MAC)
2022–23	Melissa Jackson	17–13	8–10 (MAC)
2024-25	Ryan Gensler	10-21	4-14 (MAC)

== Postseason appearances ==
=== NCAA Division I Tournament appearances ===
Year	Seed	Round	Opponent	Result
2014	#13	First Round	#4 Purdue	L 84–55
