= List of Miami RedHawks women's basketball head coaches =

The following is a list of Miami RedHawks women's basketball head coaches. There have been 10 head coaches of the RedHawks since the 1974-75 season.

Miami's current head coach is Glenn Box in his fourth season. Box was hired in May of 2023.

No.	Tenure	Coach	Years	Record	Pct.
1	1974–1975	Elaine Hieber	1	8–9	.471
2	1975–1981	Pam Wettig	9	131–103	.560
3	1984–1988	Susan DeKalb	4	54–56	.491
4	1988–1993	Linda Wunder	5	88–52	.629
5	1995–1998	Lisa Bradley	5	80–50	.615
-	1998 (Note: Randy Roberts finished out the 1997-98 season as the interim head coach (10 games))	Randy Roberts	1	5–5	.500
6	1998–2013	Maria Fantanarosa	15	237–212	.528
7	2013–2017	Cleve Wright	4	35–87	.287
8	2017–2019	Megan Duffy	2	44–20	.688
9	2019–2023	DeUnna Hendrix	4	35–80	.304
10	2023–2026	Glenn Box	3	56–39	.589
Totals		10 coaches	52 seasons	773–713	.520
Records updated through end of 2025–26 season Source
