= 2025–26 Mid-American Conference women's basketball season =

- League: NCAA Division I
- Sport: Basketball
- Teams: 13

Regular season
- Champions: Miami, Ball State
- Season MVP: Madi Morson

2026 MAC tournament
- champions: Miami
- runners-up: Toledo
- 2026 MAC tournament MVP: Amber Scalia

Tournament

Mid-American women's basketball seasons
- 2024–25 2026–27

2025–26 Mid-American Conference women's basketball standings
	Conf.				Overall
Team	W		L	PCT	W		L	PCT
Miami (OH) †	16	–	2	.889	28	–	7	.800
Ball State	16	–	2	.889	26	–	7	.788
UMass	15	–	3	.833	23	–	7	.767
Central Michigan	12	–	6	.667	18	–	12	.600
Ohio	11	–	7	.611	18	–	14	.563
Toledo	9	–	9	.500	17	–	15	.531
Bowling Green	9	–	9	.500	17	–	14	.548
Kent State	9	–	9	.500	15	–	16	.484
Eastern Michigan	6	–	12	.333	13	–	16	.448
Western Michigan	5	–	13	.278	9	–	20	.310
Akron	4	–	14	.222	7	–	24	.226
Northern Illinois	4	–	14	.222	7	–	23	.233
Buffalo	1	–	17	.056	3	–	27	.100
† 2026 MAC tournament winner

The 2025–26 Mid-American Conference women's basketball season was the season for Mid-American Conference women's basketball teams. It began with practices in October 2025, followed by the start of the 2025–26 NCAA Division I women's basketball season in November. Conference play will began in December 2025 and concluded in March 2026. The 2026 MAC tournament was at Rocket Arena in Cleveland, Ohio for the 26th consecutive season. This season marks the conference's first change in membership since 2005 with the addition of UMass. It will also be the last MAC season for Northern Illinois, which will rejoin the Horizon League in 2026 after a nearly 30-year absence.

Ball State and Miami shared the regular season championship with a 16–2 record Madi Morson of Central Michigan won player of the year. In the 2026 MAC women's basketball tournament, Miami defeated Kent State, Ohio, and Toledo to win the MAC tournament title, their first since 2008, to advance to the 2026 NCAA tournament. Amber Scalia of Miami was named tournament MVP.

== Head coaches ==
=== Coaching changes ===
==== Buffalo ====
After a 30 win season, a WNIT Championship, and a 61–37 record at Buffalo over three seasons, Becky Burke was hired as the head coach at Arizona on April 14, 2025. On April 18, Buffalo hired Kristen Sharkey, former Buffalo basketball player and assistant coach, as the school's 14th women's basketball head coach.

==== Northern Illinois ====
Lisa Carlsen resigned from as the Northern Illinois women's basketball coach on March 10, 2025, after a 13–17 season and an overall 147–155 record over nine seasons with the Huskies. On April 1, NIU hired Buffalo associate head coach Jacey Brooks as the new head coach.

==== Western Michigan ====
Shane Clipfell announced his retirement from coaching on March 17, 2025, after 13 seasons and a 184–209 record as the head coach of Western Michigan University. On March 28, Detroit Mercy head coach Kate Achter was named the seventh head coach in program history.

=== Coaches ===
Team	Head coach	Previous job	Years at school	Overall record	School record	MAC record	MAC titles	MAC tournament titles	NCAA tournaments	NCAA Final Fours	NCAA championships
Akron	Ryan Gensler	Illinois (Asst.)	3	20–38 (.345)	20–38 (.345)	9–25 (.265)	0	0	0	0	0
Ball State	Brady Sallee	Eastern Illinois	14	400–265 (.602)	264–155 (.630)	159–76 (.677)	1	1	1	0	0
Bowling Green	Fred Chmiel	South Carolina (Asst.)	3	34–28 (.548)†	34–28 (.548)	21–15 (.583)	0	0	0	0	0
Buffalo	Kristen Sharkey	Syracuse (Assoc. HC)	1	0–0 (–)	0–0 (–)	0–0 (–)	0	0	0	0	0
Central Michigan	Kristin Haynie	Michigan State (Asst.)	3	18–38 (.321)	18–38 (.321)	11–23 (.324)	0	0	0	0	0
Eastern Michigan	Sahar Nusseibeh	Canisius	2	34–87 (.281)	2–27 (.069)	1–17 (.056)	0	0	0	0	0
Kent State	Todd Starkey	Indiana (Asst.)	10	329–206 (.615)	164–111 (.596)	97–65 (.599)	0	1	1	0	0
Miami	Glenn Box	Indiana (Assoc HC.)	3	92–62 (.597)	28–31 (.475)	17–19 (.472)	0	0	0	0	0
Northern Illinois	Jacey Brooks	Buffalo (Assoc HC.)	1	79–32 (.712)	0–0 (–)	0–0 (–)	0	0	0	0	0
Ohio	Bob Boldon	Youngstown State	13	300–251 (.544)	202–161 (.556)	118–97 (.549)	2	1	1	0	0
Toledo	Ginny Boggess	Monmouth	2	78–51 (.605)	24–9 (.727)	13–5 (.722)	0	0	0	0	0
UMass	Mike Leflar	UMass (Assoc. HC)	3	22–42 (.344)	22–42 (.344)	0–0 (–)	0	0	0	0	0
Western Michigan	Kate Achter	Detroit Mercy	1	104–166 (.385)	0–0 (–)	0–0 (–)	0	0	0	0	0

Notes:

- Appearances, titles, etc. are from time with current school only.
- Years at school includes 2025–26 season.
- MAC records are from time at current school only.
- All statistics and records are through the beginning of the season.
- †Chmiel's overall record does not include his coaching record at Feather River College and Lassen College because it is unknown to the author.

== Preseason ==
The MAC Men's & Women's Basketball Tip-Off was held on Tuesday, October 21, 2025. Each team had their head coach and a student athlete from both the men's and women's basketball team for interviews.

MAC Women's Basketball Preview Coaches & Student-Athletes

- Akron: Head Coach Ryan Gensler & Keiryn McGuff (Junior, Guard/Forward)
- Ball State: Head Coach Brady Sallee & Grace Kingery (Sophomore, Guard)
- Bowling Green: Head Coach Fred Chmiel & Paige Kohler (Junior, Guard)
- Buffalo: Head Coach Kristen Sharkey & Gabby McDuffie (Grad., Guard)
- Central Michigan: Head Coach Kristin Haynie & Zareia Chevre (5th, Forward)
- Eastern Michigan: Head Coach Sahar Nusseibeh & Sisi Eleko (Senior, Forward)
- Kent State: Head Coach Todd Starkey & Janae Tyler (Junior, Forward)
- Miami: Head Coach Glenn Box & Amber Tretter (Junior, Forward)
- Northern Illinois: Head Coach Jacey Brooks & Alecia Doyle (Senior, Guard)
- Ohio: Head Coach Bob Boldon & Elli Garnett (Grad., Forward)
- Toledo: Head Coach Ginny Boggess & Patricia Anumgba (Grad., Guard)
- Western Michigan: Head Coach Kate Achter & Alli Carlson (Senior, Guard)

=== Preseason women's basketball coaches poll ===
Women's Basketball Preseason Poll
Place	Team	Points	First place votes
1.	Kent State	133	5
2.	Toledo	118	2
3.	UMass	115	3
4.	Ball State	112	3
5.	Central Michigan	105	--
6.	Bowling Green	101	--
7.	Miami	86	--
8.	Akron	51	--
9.	Western Michigan	48	--
10.	Ohio	44	--
11.	Buffalo	42	--
12.	Eastern Michigan	36	--
13.	Northern Illinois	23	--

MAC tournament champions: Kent State (5), UMass (3), Toledo (3), Ball State (1), Miami (1)

=== MAC Preseason All-Conference ===
Honor	Recipient
Preseason All-MAC First Team	Janae Tyler, Kent State, Junior
Preseason All-MAC First Team	Kendall Carruthers, Toledo, Junior
Preseason All-MAC First Team	Madi Morson, Central Michigan, Sophomore
Preseason All-MAC First Team	Paige Kohler, Bowling Green, Junior
Preseason All-MAC First Team	Sisi Eleko, Eastern Michigan, Senior
Preseason All-MAC Second Team	Amber Tretter, Miami, Junior
Preseason All-MAC Second Team	Ayanna-Sarai Darrington, Central Michigan, Sophomore
Preseason All-MAC Second Team	Megan Olbrys, UMass, Senior
Preseason All-MAC Second Team	Mya Babbitt, Kent State, Junior
Preseason All-MAC Second Team	Yahmani McKayle, UMass, Sophomore

== Regular season ==
Ball State and Miami shared the regular season championship with a 16–2 record.

=== Rankings ===
		Pre	Wk 2	Wk 3	Wk 4	Wk 5	Wk 6	Wk 7	Wk 8	Wk 9	Wk 10	Wk 11	Wk 12	Wk 13	Wk 14	Wk 15	Wk 16	Wk 17	Wk 18	Wk 19	Final
Akron	AP																				
Akron	C																				
Ball State	AP																				
Ball State	C																				
Bowling Green	AP																				
Bowling Green	C																				
Buffalo	AP																				
Buffalo	C																				
Central Michigan	AP																				
Central Michigan	C																				
Eastern Michigan	AP																				
Eastern Michigan	C																				
Kent State	AP																				
Kent State	C																				
Miami	AP																				
Miami	C																				
Northern Illinois	AP																				
Northern Illinois	C																				
Ohio	AP																				
Ohio	C																				
Toledo	AP																				
Toledo	C																				
UMass	AP																				
UMass	C																				
Western Michigan	AP																				
Western Michigan	C																				

Legend
	Improvement in ranking
	Drop in ranking
	Not ranked previous week
	No change in ranking from previous week
RV	Received votes but were not ranked in Top 25 of poll
т	Tied with team above or below also with this symbol

== Postseason ==
=== Mid–American Tournament ===
Miami defeated Kent State, Ohio and Toledo to win their first tournament since 2009 and advance to the 2026 NCAA tournament. Amber Scalia was the tournament MVP.

=== NCAA tournament ===
As a 13 seed Miami drew the West Virginia Mountaineers in the first round.

=== Women's National Invitation Tournament ===
Ohio was the only program to accepted a bid where they will play UMBC.

== All-MAC awards ==
=== Mid-American men's basketball weekly awards ===
Week	Player(s) of the Week	School
Nov 10	Bree Salenbien	Ball State
Nov 17	Johnea Donahue	Bowling Green
Nov 24	Bree Salenbien (2)	Ball State
Dec 1	Sisi Eleko	Eastern Michigan
Dec 8	Amber Tretter	Miami
Dec 15	Sisi Eleko (2)	Eastern Michigan
Dec 22	Johnea Donahue (2)	Bowling Green
Dec 29	N/A	
Jan 5	Fernanda Ovalle	Eastern Michigan
Jan 12	Madi Morson	Central Michigan
Jan 19	Emory Klatt	Kent State
Jan 26	Ilse de Vries	Miami
Feb 2	Tessa Towers	Ball State
Feb 9	Amber Tretter (2)	Miami
Feb 16	Bree Salenbien (3)	Ball State
Feb 23	Megan Olbrys	UMass
Mar 2	Ayanna-Sarai Darrington	Central Michigan
Mar 9	Madi Morson (2)	Central Michigan

=== Postseason awards ===
2026 Mid-American Women's Basketball Individual Awards
Award	Recipient(s)
Player of the Year	Madi Morson, Central Michigan
Coach of the Year	Glenn Box, Miami
Defensive Player of the Year	Johnea Donahue, Bowling Green
Freshman of the Year	Peyton Hill, Eastern Michigan
Sixth Man Award	Emory Klatt, Kent State

=== All-MAC Honors ===
2026 Mid-American Women's Basketball All-Conference Teams
First Team	Second Team	Third Team	Honorable Mention	All-Defensive	Freshman Team
Tessa Towers, Ball State; Bree Salenbien, Ball State; Madi Morson, Central Michigan; Yahmani McKayle, UMas; Amber Tretter, Miami	Ayanna-Sarai Darrington, Central Michigan; Sisi Eleko, Eastern Michigan; Mya Babbitt, Kent State; Megan Olbrys, UMass; Bailey Tabeling, Ohio	Paige Kohler, Bowling Green; Ilse De Vries, Miami; Tamar Singer, Miami; Kendall Carruthers, Toledo; Patricia Anumgba, Toledo	Grace Kingery, Ball State; Johnea Donahue, Bowling Green; Peyton Hill, Eastern Michigan; Allie Palmieri, UMass; Faith Fedd-Robinson, Toledo	Shaena Brew, Akron; Aniss Tagayi, Ball State; Aniya Rowe, Buffalo; Peyton Hill, Eastern Michigan; Emilie Sorensen, Northern Illinois	Aniss Tagayi, Ball State; Johnae Donahue, Bowling Green; Ayanna Franks, UMass; Ilse De Vries, Miami; Tamar Singer, Miami

== See also ==
- 2025–26 Mid-American Conference men's basketball season
