= 2025–26 Miami RedHawks women's basketball team =

American college basketball season

2025–26 Miami RedHawks women's basketball

MAC regular-season co-champions MAC tournament champions

NCAA tournament, First Round
- Conference: Mid-American Conference
- Record: 28–7 (16–2 MAC)
- Head coach: Glenn Box (3rd season)
- Associate head coach: Ben Wierzba
- Assistant coaches: JR Shumate; Maya Chandler; Avery Wright
- Home arena: Millett Hall

2025–26 Mid-American Conference women's basketball standings
	Conf.				Overall
Team	W		L	PCT	W		L	PCT
Miami (OH) †	16	–	2	.889	28	–	7	.800
Ball State	16	–	2	.889	26	–	7	.788
UMass	15	–	3	.833	23	–	7	.767
Central Michigan	12	–	6	.667	18	–	12	.600
Ohio	11	–	7	.611	18	–	14	.563
Toledo	9	–	9	.500	17	–	15	.531
Bowling Green	9	–	9	.500	17	–	14	.548
Kent State	9	–	9	.500	15	–	16	.484
Eastern Michigan	6	–	12	.333	13	–	16	.448
Western Michigan	5	–	13	.278	9	–	20	.310
Akron	4	–	14	.222	7	–	24	.226
Northern Illinois	4	–	14	.222	7	–	23	.233
Buffalo	1	–	17	.056	3	–	27	.100
† 2026 MAC tournament winner

The 2025–26 Miami RedHawks women's basketball team represented Miami University during the 2025–26 NCAA Division I women's basketball season. The RedHawks, led by third-year head coach Glenn Box, played their home games at Millett Hall in Oxford, Ohio as members of the Mid-American Conference (MAC).

Miami shared the regular season championship with Ball State with a 16–2 record In the 2026 MAC women's basketball tournament, Miami defeated Kent State, Ohio, and Toledo to win the MAC tournament title, their first since 2008, to advance to the 2026 NCAA tournament. Amber Scalia of Miami was named tournament MVP.

As a 13 seed Miami drew the West Virginia Mountaineers in the first round.

== Previous Season ==
The 2024–25 Miami RedHawks women's basketball team finished the 2024–25 season 19–12, 11–4 in MAC play, to finish in a tie for fifth place.

== Preseason ==
On October 21, 2025, the MAC released the preseason coaches poll. Miami was picked to finish seventh in the MAC regular season.

=== Preseason rankings ===
MAC preseason poll
Predicted finish	Team	Votes (1st place)
1.	Kent State	133 (5)
2.	Toledo	118 (2)
3.	UMass	115 (3)
4.	Ball State	112 (3)
5.	Central Michigan	105
6.	Bowling Green	101
7.	Miami	86
8.	Akron	51
9.	Western Michigan	48
10.	Ohio	44
11.	Buffalo	42
12.	Eastern Michigan	36
13.	Northern Illinois	23

MAC tournament champions: Kent State (5), UMass (3), Toledo (3), Ball State (1), Miami (1)

=== Preseason All-MAC ===
Preseason All-MAC teams
Team	Player	Year
2nd	Amber Tretter	Junior

== Roster ==
2025–26 Miami RedHawks women's basketball team
Players
Coaches

Pos.	#	Name	Height	Year	Previous school	Hometown
G	1	Amber Scalia	5 ft 9 in (1.75 m)	Sr	Stillwater	Stillwater, MN
G	7	Clara Gonzalez Planella	5 ft 8 in (1.73 m)	Sr	UEM Femeni Maresme	Barcelona, Spain
G	10	Macie Taylor	5 ft 7 in (1.7 m)	RS Jr	Troy	Troy, OH
G	11	Anna Hurst	5 ft 8 in (1.73 m)	Fr	Stow-Munroe Falls	Silver Lake, OH
G	13	Tamar Singer	5 ft 4 in (1.63 m)	So	Ironi He	Haifa, Israel
F	15	Amber Tretter	6 ft 1 in (1.85 m)	Jr	Forest Park	Ferdinand, IN
G	17	Núria Jurjo	5 ft 01 in (1.55 m)	Jr	Institut Montserrat Roig	Barcelona, Spain
F	21	Ilse de Vries	6 ft 3 in (1.91 m)	So	Calandlyceum	Groningen, Netherlands
G	22	Ashton Elley	5 ft 10 in (1.78 m)	Sr	Little Rock Christian Academy	Little Rock, Arkansas
F	23	Emily VanTimmeren	6 ft 3 in (1.91 m)	RS Fr	Jenison	Allendale, Michigan
G	30	Mio Sakano	5 ft 10 in (1.78 m)	Jr	IMG Academy	Yamanashi, Japan
F	41	Brook Blumenfeld	6 ft 0 in (1.83 m)	RS Jr	Glenbrook North	Northbrook, Illinois

Head coach

- Glenn Box (Southeast Missouri State)

Assistant coach(es)

- Ben Wierzba (SIU Edwardsville)
- JR Shumate (Otterbein)
- Maya Chandler (SMU)
- Avery Wright (Texas Tech)

Legend

- (C) Team captain
- (S) Suspended
- (I) Ineligible
- (W) Walk-on
- Injured
- Current redshirt

Roster
Last update: 2026-01-19

== Schedule and results ==
Date time, TV	Rank^{#}	Opponent^{#}	Result	Record	High points	High rebounds	High assists	Site (attendance) city, state
Non-conference regular season
November 3, 2025*; 6:00 p.m., ESPN+		at Coastal Carolina; MAC–SBC Challenge	W 63–53	1–0	16 – Singer	11 – Tretter	3 – Tied	HTC Center (880); Conway, SC
November 7, 2025*; 5:00 p.m., ESPN+		Cedarville	W 88–49	2–0	18 – Tretter	10 – Tretter	6 – Singer	Millett Hall (505); Oxford, OH
November 10, 2025*; 6:30 p.m., ESPN+		Oakland	L 75–80	2–1	18 – Singer	9 – Tretter	5 – Singer	Millett Hall (418); Oxford, OH
November 13, 2025*; 1:00 p.m., ESPN+		IU-Southeast	W 94–40	3–1	16 – Blumenfeld	8 – Tretter	12 – Singer	Millett Hall (603); Oxford, OH
November 16, 2025*; 2:00 PM, ESPN+		at Bellarmine	W 77–58	4–1	26 – Scalia	12 – Tretter	7 – Taylor	Knights Hall (360); Louisville, KY
November 23, 2025*; 2:00 PM, BTN		at Purdue	L 68–79	4–2	21 – Singer	5 – Tretter	11 – Singer	Mackey Arena (3,780); West Lafayette, IN
November 28, 2025*; 5:30 PM, ESPN+		vs. Washington State; Paradise Jam - Reef Division	L 67–71	4–3	16 – De Vries	15 – Tretter	6 – Singer	Elridge Blake Sports and Fitness Center; Charlotte Amalie, Virgin Islands
November 29, 2025*; 5:00 PM, ESPN+		vs. Marist; Paradise Jam - Reef Division - Consolation	W 63–37	5–3	13 – Scalia	13 – Tretter	7 – Singer	Elridge Blake Sports and Fitness Center; Charlotte Amalie, Virgin Islands
December 3, 2025*; 11:30 AM, ESPN+		at Cincinnati	W 75–71	6–3	24 – Singer	11 – Tretter	7 – Singer	Fifth Third Arena (2,949); Cincinnati, Ohio
December 7, 2025*; 1:00 PM, ESPN+		Western Kentucky	W 80–53	7–3	20 – Tretter	5 – Tretter	12 – Singer	Millett Hall (451); Oxford, OH
December 14, 2025*; 3:00 PM, ESPN+		at Colorado	L 55–75	7–4	18 – Scalia	4 – Tretter	4 – Singer	CU Events Center (2,315); Boulder, CO
December 20, 2025*; 1:00 PM, ESPN+		Green Bay	W 66–50	8–4	20 – De Vries	7 – Jurjo	5 – Singer	Millett Hall (317); Oxford, OH
MAC regular season
December 31, 2025; 12:00 PM, ESPN+		at Kent State	W 67–63	9–4 (1–0)	16 – Singer	9 – Singer	8 – Singer	M.A.C. Center (1,124); Kent, OH
January 3, 2026; 1:00 PM, ESPN+		Toledo	W 63–55	10–4 (2–0)	17 – Tretter	4 – Tretter	7 – Singer	Millett Hall (1,011); Oxford, OH
January 7, 2026; 7:00 PM, ESPN+		UMass	W 72–60	11–4 (3–0)	17 – Tretter	10 – Tretter	11 – Singer	Millett Hall (312); Oxford, OH
January 10, 2026; 12:00 PM, ESPN+		at Akron	W 79–56	12–4 (4–0)	18 – Scalia	6 – Jurjo	10 – Singer	James A. Rhodes Arena (727); Akron, OH
January 14, 2026; 7:00 PM, ESPN+		Eastern Michigan	W 69–55	13–4 (5–0)	16 – Tretter	7 – De Vries	10 – Singer	Millett Hall (219); Oxford, OH
January 17, 2026; 4:00 PM, ESPN+		at Bowling Green	W 51–49	14–4 (6–0)	17 – De Vries	8 – Tretter	9 – Singer	Stroh Center (1,917); Bowling Green, OH
January 21, 2026; 7:00 PM, ESPN+		Buffalo	W 76-52	15-4 (7-0)	17 – De Vries	6 – De Vries	6 – Singer	Millett Hall (421); Oxford, OH
January 24, 2026; 11:00 AM, ESPN+		at Ball State	W 72–52	16–4 (8–0)	23 – De Vries	7 – De Vries	8 – Singer	Worthen Arena; Muncie, IN
January 28, 2026; 12:00 PM, ESPN+		at Northern Illinois	W 71-43	17–4 (9–0)	17 – Tretter	6 – Tretter	8 – Singer	NIU Convocation Center (1,622); Dekalb, IL
January 31, 2026; 1:00 PM, ESPN+		Ohio	W 90-70	18–4 (10–0)	23 – Scalia	10 – Tretter	9 – Singer	Millett Hall (5,034); Oxford, OH
February 7, 2026*; 1:00 PM, ESPN+		Georgia Southern; MAC–SBC Challenge	W 78–67	19–4	32 – Tretter	13 – Tretter	9 – Singer	Millett Hall (507); Oxford, OH
February 10, 2026; 7:00 PM, ESPN+		at Western Michigan	W 60-55	20-4 (11-0)	25 – De Vries	8 – Tretter	2 – Scalia	University Arena (650); Kalamazoo, MI
February 15, 2026; 1:00 PM, ESPN+		at UMass	L 64-65	20-5 (11-1)	20 – Tretter	9 – Scalia	4 – Singer	Mullins Center (1,472); Amherst, MA
February 18, 2026; 7:00 PM, ESPN+		Central Michigan	W 65-53	21-5 (12-1)	18 – Scalia	8 – Tretter	9 – Singer	Millett Hall (517); Oxford, OH
February 21, 2026; 1:00 PM, ESPN+		Ball State	W 68-64	22-5 (13-1)	25 – Singer	9 – De Vries	3 – Singer	Millett Hall (1,904); Oxford, OH
February 25, 2026; 6:30 PM, ESPN+		at Eastern Michigan	W 78-60	23-5 (14-1)	25 – Tretter	13 – Tretter	8 – Singer	George Gervin GameAbove Center (1,167); Ypsilanti, MI
February 28, 2026; 1:00 PM, ESPN+		Akron	W 74-56	24-5 (15-1)	15 – Jurjo	7 – De Vries	4 – Singer	Millett Hall (792); Oxford, OH
March 4, 2026; 7:00 PM, ESPN+		Kent State	W 71-52	25-5 (16-1)	22 – Tretter	10 – Tretter	7 – Singer	Millett Hall (1,019); Oxford, OH
March 7, 2026; 1:00 PM, ESPN+		at Ohio	L 62-77	25-6 (16-2)	16 – Gonzalez Planella	7 – Tretter	6 – Singer	Convocation Center (660); Athens, OH
MAC tournament
March 11, 2026; 11:00 AM, ESPN+	(1)	vs. (8) Kent State; Quarterfinals	W 65-58	26-6	25 – Singer	7 – Scalia	7 – Singer	Rocket Arena; Cleveland, OH
March 13, 2026; 10:00 AM, ESPN+	(1)	vs. (5) Ohio; Semifinals	W 80-52	27-6	22 – Scalia	11 – Tretter	7 – Singer	Rocket Arena; Cleveland, OH
March 14, 2026; 11:00 AM, CBSSN	(1)	vs. (6) Toledo; Championship	W 68-58	28-6	23 – Tretter	10 – Tretter	5 – Singer	Rocket Arena (2,173); Cleveland, OH
NCAA tournament
March 21, 2026*; 5:00 PM, ESPNU	(13 FW3)	at (4 FW3) No. 11 West Virginia; First Round	L 54–82	28–7	–	–	–	Hope Coliseum; Morgantown, WV
*Non-conference game. ^{#}Rankings from AP poll. (#) Tournament seedings in parentheses. FW3=Fort Worth 3. All times are in Eastern.

== Honors ==
=== In Season ===
During the season the following players were recognized for superior performance as MAC Player of the Week:

Week 5: Amber Tretter
Week 12: Ilse de Vries
Week 14: Amber Tretter

=== Postseason ===
Following the season the following MAC awards were conferred upon Miami RedHawks individuals:

Coach of the year: Glenn Box
All-MAC First Team: Amber Tretter
All-MAC Third Team: Ilse De Vries and Tamar Singer
MAC All-Defensive Team: Ilse De Vries and Tamar Singer

== Rankings ==
Ranking movements Legend: — = Not ranked
	Week																				
Poll	Pre	1	2	3	4	5	6	7	8	9	10	11	12	13	14	15	16	17	18	19	Final
AP	—	—	—	—	—	—	—	—	—*	—	—	—	—	—	—	—	—	—	—	—	—
Coaches	—	—	—	—	—	—	—	—	—	—	—	—	—	—	—	—	—	—	—	—	—

*AP did not release a week 8 poll.
