= Miami RedHawks basketball =

Miami RedHawks basketball may refer to either of the basketball teams that represent Miami University:

- Miami RedHawks men's basketball
- Miami RedHawks women's basketball
