= 2025–26 Toledo Rockets women's basketball team =

American college basketball season

2025–26 Toledo Rockets women's basketball
- Conference: Mid-American Conference
- Record: 17–15 (9–9 MAC)
- Head coach: Ginny Boggess (2nd season)
- Associate head coach: Geoff Lanier
- Assistant coach: Hailey Yohn
- Home arena: Savage Arena

2025–26 Mid-American Conference women's basketball standings
	Conf.				Overall
Team	W		L	PCT	W		L	PCT
Miami (OH) †	16	–	2	.889	28	–	7	.800
Ball State	16	–	2	.889	26	–	7	.788
UMass	15	–	3	.833	23	–	7	.767
Central Michigan	12	–	6	.667	18	–	12	.600
Ohio	11	–	7	.611	18	–	14	.563
Toledo	9	–	9	.500	17	–	15	.531
Bowling Green	9	–	9	.500	17	–	14	.548
Kent State	9	–	9	.500	15	–	16	.484
Eastern Michigan	6	–	12	.333	13	–	16	.448
Western Michigan	5	–	13	.278	9	–	20	.310
Akron	4	–	14	.222	7	–	24	.226
Northern Illinois	4	–	14	.222	7	–	23	.233
Buffalo	1	–	17	.056	3	–	27	.100
† 2026 MAC tournament winner

The 2025–26 Toledo Rockets women's basketball team represented the University of Toledo during the 2025–26 NCAA Division I women's basketball season. The Rockets, led by second-year head coach Ginny Boggess, played their home games at Savage Arena in Toledo, Ohio as members of the Mid-American Conference.

== Previous season ==
The Rockets finished the 2024–25 season 24–9, 13–5 in MAC play, to finish in a tie for second place. They defeated Central Michigan and Buffalo, before falling to top-seeded Ball State in the MAC tournament championship game. They received an at-large bid to the WBIT, where they would be defeated by eventual tournament champions Minnesota in the First Round.

== Preseason ==
On October 21, 2025, the Mid-American Conference released their preseason poll. Toledo was picked to finish second in the conference, with two first-place votes.

=== Preseason rankings ===
MAC Preseason Poll
Place	Team	Votes
1	Kent State	133 (5)
2	Toledo	118 (2)
3	UMass	115 (3)
4	Ball State	112 (3)
5	Central Michigan	105
6	Bowling Green	101
7	Miami	86
8	Akron	51
9	Western Michigan	48
10	Ohio	44
11	Buffalo	42
12	Eastern Michigan	36
13	Northern Illinois	23
(#) first-place votes

=== Tournament Champions ===
MAC Tournament Champions
Team	Votes
Kent State	5
UMass	3
Toledo	3
Ball State	1
Miami	1

=== Preseason All-MAC Teams ===
Preseason All-MAC Teams
Team	Player	Year
First	Kendall Carruthers	Junior

== Roster ==
2025–26 Toledo Rockets women's basketball team
Players
Coaches

Pos.	#	Name	Height	Year	Previous school	Hometown
G	2	Faith Fedd-Robinson	5 ft 11 in (1.8 m)	So	Newark Central High School	Newark, New Jersey
G	3	Camryn VandenBosch	6 ft 0 in (1.83 m)	Fr	Holland Christian High School	Holland, Michigan
G	4	Kendall Carruthers	5 ft 7 in (1.7 m)	Jr	Saint Francis (PA)	Toledo, Ohio
G	5	Alexa Hocevar	6 ft 1 in (1.85 m)	Jr	IU Indy	Willoughby Hills, Ohio
G	8	Patricia Anumgba	5 ft 7 in (1.7 m)	GS	Towson	Silver Spring, Maryland
PF	10	Evalyse Cole	6 ft 2 in (1.88 m)	So	Easton Area High School	Easton, Pennsylvania
G	11	Destiny Robinson	5 ft 7 in (1.7 m)	So	Fremont Ross High School	Fremont, Ohio
G	12	Ella Weaver	6 ft 0 in (1.83 m)	Jr	William Monroe High School	Ruckersville, Virginia
F	13	Lizzy Puot	6 ft 1 in (1.85 m)	Jr	Kirkwood Community College	Des Moines, Iowa
F	21	Miriam Diala	6 ft 1 in (1.85 m)	So	George Washington	Heidelberg, Germany
G	22	Elisha Dykstra	5 ft 11 in (1.8 m)	Fr	West Catholic High School	Grand Rapids, Michigan
G	24	Cadence Dykstra	5 ft 8 in (1.73 m)	Jr	West Catholic High School	Grand Rapids, Michigan
C	32	Evyn Carrier	6 ft 4 in (1.93 m)	RS So	Western Michigan	Sycamore, Illinois

Head coach

- Ginny Boggess (Wingate)

Assistant coach(es)

- Geoff Lanier (Southern Connecticut)
- Hailey Yohn (Coker)

Legend

- (C) Team captain
- (S) Suspended
- (I) Ineligible
- (W) Walk-on
- Injured
- Current redshirt

Roster
Last update: July 6, 2026

== Schedule and results ==
Date time, TV	Rank^{#}	Opponent^{#}	Result	Record	High points	High rebounds	High assists	Site (attendance) city, state
Exhibition
October 29, 2025*; 7:00 pm		Saginaw Valley State	W 74–62	–	15 – Cole	10 – Hocevar	–	Savage Arena; Toledo, OH
Regular season
November 3, 2025*; 7:00 pm, ESPN+		at Troy; MAC-SBC Challenge	L 51–88	0–1	12 – Cole	5 – Tied	3 – Fedd-Robinson	Trojan Arena (1,184); Troy, AL
November 9, 2025*; 2:30 pm, CBSSN		Gonzaga	L 69–72	0–2	15 – Carruthers	5 – Cole	4 – Tied	Savage Arena (4,127); Toledo, OH
November 16, 2025*; 2:00 pm, ESPN+		Detroit Mercy	W 66–52	1–2	17 – Fedd-Robinson	8 – Diala	2 – Tied	Savage Arena (3,685); Toledo, OH
November 19, 2025*; 11:00 am, ESPN+		at Northern Kentucky	L 61–70	1–3	19 – Fedd-Robinson	7 – Fedd-Robinson	2 – Tied	Truist Arena (3,147); Highland Heights, KY
November 25, 2025*; 6:30 pm, ESPN+		at Youngstown State	W 69−65	2−3	18 – Anumgba	10 – Fedd-Robinson	4 – Cole	Beeghly Center (1,342); Youngstown, OH
December 2, 2025*; 7:00 pm, ESPN+		Morgan State	W 79−66	3−3	27 – Carruthers	9 – Fedd-Robinson	5 – Anumgba	Savage Arena (3,645); Toledo, OH
December 6, 2025*; 2:00 pm, ESPN+		Northern Iowa	L 52–68	3–4	19 – Carruthers	6 – Tied	3 – Anumgba	Savage Arena (3,727); Toledo, OH
December 14, 2025*; 1:00 pm, B1G+		at No. 21 Ohio State	L 60–85	3–5	21 – Weaver	7 – Diala	4 – Carruthers	Value City Arena (5,652); Columbus, OH
December 17, 2025*; 7:00 pm, ESPN+		Wayne State	W 75–63	4–5	20 – Carruthers	8 – Fedd-Robinson	3 – Tied	Savage Arena (3,702); Toledo, OH
December 22, 2025*; 3:00 pm, ESPN+		at Long Beach State	W 64–43	5–5	12 – Tied	8 – Cole	4 – Carruthers	LBS Financial Credit Union Pyramid; Long Beach, CA
December 31, 2025; 2:00 pm, ESPN+		Buffalo	W 79–46	6–5 (1–0)	19 – Anumgba	9 – Fedd-Robinson	5 – C. Dykstra	Savage Arena (3,860); Toledo, OH
January 3, 2026; 1:00 pm, ESPN+		at Miami (OH)	L 55−63	6−6 (1–1)	12 – Carruthers	6 – Tied	4 – Anumgba	Millett Hall (1,011); Oxford, OH
January 7, 2026; 6:30 pm, ESPN+		at Ball State	L 68–72	6–7 (1–2)	19 – Carruthers	11 – Diala	4 – C. Dykstra	Worthen Arena (1,653); Muncie, IN
January 10, 2026; 2:00 pm, ESPN+		Western Michigan	W 59–46	7–7 (2–2)	14 – Fedd-Robinson	7 – Cole	8 – Tied	Savage Arena (4,229); Toledo, OH
January 14, 2026; 7:00 pm, ESPN+		Northern Illinois	W 70–49	8–7 (3–2)	24 – Anumgba	6 – Fedd-Robinson	4 – Tied	Savage Arena (3,471); Toledo, OH
January 20, 2026; 6:30 pm, ESPN+		at Eastern Michigan	L 71–76	8–8 (3–3)	22 – Anumgba	6 – Hocevar	3 – Tied	George Gervin GameAbove Center (1,105); Ypsilanti, MI
January 24, 2026; 1:00 pm, ESPN+		at Ohio	W 75–66	9–8 (4–3)	16 – Fedd-Robinson	8 – Tied	6 – Fedd-Robinson	Convocation Center (500); Athens, OH
January 28, 2026; 7:00 pm, ESPN+		Kent State	W 59–53	10–8 (5–3)	18 – Weaver	6 – Tied	3 – Tied	Savage Arena (3,920); Toledo, OH
January 31, 2026; 5:00 pm, ESPN+		Bowling Green	W 59–49	11–8 (6–3)	15 – Weaver	15 – Fedd-Robinson	2 – Tied	Savage Arena (5,461); Toledo, OH
February 4, 2026; 6:00 pm, ESPN+		at Akron	L 74–77	11–9 (6–4)	20 – Anumgba	8 – Fedd-Robinson	5 – Carruthers	James A. Rhodes Arena (920); Akron, OH
February 7, 2026*; 2:00 pm, ESPN+		Southern Miss; MAC-SBC Challenge	W 76–67	12–9	25 – Anumgba	15 – Fedd-Robinson	6 – Carruthers	Savage Arena (4,296); Toledo, OH
February 10, 2026; 7:00 pm, ESPN+		Ohio	L 67–71	12–10 (6–5)	20 – Anumgba	16 – Fedd-Robinson	5 – C. Dykstra	Savage Arena (3,866); Toledo, OH
February 14, 2026; 2:00 pm, ESPN+		Eastern Michigan	W 62–51	13–10 (7–5)	15 – Fedd-Robinson	11 – Fedd-Robinson	3 – Tied	Savage Arena (4,315); Toledo, OH
February 18, 2026; 6:00 pm, ESPN+		at UMass	W 60–52	14–10 (8–5)	22 – Anumgba	7 – Tied	2 – Tied	Mullins Center (945); Amherst, MA
February 21, 2026; 2:00 pm, ESPN+		at Bowling Green	L 52–61	14–11 (8–6)	13 – Carruthers	9 – Weaver	4 – Tied	Stroh Center (2,009); Bowling Green, OH
February 25, 2026; 7:00 pm, ESPN+		Central Michigan	L 64–68	14–12 (8–7)	16 – Weaver	7 – Hocevar	3 – Tied	Savage Arena (3,974); Toledo, OH
February 28, 2026; 4:30 pm, ESPN+		at Buffalo	L 66–69	14–13 (8–8)	17 – Weaver	7 – Tied	5 – Tied	Alumni Arena (1,310); Amherst, NY
March 4, 2026; 7:00 pm, ESPN+		at Western Michigan	W 56–49	15–13 (9–8)	25 – Carruthers	5 – Tied	2 – Anumgba	University Arena (786); Kalamazoo, MI
March 7, 2026; 2:00 pm, ESPN+		Ball State	L 71–78	15–14 (9–9)	24 – Anumgba	11 – Weaver	6 – Carruthers	Savage Arena (5,139); Toledo, OH
MAC tournament
March 11, 2026; 6:55 pm, ESPN+	(6)	vs. (3) UMass; Quarterfinals	W 67–56	16–14	19 – Anumgba	12 – Anumgba	5 – C. Dykstra	Rocket Arena (1,379); Cleveland, OH
March 13, 2026; 12:30 pm, ESPN+	(6)	vs. (2) Ball State; Semifinals	W 69–65	17–14	29 – Anumgba	9 – Tied	5 – Carruthers	Rocket Arena (1,312); Cleveland, OH
March 14, 2026; 11:00 am, CBSSN	(6)	vs. (1) Miami (OH); Championship	L 58–68	17–15	22 – Anumgba	8 – Tied	4 – Anumgba	Rocket Arena (2,173); Cleveland, OH
*Non-conference game. ^{#}Rankings from AP Poll. (#) Tournament seedings in parentheses. All times are in Eastern.
