= 2025–26 Bowling Green Falcons women's basketball team =

American college basketball season

2025–26 Bowling Green Falcons women's basketball
- Conference: Mid-American Conference
- Record: 17–14 (9–9 MAC)
- Head coach: Fred Chmiel (3rd season)
- Assistant coaches: Maggie Lucas; John Nicolais; Kadie Hempfling
- Home arena: Stroh Center

2025–26 Mid-American Conference women's basketball standings
	Conf.				Overall
Team	W		L	PCT	W		L	PCT
Miami (OH) †	16	–	2	.889	28	–	7	.800
Ball State	16	–	2	.889	26	–	7	.788
UMass	15	–	3	.833	23	–	7	.767
Central Michigan	12	–	6	.667	18	–	12	.600
Ohio	11	–	7	.611	18	–	14	.563
Toledo	9	–	9	.500	17	–	15	.531
Bowling Green	9	–	9	.500	17	–	14	.548
Kent State	9	–	9	.500	15	–	16	.484
Eastern Michigan	6	–	12	.333	13	–	16	.448
Western Michigan	5	–	13	.278	9	–	20	.310
Akron	4	–	14	.222	7	–	24	.226
Northern Illinois	4	–	14	.222	7	–	23	.233
Buffalo	1	–	17	.056	3	–	27	.100
† 2026 MAC tournament winner

The 2025–26 Bowling Green Falcons women's basketball team represented Bowling Green State University during the 2025–26 NCAA Division I women's basketball season. The Falcons, led by third-year head coach Fred Chmiel, played their home games at the Stroh Center in Bowling Green, Ohio as members of the Mid-American Conference.

== Previous season ==
The Falcons finished the 2024–25 season 18–13, 11–7 in MAC play, to finish in a tie for fifth place. They were defeated by Buffalo in the quarterfinals of the MAC tournament.

== Preseason ==
On October 21, 2025, the Mid-American Conference released their preseason poll. Bowling Green was picked to finish sixth in the conference.

=== Preseason rankings ===
MAC Preseason Poll
Place	Team	Votes
1	Kent State	133 (5)
2	Toledo	118 (2)
3	UMass	115 (3)
4	Ball State	112 (3)
5	Central Michigan	105
6	Bowling Green	101
7	Miami	86
8	Akron	51
9	Western Michigan	48
10	Ohio	44
11	Buffalo	42
12	Eastern Michigan	36
13	Northern Illinois	23
(#) first-place votes

=== Tournament Champions ===
MAC Tournament Champions
Team	Votes
Kent State	5
UMass	3
Toledo	3
Ball State	1
Miami	1

=== Preseason All-MAC Teams ===
Preseason All-MAC Teams
Team	Player	Year
First	Paige Kohler	Junior

== Roster ==
2025–26 Bowling Green Falcons women's basketball team
Players
Coaches

Pos.	#	Name	Height	Year	Previous school	Hometown
G/F	0	Laila Harrison	6 ft 1 in (1.85 m)	So	Mount Notre Dame High School	Cincinnati, Ohio
G	1	Kaia Woods	5 ft 3 in (1.6 m)	Sr	Akron	Tiffin, Ohio
G	2	Emily Siesel	5 ft 6 in (1.68 m)	Sr	Buckeye Central High School	New Washington, Ohio
G	3	Johnea Donahue	5 ft 8 in (1.73 m)	So	Snider High School	Fort Wayne, Indiana
F	4	Jaedyn Cook	6 ft 3 in (1.91 m)	Jr	Odessa College	Richmond, Virginia
F	8	Joniyah Bland-Fitzpatrick	5 ft 10 in (1.78 m)	Jr	Seton Hall	New London, Connecticut
G	10	Paige Kohler	5 ft 8 in (1.73 m)	Jr	Olmsted Falls High School	Olmsted Falls, Ohio
F	11	Taya Ellis	6 ft 1 in (1.85 m)	Jr	Royal Crown Academy	Toronto, Ontario
G	12	Ky'Aira Miller	5 ft 7 in (1.7 m)	Fr	Purcell Marian High School	Cincinnati, Ohio
F	13	Sofia Moschen	6 ft 2 in (1.88 m)	RS Fr	Centro Educational Leonardo Da Vinci	São Paulo, Brazil
G	20	Jasmine Fearne	6 ft 0 in (1.83 m)	RS Jr	Hickory Ridge High School	Cairns, Australia
F	22	Lauren Gerken	6 ft 1 in (1.85 m)	So	Liberty-Benton High School	Findlay, Ohio
F	33	Kendal Moxey	6 ft 3 in (1.91 m)	Sr	Daytona State College	Centreville, Maryland

Head coach

- Fred Chmiel (Excelsior)

Assistant coach(es)

- Maggie Lucas (Penn State)
- John Nicolais (Glenville State)
- Kadie Hempfling (Bowling Green)

Legend

- (C) Team captain
- (S) Suspended
- (I) Ineligible
- (W) Walk-on
- Injured
- Current redshirt

Roster
Last update: July 7, 2026

== Schedule and results ==
Date time, TV	Rank^{#}	Opponent^{#}	Result	Record	High points	High rebounds	High assists	Site (attendance) city, state
Exhibition
October 24, 2025*; 7:00 pm		Wooster	W 114–35	–	19 – Ellis	12 – Ellis	6 – Siesel	Stroh Center (1,212); Bowling Green, OH
Regular season
November 3, 2025*; 7:00 pm, ESPN+		at Louisiana; MAC-Sun Belt Challenge	W 82–67	1–0	18 – Kohler	10 – Gerken	4 – Kohler	Cajundome (516); Lafayette, LA
November 7, 2025*; 7:00 pm, SECN+		at No. 2 South Carolina	L 47–114	1–1	10 – Bland-Fitzpatrick	4 – Tied	5 – Kohler	Colonial Life Arena (16,649); Columbia, SC
November 12, 2025*; 7:30 pm, B1G+		at Wisconsin	L 78–90	1–2	24 – Donahue	6 – Tied	6 – Donahue	Kohl Center (2,368); Madison, WI
November 14, 2025*; 7:30 pm, ESPN+		at Marquette	L 55–71	1–3	16 – Donahue	6 – Tied	3 – Donahue	Al McGuire Center (1,112); Milwaukee, WI
November 21, 2025*; 9:15 pm, GNAC Network		vs. UC Irvine; Great Alaska Shootout semifinals	L 50−75	1−4	18 – Kohler	6 – Tied	5 – Donahue	Alaska Airlines Center (2,001); Anchorage, AK
November 22, 2025*; 9:15 pm, GNAC Network		at Alaska Anchorage; Great Alaska Shootout 3rd place game	W 67−63	2−4	19 – Kohler	7 – Ellis	4 – Tied	Alaska Airlines Center (2,095); Anchorage, AK
November 30, 2025*; 2:00 pm, ESPN+		Purdue Fort Wayne	W 56–53	3–4	15 – Kohler	8 – Ellis	5 – Donahue	Stroh Center (1,042); Bowling Green, OH
December 3, 2025*; 7:00 pm, ESPN+		Kentucky State	W 103–32	4–4	14 – Ellis	9 – Ellis	6 – Donahue	Stroh Center (868); Bowling Green, OH
December 7, 2025*; 1:00 pm, ESPN+		Defiance	W 118–35	5–4	18 – Cook	13 – Ellis	5 – Tied	Stroh Center (961); Bowling Green, OH
December 14, 2025*; 2:00 pm, ESPN+		Lourdes	W 104–76	6–4	17 – Tied	10 – Kohler	10 – Kohler	Stroh Center (1,691); Bowling Green, OH
December 16, 2025*; 11:00 am, ESPN+		Le Moyne	W 74–46	7–4	17 – Kohler	5 – Woods	7 – Woods	Stroh Center (2,656); Bowling Green, OH
December 20, 2025; 2:00 pm, ESPN+		Kent State	W 73−69	8−4 (1–0)	19 – Donahue	11 – Donahue	3 – Tied	Stroh Center (1,919); Bowling Green, OH
December 30, 2025; 5:00 pm, ESPN+		at Eastern Michigan	L 76–86	8–5 (1–1)	18 – Kohler	10 – Donahue	4 – Woods	George Gervin GameAbove Center (1,441); Ypsilanti, MI
January 3, 2026; 2:00 pm, ESPN+		Central Michigan	L 56–68	8–5 (1–2)	16 – Moxey	15 – Moxey	2 – Donahue	Stroh Center (1,790); Bowling Green, OH
January 10, 2026; 3:00 pm, ESPN+		at Northern Illinois	W 65–48	9–6 (2–2)	15 – Moxey	8 – Moxey	5 – Tied	NIU Convocation Center (881); DeKalb, IL
January 14, 2026; 7:00 pm, ESPN+		at Western Michigan	W 61–54	10–6 (3–2)	15 – Tied	5 – Tied	5 – Donahue	University Arena (659); Kalamazoo, MI
January 17, 2026; 4:00 pm, ESPN+		Miami (OH)	L 49–51	10–7 (3–3)	11 – Tied	6 – Tied	3 – Tied	Stroh Center (1,917); Bowling Green, OH
January 21, 2026; 7:00 pm, ESPN+		Ohio	L 57–82	10–8 (3–4)	10 – Tied	6 – Gerken	4 – Tied	Stroh Center (1,601); Bowling Green, OH
January 24, 2026; 11:00 am, ESPN+		at UMass	L 64–65	10–9 (3–5)	20 – Ellis	9 – Ellis	4 – Donahue	Mullins Center (868); Amherst, MA
January 28, 2026; 7:00 pm, ESPN+		Akron	W 80–62	11–9 (4–5)	21 – Donahue	10 – Woods	3 – Tied	Stroh Center (1,326); Bowling Green, OH
January 31, 2026; 5:00 pm, ESPN+		at Toledo	L 49–59	11–10 (4–6)	19 – Donahue	7 – Donahue	3 – Donahue	Savage Arena (5,461); Toledo, OH
February 4, 2026; 7:00 pm, ESPN+		at Kent State	L 64–73	11–11 (4–7)	19 – Kohler	8 – Ellis	3 – Tied	MAC Center (1,092); Kent, OH
February 7, 2026*; 2:00 pm, ESPN+		Coastal Carolina; MAC-Sun Belt Challenge	W 93–82	12–11	21 – Bland-Fitzpatrick	7 – Donahue	7 – Woods	Stroh Center (1,807); Bowling Green, OH
February 10, 2026; 7:00 pm, ESPN+		Buffalo	W 72–61	13–11 (5–7)	26 – Kohler	9 – Kohler	6 – Tied	Stroh Center (1,450); Bowling Green, OH
February 14, 2026; 11:00 am, ESPN+		at Ball State	L 67–82	13–12 (5–8)	17 – Kohler	7 – Ellis	5 – Woods	Worthen Arena (3,418); Muncie, IN
February 18, 2026; 7:00 pm, ESPN+		Western Michigan	W 67–63	14–12 (6–8)	16 – Kohler	10 – Ellis	5 – Woods	Stroh Center (1,494); Bowling Green, OH
February 21, 2026; 2:00 pm, ESPN+		Toledo	W 61–52	15–12 (7–8)	17 – Kohler	11 – Ellis	7 – Donahue	Stroh Center (2,009); Bowling Green, OH
February 25, 2026; 7:00 pm, ESPN+		at Ohio	W 60–56 ^{OT}	16–12 (8–8)	16 – Ellis	16 – Ellis	3 – Tied	Convocation Center (683); Athens, OH
March 4, 2026; 6:30 pm, ESPN+		at Central Michigan	L 65–77	16–13 (8–9)	16 – Kohler	8 – Ellis	4 – Kohler	McGuirk Arena (1,784); Mount Pleasant, MI
March 7, 2026; 2:00 pm, ESPN+		Northern Illinois	W 77–66	17–13 (9–9)	20 – Kohler	8 – Donahue	7 – Donahue	Stroh Center (1,987); Bowling Green, OH
MAC tournament
March 11, 2026; 4:00 pm, ESPN+	(7)	vs. (2) Ball State; Quarterfinals	L 63–75	17–14	16 – Kohler	10 – Donahue	4 – Donahue	Rocket Arena; Cleveland, OH
*Non-conference game. ^{#}Rankings from AP Poll. (#) Tournament seedings in parentheses. All times are in Eastern.
