= 2025–26 Western Michigan Broncos women's basketball team =

American college basketball season

2025–26 Western Michigan Broncos women's basketball
- Conference: Mid-American Conference
- Record: 9–20 (5–13 MAC)
- Head coach: Kate Achter (1st season)
- Associate head coach: Adam Tandez
- Assistant coaches: Andrea Cecil; Aurielle Anderson; Audra Emmerson
- Home arena: University Arena

2025–26 Mid-American Conference women's basketball standings
	Conf.				Overall
Team	W		L	PCT	W		L	PCT
Miami (OH) †	16	–	2	.889	28	–	7	.800
Ball State	16	–	2	.889	26	–	7	.788
UMass	15	–	3	.833	23	–	7	.767
Central Michigan	12	–	6	.667	18	–	12	.600
Ohio	11	–	7	.611	18	–	14	.563
Toledo	9	–	9	.500	17	–	15	.531
Bowling Green	9	–	9	.500	17	–	14	.548
Kent State	9	–	9	.500	15	–	16	.484
Eastern Michigan	6	–	12	.333	13	–	16	.448
Western Michigan	5	–	13	.278	9	–	20	.310
Akron	4	–	14	.222	7	–	24	.226
Northern Illinois	4	–	14	.222	7	–	23	.233
Buffalo	1	–	17	.056	3	–	27	.100
† 2026 MAC tournament winner

The 2025–26 Western Michigan Broncos women's basketball team represented Western Michigan University during the 2025–26 NCAA Division I women's basketball season. The Broncos, led by first-year head coach Kate Achter, played their home games at University Arena in Kalamazoo, Michigan as members of the Mid-American Conference.

== Previous season ==
The Broncos finished the 2024–25 season 12–18, 8–10 in MAC play, to finish in eighth place. They were defeated by top-seeded and eventual tournament champions Ball State in the quarterfinals of the MAC tournament.

Following the season, on March 17, 2025, head coach Shane Clipfell announced that he would be retiring, ending his 13-year career with the Broncos. Almost two weeks later, on March 30, the school announced that they would be hiring Detroit Mercy head coach Kate Achter as the team's next head coach.

== Preseason ==
On October 21, 2025, the Mid-American Conference released their preseason poll. Western Michigan was picked to finish ninth in the conference.

=== Preseason rankings ===
MAC Preseason Poll
Place	Team	Votes
1	Kent State	133 (5)
2	Toledo	118 (2)
3	UMass	115 (3)
4	Ball State	112 (3)
5	Central Michigan	105
6	Bowling Green	101
7	Miami	86
8	Akron	51
9	Western Michigan	48
10	Ohio	44
11	Buffalo	42
12	Eastern Michigan	36
13	Northern Illinois	23
(#) first-place votes

=== Tournament Champions ===
MAC Tournament Champions
Team	Votes
Kent State	5
UMass	3
Toledo	3
Ball State	1
Miami	1

=== Preseason All-MAC Teams ===
No players were named to either Preseason All-MAC First or Second Teams.

== Roster ==
2025–26 Western Michigan Broncos women's basketball team
Players
Coaches

Pos.	#	Name	Height	Year	Previous school	Hometown
G	2	Alli Harness	5 ft 6 in (1.68 m)	So	Carroll High School	Burlington, Indiana
G	3	Olivia Flynn	5 ft 9 in (1.75 m)	Fr	Harbor Springs High School	Harbor Springs, Michigan
F	4	De'Ahna Richardson	6 ft 1 in (1.85 m)	RS Sr	Bolingbrook High School	Bolingbrook, Illinois
F	10	D'Myjah Bolds	6 ft 3 in (1.91 m)	So	O'Fallon High School	O'Fallon, Illinois
F	11	Emma Dibarboure	6 ft 1 in (1.85 m)	Fr	Ramiro de Maeztu High School	Madrid, Spain
G	12	Alli Carlson	5 ft 6 in (1.68 m)	Sr	East Grand Rapids High School	Grand Rapids, Michigan
F	14	Mary Clare Brusek	6 ft 0 in (1.83 m)	Sr	Marist High School	Evergreen Park, Illinois
C	15	Lauren Audino	6 ft 2 in (1.88 m)	GS	St. Mary Catholic Secondary School	Welland, Ontario
G/F	16	Adelina Urtane	6 ft 0 in (1.83 m)	Jr	Western Nebraska Community College	Aizkraukle, Latvia
G	17	Irene Trujillo	6 ft 0 in (1.83 m)	Fr	IES Joaquin Artiles	Agüimes, Spain
G	20	Kailey Starks	5 ft 7 in (1.7 m)	So	Detroit Mercy	Evanston, Illinois
F	23	Ariana Wilkes	6 ft 2 in (1.88 m)	Sr	High Point	Columbia, South Carolina
G	30	Morasha Wiggins	6 ft 0 in (1.83 m)	RS Sr	Arizona State	Kalamazoo, Michigan
G	33	Nile Muguira Orbe	5 ft 6 in (1.68 m)	Jr	Lointek Gernika Bizkaia Club	Guernica, Spain

Head coach

- Kate Achter (Bowling Green)

Assistant coach(es)

- Adam Tandez (Marquette)
- Andrea Cecil (Florida Gulf Coast)
- Aurielle Anderson (Western Michigan)
- Audra Emmerson (Purdue Fort Wayne)

Legend

- (C) Team captain
- (S) Suspended
- (I) Ineligible
- (W) Walk-on
- Injured
- Current redshirt

Roster
Last update: July 14, 2026

== Schedule and results ==
Date time, TV	Rank^{#}	Opponent^{#}	Result	Record	High points	High rebounds	High assists	Site (attendance) city, state
Regular season
November 3, 2025*; 6:30 pm, ESPN+		at Appalachian State; MAC-SBC Challenge	L 45–65	0–1	11 – Richardson	7 – Starks	5 – Carlson	Holmes Center (511); Boone, NC
November 9, 2025*; 1:00 pm, ESPN+		Duquesne	L 64–72	0–2	11 – Tied	7 – Richardson	7 – Carlson	University Arena (765); Kalamazoo, MI
November 13, 2025*; 7:00 pm, ESPN+		at Milwaukee	W 65–64	1–2	22 – Richardson	6 – Tied	6 – Carlson	Klotsche Center (392); Milwaukee, WI
November 16, 2025*; 2:00 pm, B1G+		at No. 24 Michigan State	L 44–98	1–3	11 – Richardson	10 – Wilkes	3 – Tied	Breslin Center (3,653); East Lansing, MI
November 25, 2025*; 6:30 pm, ESPN+		Roosevelt	L 70−82 ^{OT}	1−4	17 – Muguira Orbe	15 – Wilkes	7 – Carlson	University Arena (667); Kalamazoo, MI
December 3, 2025*; 6:00 pm, B1G+		at Indiana	L 53−71	1−5	12 – Tied	9 – Bolds	4 – Carlson	Simon Skjodt Assembly Hall (7,409); Bloomington, IN
December 7, 2025*; 2:00 pm, ESPN+		at Loyola Chicago	W 58–45	2–5	13 – Harness	9 – Richardson	6 – Carlson	Joseph J. Gentile Arena (382); Chicago, IL
December 14, 2025*; 1:00 pm, ESPN+		Valparaiso	W 58–48	3–5	14 – Brusek	8 – Bolds	4 – Carlson	University Arena (623); Kalamazoo, MI
December 18, 2025*; 6:30 pm, ESPN+		Dayton	L 58–65	3–6	23 – Harness	6 – Carlson	5 – Carlson	University Arena (655); Kalamazoo, MI
December 22, 2025*; 6:30 pm, B1G+		at No. 19 Ohio State	L 47–95	3–7	15 – Carlson	10 – Wilkes	3 – Tied	Value City Arena (5,078); Columbus, OH
December 31, 2025; 1:00 pm, ESPN+		at UMass	L 40–73	3–8 (0–1)	16 – Carlson	5 – Starks	2 – Tied	Mullins Center (1,405); Amherst, MA
January 3, 2026; 1:00 pm, ESPN+		Buffalo	W 83−65	4−8 (1–1)	22 – Carlson	7 – Bolds	6 – Tied	University Arena (744); Kalamazoo, MI
January 7, 2026; 7:00 pm, ESPN+		Akron	W 55–48	5–8 (2–1)	15 – Bolds	12 – Bolds	7 – Carlson	University Arena (632); Kalamazoo, MI
January 10, 2026; 2:00 pm, ESPN+		at Toledo	L 46–59	5–9 (2–2)	16 – Starks	6 – Carlson	5 – Carlson	Savage Arena (4,229); Toledo, OH
January 14, 2026; 7:00 pm, ESPN+		Bowling Green	L 54–61	5–10 (2–3)	20 – Starks	5 – Tied	2 – Tied	University Arena (659); Kalamazoo, MI
January 17, 2026; 1:00 pm, ESPN+		Ball State	L 57–78	5–11 (2–4)	19 – Starks	6 – Richardson	8 – Carlson	University Arena (756); Kalamazoo, MI
January 21, 2026; 7:00 pm, ESPN+		at Northern Illinois	L 56–64	5–12 (2–5)	17 – Bolds	6 – Bolds	4 – Muguira Orbe	NIU Convocation Center (570); DeKalb, IL
January 24, 2026; 3:30 pm, ESPN+		Central Michigan	L 44–64	5–13 (2–6)	17 – Richardson	6 – Wilkes	6 – Carlson	University Arena (1,547); Kalamazoo, MI
January 31, 2026; 2:00 pm, ESPN+		at Eastern Michigan	W 59–54	6–13 (3–6)	19 – Starks	10 – Carlson	4 – Carlson	George Gervin GameAbove Center (1,450); Ypsilanti, MI
February 4, 2026; 7:00 pm, ESPN+		at Ohio	L 37–76	6–14 (3–7)	12 – Starks	6 – Tied	1 – Tied	Convocation Center (643); Athens, OH
February 7, 2026*; 1:00 pm, ESPN+		South Alabama; MAC-SBC Challenge	W 73–67	7–14	33 – Starks	7 – Starks	2 – Tied	University Arena (772); Kalamazoo, MI
February 10, 2026; 7:00 pm, ESPN+		Miami (OH)	L 55–60	7–15 (3–8)	17 – Starks	7 – Wilkes	4 – Carlson	University Arena (650); Kalamazoo, MI
February 14, 2026; 1:00 pm, ESPN+		at Central Michigan	L 67–70	7–16 (3–9)	16 – Carlson	9 – Starks	3 – Tied	McGuirk Arena (1,616); Mount Pleasant, MI
February 18, 2026; 7:00 pm, ESPN+		at Bowling Green	L 63–67	7–17 (3–10)	13 – Richardson	9 – Wilkes	6 – Carlson	Stroh Center (1,494); Bowling Green, OH
February 21, 2026; 1:00 pm, ESPN+		Northern Illinois	W 65–60	8–17 (4–10)	22 – Carlson	6 – Richardson	6 – Carlson	University Arena (829); Kalamazoo, MI
February 25, 2026; 6:00 pm, ESPN+		at Buffalo	W 58–43	9–17 (5–10)	17 – Carlson	8 – Harness	5 – Carlson	Alumni Arena (1,290); Amherst, NY
February 28, 2026; 12:00 pm, ESPN+		UMass	L 48–64	9–18 (5–11)	13 – Carlson	9 – Richardson	3 – Tied	University Arena (1,781); Kalamazoo, MI
March 4, 2026; 7:00 pm, ESPN+		Toledo	L 49–56	9–19 (5–12)	15 – Starks	7 – Tied	2 – Muguira Orbe	University Arena (786); Kalamazoo, MI
March 7, 2026; 1:00 pm, ESPN+		at Kent State	L 60–67	9–20 (5–13)	24 – Starks	9 – Bolds	4 – Carlson	MAC Center (1,171); Kent, OH
*Non-conference game. ^{#}Rankings from AP Poll. (#) Tournament seedings in parentheses. All times are in Eastern.
