= 2026 MAC women's basketball tournament =

- Classification: Division I
- Season: 2025–26
- Teams: 8
- Site: Rocket Arena; Cleveland, Ohio
- Champions: Miami (3 title)
- Winning coach: Glenn Box (1 title)
- MVP: Amber Scalia (Miami)
- Television: ESPN+ quarterfinals and semifinals & CBSSN championship
- MAC women's basketball tournaments

2025–26 Mid-American Conference women's basketball standings
	Conf.				Overall
Team	W		L	PCT	W		L	PCT
Miami (OH) †	16	–	2	.889	28	–	7	.800
Ball State	16	–	2	.889	26	–	7	.788
UMass	15	–	3	.833	23	–	7	.767
Central Michigan	12	–	6	.667	18	–	12	.600
Ohio	11	–	7	.611	18	–	14	.563
Toledo	9	–	9	.500	17	–	15	.531
Bowling Green	9	–	9	.500	17	–	14	.548
Kent State	9	–	9	.500	15	–	16	.484
Eastern Michigan	6	–	12	.333	13	–	16	.448
Western Michigan	5	–	13	.278	9	–	20	.310
Akron	4	–	14	.222	7	–	24	.226
Northern Illinois	4	–	14	.222	7	–	23	.233
Buffalo	1	–	17	.056	3	–	27	.100
† 2026 MAC tournament winner

The 2026 MAC women's basketball tournament was the postseason basketball tournament for the 2025–26 college basketball season in the Mid-American Conference (MAC). The entire tournament was played at Rocket Arena, in Cleveland, Ohio on March 11 and 13–14, 2026.

Miami defeated in order Kent State, Ohio, and Toledo to win the MAC tournament title, it was their first since 2008, to advance to the 2026 NCAA tournament. Amber Scalia of Miami was named the tournament MVP.

== Format ==
As with all MAC tournaments that have been held since 2021, only the top eight teams qualified. The winner of the tournament will receive the MAC's automatic bid to the 2026 NCAA tournament.

== Venue ==
The 2026 MAC tournament was at Rocket Arena for the 26th consecutive season. The venue is also the home of the Cleveland Cavaliers of the NBA, has a capacity for basketball of 19,432, and is located in downtown Cleveland at One Center Court.

== Seeds ==
Eight out of the thirteen MAC teams will qualified for the tournament. Teams were seeded by record within the conference games that got played, with a tiebreaker system to seed teams with identical conference records.

Seed	School	Conference record	Tiebreaker
1	Miami (OH)	16–2	2–0 vs. Ball State
2	Ball State	16–2	0–2 vs. Miami (OH)
3	UMass	15–3	
4	Central Michigan	12–6	
5	Ohio	11–7	
6	Toledo	9–9	2–1 vs. Bowling Green & Kent State
7	Bowling Green	9–9	2–2 vs. Toledo & Kent State
8	Kent State	9–9	1–2 vs. Toledo & Bowling Green
DNQ	Eastern Michigan	6–12	
DNQ	Western Michigan	5–13	
DNQ	Akron	4–14	1–0 vs. NIU
DNQ	Northern Illinois	4–14	0–1 vs. Akron
DNQ	Buffalo	1–17	

== Schedule ==
Session	Game	Time *	Matchup	Score	Attendance	Television
Quarterfinals – Wednesday, March 11
1	1	11:00 am	No. 1 Miami (OH) vs. No. 8 Kent State	65–58	1,379	ESPN+
1	2	30 mins after Game 1	No. 4 Central Michigan vs. No. 5 Ohio	88–89	1,379	ESPN+
1	3	30 mins after Game 2	No. 2 Ball State vs. No. 7 Bowling Green	75–63	1,379	ESPN+
1	4	30 mins after Game 3	No. 3 UMass vs. No. 6 Toledo	56–67	1,379	ESPN+
Semifinals – Friday, March 13
3	5	10:00 am	No. 1 Miami (OH) vs. No. 5 Ohio	80–52	1,352	ESPN+
3	6	30 mins after Game 5	No. 2 Ball State vs. No. 6 Toledo	65–69	1,352	ESPN+
Final – Saturday, March 14
5	7	11:00 am	No. 1 Miami (OH) vs. No. 6 Toledo	68–58	2,173	CBSSN
*Game times in EDT. Rankings denote tournament seeding.

NOTE: The Mid-American Conference men's and women's basketball tournaments are run simultaneously as one event and, as a result, the sessions are numbered consecutively (1, 3 and 5 are women's; 2, 4 and 6 are men's).

== Bracket ==
Quarterfinals; Wednesday, March 11; ESPN+
1	Miami (OH)	65
8	Kent State	58
4	Central Michigan	88
5	Ohio	89
2	Ball State	75
7	Bowling Green	63
3	UMass	56
6	Toledo	67

Semifinals; Friday, March 13; ESPN+
1	Miami (OH)	80
5	Ohio	52
2	Ball State	65
6	Toledo	69

Final; Saturday, March 14; CBSSN
1	Miami (OH)	68
6	Toledo	58

== All-Tournament team ==
Tournament MVP – Amber Scalia

Player	Team
Bree Salenbien	Ball State
Patricia Anumgba	Toledo
Amber Scalia	Miami
Amber Tretter	Miami
Tamer Singer	Miami

== See also ==
2026 MAC men's basketball tournament
