= 2025–26 Ball State Cardinals women's basketball team =

American college basketball season

2025–26 Ball State Cardinals women's basketball

MAC regular-season co-champions
- Conference: Mid-American Conference
- Record: 26–7 (16–2 MAC)
- Head coach: Brady Sallee (14th season)
- Associate head coach: Audrey Spencer
- Assistant coaches: Moriah Monaco; Casey Morrissette; Mariah King
- Home arena: Worthen Arena

2025–26 Mid-American Conference women's basketball standings
| | Conf. | | | | Overall |
| Team | W | | L | PCT | W | | L | PCT |
|---|---|---|---|---|---|---|---|---|
| Miami (OH) † | 16 | – | 2 | .889 | 28 | – | 7 | .800 |
| Ball State | 16 | – | 2 | .889 | 26 | – | 7 | .788 |
| UMass | 15 | – | 3 | .833 | 23 | – | 7 | .767 |
| Central Michigan | 12 | – | 6 | .667 | 18 | – | 12 | .600 |
| Ohio | 11 | – | 7 | .611 | 18 | – | 14 | .563 |
| Toledo | 9 | – | 9 | .500 | 17 | – | 15 | .531 |
| Bowling Green | 9 | – | 9 | .500 | 17 | – | 14 | .548 |
| Kent State | 9 | – | 9 | .500 | 15 | – | 16 | .484 |
| Eastern Michigan | 6 | – | 12 | .333 | 13 | – | 16 | .448 |
| Western Michigan | 5 | – | 13 | .278 | 9 | – | 20 | .310 |
| Akron | 4 | – | 14 | .222 | 7 | – | 24 | .226 |
| Northern Illinois | 4 | – | 14 | .222 | 7 | – | 23 | .233 |
| Buffalo | 1 | – | 17 | .056 | 3 | – | 27 | .100 |
† 2026 MAC tournament winner

The 2025–26 Ball State Cardinals women's basketball team represented Ball State University during the 2025–26 NCAA Division I women's basketball season. The Cardinals, led by 14th-year head coach Brady Sallee, played their home games at Worthen Arena in Muncie, Indiana as members of the Mid-American Conference.

== Previous season ==
The Cardinals finished the 2024–25 season 27–8, 16–2 in MAC play, to finish as MAC regular season champions. They defeated Western Michigan, Kent State, and Toledo to win the MAC tournament to send the Cardinals to their first NCAA tournament since 2009. In the NCAA tournament, they received the No. 12 seed in the Spokane Regional 1, where they were defeated by No. 5 seed Ole Miss in the first round.

== Preseason ==
On October 21, 2025, the Mid-American Conference released their preseason poll. Ball State was picked to finish fourth in the conference, with three first-place votes.

=== Preseason rankings ===
MAC Preseason Poll
| Place | Team | Votes |
|---|---|---|
| 1 | Kent State | 133 (5) |
| 2 | Toledo | 118 (2) |
| 3 | UMass | 115 (3) |
| 4 | Ball State | 112 (3) |
| 5 | Central Michigan | 105 |
| 6 | Bowling Green | 101 |
| 7 | Miami | 86 |
| 8 | Akron | 51 |
| 9 | Western Michigan | 48 |
| 10 | Ohio | 44 |
| 11 | Buffalo | 42 |
| 12 | Eastern Michigan | 36 |
| 13 | Northern Illinois | 23 |
(#) first-place votes

=== Tournament Champions ===
MAC Tournament Champions
| Team | Votes |
|---|---|
| Kent State | 5 |
| UMass | 3 |
| Toledo | 3 |
| Ball State | 1 |
| Miami | 1 |

=== Preseason All-MAC teams ===
No players were named to the First or Second Preseason All-MAC teams.

== Roster ==
2025–26 Ball State Cardinals women's basketball team
Players
Coaches

| Pos. | # | Name | Height | Year | Previous school | Hometown |
|---|---|---|---|---|---|---|
| F | 2 | Zhen Verburgt | 6 ft 1 in (1.85 m) | Fr | U19 Phantoms Basket Boom | Hemiksem, Belgium |
| G | 3 | Karsyn Norman | 5 ft 6 in (1.68 m) | Jr | Butler | Bedford, Indiana |
| G | 5 | Violeta Rojas | 5 ft 10 in (1.78 m) | Jr | Trinidad State | Manilva, Spain |
| F | 9 | Alba Caballero | 6 ft 3 in (1.91 m) | Fr | La Cora De Paterna Valencia | Ciudad Real, Spain |
| G | 10 | Giorgia Gorini | 5 ft 7 in (1.7 m) | Fr | CLV-Limonta Costa Masnaga | Genoa, Italy |
| G | 15 | Ashlynn Brooke | 5 ft 6 in (1.68 m) | Jr | Pioneer High School | Royal Center, Indiana |
| F | 21 | Brooke Winchester | 6 ft 0 in (1.83 m) | Fr | Warsaw Community High School | Warsaw, Indiana |
| C | 22 | Tessa Towers | 6 ft 5 in (1.96 m) | Sr | Wisconsin | Batavia, Illinois |
| G | 23 | Zuri Ransom | 5 ft 10 in (1.78 m) | So | Evanston High School | Evanston, Illinois |
| F | 24 | Aniss Tagayi | 6 ft 0 in (1.83 m) | Fr | Basket Lattes Montpellier Agglomération | Montpellier, France |
| G | 25 | Grace Kingery | 5 ft 11 in (1.8 m) | So | North Ridgeville High School | North Ridgeville, Ohio |
| G | 35 | Bree Salenbien | 6 ft 2 in (1.88 m) | Sr | Gonzaga | Adrian, Michigan |
| G | 77 | Laura Martinez | 5 ft 10 in (1.78 m) | Fr | Granada Más Baloncesta | Granada, Spain |

Head coach

- Brady Sallee (Thomas More)

Assistant coach(es)

- Audrey Spencer (Ball State)
- Moriah Monaco (Ball State)
- Casey Morrissette (Mount Union)
- Mariah King (Eastern Illinois)

Legend

- (C) Team captain
- (S) Suspended
- (I) Ineligible
- (W) Walk-on
- Injured
- Current redshirt

Roster
Last update: June 29, 2026

== Schedule and results ==
| Date time, TV | Rank^{#} | Opponent^{#} | Result | Record | High points | High rebounds | High assists | Site (attendance) city, state |
Regular season
| November 3, 2025*; 8:00 pm, ESPN+ | | at Arkansas State; MAC-SBC Challenge | W 68–66 | 1–0 | 15 – Kingery | 12 – Salenbien | 4 – Tied | First National Bank Arena (1,541); Jonesboro, AR |
| November 9, 2025*; 1:00 pm, ESPN+ | | at IU Indy | W 81–72 | 2–0 | 20 – Tied | 12 – Salenbien | 4 – Tied | The Jungle (512); Indianapolis, IN |
| November 12, 2025*; 6:30 pm, ESPN+ | | Northern Kentucky | W 95–64 | 3–0 | 20 – Salenbien | 8 – Towers | 5 – Norman | Worthen Arena (1,395); Muncie, IN |
| November 15, 2025*; 1:00 pm, ESPN+ | | at Memphis | W 83–59 | 4–0 | 21 – Kingery | 13 – Salenbien | 6 – Salenbien | Elma Roane Fieldhouse (741); Memphis, TN |
| November 20, 2025*; 6:30 pm, ESPN+ | | Cincinnati | W 83–63 | 5–0 | 26 – Salenbien | 12 – Towers | 9 – Norman | Worthen Arena (1,532); Muncie, IN |
| November 24, 2025*; 6:30 pm, ESPN+ | | UIC | L 64−66 | 5−1 | 19 – Towers | 11 – Towers | 5 – Tagayi | Worthen Arena (1,535); Muncie, IN |
| November 28, 2025*; 1:15 pm, WSN | | vs. Pittsburgh; Florida Gulf Classic | W 55−41 | 6−1 | 17 – Salenbien | 13 – Towers | 4 – Tied | Community School of Naples (300); Naples, FL |
| November 29, 2025*; 1:15 pm, WSN | | vs. Alabama A&M; Florida Gulf Classic | W 70–38 | 7–1 | 12 – Tagayi | 10 – Towers | 5 – Gorini | Community School of Naples (157); Naples, FL |
| December 3, 2025*; 11:00 am, ESPN+ | | Oakland City | W 119–34 | 8–1 | 26 – Salenbien | 11 – Caballero | 8 – Gorini | Worthen Arena (4,903); Muncie, IN |
| December 7, 2025*; 4:30 pm, ESPN+ | | at Davidson | L 65–87 | 8–2 | 21 – Salenbien | 9 – Salenbien | 5 – Norman | John M. Belk Arena (819); Davidson, NC |
| December 10, 2025*; 9:00 pm, ACCNX | | at No. 22 Louisville | L 62–93 | 8–3 | 13 – Salenbien | 9 – Verburgt | 2 – Tied | KFC Yum! Center (6,477); Louisville, KY |
| December 14, 2025*; 3:00 pm, Midco Sports 2/SLN | | at South Dakota State | L 59–78 | 8–4 | 17 – Towers | 8 – Salenbien | 6 – Salenbien | First Bank and Trust Arena (1,767); Brookings, SD |
| December 20, 2025; 11:00 am, ESPN+ | | Eastern Michigan | W 78−74 | 9−4 (1–0) | 21 – Tied | 7 – Tagayi | 8 – Norman | Worthen Arena (3,503); Muncie, IN |
| December 31, 2025; 12:00 pm, ESPN+ | | at Akron | W 102–73 | 10–4 (2–0) | 22 – Towers | 13 – Towers | 4 – Norman | James A. Rhodes Arena (846); Akron, OH |
| January 3, 2026; 3:00 pm, ESPN+ | | at Northern Illinois | W 74–56 | 11–4 (3–0) | 17 – Tied | 9 – Towers | 7 – Norman | NIU Convocation Center (1,027); DeKalb, IL |
| January 7, 2026; 6:30 pm, ESPN+ | | Toledo | W 72–68 | 12–4 (4–0) | 17 – Towers | 10 – Salenbien | 7 – Salenbien | Worthen Arena (1,653); Muncie, IN |
| January 14, 2026; 6:30 pm, ESPN+ | | Buffalo | W 103–61 | 13–4 (5–0) | 16 – Towers | 11 – Caballero | 8 – Norman | Worthen Arena (1,487); Muncie, IN |
| January 17, 2026; 1:00 pm, ESPN+ | | at Western Michigan | W 78–57 | 14–4 (6–0) | 18 – Kingery | 9 – Tied | 5 – Norman | University Arena (756); Kalamazoo, MI |
| January 21, 2026; 6:30 pm, ESPN+ | | UMass | W 78–60 | 15–4 (7–0) | 14 – Tied | 10 – Tied | 6 – Salenbien | Worthen Arena (1,411); Muncie, IN |
| January 24, 2026; 11:00 am, ESPN+ | | Miami (OH) | L 52–72 | 15–5 (7–1) | 18 – Salenbien | 9 – Salenbien | 3 – Tied | Worthen Arena (4,105); Muncie, IN |
| January 28, 2026; 6:30 pm, ESPN+ | | at Central Michigan | W 76–70 | 16–5 (8–1) | 17 – Norman | 12 – Salenbien | 5 – Norman | McGuirk Arena (1,353); Mount Pleasant, MI |
| February 1, 2026; 12:00 pm, CBSSN | | at Kent State | W 101–91 | 17–5 (9–1) | 29 – Towers | 11 – Towers | 10 – Salenbien | MAC Center (1,170); Kent, OH |
| February 4, 2026; 6:30 pm, ESPN+ | | Northern Illinois | W 83–48 | 18–5 (10–1) | 23 – Kingery | 5 – Tied | 5 – Norman | Worthen Arena (1,418); Muncie, IN |
| February 7, 2026*; 1:00 pm, ESPN+ | | Troy; MAC-SBC Challenge | W 87–86 | 19–5 | 19 – Towers | 9 – Towers | 6 – Salenbien | Worthen Arena (1,506); Muncie, IN |
| February 10, 2026; 6:30 pm, ESPN+ | | at Eastern Michigan | W 83–68 | 20–5 (11–1) | 22 – Tied | 8 – Towers | 5 – Norman | George Gervin GameAbove Center (1,103); Ypsilanti, MI |
| February 14, 2026; 11:00 am, ESPN+ | | Bowling Green | W 82–67 | 21–5 (12–1) | 32 – Salenbien | 10 – Towers | 8 – Norman | Worthen Arena (3,418); Muncie, IN |
| February 18, 2026; 6:00 pm, ESPN+ | | at Buffalo | W 88–55 | 22–5 (13–1) | 18 – Salenbien | 9 – Tagayi | 6 – Norman | Alumni Arena (1,099); Amherst, NY |
| February 21, 2026; 1:00 pm, ESPN+ | | at Miami (OH) | L 64–68 | 22–6 (13–2) | 22 – Towers | 8 – Tied | 7 – Salenbien | Millett Hall (1,904); Oxford, OH |
| February 25, 2026; 6:30 pm, ESPN+ | | Akron | W 88–55 | 23–6 (14–2) | 19 – Towers | 12 – Caballero | 4 – Tied | Worthen Arena (1,542); Muncie, IN |
| February 28, 2026; 1:00 pm, ESPN+ | | Ohio | W 86–85 | 24–6 (15–2) | 24 – Kingery | 10 – Caballero | 11 – Salenbien | Worthen Arena (2,015); Muncie, IN |
| March 7, 2026; 2:00 pm, ESPN+ | | at Toledo | W 78–71 | 25–6 (16–2) | 22 – Towers | 12 – Towers | 4 – Salenbien | Savage Arena (5,139); Toledo, OH |
MAC tournament
| March 11, 2026; 4:00 pm, ESPN+ | (2) | vs. (7) Bowling Green; Quarterfinals | W 75–63 | 26–6 | 25 – Kingery | 10 – Salenbien | 6 – Tied | Rocket Arena; Cleveland, OH |
| March 13, 2026; 12:15 pm, ESPN+ | (2) | vs. (6) Toledo; Semifinals | L 65–69 | 26–7 | 34 – Salenbien | 11 – Towers | 8 – Norman | Rocket Arena (1,312); Cleveland, OH |
*Non-conference game. ^{#}Rankings from AP Poll. (#) Tournament seedings in parentheses. All times are in Eastern.
