= 2025–26 UMass Minutewomen basketball team =

American college basketball season

2025–26 UMass Minutewomen basketball
- Conference: Mid-American Conference
- Record: 23–7 (15–3 MAC)
- Head coach: Mike Leflar (3rd season)
- Assistant coaches: Yolanda Cole; Clare Fitzpatrick; Dayna Smith
- Home arena: Mullins Center

2025–26 Mid-American Conference women's basketball standings
	Conf.				Overall
Team	W		L	PCT	W		L	PCT
Miami (OH) †	16	–	2	.889	28	–	7	.800
Ball State	16	–	2	.889	26	–	7	.788
UMass	15	–	3	.833	23	–	7	.767
Central Michigan	12	–	6	.667	18	–	12	.600
Ohio	11	–	7	.611	18	–	14	.563
Toledo	9	–	9	.500	17	–	15	.531
Bowling Green	9	–	9	.500	17	–	14	.548
Kent State	9	–	9	.500	15	–	16	.484
Eastern Michigan	6	–	12	.333	13	–	16	.448
Western Michigan	5	–	13	.278	9	–	20	.310
Akron	4	–	14	.222	7	–	24	.226
Northern Illinois	4	–	14	.222	7	–	23	.233
Buffalo	1	–	17	.056	3	–	27	.100
† 2026 MAC tournament winner

The 2025–26 UMass Minutewomen basketball team represented the University of Massachusetts Amherst during the 2025–26 NCAA Division I women's basketball season. The Minutewomen, led by third-year head coach Mike Leflar, played their home games at the Mullins Center in Amherst, Massachusetts, as first-year members of the Mid-American Conference.

== Previous season ==
The Minutewomen finished the 2024–25 season 17–15, 11–7 in A-10 play, to finish in a three-way tie for fifth place. They were defeated by Saint Louis in the quarterfinals of the A-10 tournament. They received an at-large bid to the WNIT, where they would defeat Stonehill in the first round, before falling to eventual tournament champions Buffalo in the second round. This was UMass' last season as members of the Atlantic 10 Conference, as they moved to the Mid-American Conference, starting in the 2025–26 season.

== Preseason ==
On October 21, 2025, the Mid-American Conference released their preseason poll. UMass was picked to finish third in the conference, with 3 first-place votes.

=== Preseason rankings ===
MAC Preseason Poll
Place	Team	Votes
1	Kent State	133 (5)
2	Toledo	118 (2)
3	UMass	115 (3)
4	Ball State	112 (3)
5	Central Michigan	105
6	Bowling Green	101
7	Miami	86
8	Akron	51
9	Western Michigan	48
10	Ohio	44
11	Buffalo	42
12	Eastern Michigan	36
13	Northern Illinois	23
(#) first-place votes

=== Tournament Champions ===
MAC Tournament Champions
Team	Votes
Kent State	5
UMass	3
Toledo	3
Ball State	1
Miami	1

=== Preseason All-MAC Teams ===
Preseason All-MAC Teams
Team	Player	Year
Second	Megan Olbrys	Senior

== Roster ==
2025–26 UMass Minutewomen women's basketball team
Players
Coaches

Pos.	#	Name	Height	Year	Previous school	Hometown
G	0	Anya George	5 ft 8 in (1.73 m)	Fr	Paul VI High School	Chester, Pennsylvania
G	1	Taylor Derkack	6 ft 0 in (1.83 m)	RS Fr	Colonia High School	Colonia, New Jersey
C	2	Chinenye Odenigbo	6 ft 4 in (1.93 m)	Jr	Noble and Greenough School	Walpole, Massachusetts
G	3	Aiyanna Perkins	5 ft 7 in (1.7 m)	Fr	Bella Vista College Prep	Phoenix, Arizona
F	4	Lilly Ferguson	5 ft 10 in (1.78 m)	Sr	Newington High School	Newington, Connecticut
F	7	Leah Bullard	6 ft 1 in (1.85 m)	So	Oakland	Tampa Bay, Florida
G	10	Yahmani McKayle	5 ft 6 in (1.68 m)	So	South Shore High School	Queens, New York
F	11	Megan Olbrys	6 ft 1 in (1.85 m)	Sr	Villanova	Norwood, Massachusetts
G	15	Brooke Pulpi	5 ft 8 in (1.73 m)	Fr	Reading Memorial High School	Reading, Massachusetts
F	17	Eva Hannon	6 ft 1 in (1.85 m)	Fr	Townsend Harris High School	Queens, New York
G	24	Allie Palmieri	5 ft 10 in (1.78 m)	GS	Seton Hall	Trumbull, Connecticut
F	30	Jess Ross	6 ft 3 in (1.91 m)	So	Tabor Academy	Eastham, Massachusetts
G	33	Ayanna Franks	5 ft 9 in (1.75 m)	So	Rhode Island	Windsor, Connecticut

Head coach

- Mike Leflar (Boston College)

Assistant coach(es)

- Yolanda Cole (Michigan)
- Clare Fitzpatrick (Cornell)
- Dayna Smith (Rhode Island)

Legend

- (C) Team captain
- (S) Suspended
- (I) Ineligible
- (W) Walk-on
- Injured
- Current redshirt

Roster
Last update: July 2, 2026

== Schedule and results ==
Date time, TV	Rank^{#}	Opponent^{#}	Result	Record	High points	High rebounds	High assists	Site (attendance) city, state
Exhibition
October 29, 2025*; 6:00 pm		Assumption	W 69–37	–	–	–	–	Mullins Center; Amherst, MA
Regular season
November 3, 2025*; 6:30 pm, ESPN+		at Old Dominion; MAC-SBC Challenge	W 58–52	1–0	14 – McKayle	9 – Olbrys	4 – Tied	Chartway Arena (1,706); Norfolk, VA
November 8, 2025*; 2:00 pm, ESPN+		Siena	W 84–73	2–0	20 – Palmieri	7 – Franks	8 – McKayle	Mullins Center (970); Amherst, MA
November 11, 2025*; 6:00 pm, ESPN+		Harvard	W 68–55	3–0	22 – McKayle	10 – Odenigbo	5 – Tied	Mullins Center (978); Amherst, MA
November 18, 2025*; 6:00 pm, ESPN+		UMass Lowell	W 85–45	4–0	20 – Franks	7 – Franks	6 – McKayle	Mullins Center (885); Amherst, MA
November 22, 2025*; 12:00 pm, ESPN+		Boston College	W 61–52	5–0	24 – Olbrys	12 – Olbrys	6 – McKayle	Mullins Center (1,161); Amherst, MA
November 25, 2025*; 6:00 pm, ESPN+		at Holy Cross	W 63−40	6−0	17 – McKayle	10 – Olbrys	5 – McKayle	Hart Center Arena (646); Worcester, MA
December 3, 2025*; 4:00 pm, FloCollege		at Northeastern	W 71−52	7−0	18 – Olbrys	7 – Palmieri	3 – Tied	Cabot Center (388); Boston, MA
December 6, 2025*; 12:00 pm, ESPN+		at Army	L 61–64	7–1	16 – Olbrys	9 – Olbrys	5 – Tied	Christl Arena (732); West Point, NY
December 19, 2025*; 1:30 pm, ESPN+		vs. Florida Atlantic; FIU Christmas Classic	W 66–50	8–1	18 – Olbrys	8 – Olbrys	4 – Tied	Ocean Bank Convocation Center (165); University Park, FL
December 20, 2025*; 1:30 pm, ESPN+		vs. Youngstown State; FIU Christmas Classic	L 69–72	8–2	25 – McKayle	7 – Olbrys	4 – Tied	Ocean Bank Convocation Center (82); University Park, FL
December 31, 2025; 1:00 pm, ESPN+		Western Michigan	W 73–40	9–2 (1–0)	14 – Odenigbo	10 – Ferguson	5 – Tied	Mullins Center (1,405); Amherst, MA
January 3, 2026; 3:30 pm, ESPN+		at Kent State	W 75–70	10–2 (2–0)	28 – McKayle	7 – Ferguson	3 – Tied	MAC Center (2,449); Kent, OH
January 7, 2026; 7:00 pm, ESPN+		at Miami (OH)	L 60−72	10−3 (2–1)	18 – Palmieri	13 – Olbrys	5 – Olbrys	Millett Hall (31); Oxford, OH
January 10, 2026; 1:00 pm, ESPN+		Central Michigan	W 74–72	11–3 (3–1)	18 – McKayle	11 – Ferguson	9 – McKayle	Mullins Center (1,739); Amherst, MA
January 14, 2026; 11:00 am, ESPN+		Akron	W 82–68	12–3 (4–1)	16 – Palmieri	7 – Ferguson	11 – McKayle	Mullins Center (5,121); Amherst, MA
January 17, 2026; 1:00 pm, ESPN+		at Buffalo	W 79–67	13–3 (5–1)	19 – Olbrys	16 – Olbrys	7 – McKayle	Alumni Arena (933); Amherst, NY
January 21, 2026; 6:30 pm, ESPN+		at Ball State	L 60–78	13–4 (5–2)	20 – McKayle	8 – Franks	5 – McKayle	Worthen Arena (1,411); Muncie, IN
January 24, 2026; 11:00 am, ESPN+		Bowling Green	W 65–64	14–4 (6–2)	20 – Palmieri	7 – Olbrys	8 – McKayle	Mullins Center (868); Amherst, MA
January 28, 2026; 7:00 pm, ESPN+		at Ohio	W 85–76	15–4 (7–2)	25 – McKayle	10 – Olbrys	6 – McKayle	Convocation Center (692); Athens, OH
February 4, 2026; 6:00 pm, ESPN+		Eastern Michigan	W 75–60	16–4 (8–2)	18 – Palmieri	7 – Ferguson	7 – Franks	Mullins Center (1,020); Amherst, MA
February 8, 2026*; 12:00 pm, CBSSN		James Madison; MAC-SBC Challenge	L 57–71	16–5	15 – Tied	7 – Ferguson	5 – Ferguson	Mullins Center (1,033); Amherst, MA
February 10, 2026; 6:00 pm, ESPN+		at Northern Illinois	W 75–54	17–5 (9–2)	21 – McKayle	11 – Olbrys	7 – McKayle	NIU Convocation Center (256); DeKalb, IL
February 14, 2026; 1:00 pm, ESPN+		Miami (OH)	W 65–64	18–5 (10–2)	15 – Palmieri	6 – Olbrys	5 – Olbrys	Mullins Center (1,472); Amherst, MA
February 18, 2026; 6:00 pm, ESPN+		Toledo	L 52–60	18–6 (10–3)	20 – Olbrys	10 – Olbrys	4 – Palmieri	Mullins Center (945); Amherst, MA
February 21, 2026; 1:00 pm, ESPN+		at Central Michigan	W 69–50	19–6 (11–3)	19 – Palmieri	12 – Olbrys	9 – McKayle	McGuirk Arena (1,802); Mount Pleasant, MI
February 25, 2026; 6:00 pm, ESPN+		Kent State	W 66–56	20–6 (12–3)	17 – McKayle	10 – Tied	7 – McKayle	Mullins Center (1,163); Amherst, MA
February 28, 2026; 12:00 pm, ESPN+		at Western Michigan	W 64–48	21–6 (13–3)	14 – Palmieri	6 – Tied	5 – McKayle	University Arena (1,781); Kalamazoo, MI
March 4, 2026; 6:00 pm, ESPN+		at Akron	W 74–64	22–6 (14–3)	23 – McKayle	6 – Olbrys	4 – Olbrys	James A. Rhodes Arena (738); Akron, OH
March 7, 2026; 1:00 pm, ESPN+		Buffalo	W 73–55	23–6 (15–3)	19 – Palmieri	6 – Olbrys	4 – Tied	Mullins Center (2,444); Amherst, MA
MAC tournament
March 11, 2026; 6:30 pm, ESPN+	(3)	vs. (6) Toledo; Quarterfinals	L 56–67	23–7	24 – McKayle	11 – Ferguson	2 – Tied	Rocket Arena (1,379); Cleveland, OH
*Non-conference game. ^{#}Rankings from AP Poll. (#) Tournament seedings in parentheses. All times are in Eastern.
