= 2025–26 Eastern Michigan Eagles women's basketball team =

American college basketball season

2025–26 Eastern Michigan Eagles women's basketball
- Conference: Mid-American Conference
- Record: 13–16 (6–12 MAC)
- Head coach: Sahar Nusseibeh (2nd season)
- Assistant coaches: Shareese Ulis; Emily Hays; Kayla Jackson; Alexis Mesuch
- Home arena: George Gervin GameAbove Center

2025–26 Mid-American Conference women's basketball standings
	Conf.				Overall
Team	W		L	PCT	W		L	PCT
Miami (OH) †	16	–	2	.889	28	–	7	.800
Ball State	16	–	2	.889	26	–	7	.788
UMass	15	–	3	.833	23	–	7	.767
Central Michigan	12	–	6	.667	18	–	12	.600
Ohio	11	–	7	.611	18	–	14	.563
Toledo	9	–	9	.500	17	–	15	.531
Bowling Green	9	–	9	.500	17	–	14	.548
Kent State	9	–	9	.500	15	–	16	.484
Eastern Michigan	6	–	12	.333	13	–	16	.448
Western Michigan	5	–	13	.278	9	–	20	.310
Akron	4	–	14	.222	7	–	24	.226
Northern Illinois	4	–	14	.222	7	–	23	.233
Buffalo	1	–	17	.056	3	–	27	.100
† 2026 MAC tournament winner

The 2025–26 Eastern Michigan Eagles women's basketball team represented Eastern Michigan University during the 2025–26 NCAA Division I women's basketball season. The Eagles, led by second-year head coach Sahar Nusseibeh, played their home games at the George Gervin GameAbove Center in Ypsilanti, Michigan as members of the Mid-American Conference.

== Previous season ==
The Eagles finished the 2024–25 season 2–27, 1–17 in MAC play, to finish in 12th (last) place. They failed to qualify for the MAC tournament, as only the top eight teams in the conference qualify.

== Preseason ==
On October 21, 2025, the Mid-American Conference released their preseason poll. Eastern Michigan was picked to 12th in the conference.

=== Preseason rankings ===
MAC Preseason Poll
Place	Team	Votes
1	Kent State	133 (5)
2	Toledo	118 (2)
3	UMass	115 (3)
4	Ball State	112 (3)
5	Central Michigan	105
6	Bowling Green	101
7	Miami	86
8	Akron	51
9	Western Michigan	48
10	Ohio	44
11	Buffalo	42
12	Eastern Michigan	36
13	Northern Illinois	23
(#) first-place votes

=== Tournament Champions ===
MAC Tournament Champions
Team	Votes
Kent State	5
UMass	3
Toledo	3
Ball State	1
Miami	1

=== Preseason All-MAC Teams ===
Preseason All-MAC Teams
Team	Player	Year
First	Sisi Eleko	Senior

== Roster ==
2025–26 Eastern Michigan Eagles women's basketball team
Players
Coaches

Pos.	#	Name	Height	Year	Previous school	Hometown
F	1	Alli Zajac	6 ft 2 in (1.88 m)	Fr	Tecumseh High School	Tecumseh, Michigan
PG	2	Ruby Brannon	5 ft 8 in (1.73 m)	Jr	East Central Community College	Woonona, Australia
G	3	Brooklyn Thrash	6 ft 0 in (1.83 m)	Sr	Canisius	Wayne, Ohio
G	4	Eirini Chatzinikoli	5 ft 7 in (1.7 m)	Jr	Dawson Community College	Athens, Greece
G	6	Fernanda Ovalle	5 ft 10 in (1.78 m)	Jr	Xavier	Santiago, Chile
G	7	Ainhoa Cea	5 ft 6 in (1.68 m)	Sr	Lipscomb	Irun, Spain
G	10	Artemis Kouki	6 ft 0 in (1.83 m)	GS	Western Michigan	Athens, Greece
F	11	Oliwia Pelka	6 ft 0 in (1.83 m)	Fr	Virtus Eirene Ragusa	Sosnowiec, Poland
F	14	Sisi Eleko	6 ft 2 in (1.88 m)	Sr	Canisius	Montreal, Quebec
C	15	Believe Tshibangu	6 ft 0 in (1.83 m)	Fr	Royal Crown School	Courtice, Ontario
PG	19	Paula Balada	5 ft 6 in (1.68 m)	Fr	Institut Creu de Saba	Barcelona, Spain
G	21	Marisa Cribari (W)	5 ft 7 in (1.7 m)	So	Canton High School	Canton, Michigan
PG	23	Peyton Hill	5 ft 10 in (1.78 m)	Fr	Incarnate Word Academy	St. Louis, Missouri
F	25	Sarah Rekowski	6 ft 3 in (1.91 m)	So	Western Michigan	Hartland, Michigan
F	33	Adrena Gordon	5 ft 11 in (1.8 m)	Fr	Example Academy	Akron, Ohio

Head coach

- Sahar Nusseibeh (American)

Assistant coach(es)

- Shareese Ulis (Cincinnati)
- Emily Hays (Washington & Jefferson)
- Kayla Jackson (Canisius)
- Alexis Mesuch (Eastern Michigan)

Legend

- (C) Team captain
- (S) Suspended
- (I) Ineligible
- (W) Walk-on
- Injured
- Current redshirt

Roster
Last update: July 13, 2026

== Schedule and results ==
Date time, TV	Rank^{#}	Opponent^{#}	Result	Record	High points	High rebounds	High assists	Site (attendance) city, state
Regular season
November 3, 2025*; 7:30 pm, ESPN+		at Louisiana–Monroe; MAC-SBC Challenge	L 71–80	0–1	24 – Eleko	7 – Eleko	5 – Cea	Fant–Ewing Coliseum (827); Monroe, LA
November 7, 2025*; 6:30 pm, ESPN+		at Canisius	W 70–39	1–1	14 – Tshibangu	11 – Eleko	5 – Cea	Koessler Athletic Center (809); Buffalo, NY
November 9, 2025*; 2:00 pm, B1G+		at No. 23 Michigan State	L 60–92	1–2	18 – Eleko	8 – Eleko	7 – Cea	Breslin Center (3,276); East Lansing, MI
November 14, 2025*; 8:00 pm, SLN		at St. Thomas	W 52–41	2–2	15 – Hill	13 – Eleko	9 – Cea	Lee & Penny Anderson Arena (370); St. Paul, MN
November 19, 2025*; 7:00 pm, ESPN+		at Purdue Fort Wayne	L 52–67	2–3	14 – Eleko	11 – Eleko	2 – Tied	Gates Sports Center (507); Fort Wayne, IN
November 26, 2025*; 1:00 pm, ESPN+		Robert Morris	W 64−54	3−3	23 – Eleko	14 – Eleko	6 – Cea	George Gervin GameAbove Center (1,242); Ypsilanti, MI
November 30, 2025*; 1:00 pm, ESPN+		at Detroit Mercy	W 64−55	4−3	21 – Hill	8 – Eleko	4 – Cea	Calihan Hall (256); Detroit, MI
December 5, 2025*; 5:00 pm, ESPN+		Defiance	W 96–44	5–3	19 – Eleko	11 – Eleko	6 – Cea	George Gervin GameAbove Center (1,343); Ypsilanti, MI
December 9, 2025*; 12:00 pm, ESPN+		Duquesne	W 74–72	6–3	23 – Eleko	11 – Eleko	7 – Cea	George Gervin GameAbove Center (1,228); Ypsilanti, MI
December 14, 2025*; 1:00 pm, B1G+		at Indiana	L 67–74	6–4	16 – Ovalle	18 – Eleko	6 – Cea	Simon Skjodt Assembly Hall (7,635); Bloomington, IN
December 20, 2025; 11:00 am, ESPN+		at Ball State	L 74–78	6–5 (0–1)	22 – Ovalle	4 – Tied	5 – Tied	Worthen Arena (3,503); Muncie, IN
December 30, 2025; 5:00 pm, ESPN+		Bowling Green	W 86–76	7–5 (1–1)	26 – Ovalle	10 – Ovalle	6 – Cea	George Gervin GameAbove Center (1,441); Ypsilanti, MI
January 7, 2026; 7:00 pm, ESPN+		at Ohio	L 87−96	7−6 (1–2)	24 – Ovalle	7 – Thrash	12 – Cea	Convocation Center (419); Athens, OH
January 10, 2026; 2:00 pm, ESPN+		Kent State	L 65–78	7–7 (1–3)	12 – Hill	12 – Tshibangu	4 – Ovalle	George Gervin GameAbove Center (1,165); Ypsilanti, MI
January 14, 2026; 7:00 pm, ESPN+		at Miami (OH)	L 55–69	7–8 (1–4)	19 – Eleko	8 – Cea	5 – Cea	Millett Hall (219); Oxford, OH
January 17, 2026; 1:00 pm, ESPN+		at Central Michigan	L 64–77	7–9 (1–5)	17 – Ovalle	11 – Eleko	4 – Cea	McGuirk Arena (1,491); Mount Pleasant, MI
January 20, 2026; 6:30 pm, ESPN+		Toledo	W 76–71	8–9 (2–5)	25 – Hill	10 – Eleko	6 – Cea	George Gervin GameAbove Center (1,105); Ypsilanti, MI
January 24, 2026; 1:00 pm, ESPN+		Northern Illinois	W 72–62	9–9 (3–5)	25 – Eleko	15 – Eleko	6 – Cea	George Gervin GameAbove Center (1,396); Ypsilanti, MI
January 28, 2026; 6:00 pm, ESPN+		at Buffalo	W 71–51	10–9 (4–5)	23 – Ovalle	15 – Eleko	12 – Cea	Alumni Arena (1,010); Amherst, NY
January 31, 2026; 2:00 pm, ESPN+		Western Michigan	L 54–59	10–10 (4–6)	18 – Hill	10 – Hill	4 – Cea	George Gervin GameAbove Center (1,450); Ypsilanti, MI
February 4, 2026; 6:00 pm, ESPN+		at UMass	L 60–75	10–11 (4–7)	22 – Hill	10 – Eleko	11 – Cea	Mullins Center (1,020); Amherst, MA
February 7, 2026*; 2:00 pm, ESPN+		Arkansas State; MAC-SBC Challenge	W 76–73 ^{OT}	11–11	27 – Hill	15 – Eleko	8 – Cea	George Gervin GameAbove Center (1,086); Ypsilanti, MI
February 10, 2026; 6:30 pm, ESPN+		Ball State	L 68–83	11–12 (4–8)	20 – Hill	13 – Eleko	4 – Cea	George Gervin GameAbove Center (1,103); Ypsilanti, MI
February 14, 2026; 2:00 pm, ESPN+		at Toledo	L 51–62	11–13 (4–9)	23 – Eleko	12 – Eleko	5 – Cea	Savage Arena (4,315); Toledo, OH
February 21, 2026; 2:00 pm, ESPN+		Buffalo	W 73–63	12–13 (5–9)	23 – Eleko	5 – Tied	7 – Cea	George Gervin GameAbove Center (1,273); Ypsilanti, MI
February 25, 2026; 6:30 pm, ESPN+		Miami (OH)	L 60–78	12–14 (5–10)	21 – Ovalle	6 – Eleko	4 – Tied	George Gervin GameAbove Center (1,167); Ypsilanti, MI
February 28, 2026; 2:00 pm, ESPN+		at Northern Illinois	L 61–70	12–15 (5–11)	20 – Eleko	10 – Eleko	6 – Cea	NIU Convocation Center (1,273); DeKalb, IL
March 4, 2026; 6:30 pm, ESPN+		Ohio	L 54–62	12–16 (5–12)	12 – Eleko	7 – Thrash	2 – Tied	George Gervin GameAbove Center (1,452); Ypsilanti, MI
March 7, 2026; 12:00 pm, ESPN+		at Akron	W 77–62	13–16 (6–12)	24 – Hill	13 – Eleko	6 – Cea	James A. Rhodes Arena (708); Akron, OH
*Non-conference game. ^{#}Rankings from AP Poll. (#) Tournament seedings in parentheses. All times are in Eastern.
