= 2025–26 Central Michigan Chippewas women's basketball team =

American college basketball season

2025–26 Central Michigan Chippewas women's basketball
- Conference: Mid-American Conference
- Record: 18–12 (12–6 MAC)
- Head coach: Kristin Haynie (3rd season)
- Associate head coach: Chelsie Butler
- Assistant coaches: Jenna Allen; Jordan Walker; Rana El-Husseini
- Home arena: McGuirk Arena

2025–26 Mid-American Conference women's basketball standings
	Conf.				Overall
Team	W		L	PCT	W		L	PCT
Miami (OH) †	16	–	2	.889	28	–	7	.800
Ball State	16	–	2	.889	26	–	7	.788
UMass	15	–	3	.833	23	–	7	.767
Central Michigan	12	–	6	.667	18	–	12	.600
Ohio	11	–	7	.611	18	–	14	.563
Toledo	9	–	9	.500	17	–	15	.531
Bowling Green	9	–	9	.500	17	–	14	.548
Kent State	9	–	9	.500	15	–	16	.484
Eastern Michigan	6	–	12	.333	13	–	16	.448
Western Michigan	5	–	13	.278	9	–	20	.310
Akron	4	–	14	.222	7	–	24	.226
Northern Illinois	4	–	14	.222	7	–	23	.233
Buffalo	1	–	17	.056	3	–	27	.100
† 2026 MAC tournament winner

The 2025–26 Central Michigan Chippewas women's basketball team represented Central Michigan University during the 2025–26 NCAA Division I women's basketball season. The Chippewas, led by third-year head coach Kristin Haynie, played their home games at McGuirk Arena in Mount Pleasant, Michigan as members of the Mid-American Conference.

== Previous season ==
The Chippewas finished the 2024–25 season 14–17, 9–9 in MAC play, to finish in seventh place. They were defeated by eventual tournament runner-up Toledo in the quarterfinals of the MAC tournament.

== Preseason ==
On October 21, 2025, the Mid-American Conference released their preseason poll. Central Michigan was picked to finish fifth in the conference.

=== Preseason rankings ===
MAC Preseason Poll
Place	Team	Votes
1	Kent State	133 (5)
2	Toledo	118 (2)
3	UMass	115 (3)
4	Ball State	112 (3)
5	Central Michigan	105
6	Bowling Green	101
7	Miami	86
8	Akron	51
9	Western Michigan	48
10	Ohio	44
11	Buffalo	42
12	Eastern Michigan	36
13	Northern Illinois	23
(#) first-place votes

=== Tournament Champions ===
MAC Tournament Champions
Team	Votes
Kent State	5
UMass	3
Toledo	3
Ball State	1
Miami	1

=== Preseason All-MAC Teams ===
Preseason All-MAC Teams
Team	Player	Year
First	Madi Morson	Sophomore
Second	Ayanna-Sarai Darrington	Sophomore

== Roster ==
2025–26 Central Michigan Chippewas women's basketball team
Players
Coaches

Pos.	#	Name	Height	Year	Previous school	Hometown
G	0	Madi Morson	5 ft 8 in (1.73 m)	So	Salem High School	Canton, Michigan
G	1	Mayla Ham	5 ft 11 in (1.8 m)	Jr	Georgetown	Detroit, Michigan
G	2	Lilah Turnbull	5 ft 7 in (1.7 m)	Fr	Western Reserve Academy	Pittsburgh, Pennsylvania
C	3	Kara Bartels	6 ft 3 in (1.91 m)	Jr	Lansing Community College	West Olive, Michigan
G	4	Sarah Brown	5 ft 9 in (1.75 m)	RS Fr	China Spring High School	Waco, Texas
G	10	Rylan Buschell	5 ft 6 in (1.68 m)	Fr	Belleville High School	Belleville, Michigan
F	11	Nekhu Mitchell	6 ft 0 in (1.83 m)	Sr	George Mason	Baltimore, Maryland
F	12	Riley Smith	6 ft 2 in (1.88 m)	So	Archbishop Alter High School	Miamisburg, Ohio
F	21	Zareia Chevre (5th)	5 ft 10 in (1.78 m)	Sr	Governors State	Saint Paul, Minnesota
F	23	Demetria Prewitt	5 ft 10 in (1.78 m)	Sr	Kirkwood Community College	Madison, Wisconsin
G	24	Taylor Anderson	5 ft 10 in (1.78 m)	Sr	South Lyon East High School	South Lyon, Michigan
F	25	Ayanna-Sarai Darrington	6 ft 2 in (1.88 m)	So	Frederick Douglass High School	Lexington, Kentucky
G	30	Jayda Mosley	5 ft 7 in (1.7 m)	So	Purcell Marian High School	Cincinnati, Ohio
C	40	Taylor Johnson	6 ft 3 in (1.91 m)	Jr	College of Southern Idaho	Cannon Falls, Minnesota

Head coach

- Kristin Haynie (Michigan State)

Assistant coach(es)

- Chelsie Butler (Marquette)
- Jenna Allen (Michigan State)
- Jordan Walker (Tennessee)
- Rana El-Husseini (Buffalo)

Legend

- (C) Team captain
- (S) Suspended
- (I) Ineligible
- (W) Walk-on
- (5th) Fifth-year senior
- Injured
- Current redshirt

Roster
Last update: July 4, 2026

== Schedule and results ==
Date time, TV	Rank^{#}	Opponent^{#}	Result	Record	High points	High rebounds	High assists	Site (attendance) city, state
Exhibition
October 28, 2025*; 6:30 pm		Schoolcraft	W 97–44	–	–	–	–	McGuirk Arena; Mount Pleasant, MI
Regular season
November 3, 2025*; 6:00 pm, ESPN+		at Georgia Southern; MAC-SBC Challenge	L 72–98	0–1	31 – Morson	8 – Anderson	3 – Buschell	Hill Convocation Center (852); Statesboro, GA
November 9, 2025*; 1:00 pm, ESPN+		Davenport	W 71–44	1–1	15 – Darrington	11 – Darrington	3 – Tied	McGuirk Arena (1,040); Mount Pleasant, MI
November 12, 2025*; 7:00 pm, ESPN+		at Butler	W 68–59	2–1	14 – Morson	7 – Mitchell	4 – Chevre	Hinkle Fieldhouse (783); Indianapolis, IN
November 19, 2025*; 7:00 pm, ESPN+		at Detroit Mercy	W 87–54	3–1	21 – Morson	9 – Prewitt	6 – Mitchell	Calihan Hall (461); Detroit, MI
November 22, 2025*; 1:00 pm, ESPN+		Eastern Illinois	W 60−54	4−1	17 – Tied	7 – Tied	3 – Tied	McGuirk Arena (1,101); Mount Pleasant, MI
November 24, 2025*; 9:00 pm, ACCN		at No. 19 Notre Dame	L 51−83	4−2	15 – Morson	6 – Morson	2 – Tied	Purcell Pavilion (6,387); Notre Dame, IN
November 30, 2025*; 1:00 pm, ESPN+		Purdue	W 57–55	5–2	16 – Darrington	13 – Anderson	3 – Tied	McGuirk Arena (1,013); Mount Pleasant, MI
December 3, 2025*; 7:00 pm, B1G+		at No. 6 Michigan	L 40–82	5–3	11 – Darrington	5 – Tied	3 – Turnbull	Crisler Center (2,773); Ann Arbor, MI
December 7, 2025*; 12:00 pm, SECN+		at No. 17 Kentucky	L 55–82	5–4	12 – Morson	5 – Tied	2 – Tied	Memorial Coliseum (4,290); Lexington, KY
December 17, 2025*; 7:00 pm, ESPN+		at Valparaiso	W 91–41	6–4	22 – Darrington	14 – Anderson	5 – Buschell	Athletics–Recreation Center (209); Valparaiso, IN
December 20, 2025; 1:00 pm, ESPN+		Northern Illinois	W 89–51	7–4 (1–0)	26 – Morson	17 – Anderson	7 – Mitchell	McGuirk Arena (1,302); Mount Pleasant, MI
December 31, 2025; 1:00 pm, ESPN+		Ohio	L 83−85 ^{OT}	7−5 (1–1)	27 – Darrington	21 – Darrington	7 – Anderson	McGuirk Arena (1,414); Mount Pleasant, MI
January 3, 2026; 2:00 pm, ESPN+		at Bowling Green	W 68–56	8–5 (2–1)	22 – Morson	6 – Tied	4 – Mitchell	Stroh Center (1,790); Bowling Green, OH
January 7, 2026; 11:00 am, ESPN+		Kent State	W 66–57	9–5 (3–1)	18 – Tied	12 – Anderson	5 – Anderson	McGuirk Arena (2,312); Mount Pleasant, MI
January 10, 2026; 1:00 pm, ESPN+		at UMass	L 72–74	9–6 (3–2)	27 – Morson	10 – Darrington	6 – Turnbull	Mullins Center (1,739); Amherst, MA
January 17, 2026; 1:00 pm, ESPN+		Eastern Michigan	W 77–64	10–6 (4–2)	24 – Morson	10 – Tied	4 – Tied	McGuirk Arena (1,491); Mount Pleasant, MI
January 21, 2026; 6:00 pm, ESPN+		at Akron	W 74–53	11–6 (5–2)	23 – Morson	11 – Anderson	3 – Tied	James A. Rhodes Arena (893); Akron, OH
January 24, 2026; 3:30 pm, ESPN+		at Western Michigan	W 64–44	12–6 (6–2)	16 – Tied	18 – Anderson	2 – Buschell	University Arena (1,547); Kalamazoo, MI
January 28, 2026; 6:30 pm, ESPN+		Ball State	L 70–76	12–7 (6–3)	27 – Morson	9 – Darrington	5 – Chevre	McGuirk Arena (1,353); Mount Pleasant, MI
January 31, 2026; 3:00 pm, ESPN+		at Northern Illinois	W 75–70	13–7 (7–3)	26 – Morson	11 – Darrington	4 – Tied	NIU Convocation Center (946); DeKalb, IL
February 4, 2026; 11:00 am, ESPN+		at Buffalo	W 90–59	14–7 (8–3)	23 – Morson	17 – Anderson	6 – Turnbull	Alumni Arena (5,778); Amherst, NY
February 7, 2026*; 1:00 pm, ESPN+		Marshall; MAC-SBC Challenge	L 81–88	14–8	27 – Morson	15 – Anderson	8 – Anderson	McGuirk Arena (1,306); Mount Pleasant, MI
February 11, 2026; 6:30 pm, ESPN+		Akron	W 86–79	15–8 (9–3)	29 – Morson	10 – Anderson	4 – Tied	McGuirk Arena (1,191); Mount Pleasant, MI
February 14, 2026; 1:00 pm, ESPN+		Western Michigan	W 70–67	16–8 (10–3)	25 – Morson	8 – Anderson	5 – Anderson	McGuirk Arena (1,616); Mount Pleasant, MI
February 18, 2026; 7:00 pm, ESPN+		at Miami (OH)	L 53–65	16–9 (10–4)	17 – Morson	14 – Anderson	2 – Buschell	Millett Hall (517); Oxford, OH
February 21, 2026; 1:00 pm, ESPN+		UMass	L 50–69	16–10 (10–5)	16 – Morson	14 – Anderson	2 – Tied	McGuirk Arena (1,802); Mount Pleasant, MI
February 25, 2026; 7:00 pm, ESPN+		at Toledo	W 68–64	17–10 (11–5)	20 – Darrington	14 – Anderson	6 – Anderson	Savage Arena (3,974); Toledo, OH
February 28, 2026; 1:00 pm, BoxCast		at Kent State	L 56–63	17–11 (11–6)	19 – Morson	12 – Darrington	2 – Tied	MAC Center (1,297); Kent, OH
March 4, 2026; 6:30 pm, ESPN+		Bowling Green	W 77–65	18–11 (12–6)	29 – Morson	10 – Anderson	4 – Morson	McGuirk Arena (1,784); Mount Pleasant, MI
MAC tournament
March 11, 2026; 1:45 pm, ESPN+	(4)	vs. (5) Ohio; Quarterfinals	L 88–89	18–12	23 – Morson	12 – Anderson	4 – Prewitt	Rocket Arena; Cleveland, OH
*Non-conference game. ^{#}Rankings from AP Poll. (#) Tournament seedings in parentheses. All times are in Eastern.
