= 2025–26 Akron Zips women's basketball team =

American college basketball season

2025–26 Akron Zips women's basketball
- Conference: Mid-American Conference
- Record: 7–24 (4–14 MAC)
- Head coach: Ryan Gensler (3rd season)
- Assistant coaches: Jessica Jenkins; Sarah Jones
- Home arena: James A. Rhodes Arena

2025–26 Mid-American Conference women's basketball standings
	Conf.				Overall
Team	W		L	PCT	W		L	PCT
Miami (OH) †	16	–	2	.889	28	–	7	.800
Ball State	16	–	2	.889	26	–	7	.788
UMass	15	–	3	.833	23	–	7	.767
Central Michigan	12	–	6	.667	18	–	12	.600
Ohio	11	–	7	.611	18	–	14	.563
Toledo	9	–	9	.500	17	–	15	.531
Bowling Green	9	–	9	.500	17	–	14	.548
Kent State	9	–	9	.500	15	–	16	.484
Eastern Michigan	6	–	12	.333	13	–	16	.448
Western Michigan	5	–	13	.278	9	–	20	.310
Akron	4	–	14	.222	7	–	24	.226
Northern Illinois	4	–	14	.222	7	–	23	.233
Buffalo	1	–	17	.056	3	–	27	.100
† 2026 MAC tournament winner

The 2025–26 Akron Zips women's basketball team represented the University of Akron during the 2025–26 NCAA Division I women's basketball season. The Zips, led by third-year head coach Ryan Gensler, played their home games at the James A. Rhodes Arena in Akron, Ohio as members of the Mid-American Conference.

== Previous season ==
The Zips finished the 2024–25 season 10–21, 4–14 in MAC play, to finish in a tie for tenth place. They failed to qualify for the MAC tournament, as only the top eight teams in the conference qualify.

== Preseason ==
On October 21, 2025, the Mid-American Conference released their preseason poll. Akron was picked to finish eighth in the conference.

=== Preseason rankings ===
MAC Preseason Poll
Place	Team	Votes
1	Kent State	133 (5)
2	Toledo	118 (2)
3	UMass	115 (3)
4	Ball State	112 (3)
5	Central Michigan	105
6	Bowling Green	101
7	Miami	86
8	Akron	51
9	Western Michigan	48
10	Ohio	44
11	Buffalo	42
12	Eastern Michigan	36
13	Northern Illinois	23
(#) first-place votes

=== Tournament Champions ===
MAC Tournament Champions
Team	Votes
Kent State	5
UMass	3
Toledo	3
Ball State	1
Miami	1

=== Preseason All-MAC Teams ===
No players were named to either Preseason All-MAC First or Second Teams.

== Roster ==
2025–26 Akron Zips women's basketball team
Players
Coaches

Pos.	#	Name	Height	Year	Previous school	Hometown
G	0	Kailee Bransford	5 ft 7 in (1.7 m)	Fr	Mount Notre Dame High School	Cincinnati, Ohio
G	1	Liz Murphy	5 ft 9 in (1.75 m)	So	Albury Wodonga Bandits	Yackandandah, Australia
G	4	Kam'Ren Rhodes	5 ft 6 in (1.68 m)	Sr	Illinois	Chandler, Arizona
G	5	Natalie Johnson	5 ft 8 in (1.73 m)	Sr	Saint Francis (PA)	Waldorf, Maryland
G	6	Izzy Callaway	5 ft 7 in (1.7 m)	So	Walsh	Copley, Ohio
G	8	Shaena Brew	5 ft 6 in (1.68 m)	Fr	Etiwanda High School	Rialto, California
G	10	Corinne Reed	5 ft 9 in (1.75 m)	Fr	St. Charles East High School	Chicago, Illinois
G	11	Maddie Vejsicky	6 ft 0 in (1.83 m)	Sr	San Diego	New Concord, Ohio
C	14	Liisa Taponen	6 ft 5 in (1.96 m)	Sr	Illinois	Tampere, Finland
G/F	20	Keiryn McGuff	6 ft 0 in (1.83 m)	Jr	Bowling Green	Dublin, Ohio
G	22	Teniesha Clarke	5 ft 9 in (1.75 m)	Jr	Niagara Prep	Burlington, Ontario
G	24	Ella Wigal	6 ft 0 in (1.83 m)	Jr	Liberty	Granville, Ohio
F	33	Ni'Rah Clark	6 ft 2 in (1.88 m)	So	Rogers High School	Toledo, Ohio
G/F	35	Monique Mitchell	5 ft 11 in (1.8 m)	Fr	Washington High School	South Bend, Indiana

Head coach

- Ryan Gensler (Saint Joseph's)

Assistant coach(es)

- Jessica Jenkins (St. Bonaventure)
- Sarah Jones (Villanova)

Legend

- (C) Team captain
- (S) Suspended
- (I) Ineligible
- (W) Walk-on
- Injured
- Current redshirt

Roster
Last update: July 16, 2026

== Schedule and results ==
Date time, TV	Rank^{#}	Opponent^{#}	Result	Record	High points	High rebounds	High assists	Site (attendance) city, state
Regular season
November 3, 2025*; 8:00 pm, ESPN+		at South Alabama; MAC-SBC Challenge	L 63–87	0–1	21 – Mitchell	5 – Tied	5 – Brew	Mitchell Center (310); Mobile, AL
November 7, 2025*; 6:00 pm, ESPN+		at Robert Morris	L 61–70	0–2	22 – Clark	7 – Clark	4 – Callaway	UPMC Events Center (922); Moon Township, PA
November 12, 2025*; 7:00 pm, ACCNX		at No. 18 Notre Dame	L 58–85	0–3	13 – Clark	6 – McGuff	3 – Tied	Purcell Pavilion (6,255); Notre Dame, IN
November 16, 2025*; 2:00 pm, ESPN+		at Cleveland State	L 55–76	0–4	15 – McGuff	6 – Tied	4 – Brew	Wolstein Center (303); Cleveland, OH
November 20, 2025*; 6:00 pm, ESPN+		Binghamton	L 94−95 ^{2OT}	0−5	19 – Clark	14 – Clark	7 – Brew	James A. Rhodes Arena (807); Akron, OH
November 24, 2025*; 6:00 pm, ESPN+		Xavier	L 57−64	0−6	14 – Brew	8 – Tied	3 – Tied	James A. Rhodes Arena (800); Akron, OH
November 30, 2025*; 12:00 pm, ESPN+		Youngstown State	L 63–90	0–7	11 – Tied	7 – Vejsicky	3 – Reed	James A. Rhodes Arena (954); Akron, OH
December 3, 2025*; 11:00 am, ESPN+		Heidelberg	W 117–34	1–7	36 – Callaway	10 – Brew	7 – Brew	James A. Rhodes Arena (1,014); Akron, OH
December 13, 2025*; 12:00 pm, B1G+		at No. 6 Michigan	L 59–85	1–8	13 – Brew	4 – Tied	5 – Brew	Crisler Center (3,495); Ann Arbor, MI
December 16, 2025*; 6:00 pm		Geneva	W 100–65	2–8	21 – Clark	11 – Tied	3 – Tied	James A. Rhodes Arena (693); Akron, OH
December 20, 2025*; 2:00 pm, ESPN+		vs. Delaware; Hawk Classic	L 56–75	2–9	16 – Clark	6 – Clark	3 – Reed	Hagan Arena (1,031); Philadelphia, PA
December 21, 2025*; 12:00 pm, ESPN+		vs. Le Moyne; Hawk Classic	W 94−68	3−9	20 – Tied	7 – Reed	5 – Tied	Hagan Arena; Philadelphia, PA
December 31, 2025; 12:00 pm, ESPN+		Ball State	L 73–102	3–10 (0–1)	15 – Mitchell	6 – Wigal	5 – Brew	James A. Rhodes Arena (846); Akron, OH
January 3, 2026; 1:00 pm, ESPN+		at Ohio	L 56–73	3–11 (0–2)	14 – Reed	9 – McGuff	5 – Reed	Convocation Center (513); Athens, OH
January 7, 2026; 7:00 pm, ESPN+		at Western Michigan	L 48–55	3–12 (0–3)	14 – Mitchell	12 – McGuff	3 – Brew	University Arena (632); Kalamazoo, MI
January 10, 2026; 12:00 pm, ESPN+		Miami (OH)	L 56–79	3–13 (0–4)	13 – McGuff	6 – Tied	3 – Tied	James A. Rhodes Arena (727); Akron, OH
January 14, 2026; 11:00 am, ESPN+		at UMass	L 68–82	3–14 (0–5)	25 – Clark	7 – Tied	6 – Brew	Mullins Center (5,121); Amherst, MA
January 17, 2026; 1:00 pm, ESPN+		at Kent State	L 79–91	3–15 (0–6)	22 – Clark	6 – Tied	4 – Rhodes	MAC Center (1,344); Kent, OH
January 21, 2026; 6:00 pm, ESPN+		Central Michigan	L 53–74	3–16 (0–7)	16 – Brew	6 – Tied	3 – Brew	James A. Rhodes Arena (893); Akron, OH
January 28, 2026; 7:00 pm, ESPN+		at Bowling Green	L 62–80	3–17 (0–8)	17 – Brew	6 – McGuff	3 – Tied	Stroh Center (1,326); Bowling Green, OH
January 31, 2026; 12:00 pm, ESPN+		Buffalo	W 76–72	4–17 (1–8)	20 – Brew	9 – McGuff	2 – Tied	James A. Rhodes Arena; Akron, OH
February 4, 2026; 6:00 pm, ESPN+		Toledo	W 77–74	5–17 (2–8)	19 – Clark	7 – Tied	9 – Brew	James A. Rhodes Arena (920); Akron, OH
February 7, 2026*; 12:00 pm, ESPN+		Louisiana; MAC-SBC Challenge	L 71–82	5–18	19 – Clark	8 – McGuff	7 – Brew	James A. Rhodes Arena (747); Akron, OH
February 11, 2026; 6:30 pm, ESPN+		at Central Michigan	L 79–86	5–19 (2–9)	26 – Brew	5 – Brew	4 – Brew	McGuirk Arena (1,191); Mount Pleasant, MI
February 14, 2026; 2:00 pm, ESPN+		at Northern Illinois	W 75–68 ^{OT}	6–19 (3–9)	21 – Clark	8 – McGuff	3 – Tied	NIU Convocation Center (740); DeKalb, IL
February 18, 2026; 6:00 pm, ESPN+		Ohio	W 108–105 ^{2OT}	7–19 (4–9)	22 – McGuff	11 – McGuff	12 – Brew	James A. Rhodes Arena (779); Akron, OH
February 21, 2026; 12:00 pm, ESPN+		Kent State	L 61–80	7–20 (4–10)	14 – Tied	5 – Tied	4 – Tied	James A. Rhodes Arena (1,093); Akron, OH
February 25, 2026; 6:30 pm, ESPN+		at Ball State	L 55–88	7–21 (4–11)	12 – McGuff	10 – McGuff	3 – Callaway	Worthen Arena (1,542); Muncie, IN
February 28, 2026; 1:00 pm, ESPN+		at Miami (OH)	L 56–74	7–22 (4–12)	15 – Murphy	6 – Brew	4 – Brew	Millett Hall (792); Oxford, OH
March 4, 2026; 6:00 pm, ESPN+		UMass	L 64–74	7–23 (4–13)	21 – Murphy	8 – Murphy	3 – Tied	James A. Rhodes Arena (738); Akron, OH
March 7, 2026; 12:00 pm, ESPN+		Eastern Michigan	L 62–77	7–24 (4–14)	15 – Murphy	11 – Johnson	3 – Brew	James A. Rhodes Arena (708); Akron, OH
*Non-conference game. ^{#}Rankings from AP Poll. (#) Tournament seedings in parentheses. All times are in Eastern.
