= 2025–26 Northern Illinois Huskies women's basketball team =

American college basketball season

2025–26 Northern Illinois Huskies women's basketball
- Conference: Mid-American Conference
- Record: 7–23 (4–14 MAC)
- Head coach: Jacey Brooks (1st season)
- Assistant coaches: E.C. Hill; Brittney Patrick; Audra Clark; Mark Schwitzgable; Ty Battle
- Home arena: NIU Convocation Center

2025–26 Mid-American Conference women's basketball standings
	Conf.				Overall
Team	W		L	PCT	W		L	PCT
Miami (OH) †	16	–	2	.889	28	–	7	.800
Ball State	16	–	2	.889	26	–	7	.788
UMass	15	–	3	.833	23	–	7	.767
Central Michigan	12	–	6	.667	18	–	12	.600
Ohio	11	–	7	.611	18	–	14	.563
Toledo	9	–	9	.500	17	–	15	.531
Bowling Green	9	–	9	.500	17	–	14	.548
Kent State	9	–	9	.500	15	–	16	.484
Eastern Michigan	6	–	12	.333	13	–	16	.448
Western Michigan	5	–	13	.278	9	–	20	.310
Akron	4	–	14	.222	7	–	24	.226
Northern Illinois	4	–	14	.222	7	–	23	.233
Buffalo	1	–	17	.056	3	–	27	.100
† 2026 MAC tournament winner

The 2025–26 Northern Illinois Huskies women's basketball team represented Northern Illinois University during the 2025–26 NCAA Division I women's basketball season. The Huskies, led by first-year head coach Jacey Brooks, played their home games at the NIU Convocation Center in DeKalb, Illinois as members of the Mid-American Conference.

== Previous season ==
The Huskies finished the 2024–25 season 13–17, 6–12 in MAC play, to finish in ninth place. They failed to qualify for the MAC tournament, as only the top eight teams in the conference qualify.

Following the season, on March 10, 2025, head coach Lisa Carlsen announced her resignation, ending her 10-year tenure with the team. On April 1, the school announced that they would be hiring Buffalo associate head coach Jacey Brooks as Carlsen's successor.

== Preseason ==
On October 21, 2025, the Mid-American Conference released their preseason poll. Northern Illinois was picked to finish 13th (last) in the conference.

=== Preseason rankings ===
MAC Preseason Poll
Place	Team	Votes
1	Kent State	133 (5)
2	Toledo	118 (2)
3	UMass	115 (3)
4	Ball State	112 (3)
5	Central Michigan	105
6	Bowling Green	101
7	Miami	86
8	Akron	51
9	Western Michigan	48
10	Ohio	44
11	Buffalo	42
12	Eastern Michigan	36
13	Northern Illinois	23
(#) first-place votes

=== Tournament Champions ===
MAC Tournament Champions
Team	Votes
Kent State	5
UMass	3
Toledo	3
Ball State	1
Miami	1

=== Preseason All-MAC Teams ===
No players were named to either Preseason All-MAC First or Second Teams.

== Roster ==
2025–26 Northern Illinois Huskies women's basketball team
Players
Coaches

Pos.	#	Name	Height	Year	Previous school	Hometown
F	1	Teresa Mbemba	6 ft 0 in (1.83 m)	Sr	Presbyterian	Benguela, Angola
G	2	Nadechka Laccen	5 ft 6 in (1.68 m)	GS	St. Bonaventure	San Juan, Puerto Rico
G	3	Julia Sollberger	5 ft 8 in (1.73 m)	So	Dunlap High School	Peoria, Illinois
G	4	Makenzie Brass	5 ft 9 in (1.75 m)	RS Fr	Minooka High School	Minooka, Illinois
G	5	Sa'Mahn Johnson	5 ft 7 in (1.7 m)	Fr	Reynoldsburg High School	Columbus, Ohio
F	6	Juliana Haddad	5 ft 10 in (1.78 m)	So	Eastern Florida State College	Espoo, Finland
G	7	Maria Serracanta	6 ft 0 in (1.83 m)	Sr	Mercer	Sabadell, Spain
F	8	Nevaeh Wingate	6 ft 0 in (1.83 m)	Jr	St. John's	Liverpool, New York
G	12	Cyra Conwell	5 ft 5 in (1.65 m)	Fr	Butler College Prep	Chicago, Illinois
G	14	Emilie Sorensen	5 ft 9 in (1.75 m)	Fr	Waukee High School	Waukee, Iowa
F	21	Marta Hermoso	6 ft 2 in (1.88 m)	Sr	McNeese	Seville, Spain
G	22	Alecia Doyle	5 ft 8 in (1.73 m)	Sr	Southeast Missouri State	Carterville, Illinois
F	23	Reagan Barkema	5 ft 11 in (1.8 m)	Sr	Bradley	Story City, Iowa
G	25	Lexi Kerstein	5 ft 6 in (1.68 m)	So	Vermont	Riverwoods, Illinois
G	32	Lily Taylor	5 ft 9 in (1.75 m)	Fr	Example Academy	Chicago, Illinois

Head coach

- Jacey Brooks (Canisius)

Assistant coach(es)

- E.C. Hill (Northern Illinois)
- Brittney Patrick (Southern Illinois)
- Audra Clark (St. Catherine)
- Mark Schwitzgable (Ohio)
- Ty Battle (Delaware)

Legend

- (C) Team captain
- (S) Suspended
- (I) Ineligible
- (W) Walk-on
- Injured
- Current redshirt

Roster
Last update: July 17, 2026

== Schedule and results ==
Date time, TV	Rank^{#}	Opponent^{#}	Result	Record	High points	High rebounds	High assists	Site (attendance) city, state
Exhibition
October 29, 2025*; 6:00 pm		Benedictine	W 74–47	–	19 – Wingate	9 – Wingate	5 – Laccen	NIU Convocation Center (549); DeKalb, IL
Regular season
November 3, 2025*; 6:00 pm, ESPN+		at Southern Miss; MAC-SBC Challenge	L 56–77	0–1	17 – Wingate	8 – Mbemba	4 – Wingate	Reed Green Coliseum (1,620); Hattiesburg, MS
November 7, 2025*; 7:00 pm, ESPN+		Milwaukee	L 65–76	0–2	26 – Laccen	6 – Serracanta	3 – Tied	NIU Convocation Center (380); DeKalb, IL
November 11, 2025*; 6:00 pm, ESPN+		Western Illinois	L 50–68	0–3	17 – Sorensen	4 – Tied	2 – Tied	NIU Convocation Center (313); DeKalb, IL
November 13, 2025*; 7:00 pm, ESPN+		at UIC	L 55–66	0–4	23 – Wingate	7 – Tied	3 – Serracanta	Credit Union 1 Arena (513); Chicago, IL
November 21, 2025*; 6:00 pm, ESPN+		at SIU Edwardsville	W 49–30	1–4	17 – Laccen	12 – Wingate	3 – Serracanta	First Community Arena (1,347); Edwardsville, IL
November 24, 2025*; 6:00 pm, ESPN+		Chicago State	W 67−57	2−4	19 – Mbemba	11 – Wingate	3 – Wingate	NIU Convocation Center (558); DeKalb, IL
November 30, 2025*; 3:00 pm, ESPN+		at Evansville	L 52−65	2−5	12 – Tied	6 – Tied	3 – Serracanta	Meeks Family Fieldhouse (516); Evansville, IN
December 3, 2025*; 6:00 pm, ESPN+		at Indiana State	L 61–69	2–6	19 – Johnson	9 – Serracanta	6 – Serracanta	Hulman Center (1,142); Terre Haute, IN
December 7, 2025*; 1:00 pm, ESPN+		at No. 10 Iowa State	L 52–105	2–7	16 – Tied	5 – Haddad	2 – Tied	Hilton Coliseum (9,538); Ames, IA
December 14, 2025*; 1:00 pm, ESPN+		at Purdue Fort Wayne	L 44–67	2–8	17 – Sorensen	7 – Serracanta	2 – Tied	Memorial Coliseum (2,383); Fort Wayne, IN
December 20, 2025; 12:00 pm, ESPN+		at Central Michigan	L 51–89	2–9 (0–1)	10 – Wingate	5 – Sorensen	4 – Serracanta	McGuirk Arena (1,302); Mount Pleasant, MI
December 29, 2025*; 2:00 pm, SLN		at St. Thomas	L 46–64	2–10	17 – Wingate	7 – Wingate	5 – Serracanta	Lee & Penny Anderson Arena (318); St. Paul, MN
January 3, 2026; 2:00 pm, ESPN+		Ball State	L 56−74	2−11 (0–2)	13 – Tied	5 – Wingate	5 – Serracanta	NIU Convocation Center (1,027); DeKalb, IL
January 7, 2026; 5:00 pm, ESPN+		at Buffalo	W 64–58	3–11 (1–2)	20 – Sorensen	7 – Tied	6 – Serracanta	Alumni Arena (1,380); Amherst, NY
January 10, 2026; 2:00 pm, ESPN+		Bowling Green	L 48–65	3–12 (1–3)	15 – Mbemba	8 – Conwell	3 – Tied	NIU Convocation Center (881); DeKalb, IL
January 14, 2026; 6:00 pm, ESPN+		at Toledo	L 49–70	3–13 (1–4)	15 – Wingate	8 – Wingate	3 – Serracanta	Savage Arena (3,471); Toledo, OH
January 17, 2026; 12:00 pm, ESPN+		at Ohio	L 62–66	3–14 (1–5)	16 – Johnson	13 – Mbemba	7 – Laccen	Convocation Center (661); Athens, OH
January 21, 2026; 6:00 pm, ESPN+		Western Michigan	W 64–56	4–14 (2–5)	22 – Sorensen	8 – Tied	7 – Wingate	NIU Convocation Center (570); DeKalb, IL
January 24, 2026; 12:00 pm, ESPN+		at Eastern Michigan	L 62–72	4–15 (2–6)	18 – Laccen	9 – Wingate	3 – Serracanta	George Gervin GameAbove Center (1,396); Ypsilanti, MI
January 28, 2026; 11:00 am, ESPN+		Miami (OH)	L 43–71	4–16 (2–7)	11 – Laccen	5 – Serracanta	1 – Tied	NIU Convocation Center (1,622); DeKalb, IL
January 31, 2026; 2:00 pm, ESPN+		Central Michigan	L 70–75	4–17 (2–8)	18 – Sorensen	3 – Tied	6 – Serracanta	NIU Convocation Center (946); DeKalb, IL
February 4, 2026; 5:30 pm, ESPN+		at Ball State	L 48–83	4–18 (2–9)	12 – Wingate	7 – Laccen	4 – Serracanta	Worthen Arena (1,418); Muncie, IN
February 7, 2026*; 1:00 pm, ESPN+		Texas State; MAC-SBC Challenge	W 71–69	5–18	21 – Tied	6 – Wingate	7 – Serracanta	NIU Convocation Center (485); DeKalb, IL
February 10, 2026; 6:00 pm, ESPN+		UMass	L 54–75	5–19 (2–10)	15 – Wingate	5 – Wingate	3 – Tied	NIU Convocation Center (256); DeKalb, IL
February 14, 2026; 1:00 pm, ESPN+		Akron	L 68–75 ^{OT}	5–20 (2–11)	22 – Wingate	9 – Serracanta	4 – Tied	NIU Convocation Center (740); DeKalb, IL
February 18, 2026; 6:00 pm, ESPN+		at Kent State	L 67–70	5–21 (2–12)	17 – Tied	5 – Tied	3 – Tied	MAC Center (1,274); Kent, OH
February 21, 2026; 12:00 pm, ESPN+		at Western Michigan	L 60–65	5–22 (2–13)	14 – Tied	9 – Sorensen	4 – Tied	University Arena (829); Kalamazoo, MI
February 28, 2026; 1:00 pm, ESPN+		Eastern Michigan	W 70–61	6–22 (3–13)	21 – Wingate	6 – Sorensen	11 – Serracanta	NIU Convocation Center (1,273); DeKalb, IL
March 4, 2026; 6:00 pm, ESPN+		Buffalo	W 56–53	7–22 (4–13)	27 – Wingate	7 – Wingate	9 – Serracanta	NIU Convocation Center (431); DeKalb, IL
March 7, 2026; 1:00 pm, ESPN+		at Bowling Green	L 66–77	7–23 (4–14)	21 – Wingate	9 – Wingate	5 – Serracanta	Stroh Center (1,987); Bowling Green, OH
*Non-conference game. ^{#}Rankings from AP Poll. (#) Tournament seedings in parentheses. All times are in Central.
