= Glenn Box =

American basketball player and coach

Current position
- Title: Head coach
- Team: Miami (OH)
- Conference: MAC
- Record: 61–39 (.610)
- Annual salary: $460,000

Biographical details
- Born: February 2, 1975 (age 51)
- Education: Southeast Missouri State University

Coaching career (HC unless noted)
- 2002–2005: Rend Lake College (men's asst.)
- 2005–2008: Rend Lake College
- 2008–2010: Western Michigan (asst.)
- 2010–2012: Saint Louis (asst.)
- 2012–2014: Akron (asst.)
- 2014–2016: Saint Louis (asst.)
- 2016–2019: Indiana (asst.)
- 2019–2023: Indiana (assoc. HC)
- 2023–present: Miami (OH)

Head coaching record
- Overall: 125–70 (.641)

Accomplishments and honors

Championships
- MAC regular season (2026); MAC tournament (2026)

Awards
- MAC Coach of the Year (2026)

Glenn Box (born February 2, 1975) is an American basketball coach who is the women's basketball head coach at Miami University.

== Coaching career ==
Box began his collegiate coaching career in 2002 at Rend Lake College as an assistant for the men's basketball team for three seasons before taking over as head coach for Rend Lake's women's basketball program from 2005 to 2008. At Rend Lake he compiled a 64–31 overall record as a head coach.

In 2008, Box began a career as an assistant coach in NCAA Division I women's basketball with his first stint in the MAC where he was an assistant coach at Western Michigan for two seasons. In 2010 he started his first stint as an assistant at Saint Louis which lasted two seasons before he moved back to the MAC with Akron for two seasons under Jodi Kest. In 2014 he returned to Saint Louis, now under Lisa Stone, where in his second of two seasons he helped the Billikens to 26 wins and a share of the Atlantic 10 championship.

In 2016, Box took a position as an assistant at Indiana under head coach Teri Moren. In 2018 the Hoosiers won the WNIT championship. He helped take to the Hoosiers to NCAA tournaments in 2019, 2021 and 2022 before a Big Ten championship and an NCAA tournament top seed in 2023.

=== Miami (Ohio) ===
On May 8, 2023, Box returned to the MAC, this time as a head coach, when he was announced as the tenth head coach for Miami RedHawks women's basketball His team shared the MAC regular season championship in the 2025–26 season. Following the regular season, Box won the 2025-26 MAC Women’s Basketball Coach of the Year award. The RedHawks won the 2026 MAC tournament, their first since 2008, to advance to the 2026 NCAA tournament.

== Personal life ==
Box is from Cairo, Illinois, where he coached locally before moving to the collegiate ranks. He has an associate degree in elementary education from Rend Lake College and a bachelor's degree in criminal justice from Southeast Missouri State University.

Box and his wife Leah have four children named Darius, William, Auna and Bella.

== Head coaching record ==
Record table
| Season | Team | Overall | Conference | Standing | Postseason |
|---|---|---|---|---|---|
Rend Lake Lady Warriors (NJCAA) (2005–2008)
| 2005–06 | Rend Lake | 19–12 | | | |
| 2006–07 | Rend Lake | 24–8 | | | |
| 2007–08 | Rend Lake | 21–11 | | | |
| Rend Lake: | | 64–31 (.674) | | | |
Miami RedHawks (Mid-American Conference) (2023–present)
| 2023–24 | Miami (OH) | 9–20 | 6–12 | T–9th | |
| 2024–25 | Miami (OH) | 19–12 | 11–7 | T–5th | WNIT Second Round |
| 2025–26 | Miami (OH) | 28–7 | 16–2 | T–1st | NCAA Division I First Round |
| 2026–27 | Miami (OH) | 5–0 | 0–0 | | |
| Miami: | | 61–39 (.610) | 33–21 (.611) | | |
| Total: | | 125–70 (.641) | | | |
National champion Postseason invitational champion Conference regular season champion Conference regular season and conference tournament champion Division regular season champion Division regular season and conference tournament champion Conference tournament champion
