= Mike Leflar =

American basketball player and coach

Current position
- Title: Head coach
- Team: UMass
- Conference: MAC
- Record: 45–49 (.479)

Biographical details
- Education: Boston College

Coaching career (HC unless noted)
- 2003–2004: Penn (asst.)
- 2004–2012: Boston (asst.)
- 2012–2014: Boston (assoc. HC)
- 2014–2015: Binghamton (assoc. HC)
- 2015–2017: Northeastern (asst.)
- 2017–2018: Northeastern (assoc. HC)
- 2018–2021: UMass (asst.)
- 2021–2023: UMass (assoc. HC)
- 2023–present: UMass

Head coaching record
- Overall: 45–49 (.479)

Mike Leflar is an American women's basketball coach who is currently the women's basketball head coach at the University of Massachusetts.

== Early life and education ==
Leflar is from Horsham, Pennsylvania. In 2002 he earned a bachelor’s degree in communications from Boston College.

== Coaching career ==
Before coming to UMass, he served as an assistant women's basketball coach at Penn, Boston, Binghamton, and Northeastern.

=== UMass ===
In 2018 he was hired as an assistant under Tory Verdi. He was promoted to associate head coach in 2021. After Verdi accepted the head coaching position at Pittsburgh, he was promoted to head coach on April 10, 2023. Through his first two seasons he has an overall record of 22–42.

== Head coaching record ==
Record table
Season	Team	Overall	Conference	Standing	Postseason
Atlantic 10 (Atlantic 10 Conference) (2023–2025)
2023–24	UMass	5–27	2–16	14th	
2024–25	UMass	17–15	11–7	7th	
UMass (A10):		22–42 (.344)	13–23 (.361)		
UMass (Mid-American Conference) (2025-–present)
2025–26	UMass	23–7	15–3	3rd	
UMass (MAC):		23–7 (.767)	15–3 (.833)		
UMass:		45–49 (.479)	28–26 (.519)		
Total:		45–49 (.479)			
National champion Postseason invitational champion Conference regular season champion Conference regular season and conference tournament champion Division regular season champion Division regular season and conference tournament champion Conference tournament champion

== Personal life ==
He is married to his wife Kate. They have two sons, Graham and Jackson.
