= Miami RedHawks women's basketball =

Women's basketball team for Miami University

2026–27 Miami RedHawks women's basketball team
- University: Miami University
- Athletic director: David Sayler
- Head coach: Glenn Box (4th season)
- Location: Oxford, Ohio
- Arena: Millett Hall (capacity: 6,400)
- Conference: Mid-American
- Nickname: Redhawks
- Colors: Red and white

NCAA Division I tournament appearances
- 2008, 2026

AIAW tournament appearances
- 1982

Conference tournament champions
- 1982, 2008, 2026

Conference regular-season champions
- 2003, 2004, 2026

Uniforms
Home	Away

The Miami RedHawks women's basketball team (known as the Miami Redskins until 1997) represents Miami University in Women's basketball. The school competes in the Mid-American Conference in NCAA Division I. The RedHawks play home basketball games at Millett Hall in Oxford, Ohio. Miami has won or tied for the regular-season MAC conference title six times and has been MAC tournament champions 3 times. The RedHawks have appeared in the NCAA Tournament two times, most recently in 2026.

The team is currently coached by Glenn Box in his fourth season.

== History ==
Miami fielded its first varsity basketball team in 1975. The program joined the Mid-American Conference in 1981.

=== 1974-1984: Hieber and Wettig era ===
In July 1974, J. Elaine Hieber was named coordinator of women's sports at Miami University, and became head coach. The first recorded game was against the University of Cincinnati, the game was halted with four minutes and fifty seconds remaining to allow for the men's team to begin warmups. Cincinnati had a 53-50 lead when the game was halted.

In May 1975, Pat Wettig was named head coach

== Season-by-season record ==
As of the 2025–26 season, the RedHawks have a 773-707 record, with a 404-362 record in the Mid-American Conference. Miami has won the Mid-American Conference women's basketball tournament twice, in 1982 and 2008, while finishing as runner-up in 1983, 1990, and 1995. They have won the regular season championship 4 times, the East Division twice, while making two appearances in the NCAA Tournament and five appearances in the Women's National Invitation Tournament (WNIT).

Season	Record	Coach
1974–75	8–9	Elaine Hieber
1975–76	9–12	Pam Wettig
1976–77	10–11	Pam Wettig
1977–78	15–6	Pam Wettig
1978–79	9–15	Pam Wettig
1979–80	16–13	Pam Wettig
1980–81	20–13	Pam Wettig
1981–82	24–9	Pam Wettig
1982–83	21–6	Pam Wettig
1983–84	7–18	Pam Wettig
1984–85	14–13	Susan DeKalb
1985–86	12–15	Susan DeKalb
1986–87	11–16	Susan DeKalb
1987–88	17–12	Susan DeKalb
1988–89	18–10	Linda Wunder
1989–90	23–5	Linda Wunder
1990–91	14–14	Linda Wunder
1991–92	14–14	Linda Wunder
1992–93	19–9	Linda Wunder
1993–94	16–11	Lisa Bradley
1994–95	19–10	Lisa Bradley
1995–96	19–9	Lisa Bradley
1996–97	19–10	Lisa Bradley
1997–98	12–15	Lisa Bradley (7–10) and Randy Roberts (5–5)
1998–99	11–15	Maria Fantanarosa
1999-00	16–12	Maria Fantanarosa
2000–01	18–11	Maria Fantanarosa
2001–02	19–11	Maria Fantanarosa
2002–03	17–12	Maria Fantanarosa
2003–04	22–9	Maria Fantanarosa
2004–05	15 14	Maria Fantanarosa
2005–06	8–20	Maria Fantanarosa
2006–07	12–18	Maria Fantanarosa
2007–08	23–11	Maria Fantanarosa
2008–09	16–15	Maria Fantanarosa
2009–10	9–22	Maria Fantanarosa
2010–11	11–19	Maria Fantanarosa
2011–12	21–10	Maria Fantanarosa
2012–13	19–13	Maria Fantanarosa
2013–14	8–22	Cleve Wright
2014–15	7–23	Cleve Wright
2015–16	9–21	Cleve Wright
2016–17	11–21	Cleve Wright
2017–18	21–6	Megan Duffy
2018–19	23–9	Megan Duffy
2019–20	11–20	DeUnna Hendrix
2020–21	4–20	DeUnna Hendrix
2021–22	8–21	DeUnna Hendrix
2022–23	12–19	DeUnna Hendrix
2023–24	9–20	Glenn Box
2024–25	19–12	Glenn Box
2025–26	28–7	Glenn Box

== Postseason appearances ==
=== NCAA Division I ===
Miami has appeared in the NCAA Division I women's basketball tournament twice . They have a record of 0–2.

Year	Seed	Round	Opponent	Result
2008	#13	First Round	#4 Louisville	L 67–81
2026	#13	First Round	#4 West Virginia	L 54–82

=== AIAW Division I ===
The RedHawks, then known as the Redskins, made one appearance in the AIAW National Division I basketball tournament, with a record of 0–1. In 1982, they lost to Villanova 61-69.

Year	Round	Opponent	Result
1982	First Round	Villanova	L 61–69
