= 2025–26 Buffalo Bulls women's basketball team =

American college basketball season

2025–26 Buffalo Bulls women's basketball
- Conference: Mid-American Conference
- Record: 3–27 (1–17 MAC)
- Head coach: Kristen Sharkey (1st season)
- Assistant coaches: Allison Spaschak; Damon Jones; Summer Hemphill; JoAnna Smith
- Home arena: Alumni Arena

2025–26 Mid-American Conference women's basketball standings
	Conf.				Overall
Team	W		L	PCT	W		L	PCT
Miami (OH) †	16	–	2	.889	28	–	7	.800
Ball State	16	–	2	.889	26	–	7	.788
UMass	15	–	3	.833	23	–	7	.767
Central Michigan	12	–	6	.667	18	–	12	.600
Ohio	11	–	7	.611	18	–	14	.563
Toledo	9	–	9	.500	17	–	15	.531
Bowling Green	9	–	9	.500	17	–	14	.548
Kent State	9	–	9	.500	15	–	16	.484
Eastern Michigan	6	–	12	.333	13	–	16	.448
Western Michigan	5	–	13	.278	9	–	20	.310
Akron	4	–	14	.222	7	–	24	.226
Northern Illinois	4	–	14	.222	7	–	23	.233
Buffalo	1	–	17	.056	3	–	27	.100
† 2026 MAC tournament winner

The 2025–26 Buffalo Bulls women's basketball team represented the University at Buffalo during the 2025–26 NCAA Division I women's basketball season. The Bulls, led by first-year head coach Kristen Sharkey, played their home games at Alumni Arena in Amherst, New York as members of the Mid-American Conference.

== Previous season ==
The Bulls finished the 2024–25 season 30–7, 13–5 in MAC play, to finish in a tie for second place. They defeated Bowling Green, before falling to Toledo in the semifinals of the MAC tournament. They received an at-large bid to the WNIT, where they would defeat UMass in the second round, Southern Indiana in the Super 16, Rutgers in the Great 8, Cleveland State in the Fab 4, and Troy to win the WNIT championship, their first postseason title in program history.

Following the season, on April 9, 2025, it was announced that head coach Becky Burke would be leaving the program after three seasons, in order to take the head coaching position at Arizona. A little over a week later, on April 18, the school announced that they would be hiring Buffalo alum and Syracuse associate head coach Kristen Sharkey as the team's next head coach.

== Preseason ==
On October 21, 2025, the Mid-American Conference released their preseason poll. Buffalo was picked to finish 11th in the conference.

=== Preseason rankings ===
MAC Preseason Poll
Place	Team	Votes
1	Kent State	133 (5)
2	Toledo	118 (2)
3	UMass	115 (3)
4	Ball State	112 (3)
5	Central Michigan	105
6	Bowling Green	101
7	Miami	86
8	Akron	51
9	Western Michigan	48
10	Ohio	44
11	Buffalo	42
12	Eastern Michigan	36
13	Northern Illinois	23
(#) first-place votes

=== Tournament Champions ===
MAC Tournament Champions
Team	Votes
Kent State	5
UMass	3
Toledo	3
Ball State	1
Miami	1

=== Preseason All-MAC Teams ===
No players were named to either Preseason All-MAC First or Second Teams.

== Roster ==
2025–26 Buffalo Bulls women's basketball team
Players
Coaches

Pos.	#	Name	Height	Year	Previous school	Hometown
G	1	Gabby McDuffie	5 ft 9 in (1.75 m)	GS	Edinboro	Buffalo, New York
G	2	Anaya Coleman	5 ft 6 in (1.68 m)	Sr	Southeastern	Pittsford, New York
G	7	Aniya Rowe	5 ft 7 in (1.7 m)	RS Fr	AZ Compass Prep	Geneva, New York
F	10	Kyleigh Hall	5 ft 9 in (1.75 m)	Fr	Assumption High School	Louisville, Kentucky
G	11	Deana Thompson	5 ft 8 in (1.73 m)	Fr	Harvard-Westlake School	Los Angeles, California
G	12	Paula Lopez	5 ft 8 in (1.73 m)	Jr	Elite Sports Academy	Alicante, Spain
G	13	Ella Corry	5 ft 9 in (1.75 m)	RS Fr	Clarence High School	Clarence Center, New York
F	21	Diann Jackson	6 ft 1 in (1.85 m)	Fr	Kenwood Academy	Chicago, Illinois
G/F	23	Amber Howard	6 ft 0 in (1.83 m)	So	North Carolina A&T	Philadelphia, Pennsylvania
F	24	Meg Lucas	6 ft 1 in (1.85 m)	Fr	Loreto Mandeville Hall Toorak	Melbourne, Australia
G	32	Janyah Bohanon	6 ft 0 in (1.83 m)	Jr	Howard	Cleveland, Ohio
F	33	Liza Field	6 ft 3 in (1.91 m)	GS	Stony Brook	Manchester, New Hampshire
C	43	Ally Carman	6 ft 5 in (1.96 m)	Sr	Iona	Barnegat, New Jersey

Head coach

- Kristen Sharkey (Buffalo)

Assistant coach(es)

- Allison Spaschak (Ithaca)
- Damon Jones (Mercyhurst)
- Summer Hemphill (Buffalo)
- JoAnna Smith (Buffalo)

Legend

- (C) Team captain
- (S) Suspended
- (I) Ineligible
- (W) Walk-on
- Injured
- Current redshirt

Roster
Last update: July 19, 2026

== Schedule and results ==
Date time, TV	Rank^{#}	Opponent^{#}	Result	Record	High points	High rebounds	High assists	Site (attendance) city, state
Exhibition
October 26, 2025*; 2:00 pm		Canisius	W 69–63	–	–	–	–	Alumni Arena; Amherst, NY
Regular season
November 3, 2025*; 6:00 pm, ESPN+		at Marshall; MAC Sun Belt Challenge	L 39–53	0–1	10 – Coleman	6 – Lucas	2 – Tied	Cam Henderson Center (980); Huntington, WV
November 9, 2025*; 2:00 pm, ESPN+		No. 24т Kentucky	L 47–81	0–2	13 – Lopez	11 – Lucas	3 – Rowe	Alumni Arena (1,715); Amherst, NY
November 12, 2025*; 4:00 pm, ESPN+		at Vermont	L 55–73	0–3	24 – Lopez	9 – Lucas	3 – Lopez	Patrick Gym (629); Burlington, VT
November 16, 2025*; 2:00 pm, ESPN+		Fordham	W 67–59	1–3	19 – Lopez	14 – Lucas	6 – Rowe	Alumni Arena (883); Amherst, NY
November 19, 2025*; 6:00 pm, ESPN+		at St. Bonaventure	L 57–64	1–4	13 – Lopez	7 – Howard	5 – Lopez	Reilly Center (258); St. Bonaventure, NY
November 27, 2025*; 2:30 pm		vs. Longwood; Puerto Rico Clasico	L 64−68	1−5	13 – Tied	15 – Lucas	7 – Coleman	Coliseo Rubén Rodríguez (200); Bayamón, PR
November 29, 2025*; 9:00 am		vs. Hampton; Puerto Rico Clasico	L 56−58	1−6	12 – Tied	16 – Lucas	5 – Rowe	Coliseo Rubén Rodríguez (100); Bayamón, PR
December 3, 2025*; 6:00 pm, ESPN+		Niagara	W 77–51	2–6	18 – Rowe	9 – Lucas	5 – Lopez	Alumni Arena (1,185); Amherst, NY
December 6, 2025*; 2:00 pm, ESPN+		at Binghamton	L 58–71	2–7	17 – Rowe	15 – Lucas	3 – Rowe	Events Center (1,615); Vestal, NY
December 19, 2025*; 8:30 pm, WAC International		vs. Tarleton State; ACU Christmas Classic	L 65–70	2–8	19 – Rowe	17 – Lucas	5 – Rowe	Moody Coliseum (775); Abilene, TX
December 20, 2025*; 4:00 pm, ESPN+		at Abilene Christian; ACU Christmas Classic	L 48–72	2–9	15 – McDuffie	8 – Howard	3 – Lucas	Moody Coliseum (877); Abilene, TX
December 31, 2025; 2:00 pm, ESPN+		at Toledo	L 46–79	2–10 (0–1)	8 – Rowe	5 – Tied	2 – Rowe	Savage Arena (3,860); Toledo, OH
January 3, 2026; 1:00 pm, ESPN+		at Western Michigan	L 65−83	2−11 (0–2)	17 – Lopez	11 – Lucas	4 – Coleman	University Arena (744); Kalamazoo, MI
January 7, 2026; 6:00 pm, ESPN+		Northern Illinois	L 58–64	2–12 (0–3)	16 – Rowe	11 – Howard	4 – Rowe	Alumni Arena (1,380); Amherst, NY
January 10, 2026; 2:00 pm, ESPN+		Ohio	L 59–71	2–13 (0–4)	20 – Rowe	12 – Lucas	3 – Rowe	Alumni Arena (1,005); Amherst, NY
January 14, 2026; 6:30 pm, ESPN+		at Ball State	L 61–103	2–14 (0–5)	24 – Rowe	9 – Lucas	2 – Tied	Worthen Arena (1,487); Muncie, IN
January 17, 2026; 1:00 pm, ESPN+		UMass	L 67–79	2–15 (0–6)	19 – Rowe	9 – Lucas	6 – Tied	Alumni Arena (933); Amherst, NY
January 21, 2026; 7:00 pm, ESPN+		at Miami (OH)	L 52–76	2–16 (0–7)	12 – Lucas	10 – Lucas	5 – Lopez	Millett Hall (421); Oxford, OH
January 24, 2026; 12:00 pm, ESPN+		Kent State	L 74–84	2–17 (0–8)	34 – Rowe	7 – Lucas	5 – Rowe	Alumni Arena (955); Amherst, NY
January 28, 2026; 6:00 pm, ESPN+		Eastern Michigan	L 51–71	2–18 (0–9)	13 – Rowe	8 – McDuffie	5 – Rowe	Alumni Arena (1,010); Amherst, NY
January 31, 2026; 12:00 pm, ESPN+		at Akron	L 72–76	2–19 (0–10)	22 – Rowe	12 – Lucas	6 – Rowe	James A. Rhodes Arena; Akron, OH
February 4, 2026; 11:00 am, ESPN+		Central Michigan	L 59–90	2–20 (0–11)	25 – Rowe	7 – Lucas	5 – Rowe	Alumni Arena (5,778); Amherst, NY
February 7, 2026*; 2:00 pm, ESPN+		Louisiana–Monroe; MAC Sun Belt Challenge	L 64–73	2–21	17 – Lucas	8 – Lucas	4 – Coleman	Alumni Arena (1,285); Amherst, NY
February 10, 2026; 7:00 pm, ESPN+		at Bowling Green	L 61–72	2–22 (0–12)	15 – Lucas	12 – Lucas	4 – Jackson	Stroh Center (1,450); Bowling Green, OH
February 18, 2026; 6:00 pm, ESPN+		Ball State	L 55–88	2–23 (0–13)	18 – Rowe	12 – Lucas	6 – Rowe	Alumni Arena (1,099); Amherst, NY
February 21, 2026; 2:00 pm, ESPN+		at Eastern Michigan	L 63–73	2–24 (0–14)	22 – Lucas	13 – Lucas	4 – Lopez	George Gervin GameAbove Center (1,273); Ypsilanti, MI
February 25, 2026; 6:00 pm, ESPN+		Western Michigan	L 43–58	2–25 (0–15)	15 – Lucas	6 – Lucas	3 – Rowe	Alumni Arena (1,290); Amherst, NY
February 28, 2026; 4:30 pm, ESPN+		Toledo	W 69–66	3–25 (1–15)	18 – Tied	10 – Rowe	7 – Rowe	Alumni Arena (1,310); Amherst, NY
March 4, 2026; 7:00 pm, ESPN+		at Northern Illinois	L 53–56	3–26 (1–16)	11 – Howard	7 – Howard	5 – Lopez	NIU Convocation Center (431); DeKalb, IL
March 7, 2026; 1:00 pm, ESPN+		at UMass	L 55–73	3–27 (1–17)	21 – Lopez	9 – Lucas	8 – Rowe	Mullins Center (2,444); Amherst, MA
*Non-conference game. ^{#}Rankings from AP Poll. (#) Tournament seedings in parentheses. All times are in Eastern.
