= Buffalo Bulls basketball =

Buffalo Bulls basketball may refer to either of the basketball teams that represent the University at Buffalo:

- Buffalo Bulls men's basketball
- Buffalo Bulls women's basketball
