= 2025–26 Charleston Southern Buccaneers women's basketball team =

American college basketball season

2025–26 Charleston Southern Buccaneers women's basketball
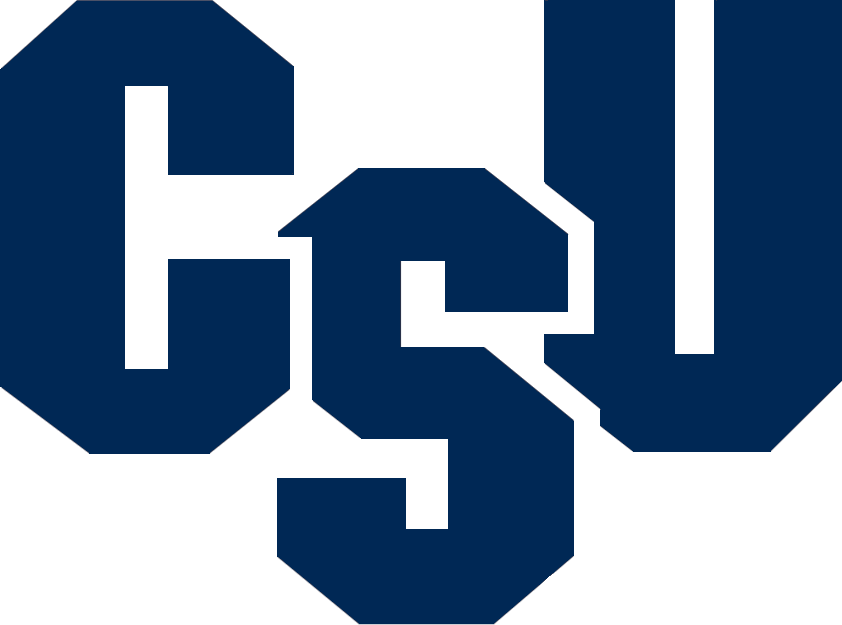
- Conference: Big South Conference
- Record: 8–22 (6–10 Big South)
- Head coach: Clarisse White (5th season)
- Associate head coach: Ashley Reddick
- Assistant coaches: Cortez Mitchell; Amir Gilliam; Lauren Bevis
- Home arena: Buccaneer Field House

2025–26 Big South women's basketball standings
	Conf.				Overall
Team	W		L	PCT	W		L	PCT
High Point †	13	–	3	.813	27	–	6	.818
Radford	12	–	4	.750	23	–	13	.639
Longwood	11	–	5	.688	21	–	10	.677
Gardner–Webb	9	–	7	.563	12	–	19	.387
Winthrop	7	–	9	.438	15	–	17	.469
UNC Asheville	7	–	9	.438	12	–	18	.400
Charleston Southern	6	–	10	.375	8	–	22	.267
USC Upstate	6	–	10	.375	12	–	20	.375
Presbyterian	1	–	15	.063	3	–	27	.100
† 2026 Big South tournament winner

The 2025–26 Charleston Southern Buccaneers women's basketball team represented Charleston Southern University during the 2025–26 NCAA Division I women's basketball season. The Buccaneers, led by fifth-year head coach Clarisse White, played their home games at the Buccaneer Field House in North Charleston, South Carolina as members of the Big South Conference.

== Previous season ==
The Buccaneers finished the 2024–25 season 14–16, 10–6 in Big South play, to finish in a tie for third place. They were defeated by Winthrop in the quarterfinals of the Big South tournament.

== Preseason ==
On October 15, 2025, the Big South Conference released their preseason poll. Charleston Southern was picked to finish fifth in the conference.

=== Preseason rankings ===
Big South Preseason Poll
Place	Team	Votes
1	High Point	77 (6)
2	Longwood	69 (1)
3	Radford	67 (1)
4	Winthrop	48
5	Charleston Southern	41
6	USC Upstate	33
7	Gardner–Webb	25
8	Presbyterian	23
9	UNC Asheville	22 (1)
(#) first-place votes

=== Preseason All-Big South Teams ===
Preseason All-Big South Teams
Team	Player	Year	Position
Second	Tyonna Bailey	Junior	Guard

== Roster ==
2025–26 Charleston Southern Buccaneers women's basketball team
Players
Coaches

Pos.	#	Name	Height	Year	Previous school	Hometown
G	0	Mya Dotson	5 ft 10 in (1.78 m)	RS So	Lewisville High School	Lewisville, Texas
G	2	Courtney Davis (C)	5 ft 4 in (1.63 m)	GS	Little Rock	Warner Robins, Georgia
G	3	Tyonna Bailey	5 ft 10 in (1.78 m)	Jr	St. John's	Newark, New Jersey
G	4	Caelan Ellis	5 ft 6 in (1.68 m)	RS Jr	Buffalo	Powder Springs, Georgia
G	5	Taylor Caldwell	5 ft 10 in (1.78 m)	Sr	East Georgia State College	Lithia Springs, Georgia
G	6	Aïssé Coulibaly	5 ft 9 in (1.75 m)	Fr	Hamilton Heights Christian Academy	Paris, France
G	7	Naveyah Damon	6 ft 0 in (1.83 m)	Jr	Oakland	Miami, Florida
C	10	Nevaeh Jones	6 ft 2 in (1.88 m)	Fr	Bastrop High School	Bastrop, Texas
G	11	Alba Garcia	6 ft 0 in (1.83 m)	Sr	IES Ortega y Gasset	Madrid, Spain
G	12	Sydney Bradley	5 ft 10 in (1.78 m)	Jr	Northwest Florida State College	St. Louis, Missouri
G	15	Alaina Nettles (C)	5 ft 7 in (1.7 m)	Jr	Cane Bay High School	Anchorage, Alaska
G	20	Thelma Barbitch	5 ft 10 in (1.78 m)	RS So	UTEP	Paris, France
G	21	Asha Sra	5 ft 9 in (1.75 m)	RS Jr	Grand Canyon	Fresno, California
F	22	Saniya Jones	6 ft 4 in (1.93 m)	Sr	Duluth High School	Tucker, Georgia
G	35	Laura Ortega	5 ft 10 in (1.78 m)	GS	Highland Community College	San Fernando, Spain

Head coach

- Clarisse White (Villanova)

Assistant coach(es)

- Ashley Reddick (Oklahoma Wesleyan)
- Cortez Mitchell (Charleston Southern)
- Amir Gilliam (Northeastern State)
- Lauren Bevis (High Point)

Legend

- (C) Team captain
- (S) Suspended
- (I) Ineligible
- (W) Walk-on
- Injured
- Current redshirt

Roster
Last update: March 9, 2026

== Schedule and results ==
Date time, TV	Rank^{#}	Opponent^{#}	Result	Record	Site (attendance) city, state
Non-conference regular season
November 3, 2025*; 6:30 pm, ESPN+		at Jacksonville	L 84–86 ^{OT}	0–1	Swisher Gymnasium (124); Jacksonville, FL
November 7, 2025*; 11:00 am, FloCollege		at Charleston	L 65–80	0–2	TD Arena (3,617); Charleston, SC
November 11, 2025*; 6:00 pm, ESPN+		at East Carolina	L 62–91	0–3	Williams Arena (890); Greenville, NC
November 13, 2025*; 7:00 pm, ACCNX		at Georgia Tech	L 40–87	0–4	McCamish Pavilion (1,439); Atlanta, GA
November 22, 2025*; 6:00 pm, ESPN+		South Carolina State	W 53−51	1−4	Buccaneer Field House (862); North Charleston, SC
November 25, 2025*; 5:00 pm, ESPN+		Georgia Southern	L 57−65	1−5	Buccaneer Field House (356); North Charleston, SC
November 28, 2025*; 2:00 pm, ESPN+		Mercer	L 45–71	1–6	Buccaneer Field House (180); North Charleston, SC
December 1, 2025*; 6:00 pm, ESPN+		Allen	W 83–62	2–6	Buccaneer Field House (456); North Charleston, SC
December 6, 2025*; 1:00 pm, ESPN+		at Wofford	L 42–70	2–7	Jerry Richardson Indoor Stadium (371); Spartanburg, SC
December 17, 2025*; 11:00 am, ESPN+		Clemson	L 52–78	2–8	Buccaneer Field House (390); North Charleston, SC
December 19, 2025*; 6:00 pm, ESPN+		Furman	L 53–66	2–9	Buccaneer Field House (135); North Charleston, SC
December 21, 2025*; 12:00 pm, ACCNX		at No. 18 North Carolina	L 74−93	2−10	Carmichael Arena (2,369); Chapel Hill, NC
December 29, 2025*; 12:00 pm, SECN+		at Georgia	L 52–97	2–11	Stegeman Coliseum (1,972); Athens, GA
Big South regular season
December 31, 2025; 3:00 pm, ESPN+		USC Upstate	W 60–49	3–11 (1–0)	Buccaneer Field House (72); North Charleston, SC
January 3, 2026; 2:00 pm, ESPN+		at Radford	W 63–59	4–11 (2–0)	Dedmon Center (597); Radford, VA
January 7, 2026; 6:00 pm, ESPN+		Longwood	L 63–83	4–12 (2–1)	Buccaneer Field House (68); North Charleston, SC
January 10, 2026; 2:00 pm, ESPN+		at Winthrop	L 54–63	4–13 (2–2)	Winthrop Coliseum (243); Rock Hill, SC
January 14, 2026; 6:30 pm, ESPN+		at UNC Asheville	W 72–66	5–13 (3–2)	Kimmel Arena (582); Asheville, NC
January 17, 2026; 2:00 pm, ESPN+		Gardner–Webb	L 45–52	5–14 (3–3)	Buccaneer Field House (522); North Charleston, SC
January 23, 2026; 6:00 pm, ESPN+		at Presbyterian	W 77–73	6–14 (4–3)	Templeton Center (219); Clinton, SC
January 28, 2026; 6:00 pm, ESPN+		High Point	L 66–87	6–15 (4–4)	Buccaneer Field House (345); North Charleston, SC
January 30, 2026; 6:00 pm, ESPN+		at USC Upstate	W 85–62	7–15 (5–4)	G. B. Hodge Center (124); Spartanburg, SC
February 4, 2026; 6:00 pm, ESPN+		UNC Asheville	L 48–60	7–16 (5–5)	Buccaneer Field House (310); North Charleston, SC
February 7, 2026; 2:00 pm, ESPN+		Presbyterian	W 88–62	8–16 (6–5)	Buccaneer Field House (322); North Charleston, SC
February 11, 2026; 7:00 pm, ESPN+		at Gardner–Webb	L 44–56	8–17 (6–6)	Paul Porter Arena (378); Boiling Springs, NC
February 14, 2026; 7:00 pm, ESPN+		at High Point	L 48–64	8–18 (6–7)	Qubein Center (1,447); High Point, NC
February 21, 2026; 1:00 pm, ESPN+		Radford	L 78–92	8–19 (6–8)	Buccaneer Field House (278); North Charleston, SC
February 25, 2026; 7:00 pm, ESPN+		at Longwood	L 69–96	8–20 (6–9)	Joan Perry Brock Center (1,044); Farmville, VA
February 28, 2026; 2:00 pm, ESPN+		Winthrop	L 55–77	8–21 (6–10)	Buccaneer Field House (382); North Charleston, SC
Big South tournament
March 5, 2026; 6:00 pm, ESPN+	(7)	vs. (2) Radford; Quarterfinals	L 67–86	8–22	Freedom Hall Civic Center; Johnson City, TN
*Non-conference game. ^{#}Rankings from AP Poll. (#) Tournament seedings in parentheses. All times are in Eastern.
