= Kristen Sharkey =

American basketball player and coach (born 1992)

Current position
- Title: Head coach
- Team: Buffalo
- Conference: MAC
- Record: 3–27 (.100)
- Annual salary: $257,000

Biographical details
- Born: January 17, 1992 (age 34)

Playing career
- 2010–2015: Buffalo
- Position: Forward

Coaching career (HC unless noted)
- 2015–2022: Buffalo (asst.)
- 2022–2024: Syracuse (asst.)
- 2024–2025: Syracuse (assoc. HC)
- 2025–present: Buffalo

Head coaching record
- Overall: 3–27 (.100)

Kristen N. Sharkey (born January 17, 1992) is an American women's basketball coach who is currently the women's basketball head coach at the University at Buffalo. She previously served as an assistant at Syracuse and Buffalo

== Early life and education ==
She is a 2010 graduate of Southern Regional High School in Manahawkin, New Jersey. From 2010 to 2015 she attended Buffalo where she played basketball and was a two-time All-MAC selection. While at Buffalo she earned bachelor’s degree in psychology and an MBA in 2021.

== Coaching career ==
She began her coaching career at her alma-mater in 2015 under her former coach Felisha Legette-Jack. In her tenure at Buffalo the Bulls made the NCAA tournament four times including a sweet 16 appearance in 2018. When Legette-Jack took the head coach at position Syracuse Sharkey followed her as an assistant there for three seasons. For fer final year at Syracuse, she was named the program's associate head coach.

=== Buffalo ===
On April 18, 2025 she returned to alma-mater as the school's 14th women's basketball head coach.

== Head coaching record ==
Record table
Season	Team	Overall	Conference	Standing	Postseason
Buffalo (Mid-American Conference) (2025–present)
2025–26	Buffalo	3-27	1-17	13th	
Buffalo:		3–27 (.100)	1–17 (.056)		
Total:		3–27 (.100)			
National champion Postseason invitational champion Conference regular season champion Conference regular season and conference tournament champion Division regular season champion Division regular season and conference tournament champion Conference tournament champion
