= 2026 Big South Conference women's basketball tournament =

American collegiate sporting event

- Classification: Division I
- Season: 2025–26
- Teams: 9
- Site: Freedom Hall Civic Center; Johnson City, Tennessee
- Champions: High Point (3rd title)
- Winning coach: Chelsea Banbury (3rd title)
- Television: ESPN+, ESPN2

2025–26 Big South women's basketball standings
	Conf.				Overall
Team	W		L	PCT	W		L	PCT
High Point †	13	–	3	.813	27	–	6	.818
Radford	12	–	4	.750	23	–	13	.639
Longwood	11	–	5	.688	21	–	10	.677
Gardner–Webb	9	–	7	.563	12	–	19	.387
Winthrop	7	–	9	.438	15	–	17	.469
UNC Asheville	7	–	9	.438	12	–	18	.400
Charleston Southern	6	–	10	.375	8	–	22	.267
USC Upstate	6	–	10	.375	12	–	20	.375
Presbyterian	1	–	15	.063	3	–	27	.100
† 2026 Big South tournament winner

The 2026 Big South women's basketball tournament was the postseason women's basketball tournament that ended the 2025–26 NCAA Division I women's basketball season of the Big South Conference. It was held from March 4–8, 2026 and played at the Freedom Hall Civic Center in Johnson City, Tennessee. As tournament champions, High Point received the conference's automatic bid to the 2026 NCAA tournament.

Defending champions No. 1 High Point defeated No. 2 Radford 71–67 in the championship game, once again claiming the Big South title for the second consecutive year and the third in program history.

== Seeds ==
All of the conference teams competed in the tournament. The top seven teams received a first-round bye. Teams were seeded by record within the conference, with a tiebreaker system to seed teams with identical conference records.

The tiebreakers operate in the following order:

1. Head-to-head record.
2. Record against the top-ranked conference team not involved in the tie, going down the standings until the tie is broken. For this purpose, teams with the same conference record are considered collectively. If two teams were unbeaten or winless against an opponent but did not play the same number of games against that opponent, the tie is not considered broken.

Seed	School	Conference	Overall	Tiebreaker
1	High Point	13–3	25–6	
2	Radford	12–4	20–11	
3	Longwood	11–5	20–9	
4	Gardner–Webb	9–7	12–18	
5	Winthrop	7–9	14–18	1–1 vs. Longwood
6	UNC Asheville	7–9	12–17	0–2 vs. Longwood
7	Charleston Southern	6–10	8–21	2–0 vs. USC Upstate
8	USC Upstate	6–10	11–19	0–2 vs. Charleston Southern
9	Presbyterian	1–15	3–26	

== Schedule ==
Game	Time*	Matchup	Score	Channel
Opening round - Wednesday, March 4
1	5:00 p.m.	No. 8 USC Upstate vs No. 9 Presbyterian	60–48	ESPN+
Quarterfinals - Thursday, March 5
2	11:30 a.m.	No. 1 High Point vs No. 8 USC Upstate	71–53	ESPN+
3	2:00 p.m.	No. 4 Gardner-Webb vs. No. 5 Winthrop	52–64	ESPN+
4	6:00 p.m.	No. 2 Radford vs No. 7 Charleston Southern	86–67	ESPN+
5	8:30 p.m.	No. 3 Longwood vs. No. 6 UNC Asheville	72–58	ESPN+
Semifinals - Saturday, March 7
6	6:00 p.m.	No. 1 High Point vs No. 5 Winthrop	79–63	ESPN+
7	8:30 p.m.	No. 2 Radford vs No. 3 Longwood	81–58	ESPN+
Championship - Sunday, March 8
8	6:00 p.m.	No. 1 High Point vs No. 2 Radford	71–67	ESPN2
*Game times in ET

== Bracket ==
Opening round Wednesday, March 4 ESPN+
8	USC Upstate	60
9	Presbyterian	48

Quarterfinals; Thursday, March 5 ESPN+
1	High Point	71
8	USC Upstate	53
4	Gardner-Webb	52
5	Winthrop	64
2	Radford	86
7	Charleston Southern	67
3	Longwood	72
6	UNC Asheville	58

Semifinals; Saturday, March 7 ESPN+
1	High Point	79
5	Winthrop	63
2	Radford	81
3	Longwood	58

Championship; Sunday, March 8 ESPN2
1	High Point	71
2	Radford	67
