= 2025–26 Longwood Lancers women's basketball team =

American college basketball season

2025–26 Longwood Lancers women's basketball
- Conference: Big South Conference
- Record: 21–10 (11–5 Big South)
- Head coach: Erika Lang-Montgomery (4th season)
- Assistant coaches: Landis F. McCoy; Rachel Balzer; Ivana Boyd
- Home arena: Joan Perry Brock Center

2025–26 Big South women's basketball standings
	Conf.				Overall
Team	W		L	PCT	W		L	PCT
High Point †	13	–	3	.813	27	–	6	.818
Radford	12	–	4	.750	23	–	13	.639
Longwood	11	–	5	.688	21	–	10	.677
Gardner–Webb	9	–	7	.563	12	–	19	.387
Winthrop	7	–	9	.438	15	–	17	.469
UNC Asheville	7	–	9	.438	12	–	18	.400
Charleston Southern	6	–	10	.375	8	–	22	.267
USC Upstate	6	–	10	.375	12	–	20	.375
Presbyterian	1	–	15	.063	3	–	27	.100
† 2026 Big South tournament winner

The 2025–26 Longwood Lancers women's basketball team represented Longwood University during the 2025–26 NCAA Division I women's basketball season. The Lancers, led by fourth-year head coach Erika Lang-Montgomery, played their home games at the Joan Perry Brock Center in Farmville, Virginia as members of the Big South Conference. The Lancers finished the season 21–10, 11–5 in Big South play, to finish in third place. It was the first time in 25 years the team had recorded 20-plus wins in consecutive seasons. In the Big South tournament, they defeated UNC Asheville in the quarterfinals before being eliminated by second-seeded Radford in the semifinals.

== Previous season ==
The Lancers finished the 2024–25 season 22–12, 11–5 in Big South play, to finish in second place. In the Big South tournament, they defeated USC Upstate and Radford, before falling to top-seeded High Point in the championship game. They received an automatic bid to the WNIT, where they were defeated by Duquesne in the first round.

== Preseason ==
On October 15, 2025, the Big South Conference released their preseason poll. Longwood was picked to finish second in the conference, with one first-place vote.

=== Preseason rankings ===
Big South Preseason Poll
Place	Team	Votes
1	High Point	77 (6)
2	Longwood	69 (1)
3	Radford	67 (1)
4	Winthrop	48
5	Charleston Southern	41
6	USC Upstate	33
7	Gardner–Webb	25
8	Presbyterian	23
9	UNC Asheville	22 (1)
(#) first-place votes

=== Preseason All-Big South Teams ===
Preseason All-Big South Teams
Team	Player	Year	Position
First	Amor Harris	Junior	Guard
Second	Malea Brown	Graduate Student	Guard

== Roster ==
2025–26 Longwood Lancers women's basketball team
Players
Coaches

Pos.	#	Name	Height	Year	Previous school	Hometown
F	0	Otaifo Esenabhalu	6 ft 2 in (1.88 m)	Jr	Lowndes High School	Valdosta, GA
G	2	Jaci Bolden	5 ft 7 in (1.7 m)	Sr	Cape Fear Community College	Conyers, GA
G	3	Lili Booker	5 ft 6 in (1.68 m)	So	Mallard Creek High School	Charlotte, NC
G	7	Kayla Washington	5 ft 9 in (1.75 m)	Fr	Bishop Ireton High School	Brandywine, MD
G	10	Malea Brown	5 ft 5 in (1.65 m)	GS	Santa Fe College	Putnam Hall, FL
G	11	Jesstynie Scott	5 ft 10 in (1.78 m)	Fr	Sumter County High School	Americus, GA
G	12	Olivia Bowes	6 ft 0 in (1.83 m)	So	Catholic High School	Chesapeake, VA
F	13	Frances Ulysse	6 ft 1 in (1.85 m)	Jr	Vanier College	Montreal, QC
G	20	Nalani Simmons	5 ft 8 in (1.73 m)	Jr	Deep Creek High School	Chesapeake, VA
G/F	21	JaMya Robinson	5 ft 11 in (1.8 m)	Sr	Indian River State College	Muskegon, MI
F	22	London Harvey	6 ft 2 in (1.88 m)	Fr	Enlightium Academy	Baltimore, MD
G	24	Amor Harris	5 ft 9 in (1.75 m)	Jr	Alexandria City High School	Alexandria, VA
G	25	Jasmine Peaks	5 ft 5 in (1.65 m)	RS Sr	Wichita State	Palm Bay, FL
F	35	Alary Bell	6 ft 2 in (1.88 m)	RS So	Saint Francis (PA)	Chester, VA

Head coach

- Erika Lang-Montgomery (Florida)

Assistant coach(es)

- Landis F. McCoy (Bethune–Cookman)
- Rachel Balzer (George Mason)
- Ivana Boyd (Flagler)

Legend

- (C) Team captain
- (S) Suspended
- (I) Ineligible
- (W) Walk-on
- Injured
- Current redshirt

Roster
Last update: March 2, 2026

== Schedule and results ==
Date time, TV	Rank^{#}	Opponent^{#}	Result	Record	Site (attendance) city, state
Non-conference regular season
November 5, 2025*; 7:00 p.m., ESPN+		Randolph	W 121–35	1–0	Joan Perry Brock Center (1,100); Farmville, VA
November 8, 2025*; 12:00 p.m., ESPN+		Western Kentucky	W 80–42	2–0	Joan Perry Brock Center (1,017); Farmville, VA
November 12, 2025*; 7:00 p.m., ESPN+		at Navy	L 66–74	2–1	Alumni Hall (448); Annapolis, MD
November 14, 2025*; 8:00 p.m., ESPN+		Bluefield	W 128–31	3–1	Joan Perry Brock Center (2,467); Farmville, VA
November 17, 2025*; 7:00 p.m., ESPN+		George Washington	W 71−62	4−1	Joan Perry Brock Center (924); Farmville, VA
November 20, 2025*; 6:00 p.m., ACCN		at Virginia	L 47−94	4−2	John Paul Jones Arena (3,569); Charlottesville, VA
November 24, 2025*; 7:00 p.m., SECN+		at No. 13 Ole Miss	L 50–102	4–3	SJB Pavilion (2,574); Oxford, MS
November 27, 2025*; 2:30 p.m.		vs. Buffalo; Puerto Rico Clasico	W 68–64	5–3	Coliseo Rubén Rodríguez (200); Bayamón, Puerto Rico
November 29, 2025*; 11:30 a.m.		vs. Stephen F. Austin; Puerto Rico Clasico	W 68–60	6–3	Coliseo Rubén Rodríguez (100); Bayamón, Puerto Rico
December 3, 2025*; 11:00 a.m., ESPN+		Troy	L 83–86	6–4	Joan Perry Brock Center (1,649); Farmville, VA
December 7, 2025*; 1:00 p.m., ESPN+		UNC Pembroke	W 90–62	7–4	Joan Perry Brock Center (838); Farmville, VA
December 14, 2025*; 1:00 p.m., FloCollege		at Elon	W 67−66	8−4	Schar Center (607); Elon, NC
December 21, 2025*; 2:00 p.m., ESPN+		UNC Wilmington	W 98–72	9–4	Joan Perry Brock Center (812); Farmville, VA
Big South regular season
January 3, 2026; 2:00 p.m., ESPN+		Presbyterian	W 89–56	10–4 (1–0)	Joan Perry Brock Center (862); Farmville, VA
January 7, 2026; 6:00 p.m., ESPN+		at Charleston Southern	W 83–63	11–4 (2–0)	Buccaneer Field House (68); North Charleston, SC
January 10, 2026; 2:00 p.m., ESPN+		at UNC Asheville	W 67–58	12–4 (3–0)	Kimmel Arena (329); Asheville, NC
January 14, 2026; 7:00 p.m., ESPN+		Winthrop	W 100–79	13–4 (4–0)	Joan Perry Brock Center (1,267); Farmville, VA
January 17, 2026; 2:00 p.m., ESPN+		High Point	L 54–68	13–5 (4–1)	Joan Perry Brock Center (1,318); Farmville, VA
January 21, 2026; 7:00 p.m., ESPN+		at Radford	L 63–78	13–6 (4–2)	Dedmon Center (591); Radford, VA
January 23, 2026; 2:00 p.m., ESPN+		USC Upstate	W 74–50	14–6 (5–2)	Joan Perry Brock Center (873); Farmville, VA
January 28, 2026; 7:00 p.m., ESPN+		at Gardner–Webb	W 76–70	15–6 (6–2)	Paul Porter Arena (456); Boiling Springs, NC
February 4, 2026; 7:00 p.m., ESPN+		Radford	W 88–73 ^{OT}	16–6 (7–2)	Joan Perry Brock Center (1,042); Farmville, VA
February 7, 2026; 2:00 p.m., ESPN+		UNC Asheville	W 72–60	17–6 (8–2)	Joan Perry Brock Center (1,147); Farmville, VA
February 11, 2026; 7:00 p.m., ESPN+		at High Point	W 75–73 ^{OT}	18–6 (9–2)	Qubein Center (1,150); High Point, NC
February 14, 2026; 2:00 p.m., ESPN+		at Winthrop	L 65–75	18–7 (9–3)	Winthrop Coliseum (593); Rock Hill, SC
February 18, 2026; 7:00 p.m., ESPN+		Gardner–Webb	L 51–53	18–8 (9–4)	Joan Perry Brock Center (1,036); Farmville, VA
February 21, 2026; 2:00 p.m., ESPN+		at USC Upstate	L 63–65 ^{2OT}	18–9 (9–5)	G. B. Hodge Center (251); Spartanburg, SC
February 25, 2026; 7:00 p.m., ESPN+		Charleston Southern	W 96–69	19–9 (10–5)	Joan Perry Brock Center (1,044); Farmville, VA
February 28, 2026; 2:00 p.m., ESPN+		at Presbyterian	W 89–57	20–9 (11–5)	Templeton Center (213); Clinton, SC
Big South tournament
March 5, 2026; 8:30 p.m., ESPN+	(3)	vs. (6) UNC Asheville; Quarterfinals	W 72–58	21–9	Freedom Hall Civic Center (1,208); Johnson City, TN
March 7, 2026; 8:30 p.m., ESPN+	(3)	vs. (2) Radford; Semifinals	L 58–81	21–10	Freedom Hall Civic Center (1,661); Johnson City, TN
*Non-conference game. ^{#}Rankings from AP poll. (#) Tournament seedings in parentheses. All times are in Eastern.
