= 2025–26 High Point Panthers women's basketball team =

American college basketball season

2025–26 High Point Panthers women's basketball

Big South regular season and tournament champions

NCAA tournament, First Round
- Conference: Big South Conference
- Record: 27–6 (13–3 Big South)
- Head coach: Chelsea Banbury (7th season)
- Assistant coaches: Brittany Brown; Katie Clayman; Brendan Quinlan-Huertas; Callie Scheier; Elise Fralin
- Home arena: Qubein Center

2025–26 Big South women's basketball standings
	Conf.				Overall
Team	W		L	PCT	W		L	PCT
High Point †	13	–	3	.813	27	–	6	.818
Radford	12	–	4	.750	23	–	13	.639
Longwood	11	–	5	.688	21	–	10	.677
Gardner–Webb	9	–	7	.563	12	–	19	.387
Winthrop	7	–	9	.438	15	–	17	.469
UNC Asheville	7	–	9	.438	12	–	18	.400
Charleston Southern	6	–	10	.375	8	–	22	.267
USC Upstate	6	–	10	.375	12	–	20	.375
Presbyterian	1	–	15	.063	3	–	27	.100
† 2026 Big South tournament winner

The 2025–26 High Point Panthers women's basketball team represented High Point University during the 2025–26 NCAA Division I women's basketball season. The Panthers, led by seventh-year head coach Chelsea Banbury, played their home games at the Qubein Center in High Point, North Carolina as members of the Big South Conference.

== Previous season ==
The Panthers finished the 2024–25 season 21–12, 13–3 in Big South play, to finish as Big South regular season champions. They defeated UNC Asheville, Winthrop, and Longwood to win the Big South tournament championship, sending the Panthers to their second NCAA tournament appearance, and their first since 2021. In the tournament, they would receive the No. 16 seed in the Birmingham Regional 3, where they would be defeated by fellow No. 16 seed William & Mary in the First Four.

== Preseason ==
On October 15, 2025, the Big South Conference released their preseason poll. High Point was picked to repeat as conference champions, with six first-place votes.

=== Preseason rankings ===
Big South Preseason Poll
Place	Team	Votes
1	High Point	77 (6)
2	Longwood	69 (1)
3	Radford	67 (1)
4	Winthrop	48
5	Charleston Southern	41
6	USC Upstate	33
7	Gardner–Webb	25
8	Presbyterian	23
9	UNC Asheville	22 (1)
(#) first-place votes

=== Preseason All-Big South Teams ===
Preseason All-Big South Teams
Team	Player	Year	Position
First	Nevaeh Zavala	Senior	Forward
Second	Aaliyah Collins	Graduate Student	Guard

== Roster ==
2025–26 High Point Panthers women's basketball team
Players
Coaches

Pos.	#	Name	Height	Year	Previous school	Hometown
G	0	Lexi Fleming	5 ft 5 in (1.65 m)	GS	Bowling Green	Cincinnati, Ohio
G	1	Olivia Medford	5 ft 11 in (1.8 m)	RS Sr	Indiana State	Rockville Centre, New York
G	2	Cheyenne Brand	6 ft 0 in (1.83 m)	Fr	Greens Farms Academy	West Haven, Connecticut
F	3	Nevaeh Zavala	6 ft 0 in (1.83 m)	Sr	Royse City High School	Plano, Texas
G	4	Sanai Cole	5 ft 7 in (1.7 m)	Fr	Oak City Prep	Raleigh, North Carolina
G	5	Chana Paxixe	5 ft 8 in (1.73 m)	Sr	Cochise College	Beira, Mozambique
G	6	Dakota Phillips	5 ft 9 in (1.75 m)	So	Hart County High School	Hartwell, Georgia
G	7	Brecken Snotherly	5 ft 10 in (1.78 m)	Jr	East Tennessee State	Franklinville, North Carolina
G	9	Dom Nesland	5 ft 9 in (1.75 m)	So	Xavier College Prep	Phoenix, Arizona
G	11	Kenaya Klintman	5 ft 10 in (1.78 m)	So	RIG Mark	Malmö, Sweden
G	13	Macy Spencer	5 ft 8 in (1.73 m)	Jr	UNLV	Katy, Texas
G	14	Anna Häger	6 ft 0 in (1.83 m)	Sr	Luleå Gymnasieskola	Gothenburg, Sweden
F	21	Sky Donaie	6 ft 1 in (1.85 m)	Fr	Heritage High School	Wake Forest, North Carolina
G	25	Aaliyah Collins	5 ft 6 in (1.68 m)	GS	Grand Canyon	Snohomish, Washington
F	33	Peyton Gerdes	6 ft 0 in (1.83 m)	RS So	Grayslake North High School	Lake Villa, Illinois
C	40	Kelsey Miller	6 ft 5 in (1.96 m)	Fr	Chanhassen High School	Victoria, Minnesota

Head coach

- Chelsea Banbury (Florida Gulf Coast)

Assistant coach(es)

- Brittany Brown (Florida Gulf Coast)
- Katie Clayman (Oregon)
- Brendan Quinlan-Huertas (High Point)
- Callie Scheier (High Point)
- Elise Fralin (High Point)

Legend

- (C) Team captain
- (S) Suspended
- (I) Ineligible
- (W) Walk-on
- Injured
- Current redshirt

Roster
Last update: March 1, 2026

== Schedule and results ==
Date time, TV	Rank^{#}	Opponent^{#}	Result	Record	Site (attendance) city, state
Non-conference regular season
November 3, 2025*; 7:00 pm, ESPN+		Johnson C. Smith	W 84–26	1–0	Qubein Center (3,874); High Point, NC
November 8, 2025*; 12:00 pm, ESPN+		Wofford	W 81–73	2–0	Qubein Center (4,156); High Point, NC
November 12, 2025*; 7:00 pm, ESPN+		Merrimack	W 82–69	3–0	Qubein Center (738); High Point, NC
November 16, 2025*; 2:00 pm, ESPN+		East Carolina	W 84–68	4–0	Qubein Center (967); High Point, NC
November 19, 2025*; 7:00 pm, ESPN+		Vermont	W 71–65	5–0	Qubein Center (675); High Point, NC
November 23, 2025*; 3:00 pm, ESPN+		at Houston	L 57−67	5−1	Fertitta Center (1,225); Houston, TX
November 28, 2025*; 1:00 pm, YouTube		vs. Louisiana; Big Easy Classic	W 77−62	6−1	Alario Center (196); Westwego, LA
November 29, 2025*; 1:00 pm, YouTube		vs. Charleston; Big Easy Classic	W 70–59	7–1	Alario Center (176); Westwego, LA
December 1, 2025*; 7:00 pm, ESPN+		UVA Wise	W 101–57	8–1	Qubein Center (645); High Point, NC
December 5, 2025*; 11:30 am		at South Carolina State	W 64–44	9–1	Tullis Arena (65); Orangeburg, SC
December 14, 2025*; 2:00 pm, ESPN+		North Carolina Central	W 82–60	10–1	Qubein Center (1,030); High Point, NC
December 17, 2025*; 7:00 pm, ESPN+		at Davidson	L 65–76	10–2	John M. Belk Arena (737); Davidson, NC
December 20, 2025*; 12:00 pm, ESPN+		Yale	W 85−83 ^{2OT}	11−2	Qubein Center (954); High Point, NC
Big South regular season
December 31, 2025; 2:00 pm, ESPN+		UNC Asheville	W 78–51	12–2 (1–0)	Qubein Center (780); High Point, NC
January 3, 2026; 4:00 pm, ESPN+		at USC Upstate	W 72–58	13–2 (2–0)	G. B. Hodge Center (122); Spartanburg, SC
January 7, 2026; 6:00 pm, ESPN+		at Presbyterian	W 76–43	14–2 (3–0)	Templeton Center (360); Clinton, SC
January 10, 2026; 2:00 pm, ESPN+		Radford	W 78–40	15–2 (4–0)	Qubein Center (1,613); High Point, NC
January 17, 2026; 2:00 pm, ESPN+		at Longwood	W 68–54	16–2 (5–0)	Joan Perry Brock Center (1,318); Farmville, VA
January 21, 2026; 7:00 pm, ESPN+		Winthrop	W 74–60	17–2 (6–0)	Qubein Center (1,184); High Point, NC
January 23, 2026; 7:00 pm, ESPN+		Gardner–Webb	W 73–44	18–2 (7–0)	Qubein Center (1,124); High Point, NC
January 28, 2026; 6:00 pm, ESPN+		at Charleston Southern	W 87–66	19–2 (8–0)	Buccaneer Field House (345); North Charleston, SC
February 1, 2026; 2:00 pm, ESPN+		Presbyterian	W 70–41	20–2 (9–0)	Qubein Center (484); High Point, NC
February 4, 2026; 6:00 pm, ESPN+		at Winthrop	W 88–74	21–2 (10–0)	Winthrop Coliseum (302); Rock Hill, SC
February 7, 2026; 2:00 pm, ESPN+		at Radford	L 57–72	21–3 (10–1)	Dedmon Center (886); Radford, VA
February 11, 2026; 7:00 pm, ESPN+		Longwood	L 73–75 ^{OT}	21–4 (10–2)	Qubein Center (1,150); High Point, NC
February 14, 2026; 7:00 pm, ESPN+		Charleston Southern	W 64–48	22–4 (11–2)	Qubein Center (1,447); High Point, NC
February 18, 2026; 6:30 pm, ESPN+		at UNC Asheville	W 60–55	23–4 (12–2)	Kimmel Arena (486); Asheville, NC
February 21, 2026; 2:00 pm, ESPN+		at Gardner–Webb	W 83–53	24–4 (13–2)	Paul Porter Arena (670); Boiling Springs, NC
February 28, 2026; 2:00 pm, ESPN+		USC Upstate	L 50–55	24–5 (13–3)	Qubein Center (2,130); High Point, NC
Big South tournament
March 5, 2026; 11:30 am, ESPN+	(1)	vs. (8) USC Upstate; Quarterfinals	W 71–53	25–5	Freedom Hall Civic Center; Johnson City, TN
March 7, 2026; 6:00 pm, ESPN+	(1)	vs. (5) Winthrop; Semifinals	W 79–63	26–5	Freedom Hall Civic Center; Johnson City, TN
March 8, 2026; 6:00 pm, ESPN2	(1)	vs. (2) Radford; Championship	W 71–67	27–5	Freedom Hall Civic Center; Johnson City, TN
NCAA tournament
March 21, 2026*; 7:00 pm, ESPNews	(15 FW1)	at (2 FW1) No. 6 Vanderbilt; First round	L 61–102	27–6	Memorial Gymnasium (5,527); Nashville, TN
*Non-conference game. ^{#}Rankings from AP Poll. (#) Tournament seedings in parentheses. All times are in Eastern.
