= 2025–26 Kent State Golden Flashes women's basketball team =

American college basketball season

2025–26 Kent State Golden Flashes women's basketball
- Conference: Mid-American Conference
- Record: 15–16 (9–9 MAC)
- Head coach: Todd Starkey (10th season)
- Associate head coach: Fran Recchia
- Assistant coaches: Alexa Golden; Paige Salisbury; Mary Dunn
- Home arena: MAC Center

2025–26 Mid-American Conference women's basketball standings
	Conf.				Overall
Team	W		L	PCT	W		L	PCT
Miami (OH) †	16	–	2	.889	28	–	7	.800
Ball State	16	–	2	.889	26	–	7	.788
UMass	15	–	3	.833	23	–	7	.767
Central Michigan	12	–	6	.667	18	–	12	.600
Ohio	11	–	7	.611	18	–	14	.563
Toledo	9	–	9	.500	17	–	15	.531
Bowling Green	9	–	9	.500	17	–	14	.548
Kent State	9	–	9	.500	15	–	16	.484
Eastern Michigan	6	–	12	.333	13	–	16	.448
Western Michigan	5	–	13	.278	9	–	20	.310
Akron	4	–	14	.222	7	–	24	.226
Northern Illinois	4	–	14	.222	7	–	23	.233
Buffalo	1	–	17	.056	3	–	27	.100
† 2026 MAC tournament winner

The 2025–26 Kent State Golden Flashes women's basketball team represented Kent State University during the 2025–26 NCAA Division I women's basketball season. The Golden Flashes, led by tenth-year head coach Todd Starkey, play their home games at the Memorial Athletic and Convocation Center, also known as the MAC Center, in Kent, Ohio as members of the Mid-American Conference.

== Previous season ==
The Golden Flashes finished the 2024–25 season 21–12, 12–6 in MAC play, to finish in fourth place. They defeated Miami (OH), before falling to top-seeded and eventual tournament champions Ball State in the semifinals of the MAC tournament.

== Preseason ==
On October 21, 2025, the Mid-American Conference released their preseason poll. Kent State was picked to finish atop the conference, receiving five first-place votes.

=== Preseason rankings ===
MAC Preseason Poll
Place	Team	Votes
1	Kent State	133 (5)
2	Toledo	118 (2)
3	UMass	115 (3)
4	Ball State	112 (3)
5	Central Michigan	105
6	Bowling Green	101
7	Miami	86
8	Akron	51
9	Western Michigan	48
10	Ohio	44
11	Buffalo	42
12	Eastern Michigan	36
13	Northern Illinois	23
(#) first-place votes

=== Tournament Champions ===
MAC Tournament Champions
Team	Votes
Kent State	5
UMass	3
Toledo	3
Ball State	1
Miami	1

=== Preseason All-MAC Teams ===
Preseason All-MAC Teams
Team	Player	Year
First	Janae Tyler	Junior
Second	Mya Babbitt	Junior

== Roster ==
2025–26 Kent State Golden Flashes women's basketball team
Players
Coaches

Pos.	#	Name	Height	Year	Previous school	Hometown
G	0	Caitlyn Holmes	5 ft 8 in (1.73 m)	Fr	Ellet Community Learning Center	Akron, Ohio
F	1	Tatiana Thomas	5 ft 10 in (1.78 m)	Sr	Bolingbrook High School	Bolingbrook, Illinois
G	2	Meghan Murray	5 ft 5 in (1.65 m)	So	Hampton High School	Hampton, Pennsylvania
G	3	Corynne Hauser	5 ft 7 in (1.7 m)	Sr	Rochester High School	Rochester, Pennsylvania
G	4	Journey Hildebrand	5 ft 11 in (1.8 m)	So	Brunswick High School	Brunswick, Ohio
F	5	Bianca Juzzo	5 ft 11 in (1.8 m)	GS	New Mexico Junior College	Ribeirão Preto, Brazil
G	9	Rylee Kalocay	5 ft 9 in (1.75 m)	Fr	Upper St. Clair High School	Pittsburgh, Pennsylvania
G	11	Anna Campanelli	5 ft 10 in (1.78 m)	Fr	Huntley High School	Huntley, Illinois
G	12	Dionna Gray	5 ft 4 in (1.63 m)	Sr	Huntington High School	Huntington, West Virginia
G	22	Joy Bergstrom	5 ft 9 in (1.75 m)	RS Jr	South Dakota	Mount Prospect, Illinois
G	23	Mya Babbitt	5 ft 8 in (1.73 m)	Jr	Millard South High School	Papillion, Nebraska
C	30	Riley Rismiller	6 ft 4 in (1.93 m)	Jr	Dayton	Coldwater, Ohio
F	34	Janae Tyler	6 ft 1 in (1.85 m)	Jr	Holt High School	Lansing, Michigan
F	35	Emory Klatt	6 ft 1 in (1.85 m)	So	DePaul	Kildeer, Illinois

Head coach

- Todd Starkey (Montreat)

Assistant coach(es)

- Fran Recchia (Virginia Tech)
- Alexa Golden (Kent State)
- Paige Salisbury (Kent State)
- Mary Dunn (Youngstown State)

Legend

- (C) Team captain
- (S) Suspended
- (I) Ineligible
- (W) Walk-on
- Injured
- Current redshirt

Roster
Last update: July 9, 2026

== Schedule and results ==
Date time, TV	Rank^{#}	Opponent^{#}	Result	Record	High points	High rebounds	High assists	Site (attendance) city, state
Exhibition
October 29, 2025*; 7:00 pm		Pitt–Johnstown	W 96–43	–	–	–	–	MAC Center; Kent, OH
Regular season
November 3, 2025*; 6:00 pm, ESPN+		at James Madison; MAC-SBC Challenge	L 48–80	0–1	10 – Tied	12 – Rismiller	2 – Tied	Atlantic Union Bank Center (2,036); Harrisonburg, VA
November 7, 2025*; 7:00 pm, ESPN+		at West Virginia	L 47–88	0–2	13 – Babbitt	6 – Tied	5 – Gray	Hope Coliseum (2,954); Morgantown, WV
November 10, 2025*; 5:00 pm, ESPN+		Walsh	W 79–55	1–2	23 – Babbitt	9 – Thomas	4 – Juzzo	MAC Center (1,185); Kent, OH
November 14, 2025*; 6:30 pm, ESPN+		at Xavier	W 68–60	2–2	16 – Babbitt	12 – Rismiller	4 – Babbitt	Cintas Center (910); Cincinnati, OH
November 16, 2025*; 3:30 pm, ESPN+		Niagara	W 92−45	3−2	24 – Tyler	6 – Rismiller	10 – Gray	MAC Center (1,176); Kent, OH
November 19, 2025*; 6:30 pm, B1G+		at Ohio State	L 68−88	3−3	30 – Babbitt	6 – Thomas	7 – Gray	Value City Arena (4,617); Columbus, OH
November 24, 2025*; 6:00 pm, ESPN+		at Duquesne	L 53–58	3–4	12 – Rismiller	10 – Rismiller	5 – Gray	UPMC Cooper Fieldhouse (984); Pittsburgh, PA
November 28, 2025*; 11:00 am, FloCollege		vs. Tulsa; Nassau Championship Goombay Division semifinals	W 75–69	4–4	28 – Babbitt	8 – Babbitt	4 – Kalocay	Baha Mar Convention Center (217); Nassau, Bahamas
November 30, 2025*; 1:30 pm, FloCollege		vs. Arkansas State; Nassau Championship Goombay Division championship	L 54–74	4–5	17 – Thomas	6 – Tied	6 – Gray	Baha Mar Convention Center (237); Nassau, Bahamas
December 6, 2025*; 1:00 pm, ESPN+		at Marshall	L 62–70	4–6	16 – Tyler	9 – Tied	8 – Gray	Cam Henderson Center (1,067); Huntington, WV
December 15, 2025*; 11:00 am, BoxCast		Davis & Elkins	W 117–37	5–6	19 – Babbitt	10 – Rismiller	7 – Gray	MAC Center (2,067); Kent, OH
December 20, 2025; 2:00 pm, ESPN+		at Bowling Green	L 69−73	5−7 (0–1)	17 – Hauser	10 – Rismiller	5 – Gray	Stroh Center (1,919); Bowling Green, OH
December 31, 2025; 12:00 pm, ESPN+		Miami (OH)	L 63–67	5–8 (0–2)	18 – Thomas	13 – Thomas	2 – Tied	MAC Center (1,124); Kent, OH
January 3, 2026; 3:30 pm, ESPN+		UMass	L 70–75	5–9 (0–3)	20 – Babbitt	11 – Klatt	6 – Thomas	MAC Center (2,449); Kent, OH
January 7, 2026; 11:00 am, ESPN+		at Central Michigan	L 57–66	5–10 (0–4)	24 – Babbitt	7 – Klatt	3 – Tied	McGuirk Arena (2,312); Mount Pleasant, MI
January 10, 2026; 2:00 pm, ESPN+		at Eastern Michigan	W 78–65	6–10 (1–4)	17 – Babbitt	9 – Gray	6 – Gray	George Gervin GameAbove Center (1,165); Ypsilanti, MI
January 14, 2026; 7:00 pm, ESPN+		Ohio	W 71–68	7–10 (2–4)	18 – Babbitt	12 – Klatt	12 – Gray	MAC Center (1,292); Kent, OH
January 17, 2026; 1:00 pm, ESPN+		Akron	W 91–79	8–10 (3–4)	29 – Klatt	6 – Klatt	6 – Gray	MAC Center (1,344); Kent, OH
January 24, 2026; 12:00 pm, ESPN+		at Buffalo	W 84–74	9–10 (4–4)	25 – Rismiller	7 – Babbitt	9 – Gray	Alumni Arena (955); Amherst, NY
January 28, 2026; 7:00 pm, ESPN+		at Toledo	L 53–59	9–11 (4–5)	13 – Rismiller	5 – Gray	4 – Gray	Savage Arena (3,920); Toledo, OH
February 1, 2026; 12:00 pm, CBSSN		Ball State	L 91–101	9–12 (4–6)	28 – Babbitt	9 – Gray	9 – Gray	MAC Center (1,170); Kent, OH
February 4, 2026; 7:00 pm, ESPN+		Bowling Green	W 73–64	10–12 (5–6)	25 – Babbitt	9 – Klatt	4 – Holmes	MAC Center (1,092); Kent, OH
February 7, 2026*; 1:00 pm, ESPN+		Appalachian State; MAC-SBC Challenge	W 68–63	11–12	17 – Hildebrand	9 – Thomas	5 – Gray	MAC Center (1,116); Kent, OH
February 14, 2026; 1:00 pm, ESPN+		at Ohio	L 61–71	11–13 (5–7)	15 – Babbitt	10 – Klatt	11 – Gray	Convocation Center (654); Athens, OH
February 18, 2026; 7:00 pm, ESPN+		Northern Illinois	W 70–67	12–13 (6–7)	16 – Rismiller	7 – Thomas	2 – Tied	MAC Center (1,274); Kent, OH
February 21, 2026; 12:00 pm, ESPN+		at Akron	W 80–61	13–13 (7–7)	20 – Babbitt	10 – Klatt	6 – Gray	James A. Rhodes Arena (1,093); Akron, OH
February 25, 2026; 6:00 pm, ESPN+		at UMass	L 56–66	13–14 (7–8)	11 – Babbitt	14 – Klatt	3 – Babbitt	Mullins Center (1,163); Amherst, MA
February 28, 2026; 1:00 pm, BoxCast		Central Michigan	W 63–56	14–14 (8–8)	15 – Hauser	6 – Tied	2 – Tied	MAC Center (1,297); Kent, OH
March 4, 2026; 7:00 pm, ESPN+		at Miami (OH)	L 52–71	14–15 (8–9)	12 – Hauser	8 – Rismiller	2 – Gray	Millett Hall (1,019); Oxford, OH
March 7, 2026; 1:00 pm, ESPN+		Western Michigan	W 67–60	15–15 (9–9)	27 – Babbitt	6 – Tied	8 – Gray	MAC Center (1,171); Kent, OH
MAC tournament
March 11, 2026; 11:00 am, ESPN+	(8)	vs. (1) Miami (OH); Quarterfinals	L 58–65	15–16	13 – Babbitt	11 – Babbitt	3 – Gray	Rocket Arena; Cleveland, OH
*Non-conference game. ^{#}Rankings from AP Poll. (#) Tournament seedings in parentheses. All times are in Eastern.
