= 2025–26 Winthrop Eagles women's basketball team =

American college basketball season

2025–26 Winthrop Eagles women's basketball
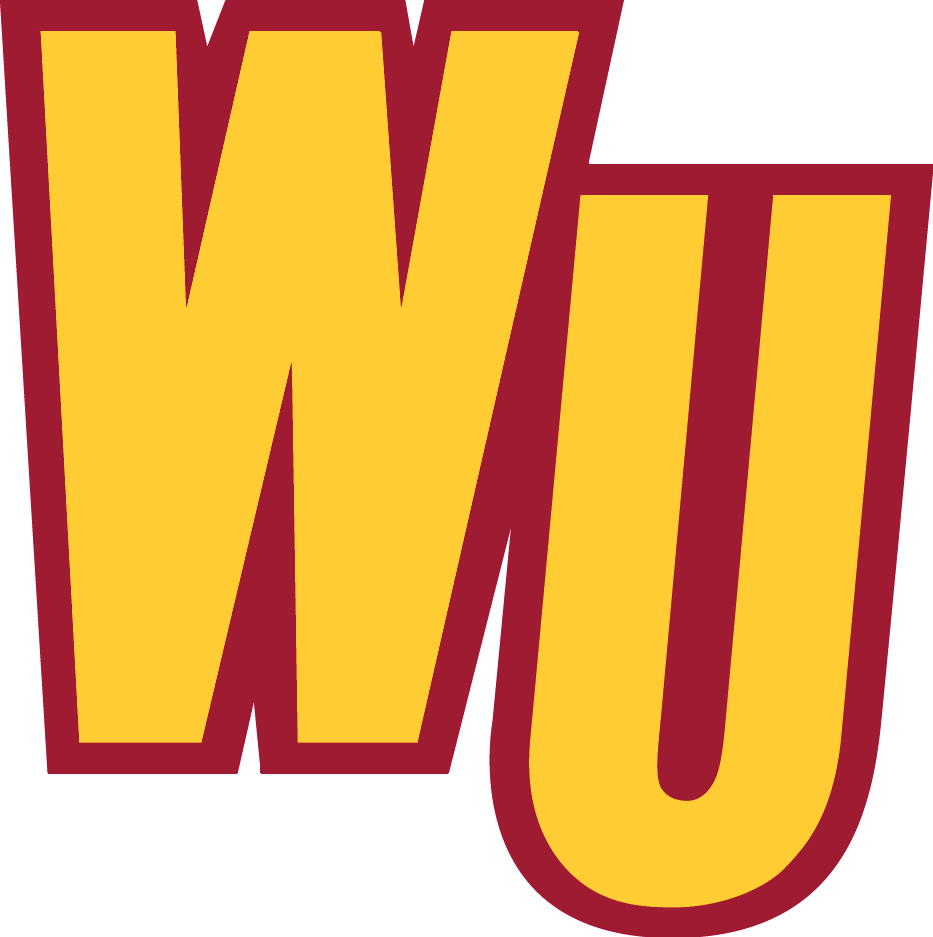
- Conference: Big South Conference
- Record: 15–17 (7–9 Big South)
- Head coach: Semeka Randall Lay (6th season)
- Assistant coaches: Dante Travis; Dominique Duck; Steve Joyner
- Home arena: Winthrop Coliseum

2025–26 Big South women's basketball standings
	Conf.				Overall
Team	W		L	PCT	W		L	PCT
High Point †	13	–	3	.813	27	–	6	.818
Radford	12	–	4	.750	23	–	13	.639
Longwood	11	–	5	.688	21	–	10	.677
Gardner–Webb	9	–	7	.563	12	–	19	.387
Winthrop	7	–	9	.438	15	–	17	.469
UNC Asheville	7	–	9	.438	12	–	18	.400
Charleston Southern	6	–	10	.375	8	–	22	.267
USC Upstate	6	–	10	.375	12	–	20	.375
Presbyterian	1	–	15	.063	3	–	27	.100
† 2026 Big South tournament winner

The 2025–26 Winthrop Eagles women's basketball team represented Winthrop University during the 2025–26 NCAA Division I women's basketball season. The Eagles, led by sixth-year head coach Semeka Randall Lay, played their home games at the Winthrop Coliseum in Rock Hill, South Carolina as members of the Big South Conference.

== Previous season ==
The Eagles finished the 2024–25 season 16–15, 9–7 in Big South play, to finish in sixth place. They defeated Charleston Southern before falling to top-seeded and eventual tournament champions High Point in the semifinals of the Big South tournament.

== Preseason ==
On October 15, 2025, the Big South Conference released their preseason poll. Winthrop was picked to finish fourth in the conference.

=== Preseason rankings ===
Big South Preseason Poll
Place	Team	Votes
1	High Point	77 (6)
2	Longwood	69 (1)
3	Radford	67 (1)
4	Winthrop	48
5	Charleston Southern	41
6	USC Upstate	33
7	Gardner–Webb	25
8	Presbyterian	23
9	UNC Asheville	22 (1)
(#) first-place votes

=== Preseason All-Big South Teams ===
Preseason All-Big South teams
Team	Player	Year	Position
First	Amourie Porter	Junior	Guard/forward

== Roster ==
2025–26 Winthrop Eagles women's basketball team
Players
Coaches

Pos.	#	Name	Height	Year	Previous school	Hometown
G	0	Ar'Mani Reid	5 ft 9 in (1.75 m)	Jr	Southwest Onslow High School	Jacksonville, NC
G	1	Nessa Walsh	5 ft 10 in (1.78 m)	Sr	Purdue Northwest	Chicago, IL
G	3	Madison Ruff	5 ft 9 in (1.75 m)	So	Mount St. Mary's	Sparta, GA
G	5	Mya Hamilton	5 ft 8 in (1.73 m)	Fr	Unioto High School	Leesburg, OH
G	7	Ryiah Wilson	5 ft 8 in (1.73 m)	Fr	Washington High School	South Bend, IN
G	10	Jada Ryce	5 ft 5 in (1.65 m)	GS	East Tennessee State	McDonough, GA
F	11	Naomi Wilson	6 ft 3 in (1.91 m)	Jr	Weatherford College	Baldivis, Australia
G	13	Mya Pierfax	5 ft 9 in (1.75 m)	Sr	Northwest Florida State College	Lake Elsinore, CA
G/F	15	Amourie Porter	5 ft 10 in (1.78 m)	Jr	Cal State Bakersfield	Glen Burnie, MD
G/F	21	Persais Williams	5 ft 9 in (1.75 m)	So	Champaign Central High School	Bolingbrook, IL
G	22	Cori Lard	5 ft 9 in (1.75 m)	Sr	Miami (OH)	Davenport, IA
F	25	Tocarra Johnson	6 ft 0 in (1.83 m)	Jr	Blinn College	Crockett, TX

Head coach

- Semeka Randall Lay (Tennessee)

Assistant coach(es)

- Dante Travis (Saint Paul's)
- Dominique Duck (Western Kentucky)
- Steve Joyner (Johnson C. Smith)

Legend

- (C) Team captain
- (S) Suspended
- (I) Ineligible
- (W) Walk-on
- Injured
- Current redshirt

Roster
Last update: March 3, 2026

== Schedule and results ==
Date time, TV	Rank^{#}	Opponent^{#}	Result	Record	Site (attendance) city, state
Non-conference regular season
November 3, 2025*; 12:00 p.m., ESPN+		at Marquette	L 57–89	0–1	Al McGuire Center (3,750); Milwaukee, WI
November 5, 2025*; 12:00 p.m., NECFR		at Chicago State	L 54–59	0–2	Jones Convocation Center (1,523); Chicago, WI
November 8, 2025*; 2:00 p.m., ESPN+		Newberry	W 74–37	1–2	Winthrop Coliseum (402); Rock Hill, SC
November 15, 2025*; 4:30 p.m., ESPN+		Queens	W 75–69	2–2	Winthrop Coliseum (308); Rock Hill, SC
November 19, 2025*; 7:00 p.m., SECN		at No. 2 South Carolina	L 56−106	2−3	Colonial Life Arena (15,787); Columbia, SC
November 21, 2025*; 1:00 p.m., ESPN+		Clinton	W 82−29	3−3	Winthrop Coliseum (269); Rock Hill, SC
November 25, 2025*; 4:30 p.m., BALLERtv		vs. Southern Illinois; Music City Classic	W 75–61	4–3	Trevecca Trojan Fieldhouse (223); Nashville, TN
November 26, 2025*; 4:30 p.m., BALLERtv		vs. SMU; Music City Classic	L 61–84	4–4	Trevecca Trojan Fieldhouse (208); Nashville, TN
November 30, 2025*; 4:00 p.m.		at South Carolina State	W 66–45	5–4	SHM Memorial Center (175); Orangeburg, SC
December 3, 2025*; 6:00 p.m., ESPN+		Johnson & Wales (NC)	W 105–41	6–4	Winthrop Coliseum (195); Rock Hill, SC
December 7, 2025*; 1:00 p.m., ESPN+		UNC Wilmington	W 78–68	7–4	Winthrop Coliseum (293); Rock Hill, SC
December 14, 2025*; 2:00 p.m., SECN+		at No. 18 Tennessee	L 40−112	7−5	Thompson–Boling Arena (10,091); Knoxville, TN
December 17, 2025*; 11:00 a.m., ESPN+		at Charlotte	L 58–81	7–6	Halton Arena (2,958); Charlotte, NC
December 20, 2025*; 12:00 p.m., ACCNX		at Virginia	L 53–88	7–7	John Paul Jones Arena (4,077); Charlottesville, VA
Big South regular season
December 31, 2025; 2:00 p.m., ESPN+		Gardner–Webb	L 48–54	7–8 (0–1)	Winthrop Coliseum (270); Rock Hill, SC
January 3, 2026; 2:00 p.m., ESPN+		at UNC Asheville	W 59–55	8–8 (1–1)	Kimmel Arena (248); Asheville, NC
January 7, 2026; 7:00 p.m., ESPN+		at USC Upstate	W 66–64	9–8 (2–1)	G. B. Hodge Center (195); Spartanburg, SC
January 10, 2026; 2:00 p.m., ESPN+		Charleston Southern	W 63–54	10–8 (3–1)	Winthrop Coliseum (243); Rock Hill, SC
January 14, 2026; 7:00 p.m., ESPN+		at Longwood	L 79–100	10–9 (3–2)	Joan Perry Brock Center (1,267); Farmville, VA
January 17, 2026; 2:00 p.m., ESPN+		Radford	L 65–67	10–10 (3–3)	Winthrop Coliseum (282); Rock Hill, SC
January 21, 2026; 7:00 p.m., ESPN+		at High Point	L 60–74	10–11 (3–4)	Qubein Center (1,184); High Point, NC
January 28, 2026; 6:00 p.m., ESPN+		Presbyterian	W 74–42	11–11 (4–4)	Winthrop Coliseum (219); Rock Hill, SC
January 31, 2026; 12:00 p.m., ESPN+		at Radford	L 57–61	11–12 (4–5)	Dedmon Center (447); Radford, VA
February 4, 2026; 6:00 p.m., ESPN+		High Point	L 74–88	11–13 (4–6)	Winthrop Coliseum (302); Rock Hill, SC
February 7, 2026; 2:00 p.m., ESPN+		at Gardner–Webb	L 69–72	11–14 (4–7)	Paul Porter Arena (378); Boiling Springs, NC
February 11, 2026; 6:00 p.m., ESPN+		USC Upstate	L 58–67	11–15 (4–8)	Winthrop Coliseum (304); Rock Hill, SC
February 14, 2026; 2:00 p.m., ESPN+		Longwood	W 75–65	12–15 (5–8)	Winthrop Coliseum (297); Rock Hill, SC
February 18, 2026; 6:00 p.m., ESPN+		at Presbyterian	W 72–59	13–15 (6–8)	Templeton Center (233); Clinton, SC
February 25, 2026; 6:00 p.m., ESPN+		UNC Asheville	L 59–64	13–16 (6–9)	Winthrop Coliseum (301); Rock Hill, SC
February 28, 2026; 2:00 p.m., ESPN+		at Charleston Southern	W 77–55	14–16 (7–9)	Buccaneer Field House (382); North Charleston, SC
Big South tournament
March 5, 2026; 2:00 p.m., ESPN+	(5)	vs. (4) Gardner–Webb; Quarterfinals	W 64–52	15–16	Freedom Hall Civic Center (1,523); Johnson City, TN
March 7, 2026; 6:00 p.m., ESPN+	(5)	vs. (1) High Point; Semifinals	L 63–79	15–17	Freedom Hall Civic Center; Johnson City, TN
*Non-conference game. ^{#}Rankings from AP poll. (#) Tournament seedings in parentheses. All times are in Eastern.
