= 2025–26 UNC Asheville Bulldogs women's basketball team =

American college basketball season

2025–26 UNC Asheville Bulldogs women's basketball
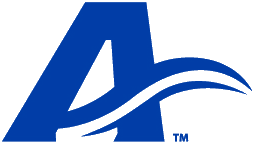
- Conference: Big South Conference
- Record: 12–18 (7–9 Big South)
- Head coach: Tynesha Lewis (2nd season)
- Assistant coaches: Ron Woodard; Quante Lee; Sha-Teisa Sharpe; Mike Moses Jr.
- Home arena: Kimmel Arena

2025–26 Big South women's basketball standings
	Conf.				Overall
Team	W		L	PCT	W		L	PCT
High Point †	13	–	3	.813	27	–	6	.818
Radford	12	–	4	.750	23	–	13	.639
Longwood	11	–	5	.688	21	–	10	.677
Gardner–Webb	9	–	7	.563	12	–	19	.387
Winthrop	7	–	9	.438	15	–	17	.469
UNC Asheville	7	–	9	.438	12	–	18	.400
Charleston Southern	6	–	10	.375	8	–	22	.267
USC Upstate	6	–	10	.375	12	–	20	.375
Presbyterian	1	–	15	.063	3	–	27	.100
† 2026 Big South tournament winner

The 2025–26 UNC Asheville Bulldogs women's basketball team represented the University of North Carolina at Asheville during the 2025–26 NCAA Division I women's basketball season. The Bulldogs, led by second-year head coach Tynesha Lewis, played their home games at Kimmel Arena in Asheville, North Carolina, as members of the Big South Conference.

== Previous season ==
The Bulldogs finished the 2024–25 season 4–27, 1–15 in Big South play, to finish in ninth (last) place. They defeated Presbyterian, before falling to top-seeded and eventual tournament champions High Point in the quarterfinals of the Big South tournament.

== Preseason ==
On October 15, 2025, the Big South Conference released their preseason poll. UNC Asheville was picked to finish ninth (last) in the conference, with one first-place vote.

=== Preseason rankings ===
Big South Preseason Poll
Place	Team	Votes
1	High Point	77 (6)
2	Longwood	69 (1)
3	Radford	67 (1)
4	Winthrop	48
5	Charleston Southern	41
6	USC Upstate	33
7	Gardner–Webb	25
8	Presbyterian	23
9	UNC Asheville	22 (1)
(#) first-place votes

=== Preseason All-Big South Teams ===
No players were named to the First or Second Preseason All-Big South Teams.

== Roster ==
2025–26 UNC Asheville Bulldogs women's basketball team
Players
Coaches

Pos.	#	Name	Height	Year	Previous school	Hometown
G	0	Taliya Council	6 ft 0 in (1.83 m)	RS So	North Carolina A&T	Lumberton, North Carolina
G	1	Journee McDaniel	5 ft 9 in (1.75 m)	Jr	East Carolina	New Bern, North Carolina
G	2	Jamaria Freeman	5 ft 6 in (1.68 m)	Fr	Fike High School	Wilson, North Carolina
G	3	Trinity Fields	5 ft 4 in (1.63 m)	RS So	Brentwood Academy	Old Hickory, Tennessee
G	5	Nia Green	6 ft 0 in (1.83 m)	So	Morgan State	Baltimore, Maryland
F	6	Kristen McMillan	6 ft 1 in (1.85 m)	So	Mississippi Gulf Coast Community College	Birmingham, Alabama
G	7	Aileen Marquez	5 ft 8 in (1.73 m)	Sr	Morehead State	Arden, North Carolina
G	9	D'yanna Maxey	5 ft 7 in (1.7 m)	Sr	Mississippi Valley State	Atlanta, Georgia
F	13	Jazlyn Ware	6 ft 1 in (1.85 m)	So	Stockbridge High School	McDonough, Georgia
F	22	Sara Yarnell	6 ft 2 in (1.88 m)	Fr	Hammond High School	Columbia, Maryland
G	23	Jaidyn Koerdt	5 ft 11 in (1.8 m)	Jr	Coastal Carolina	Providence, Arkansas
F	24	Clementina Odom	6 ft 4 in (1.93 m)	Jr	Tyler Junior College	London, England
F	30	Deborah Orianegbena	6 ft 2 in (1.88 m)	So	Victory Christian Center School	Edo State, Nigeria

Head coach

- Tynesha Lewis (NC State)

Assistant coach(es)

- Ron Woodard (Norfolk State)
- Quante Lee (NC State)
- Sha-Teisa Sharpe (Elizabeth City State)
- Mike Moses Jr. (Fayetteville State)

Legend

- (C) Team captain
- (S) Suspended
- (I) Ineligible
- (W) Walk-on
- Injured
- Current redshirt

Roster
Last update: March 7, 2026

== Schedule and results ==
Date time, TV	Rank^{#}	Opponent^{#}	Result	Record	Site (attendance) city, state
Non-conference regular season
November 3, 2025*; 6:30 pm, ESPN+		Mercer	L 39–48	0–1	Kimmel Arena (189); Asheville, NC
November 6, 2025*; 6:30 pm, ESPN+		Warren Wilson	W 108–44	1–1	Kimmel Arena (246); Asheville, NC
November 13, 2025*; 6:30 pm, ESPN+		at North Carolina Central	L 53–66	1–2	McDougald–McLendon Arena (963); Durham, NC
November 19, 2025*; 5:00 pm, ESPN+		at Western Carolina	W 67–50	2–2	Ramsey Center (802); Cullowhee, NC
November 22, 2025*; 3:30 pm, ESPN+		Appalachian State	L 40–64	2–3	Kimmel Arena (341); Asheville, NC
November 25, 2025*; 4:00 pm, ESPN+		Wofford	L 54−80	2−4	Kimmel Arena (259); Asheville, NC
November 29, 2025*; 2:00 pm, ESPN+		at Furman	L 67−74	2−5	Timmons Arena (303); Greenville, SC
December 3, 2025*; 11:30 am, ESPN+/CW62		South Carolina State	W 64–58 ^{OT}	3–5	Kimmel Arena (1,612); Asheville, NC
December 6, 2025*; 2:00 pm, ESPN+		North Florida	L 61–76	3–6	Kimmel Arena (234); Asheville, NC
December 11, 2025*; 7:00 pm, ESPN+		at East Tennessee State	L 53–63	3–7	Brooks Gymnasium (263); Johnson City, TN
December 14, 2025*; 4:00 pm, ESPN+		at East Carolina	L 61–75	3–8	Williams Arena; Greenville, NC
December 17, 2025*; 6:30 pm, ESPN+		Simmons (KY)	W 94–39	4–8	Kimmel Arena (212); Asheville, NC
December 29, 2025*; 6:00 pm, ESPN+/CW62		Brevard	W 84−31	5−8	Kimmel Arena (267); Asheville, NC
Big South regular season
December 31, 2025; 2:00 pm, ESPN+		at High Point	L 51–78	5–9 (0–1)	Qubein Center (437); High Point, NC
January 3, 2026; 2:00 pm, ESPN+		Winthrop	L 55–59	5–10 (0–2)	Kimmel Arena (248); Asheville, NC
January 7, 2026; 7:00 pm, ESPN+		at Gardner–Webb	W 62–51	6–10 (1–2)	Paul Porter Arena (875); Boiling Springs, NC
January 10, 2026; 2:00 pm, ESPN+		Longwood	L 58–67	6–11 (1–3)	Kimmel Arena (329); Asheville, NC
January 14, 2026; 6:30 pm, ESPN+		Charleston Southern	L 66–72	6–12 (1–4)	Kimmel Arena (582); Asheville, NC
January 17, 2026; 2:00 pm, ESPN+		at Presbyterian	W 64–53	7–12 (2–4)	Templeton Center (282); Clinton, SC
January 21, 2026; 6:30 pm, ESPN+		USC Upstate	W 57–56	8–12 (3–4)	Kimmel Arena (324); Asheville, NC
January 23, 2026; 4:30 pm, ESPN+		at Radford	L 52–64	8–13 (3–5)	Dedmon Center (591); Radford, VA
January 30, 2026; 12:00 pm, ESPN+		Gardner–Webb	L 52–54	8–14 (3–6)	Kimmel Arena (194); Asheville, NC
February 4, 2026; 6:00 pm, ESPN+		at Charleston Southern	W 60–48	9–14 (4–6)	Buccaneer Field House (310); North Charleston, SC
February 7, 2026; 2:00 pm, ESPN+		at Longwood	L 60–72	9–15 (4–7)	Joan Perry Brock Center (1,147); Farmville, VA
February 11, 2026; 6:30 pm, ESPN+		Radford	L 45–73	9–16 (4–8)	Kimmel Arena (373); Asheville, NC
February 14, 2026; 4:00 pm, ESPN+		at USC Upstate	W 63–57	10–16 (5–8)	G. B. Hodge Center (209); Spartanburg, SC
February 18, 2026; 6:30 pm, ESPN+		High Point	L 55–60	10–17 (5–9)	Kimmel Arena (486); Asheville, NC
February 21, 2026; 2:00 pm, ESPN+		Presbyterian	W 76–58	11–17 (6–9)	Kimmel Arena (547); Asheville, NC
February 25, 2026; 6:00 pm, ESPN+		at Winthrop	W 64–59	12–17 (7–9)	Winthrop Coliseum (301); Rock Hill, SC
Big South tournament
March 5, 2026; 8:30 pm, ESPN+	(6)	vs. (3) Longwood; Quarterfinals	L 58–72	12–18	Freedom Hall Civic Center (1,208); Johnson City, TN
*Non-conference game. ^{#}Rankings from AP Poll. (#) Tournament seedings in parentheses. All times are in Eastern.
