= 2025–26 Gardner–Webb Runnin' Bulldogs women's basketball team =

American college basketball season

2025–26 Gardner–Webb Runnin' Bulldogs women's basketball
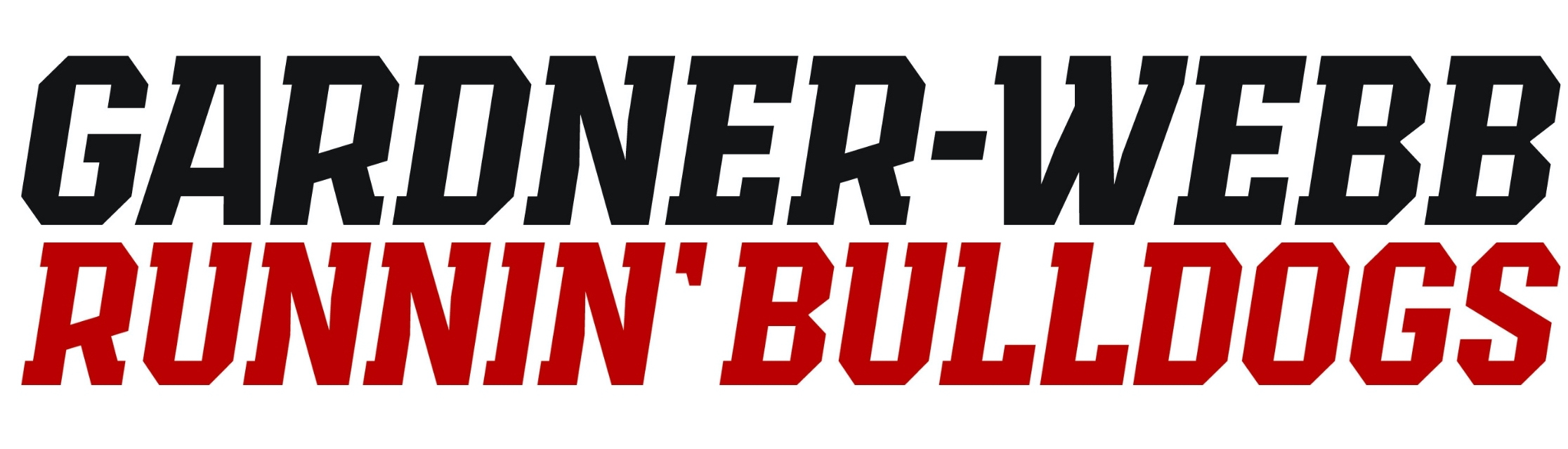
- Conference: Big South Conference
- Record: 12–19 (9–7 Big South)
- Head coach: Terri Williams (1st season)
- Assistant coaches: RubyLee Wright; Alasia Smith; Madison Green
- Home arena: Paul Porter Arena

2025–26 Big South women's basketball standings
	Conf.				Overall
Team	W		L	PCT	W		L	PCT
High Point †	13	–	3	.813	27	–	6	.818
Radford	12	–	4	.750	23	–	13	.639
Longwood	11	–	5	.688	21	–	10	.677
Gardner–Webb	9	–	7	.563	12	–	19	.387
Winthrop	7	–	9	.438	15	–	17	.469
UNC Asheville	7	–	9	.438	12	–	18	.400
Charleston Southern	6	–	10	.375	8	–	22	.267
USC Upstate	6	–	10	.375	12	–	20	.375
Presbyterian	1	–	15	.063	3	–	27	.100
† 2026 Big South tournament winner

The 2025–26 Gardner–Webb Runnin' Bulldogs women's basketball team represents Gardner–Webb University during the 2025–26 NCAA Division I women's basketball season. The Runnin' Bulldogs, led by first-year head coach Terri Williams, play their home games at Paul Porter Arena in Boiling Springs, North Carolina as members of the Big South Conference.

== Previous season ==
The Runnin' Bulldogs finished the 2024–25 season 11–18, 8–8 in Big South play, to finish in sixth place. They were defeated by Radford in the quarterfinals of the Big South tournament.

During the season, on February 6, 2025, it was announced that head coach Scott Merritt was dismissed as head coach, in the middle of his second season, without a reason immediately given, with assistant coach Katie Nelson being named acting head coach for the remainder of the season. Following the season, on April 4, the school announced that they would be hiring former Auburn head coach and Penn State associate head coach Terri Williams as the team's new head coach.

== Preseason ==
On October 15, 2025, the Big South Conference released their preseason poll. Gardner–Webb was picked to finish seventh in the conference.

=== Preseason rankings ===
Big South Preseason Poll
Place	Team	Votes
1	High Point	77 (6)
2	Longwood	69 (1)
3	Radford	67 (1)
4	Winthrop	48
5	Charleston Southern	41
6	USC Upstate	33
7	Gardner–Webb	25
8	Presbyterian	23
9	UNC Asheville	22 (1)
(#) first-place votes

=== Preseason All-Big South Teams ===
Preseason All-Big South Teams
Team	Player	Year	Position
Second	Anaya Harris	Junior	Guard

== Roster ==
2025–26 Gardner–Webb Runnin' Bulldogs women's basketball team
Players
Coaches

Pos.	#	Name	Height	Year	Previous school	Hometown
G	1	Kayla Martin	5 ft 8 in (1.73 m)	RS So	St. Francis Prep	Cambria Heights, New York
G	2	Amina Gray	5 ft 6 in (1.68 m)	Jr	Example Academy	DeKalb, Illinois
G	3	Makayla Legette	5 ft 7 in (1.7 m)	Fr	Trinity Collegiate School	Latta, South Carolina
G	5	Rafferty Powell	5 ft 8 in (1.73 m)	Fr	St Andrew's College	Christchurch, New Zealand
G	8	Anaya Harris	5 ft 9 in (1.75 m)	Jr	North Raleigh Christian Academy	Raleigh, North Carolina
G	10	Nyla Walker	5 ft 4 in (1.63 m)	Sr	USC Upstate	Frankfort, Illinois
G/F	11	Sara Menendez	6 ft 0 in (1.83 m)	Fr	Nou Basquet Femeni Castello	Valencia, Spain
G	12	Anna Baraldi	5 ft 8 in (1.73 m)	Sr	Wingate	Rome, Italy
F	22	Amira Ofunniyin	6 ft 0 in (1.83 m)	Jr	Maryland Eastern Shore	Raleigh, North Carolina
G	23	Kiarra Handley	5 ft 5 in (1.65 m)	Fr	Richmond High School	Richmond, Indiana
G	24	Jaelyn Acker	5 ft 8 in (1.73 m)	RS Sr	Furman	Richfield, Wisconsin
F	32	Regina Yáñez Enriquez	6 ft 3 in (1.91 m)	So	Cushing Academy	Mexico City, Mexico

Head coach

- Terri Williams (Penn State)

Assistant coach(es)

- RubyLee Wright (Georgetown)
- Alasia Smith (Memphis)
- Madison Green (James Madison)

Legend

- (C) Team captain
- (S) Suspended
- (I) Ineligible
- (W) Walk-on
- Injured
- Current redshirt

Roster
Last update: March 2, 2026

== Schedule and results ==
Date time, TV	Rank^{#}	Opponent^{#}	Result	Record	Site (attendance) city, state
Non-conference regular season
November 3, 2025*; 7:00 pm, ESPN+		at Queens	L 47–58	0–1	Curry Arena (326); Charlotte, NC
November 8, 2025*; 2:00 pm, ESPN+		at West Georgia	L 68–91	0–2	The Coliseum (423); Carrollton, GA
November 10, 2025*; 7:00 pm, ESPN+		at Mercer	L 56–61	0–3	Hawkins Arena (407); Macon, GA
November 13, 2025*; 6:00 pm, ACCNX		at Virginia Tech	L 51–87	0–4	Cassell Coliseum (3,951); Blacksburg, VA
November 16, 2025*; 2:00 pm, ESPN+		Hampton	W 55–35	1–4	Paul Porter Arena (140); Boiling Springs, NC
November 19, 2025*; 7:00 pm, ESPN+		UNC Wilmington	W 65−56	2−4	Paul Porter Arena (275); Boiling Springs, NC
November 21, 2025*; 7:00 pm, ESPN+		at UNC Greensboro	L 52−54	2−5	Bodford Arena (538); Greensboro, NC
November 29, 2025*; 12:00 pm		vs. Jackson State; Coastal Carolina Tournament	L 55–76	2–6	HTC Center (56); Conway, SC
November 30, 2025*; 1:00 pm, ESPN+		at Coastal Carolina; Coastal Carolina Tournament	L 57–108	2–7	HTC Center (604); Conway, SC
December 1, 2025*; 7:00 pm, ESPN+		Appalachian State	L 53–63	2–8	Paul Porter Arena (450); Boiling Springs, NC
December 4, 2025*; 7:00 pm, ESPN+		Wofford	L 41–58	2–9	Paul Porter Arena (127); Boiling Springs, NC
December 13, 2025*; 2:00 pm, ESPN+		Western Carolina	W 77–62	3–9	Paul Porter Arena (345); Boiling Springs, NC
December 18, 2025*; 7:00 pm, ESPN+		at East Tennessee State	L 37−59	3−10	Brooks Gymnasium (359); Johnson City, TN
December 22, 2025*; 1:00 pm, ACCNX		at Wake Forest	L 66–78	3–11	LJVM Coliseum (1,049); Winston-Salem, NC
Big South regular season
December 31, 2025; 2:00 pm, ESPN+		at Winthrop	W 54–48	4–11 (1–0)	Winthrop Coliseum (270); Rock Hill, SC
January 7, 2026; 7:00 pm, ESPN+		UNC Asheville	L 51–62	4–12 (1–1)	Paul Porter Arena (875); Boiling Springs, NC
January 10, 2026; 2:00 pm, ESPN+		USC Upstate	W 64–61	5–12 (2–1)	Paul Porter Arena (450); Boiling Springs, NC
January 14, 2026; 7:00 pm, ESPN+		at Radford	L 38–53	5–13 (2–2)	Dedmon Center (572); Radford, VA
January 17, 2026; 2:00 pm, ESPN+		at Charleston Southern	W 52–45	6–13 (3–2)	Buccaneer Field House (522); North Charleston, SC
January 21, 2026; 7:00 pm, ESPN+		Presbyterian	L 46–50	6–14 (3–3)	Paul Porter Arena (234); Boiling Springs, NC
January 23, 2026; 7:00 pm, ESPN+		at High Point	L 44–73	6–15 (3–4)	Qubein Center (1,124); High Point, NC
January 28, 2026; 7:00 pm, ESPN+		Longwood	L 70–76	6–16 (3–5)	Paul Porter Arena (456); Boiling Springs, NC
January 30, 2026; 12:00 pm, ESPN+		at UNC Asheville	W 54–52	7–16 (4–5)	Kimmel Arena (194); Asheville, NC
February 7, 2026; 2:00 pm, ESPN+		Winthrop	W 72–69	8–16 (5–5)	Paul Porter Arena (378); Boiling Springs, NC
February 11, 2026; 7:00 pm, ESPN+		Charleston Southern	W 56–44	9–16 (6–5)	Paul Porter Arena (378); Boiling Springs, NC
February 14, 2026; 2:00 pm, ESPN+		at Presbyterian	W 62–50	10–16 (7–5)	Templeton Center (287); Clinton, SC
February 18, 2026; 7:00 pm, ESPN+		at Longwood	W 53–51	11–16 (8–5)	Joan Perry Brock Center (1,036); Farmville, VA
February 21, 2026; 2:00 pm, ESPN+		High Point	L 53–83	11–17 (8–6)	Paul Porter Arena (670); Boiling Springs, NC
February 25, 2026; 7:00 pm, ESPN+		at USC Upstate	W 52–51	12–17 (9–6)	G. B. Hodge Center (351); Spartanburg, SC
February 28, 2026; 2:00 pm, ESPN+		Radford	L 59–65	12–18 (9–7)	Paul Porter Arena (379); Boiling Springs, NC
Big South tournament
March 5, 2026; 2:00 pm, ESPN+	(4)	vs. (5) Winthrop; Quarterfinals	L 52–64	12–19	Freedom Hall Civic Center (1,523); Johnson City, TN
*Non-conference game. ^{#}Rankings from AP Poll. (#) Tournament seedings in parentheses. All times are in Eastern.
