= 2025–26 USC Upstate Spartans women's basketball team =

American college basketball season

2025–26 USC Upstate Spartans women's basketball
- Conference: Big South Conference
- Record: 12–20 (6–10 Big South)
- Head coach: Jason Williams (4th season)
- Assistant coaches: Jennifer DeGraaf; Molly Glick; Isaac Mills; Bryanna Brady
- Home arena: G. B. Hodge Center

2025–26 Big South women's basketball standings
	Conf.				Overall
Team	W		L	PCT	W		L	PCT
High Point †	13	–	3	.813	27	–	6	.818
Radford	12	–	4	.750	23	–	13	.639
Longwood	11	–	5	.688	21	–	10	.677
Gardner–Webb	9	–	7	.563	12	–	19	.387
Winthrop	7	–	9	.438	15	–	17	.469
UNC Asheville	7	–	9	.438	12	–	18	.400
Charleston Southern	6	–	10	.375	8	–	22	.267
USC Upstate	6	–	10	.375	12	–	20	.375
Presbyterian	1	–	15	.063	3	–	27	.100
† 2026 Big South tournament winner

The 2025–26 USC Upstate Spartans women's basketball team represented the University of South Carolina Upstate during the 2025–26 NCAA Division I women's basketball season. The Spartans, led by fourth-year head coach Jason Williams, played their home games at the G. B. Hodge Center in Spartanburg, South Carolina as members of the Big South Conference.

== Previous season ==
The Spartans finished the 2024–25 season 9–21, 6–10 in Big South play, to finish in ninth (last) place. They were defeated by Longwood in the quarterfinals of the Big South tournament.

== Preseason ==
On October 15, 2025, the Big South Conference released their preseason poll. USC Upstate was picked to finish sixth in the conference.

=== Preseason rankings ===
Big South Preseason Poll
Place	Team	Votes
1	High Point	77 (6)
2	Longwood	69 (1)
3	Radford	67 (1)
4	Winthrop	48
5	Charleston Southern	41
6	USC Upstate	33
7	Gardner–Webb	25
8	Presbyterian	23
9	UNC Asheville	22 (1)
(#) first-place votes

=== Preseason All-Big South Teams ===
Preseason All-Big South Teams
Team	Player	Year	Position
Second	Cassie Gallagher	(redshirt) Sophomore	Guard

== Roster ==
2025–26 USC Upstate Spartans women's basketball team
Players
Coaches

Pos.	#	Name	Height	Year	Previous school	Hometown
F	0	Zora Fray-Chinn	5 ft 11 in (1.8 m)	RS Sr	Wright State	Orlando, Florida
G	2	Macy Wike	5 ft 9 in (1.75 m)	Jr	Asheville Christian Academy	Cullowhee, North Carolina
G	3	Gwen Jenkins	5 ft 9 in (1.75 m)	So	Dublin Coffman High School	Columbus, Ohio
G	4	Kinley Paterson	5 ft 7 in (1.7 m)	Fr	Melville Senior High School	Perth, Australia
G	5	Lexi Castator	6 ft 1 in (1.85 m)	So	Valparaiso	Fort Wayne, Indiana
G	6	Ylenia Expósito Pérez	5 ft 7 in (1.7 m)	GS	Missouri Valley College	Santa Cruz de Tenerife, Spain
F	13	Aijah Palmore	6 ft 1 in (1.85 m)	GS	Barry	Greensboro, North Carolina
G	22	Gracie Barnes	5 ft 9 in (1.75 m)	Jr	Cincinnati Country Day School	Cincinnati, Ohio
G	24	Jessa Troy	5 ft 6 in (1.68 m)	Fr	Penn High School	Granger, Indiana
G	25	Cassie Gallagher	5 ft 11 in (1.8 m)	RS So	Cookeville High School	Cookeville, Tennessee
F	32	Madison Miller	6 ft 4 in (1.93 m)	RS Fr	Morris Catholic High School	Hamburg, New Jersey
F	33	Zoe Richardson	6 ft 1 in (1.85 m)	So	Siena	Auckland, New Zealand
F	34	Vera Söderblom	6 ft 3 in (1.91 m)	RS Jr	Luleå Gymnasieskola	Gothenburg, Sweden
G	35	Aubrie Kierscht	5 ft 6 in (1.68 m)	RS Jr	Presbyterian	Salina, Kansas
F	42	Emma Blair	6 ft 2 in (1.88 m)	RS So	Greater Latrobe High School	Latrobe, Pennsylvania

Head coach

- Jason Williams (Greensboro)

Assistant coach(es)

- Jennifer DeGraaf (UNC Wilmington)
- Molly Glick (Northern Kentucky)
- Isaac Mills (Wisconsin)
- Bryanna Brady (Presbyterian)

Legend

- (C) Team captain
- (S) Suspended
- (I) Ineligible
- (W) Walk-on
- Injured
- Current redshirt

Roster
Last update: March 8, 2026

== Schedule and results ==
Date time, TV	Rank^{#}	Opponent^{#}	Result	Record	Site (attendance) city, state
Non-conference regular season
November 3, 2025*; 11:00 am, ACCNX		at Clemson	L 38–76	0–1	Littlejohn Coliseum (5,839); Clemson, SC
November 6, 2025*; 7:00 pm, ESPN+/WHNS		Erskine	W 76–54	1–1	G. B. Hodge Center (301); Spartanburg, SC
November 10, 2025*; 6:30 pm, SECN+		at Georgia	L 44–78	1–2	Stegeman Coliseum (1,406); Athens, GA
November 12, 2025*; 6:30 pm, SECN+		at No. 23 Kentucky	L 30–90	1–3	Memorial Coliseum (4,060); Lexington, KY
November 17, 2025*; 7:00 pm, ESPN+		South Carolina State	W 78–69	2–3	G. B. Hodge Center (349); Spartanburg, SC
November 21, 2025*; 12:00 pm		vs. Marshall; Morehead State MTE	L 54−85	2−4	Ellis Johnson Arena (106); Morehead, KY
November 22, 2025*; 12:00 pm, ESPN+		at Morehead State; Morehead State MTE	L 64−78	2−5	Ellis Johnson Arena (310); Morehead, KY
November 25, 2025*; 4:00 pm, ESPN+		Montreat	W 96–37	3–5	G. B. Hodge Center (167); Spartanburg, SC
November 28, 2025*; 7:00 pm, ESPN+		at Kennesaw State	L 41–55	3–6	VyStar Arena (471); Kennesaw, GA
December 3, 2025*; 11:00 am, ESPN+		at Western Carolina	W 55–44	4–6	Ramsey Center (1,891); Cullowhee, NC
December 6, 2025*; 4:30 pm, ESPN+		UNC Greensboro	L 39–70	4–7	G. B. Hodge Center (230); Spartanburg, SC
December 14, 2025*; 2:00 pm, ESPN+/WYCW		Samford	L 67–74	4–8	G. B. Hodge Center (206); Spartanburg, SC
December 17, 2025*; 11:00 am, ESPN+		Agnes Scott	W 112−39	5−8	G. B. Hodge Center (818); Spartanburg, SC
December 20, 2025*; 2:00 pm, ESPN+		at Queens	L 35–60	5–9	Curry Arena (222); Charlotte, NC
Big South regular season
December 31, 2025; 3:00 pm, ESPN+		at Charleston Southern	L 49–60	5–10 (0–1)	Buccaneer Field House (72); North Charleston, SC
January 3, 2026; 4:00 pm, ESPN+		High Point	L 58–72	5–11 (0–2)	G. B. Hodge Center (122); Spartanburg, SC
January 7, 2026; 7:00 pm, ESPN+		Winthrop	L 64–66	5–12 (0–3)	G. B. Hodge Center (195); Spartanburg, SC
January 10, 2026; 2:00 pm, ESPN+		at Gardner–Webb	L 61–64	5–13 (0–4)	Paul Porter Arena (450); Boiling Springs, NC
January 14, 2026; 7:00 pm, ESPN+		Presbyterian	W 58–38	6–13 (1–4)	G. B. Hodge Center (287); Spartanburg, SC
January 21, 2026; 6:30 pm, ESPN+		at UNC Asheville	L 56–57	6–14 (1–5)	Kimmel Arena (324); Asheville, NC
January 23, 2026; 2:00 pm, ESPN+		at Longwood	L 50–74	6–15 (1–6)	Joan Perry Brock Center (873); Farmville, VA
January 28, 2026; 7:00 pm, ESPN+		Radford	L 29–67	6–16 (1–7)	G. B. Hodge Center (219); Spartanburg, SC
January 30, 2026; 6:00 pm, ESPN+		Charleston Southern	L 62–85	6–17 (1–8)	G. B. Hodge Center (124); Spartanburg, SC
February 4, 2026; 6:00 pm, ESPN+		at Presbyterian	W 70–63	7–17 (2–8)	Templeton Center (220); Clinton, SC
February 11, 2026; 6:00 pm, ESPN+		at Winthrop	W 67–58	8–17 (3–8)	Winthrop Coliseum (304); Rock Hill, SC
February 14, 2026; 4:00 pm, ESPN+		UNC Asheville	L 57–63	8–18 (3–9)	G. B. Hodge Center (209); Spartanburg, SC
February 18, 2026; 7:00 pm, ESPN+		at Radford	W 57–52	9–18 (4–9)	Dedmon Center (568); Radford, VA
February 21, 2026; 2:00 pm, ESPN+		Longwood	W 65–63 ^{2OT}	10–18 (5–9)	G. B. Hodge Center (251); Spartanburg, SC
February 25, 2026; 7:00 pm, ESPN+		Gardner–Webb	L 51–52	10–19 (5–10)	G. B. Hodge Center (351); Spartanburg, SC
February 28, 2026; 2:00 pm, ESPN+		at High Point	W 55–50	11–19 (6–10)	Qubein Center (2,130); High Point, NC
Big South tournament
March 4, 2026; 5:00 pm, ESPN+	(8)	vs. (9) Presbyterian; First Round	W 60–48	12–19	Freedom Hall Civic Center; Johnson City, TN
March 5, 2026; 11:30 am, ESPN+	(8)	vs. (1) High Point; Quarterfinals	L 53–71	12–20	Freedom Hall Civic Center; Johnson City, TN
*Non-conference game. ^{#}Rankings from AP Poll. (#) Tournament seedings in parentheses. All times are in Eastern.
