= 2025–26 Ohio Bobcats women's basketball team =

Intercollegiate basketball season

2025–26 Ohio Bobcats women's basketball

WNIT, First Round
- Conference: Mid-American Conference
- Record: 18–14 (11–7 MAC)
- Head coach: Bob Boldon (13th season)
- Assistant coaches: Tavares Jackson; Chelsea Welch; Kaylee Gregory Bambule; Abby Garnett
- Home arena: Convocation Center

2025–26 Mid-American Conference women's basketball standings
	Conf.				Overall
Team	W		L	PCT	W		L	PCT
Miami (OH) †	16	–	2	.889	28	–	7	.800
Ball State	16	–	2	.889	26	–	7	.788
UMass	15	–	3	.833	23	–	7	.767
Central Michigan	12	–	6	.667	18	–	12	.600
Ohio	11	–	7	.611	18	–	14	.563
Toledo	9	–	9	.500	17	–	15	.531
Bowling Green	9	–	9	.500	17	–	14	.548
Kent State	9	–	9	.500	15	–	16	.484
Eastern Michigan	6	–	12	.333	13	–	16	.448
Western Michigan	5	–	13	.278	9	–	20	.310
Akron	4	–	14	.222	7	–	24	.226
Northern Illinois	4	–	14	.222	7	–	23	.233
Buffalo	1	–	17	.056	3	–	27	.100
† 2026 MAC tournament winner

The 2025–26 Ohio Bobcats women's basketball team represented Ohio University during the 2025–26 NCAA Division I women's basketball season. The Bobcats, led by thirteenth-year head coach Bob Boldon, played their home games at the Convocation Center in Athens, Ohio as a member of the Mid-American Conference.

They finished the 2025–26 season 11–7 in MAC play, to finish in 5th place. They qualified for the MAC tournament as the 5th seed, where they defeated Central Michigan in the quarterfinals before losing to top seeded Miami in the semifinals.

Ohio accepted a WNIT bid, where they lost in the first round to UMBC to end the season at 18–14.

== Previous season ==
The team finished 6–23 and 4–14 in MAC play, to finish tied for eleventh in the MAC. They failed to qualify for the MAC tournament.

== Offseason ==
=== Departures ===
Departures
Name	Number	Pos.	Height	Year	Hometown	Reason
Kate Dennis	14	G	6'1"	Sr.	Rockford, IL	Exhausted eligibility
Jaya McClure	0	G	5'6"	Jr.	Louisville, KY	Transferred to UIC
Emma Barnett	34	F	6'1"	So.	Mount Washington, KY	Transferred to Lindsey Wilson
Kennedi Watkins	5	G	5'10"	Sr.	Ballwin, MO	Exhausted eligibility
Anyssa Jones	3	G	5'10"	Gr.	Westerville, OH	Exhausted eligibility
Kiersten Cashell	31	F	5'11"	So.	Hilliard, OH	
Olivia Rinard	36	G	5'5"	Fr.	Williamstown, WV	

=== Incoming transfers ===
Incoming transfers
Name	Number	Pos.	Height	Year	Hometown	Reason
Elli Garnett		F	5'11"	Gr.	Lakewood, CO	Transferred from Nicholls State
Antonicia Moultrie		G	5'9"	Jr.	Nassau, Bahamas	Transferred from Garden City CC
Bella Ranallo		G		So.	Lake Forest, IL	Transferred from Clemson

=== 2025 recruiting class ===
Recruiting class
Name	Number	Pos.	Height	High school	Hometown
Arianna Jennings		G	5'11"	Harker Heights	Killeen, TX
Vivienne Macheck		G	5'10"	UNITED School of Sports	Embrach, Switzerland

== Preseason ==
On October 21, 2025 the MAC released the preseason coaches poll. Ohio was picked to finish tenth in the MAC regular season. Ohio received zero first place votes and no votes to win the MAC Tournament.

=== Preseason rankings ===
MAC preseason poll
Predicted finish	Team	Votes (1st place)
1.	Kent State	133 (5)
2.	Toledo	118 (2)
3.	UMass	115 (3)
4.	Ball State	112 (3)
5.	Central Michigan	105
6.	Bowling Green	101
7.	Miami	86
8.	Akron	51
9.	Western Michigan	48
10.	Ohio	44
11.	Buffalo	42
12.	Eastern Michigan	36
13.	Northern Illinois	23

MAC tournament champions: Kent State (5), UMass (3), Toledo (3), Ball State (1), Miami (1)

== Roster ==
2025–26 Ohio Bobcats women's basketball team
Players
Coaches

Pos.	#	Name	Height	Year	Previous school	Hometown
G	2	ReRe Jennings	5 ft 11 in (1.8 m)	Fr	Harker Heights	Killeen, TX
G	3	Bella Ranallo	5 ft 6 in (1.68 m)	RS So	Lake Forest	Lake Forest, IL
G	4	Aliah McWhorter	6 ft 1 in (1.85 m)	GS	Sycamore	Cincinnati, OH
G	5	Vivienne Macheck	5 ft 10 in (1.78 m)	Fr	UNITED School of Sports	Embrach,Switzerland
F	8	Elli Garnett	5 ft 11 in (1.8 m)	GS	Golden	Lakewood, CO
G	11	Antonicia Moultrie	5 ft 9 in (1.75 m)	Jr	Saint Augustine's	Nassau, Bahamas
G	13	Monica Williams	5 ft 9 in (1.75 m)	RS So	Lawrence North	Indianapolis, IN
G	20	Gigi Bower	5 ft 9 in (1.75 m)	So	Olentangy	Powell, OH
G	21	Bailey Tabeling	5 ft 10 in (1.78 m)	Jr	Trinity Lutheran	Seymour, IN
G	22	Asiah Baxter	5 ft 11 in (1.8 m)	Jr	Warren Central	Indianapolis, IN
F	23	Danni Scully	6 ft 1 in (1.85 m)	So	Nazareth Academy	Park Ridge, IL
F	24	Aja Austin	6 ft 1 in (1.85 m)	Sr		Westerville, OH
G	30	Madison Lim	5 ft 10 in (1.78 m)	RS So	Mechanicsburg	Marysville, OH
F	41	Cassidy Lafler	5 ft 11 in (1.8 m)	Sr	Dublin Coffman	Dublin, OH

Head coach

- Bob Boldon (Walsh)

Assistant coach(es)

- Tavares Jackson (Minnesota)
- Chelsea Welch (Wright State)
- Kaylee Gregory Bambule (Ohio)
- Abby Garnett (Ohio)

Legend

- (C) Team captain
- (S) Suspended
- (I) Ineligible
- (W) Walk-on
- Injured
- Current redshirt

Roster
Last update: October 28, 2025

=== Support staff ===
2025–26 Ohio Bobcats support staff
- Ebony Pegues – director of basketball operations
- Becca Gaddy – director of athletics communications (volleyball, women's basketball, cross country/track & field, baseball)
- Brooke Bolduc – assistant strength and conditioning coach (soccer, WBB)
- Morgan Hall – staff athletic trainer
- Jessica Arquette – Ohio athletics sports dietitian
- Kaitlyn Michener – nutritionist
- Hannah Rastatter – nutritionist

== Schedule ==
Date time, TV	Rank^{#}	Opponent^{#}	Result	Record	High points	High rebounds	High assists	Site (attendance) city, state
Non-conference regular season
November 3, 2025*; 8:00 p.m., ESPN+		at Texas State; MAC-SBC Challenge	W 72–66	1–0	27 – Garnett	6 – Baxter	4 – Tabeling	Strahan Arena (781); San Marcos, TX
November 9, 2025*; 12:00 p.m., ESPN+		Columbia	L 74–92	1–1	18 – Ranallo	5 – McWhorter	4 – Tabeling	Convocation Center (565); Athens, OH
November 13, 2025*; 11:00 a.m., ESPN+		Morehead State	W 76–60	2–1	18 – McWhorter	9 – Baxter	5 – Tabeling	Convocation Center (2,000); Athens, OH
November 20, 2025*; 6:30 p.m., ESPN+		at Xavier	L 53–74	2–2	15 – McWhorter	6 – Jennings	4 – Tabeling	Cintas Center (964); Cincinnati, OH
November 24, 2025*; 7:00 p.m., ESPN+		Wright State	W 89–66	3–2	19 – Tabeling	7 – Garnett	3 – Tied	Convocation Center (541); Athens, OH
November 30, 2025*; 1:00 p.m., ESPN+		at Davidson	L 59–64	3–3	15 – Ranallo	6 – Ranallo	2 – Ranallo	John M. Belk Arena (835); Davidson, NC
December 5, 2025*; 7:00 p.m., ESPN+		UIC	W 72–70	4–3	18 – Ranallo	7 – Ranallo	6 – Ranallo	Convocation Center (2,500); Athens, OH
December 13, 2025*; 2:00 p.m., ESPN+		at Radford	W 72–67	5–3	18 – Ranallo	13 – Garnett	Tabeling –	Dedmon Center (6); Radford, VA
December 20, 2025*; 1:00 p.m., ESPN+		Saint Louis	L 74–80	5–4	20 – Tabeling	9 – Baxter	3 – Williams	Convocation Center (528); Athens, OH
December 28, 2025*; 1:00 p.m., ESPN+		Wilberforce	W 96–64	6–4	19 – Bower	8 – Scully	4 – Jennings	Convocation Center (368); Athens, OH
MAC regular season
December 31, 2025; 1:00 p.m., ESPN+		at Central Michigan	W 85–83 ^{OT}	7–4 (1–0)	22 – Ranallo	8 – Tied	5 – Garnett	McGuirk Arena (1414); Mount Pleasant, MI
January 3, 2026; 1:00 p.m., ESPN+		Akron	W 73–56	8–4 (2–0)	16 – Tabeling	8 – Garnett	4 – Tied	Convocation Center (513); Athens, OH
January 7, 2026; 7:00 p.m., ESPN+		Eastern Michigan	W 96–87	9–4 (3–0)	21 – Tabeling	6 – Baxter	6 – Williams	Convocation Center (419); Athens, OH
January 10, 2026; 2:00 p.m., ESPN+		at Buffalo	W 71–59	10–4 (4–0)	14 – Tied	6 – Williams	7 – Tabeling	Alumni Arena (1005); Amherst, NY
January 14, 2026; 7:00 p.m., ESPN+		at Kent State	L 68–71	10–5 (4–1)	12 – Tied	7 – Baxter	4 – Tabeling	MAC Center (1292); Kent, OH
January 17, 2026; 1:00 p.m., ESPN+		Northern Illinois	W 66–62	11–5 (5–1)	15 – Tabeling	8 – Scully	3 – Moultrie	Convocation Center (661); Athens, OH
January 21, 2026; 7:00 p.m., ESPN+		at Bowling Green	W 82–57	12–5 (6–1)	26 – Ranallo	8 – Tabeling	5 – Tabeling	Stroh Center (1601); Bowling Green, OH
January 24, 2026; 1:00 p.m., ESPN+		Toledo	L 66–75	12–6 (6–2)	15 – Tabeling	4 – Tied	2 – Tied	Convocation Center (500); Athens, OH
January 28, 2026; 7:00 p.m., ESPN+		UMass	L 76–85	12–7 (6–3)	17 – Bower	5 – Moultrie	4 – Tabeling	Convocation Center (692); Athens, OH
January 31, 2026; 1:00 p.m., ESPN+		at Miami (OH)	L 70–90	12–8 (6–4)	15 – Tied	9 – Scully	3 – Tied	Millett Hall (5034); Oxford, OH
February 4, 2026; 7:00 p.m., ESPN+		Western Michigan	W 76–37	13–8 (7–4)	15 – Garnett	5 – Tied	3 – Moultrie	Convocation Center (643); Athens, OH
February 7, 2026*; 1:00 p.m., ESPN+		at Old Dominion; MAC–SBC Challenge	L 76–84	13–9	15 – Ranallo	7 – Garnett	4 – Tabeling	Convocation Center (738); Athens, OH
February 10, 2026; 7:00 p.m., ESPN+		at Toledo	W 71–67	14–9 (8–4)	17 – Tabeling	7 – Tabeling	4 – McWhorter	Savage Arena (3866); Toledo, OH
February 14, 2026; 1:00 p.m., ESPN+		Kent State	W 71–61	15–9 (9–4)	19 – Garnett	7 – McWhorter	5 – Tabeling	Convocation Center (654); Athens, OH
February 18, 2026; 6:00 p.m., ESPN+		at Akron	L 105–108 ^{2OT}	15–10	25 – Tabeling	10 – Garnett	4 – Tied	James A. Rhodes Arena (779); Akron, OH
February 25, 2026; 7:00 p.m., ESPN+		Bowling Green	L 56–60 ^{OT}	15–11 (9–6)	18 – Tabeling	11 – Tabeling	3 – Ranallo	Convocation Center (683); Athens, OH
February 28, 2026; 1:00 p.m., ESPN+		at Ball State	L 85–86	15–12 (9–7)	19 – Tabeling	7 – Baxter	6 – Tabeling	Worthen Arena (2015); Muncie, IN
March 4, 2026; 6:30 p.m., ESPN+		at Eastern Michigan	W 62–54	16–12 (10–7)	10 – Tied	10 – Garnett	2 – Tied	George Gervin GameAbove Center (1452); Ypsilanti, MI
March 7, 2026; 6:00 p.m., ESPNU		Miami (OH)	W 77–62	17–12 (11–7)	21 – Garnett	11 – Garnett	5 – Tabeling	Convocation Center (660); Athens, OH
MAC Tournament
March 11, 2026; 1:30 p.m., ESPN+	(5)	vs. (4) Central Michigan; Quarterfinals	W 89–88	18–12	33 – Tabeling	10 – Garnett	7 – Garnett	Rocket Arena; Cleveland, OH
March 13, 2026; 10:00 a.m., ESPN+	(5)	vs. (1) Miami (OH); Semifinals	L 52–80	18–13	18 – Williams	9 – Garnett	4 – Tabeling	Rocket Arena; Cleveland, OH
WNIT
March 19, 2026; 7:00 p.m.		UMBC; Round 1	L 58–62	18–14	14 – Tabeling	6 – Tied	2 – Tied	Convocation Center (551); Athens, OH
*Non-conference game. ^{#}Rankings from AP Poll. (#) Tournament seedings in parentheses. All times are in Eastern Time.

== Awards and honors ==
=== All-MAC Awards ===
Postseason All-MAC teams
Team	Player	Position	Year
All-MAC 2nd Team	Bailey Tabeling	G	Jr.
