= 2025–26 Radford Highlanders women's basketball team =

American college basketball season

2025–26 Radford Highlanders women's basketball
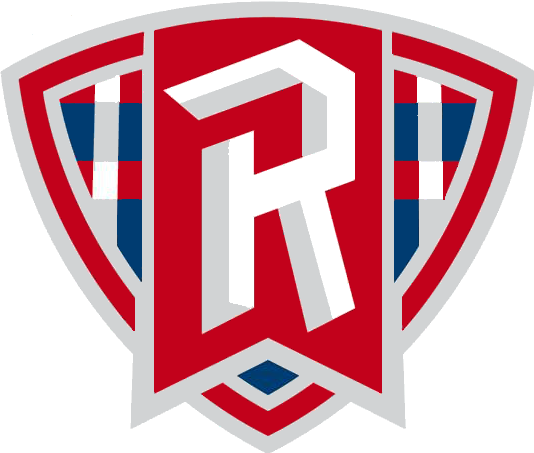

WNIT, Second Round
- Conference: Big South Conference
- Record: 23–13 (12–4 Big South)
- Head coach: Mike McGuire (13th season)
- Associate head coach: Jessica Jackson
- Assistant coaches: Alley Odell; Ben Edelburg; Joe Reid
- Home arena: Dedmon Center

2025–26 Big South women's basketball standings
	Conf.				Overall
Team	W		L	PCT	W		L	PCT
High Point †	13	–	3	.813	27	–	6	.818
Radford	12	–	4	.750	23	–	13	.639
Longwood	11	–	5	.688	21	–	10	.677
Gardner–Webb	9	–	7	.563	12	–	19	.387
Winthrop	7	–	9	.438	15	–	17	.469
UNC Asheville	7	–	9	.438	12	–	18	.400
Charleston Southern	6	–	10	.375	8	–	22	.267
USC Upstate	6	–	10	.375	12	–	20	.375
Presbyterian	1	–	15	.063	3	–	27	.100
† 2026 Big South tournament winner

The 2025–26 Radford Highlanders women's basketball team represents Radford University during the 2025–26 NCAA Division I women's basketball season. The Highlanders, led by 13th-year head coach Mike McGuire, play their home games at the Dedmon Center in Radford, Virginia, as members of the Big South Conference.

== Previous season ==
The Highlanders finished the 2024–25 season 14–17, 10–6 in Big South play, to finish in a tie for third place. They defeated Gardner–Webb, before falling to Longwood in the semifinals of the Big South tournament.

== Preseason ==
On October 15, 2025, the Big South Conference released their preseason poll. Radford was picked to finish third in the conference, with one first-place vote.

=== Preseason rankings ===
Big South Preseason Poll
Place	Team	Votes
1	High Point	77 (6)
2	Longwood	69 (1)
3	Radford	67 (1)
4	Winthrop	48
5	Charleston Southern	41
6	USC Upstate	33
7	Gardner–Webb	25
8	Presbyterian	23
9	UNC Asheville	22 (1)
(#) first-place votes

=== Preseason All-Big South Teams ===
Preseason All-Big South Teams
Team	Player	Year	Position
First	Joi Williams	Junior	Guard
First	Cate Carlson	Junior	Guard

== Roster ==
2025–26 Radford Highlanders women's basketball team
Players
Coaches

Pos.	#	Name	Height	Year	Previous school	Hometown
F	2	Anna Chacha	6 ft 2 in (1.88 m)	Fr	Mountain Mission School	Dodoma, Tanzania
G	4	Joi Williams	5 ft 6 in (1.68 m)	Jr	Virginia Academy	Leesburg, Virginia
G	5	Kirah Dandridge	5 ft 10 in (1.78 m)	Sr	St. Bonaventure	Richmond, Virginia
G	8	Cate Carlson	5 ft 10 in (1.78 m)	Jr	William & Mary	Virginia Beach, Virginia
G	11	Ava Sawi	5 ft 8 in (1.73 m)	So	Episcopal High School	Springfield, Virginia
C	14	Lindsee Williams	6 ft 4 in (1.93 m)	Fr	Minford High School	Lucasville, Ohio
G	15	Cherish Haywood	5 ft 10 in (1.78 m)	Fr	Mustang High School	Oklahoma City, Oklahoma
G	21	Adelyn Traylor-Walker	5 ft 6 in (1.68 m)	RS So	Franklin Community High School	Franklin, Indiana
F	22	Amanda Mitchell	6 ft 2 in (1.88 m)	Fr	Willow Spring High School	Fuquay-Varina, North Carolina
F	23	Georgia Simonsen	6 ft 1 in (1.85 m)	Fr	Robinson Secondary School	Fairfax, Virginia
F	24	Anna Stromberg	6 ft 3 in (1.91 m)	So	Legacy Christian Academy	Andover, Minnesota
G	32	Angelina Nice	6 ft 1 in (1.85 m)	So	Woodgrove High School	Round Hill, Virginia
G	33	Ellie Taylor	5 ft 10 in (1.78 m)	GS	Northern Kentucky	Bardstown, Kentucky
F	44	Anaiah Jenkins	6 ft 0 in (1.83 m)	Jr	Towson	Odenton, Maryland

Head coach

- Mike McGuire (Roanoke)

Assistant coach(es)

- Jessica Jackson (Western Carolina)
- Alley Odell (Concord)
- Ben Edelburg (UW–Stout)
- Joe Reid (New River CC)

Legend

- (C) Team captain
- (S) Suspended
- (I) Ineligible
- (W) Walk-on
- Injured
- Current redshirt

Roster
Last update: March 1, 2026

== Schedule and results ==
Date time, TV	Rank^{#}	Opponent^{#}	Result	Record	Site (attendance) city, state
Exhibition
October 28, 2025*; 7:00 pm		Lynchburg	W 93–37	–	Dedmon Center; Radford, VA
Non-conference regular season
November 3, 2025*; 5:00 pm, ACCNX		at Wake Forest	L 64–71	0–1	LJVM Coliseum (1,043); Winston-Salem, NC
November 6, 2025*; 10:00 am, ACCNX		at Georgia Tech	L 36–82	0–2	McCamish Pavilion (5,467); Atlanta, GA
November 8, 2025*; 4:00 pm, ESPN+		Emory & Henry	W 69–36	1–2	Dedmon Center (1,257); Radford, VA
November 11, 2025*; 11:00 am, ESPN+		Loyola (MD)	W 59–50	2–2	Dedmon Center (2,700); Radford, VA
November 16, 2025*; 2:00 pm, ACCNX		at Virginia	L 46−77	2−3	John Paul Jones Arena (3,754); Charlottesville, VA
November 19, 2025*; 7:00 pm, ESPN+		Furman	W 68−50	3−3	Dedmon Center (1,293); Radford, VA
November 22, 2025*; 2:00 pm, ESPN+		Niagara	W 80–58	4–3	Dedmon Center (1,078); Radford, VA
November 26, 2025*; 3:00 pm, YouTube		vs. Valparaiso; CSU Invitational	W 68–61	5–3	Woodling Gym (237); Cleveland, OH
November 28, 2025*; 4:00 pm, YouTube		vs. St. Bonaventure; CSU Invitational	L 45–55	5–4	Woodling Gym (354); Cleveland, OH
November 29, 2025*; 4:00 pm, ESPN+		at Cleveland State; CSU Invitational	L 59–62 ^{OT}	5–5	Woodling Gym (334); Cleveland, OH
December 4, 2025*; 6:00 pm, ESPN+		Navy	W 97–84 ^{2OT}	6–5	Dedmon Center (1,224); Radford, VA
December 13, 2025*; 3:00 pm, ESPN+		Ohio	L 67−72	6−6	Dedmon Center (629); Radford, VA
December 15, 2025*; 7:00 pm, ESPN+		Concord	W 100–48	7–6	Dedmon Center (561); Radford, VA
December 18, 2025*; 11:00 am, FloCollege		at Hampton	W 73–67 ^{OT}	8–6	Hampton Convocation Center (1,072); Hampton, VA
December 21, 2025*; 12:00 pm, ACCNX		at Virginia Tech	L 47–79	8–7	Cassell Coliseum (4,443); Blacksburg, VA
Big South regular season
December 31, 2025; 12:00 pm, ESPN+		at Presbyterian	W 75–32	9–7 (1–0)	Templeton Center (224); Clinton, SC
January 3, 2026; 2:00 pm, ESPN+		Charleston Southern	L 59–63	9–8 (1–1)	Dedmon Center (597); Radford, VA
January 10, 2026; 2:00 pm, ESPN+		at High Point	L 40–78	9–9 (1–2)	Qubein Center (1,613); High Point, NC
January 14, 2026; 7:00 pm, ESPN+		Gardner–Webb	W 53–38	10–9 (2–2)	Dedmon Center (572); Radford, VA
January 17, 2026; 2:00 pm, ESPN+		at Winthrop	W 67–65	11–9 (3–2)	Winthrop Coliseum (282); Rock Hill, SC
January 21, 2026; 7:00 pm, ESPN+		Longwood	W 78–63	12–9 (4–2)	Dedmon Center (591); Radford, VA
January 23, 2026; 4:30 pm, ESPN+		UNC Asheville	W 64–52	13–9 (5–2)	Dedmon Center (591); Radford, VA
January 28, 2026; 7:00 pm, ESPN+		at USC Upstate	W 67–29	14–9 (6–2)	G. B. Hodge Center (219); Spartanburg, SC
January 31, 2026; 12:00 pm, ESPN+		Winthrop	W 61–57	15–9 (7–2)	Dedmon Center (447); Radford, VA
February 4, 2026; 7:00 pm, ESPN+		at Longwood	L 73–88 ^{OT}	15–10 (7–3)	Joan Perry Brock Center (1,042); Farmville, VA
February 7, 2026; 2:00 pm, ESPN+		High Point	W 72–57	16–10 (8–3)	Dedmon Center (886); Radford, VA
February 11, 2026; 6:30 pm, ESPN+		at UNC Asheville	W 73–45	17–10 (9–3)	Kimmel Arena (373); Asheville, NC
February 18, 2026; 7:00 pm, ESPN+		USC Upstate	L 52–57	17–11 (9–4)	Dedmon Center (568); Radford, VA
February 21, 2026; 1:00 pm, ESPN+		at Charleston Southern	W 92–78	18–11 (10–4)	Buccaneer Field House (278); North Charleston, SC
February 25, 2026; 7:00 pm, ESPN+		Presbyterian	W 95–54	19–11 (11–4)	Dedmon Center (563); Radford, VA
February 28, 2026; 2:00 pm, ESPN+		at Gardner–Webb	W 65–59	20–11 (12–4)	Paul Porter Arena (379); Boiling Springs, NC
Big South tournament
March 5, 2026; 6:00 pm, ESPN+	(2)	vs. (7) Charleston Southern; Quarterfinals	W 86–67	21–11	Freedom Hall Civic Center; Johnson City, TN
March 7, 2026; 8:30 pm, ESPN+	(2)	vs. (3) Longwood; Semifinals	W 81–58	22–11	Freedom Hall Civic Center (1,661); Johnson City, TN
March 8, 2026; 6:00 pm, ESPN2	(2)	vs. (1) High Point; Championship	L 67–71	22–12	Freedom Hall Civic Center (1,366); Johnson City, TN
WNIT
March 20, 2026; 7:00 pm, ESPN+		Morehead State; First round	W 77–58	23–12	Dedmon Center (1,134); Radford, VA
March 23, 2026; 7:00 pm, ESPN+		at Arkansas State; Second round	L 52–83	23–13	First National Bank Arena (1,306); Jonesboro, AR
*Non-conference game. ^{#}Rankings from AP Poll. (#) Tournament seedings in parentheses. All times are in Eastern.
