= 2025–26 Presbyterian Blue Hose women's basketball team =

American college basketball season

2025–26 Presbyterian Blue Hose women's basketball
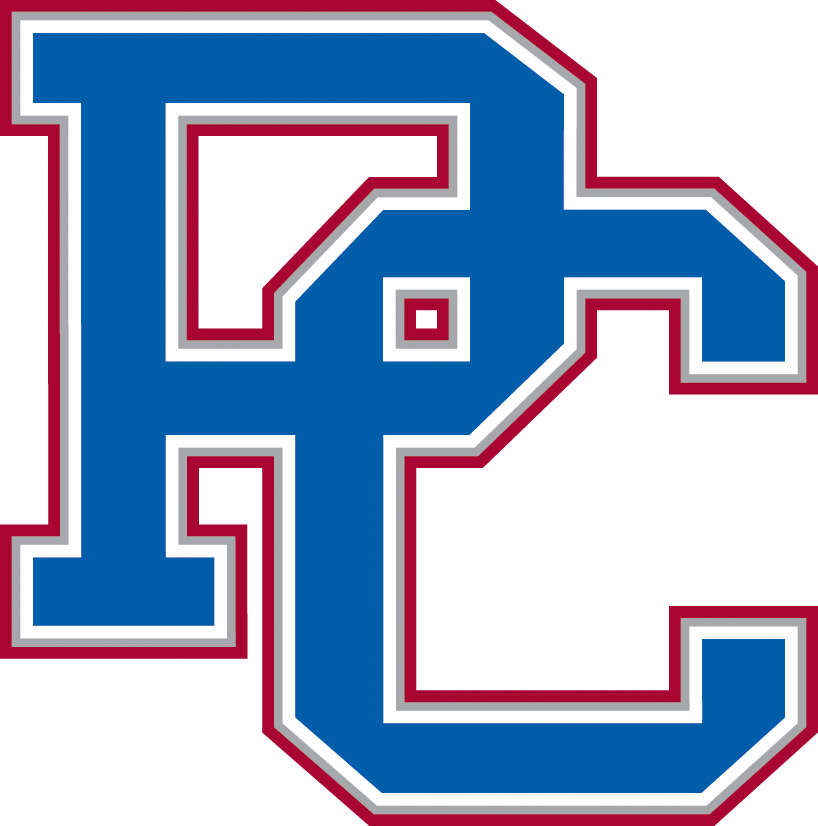
- Conference: Big South Conference
- Record: 3–27 (1–15 Big South)
- Head coach: Tiffany Sardin (2nd season)
- Assistant coaches: Ivey Slaughter; Elyse Kiploks; Martin Henry; Grant Raedle
- Home arena: Templeton Center

2025–26 Big South women's basketball standings
| | Conf. | | | | Overall |
| Team | W | | L | PCT | W | | L | PCT |
|---|---|---|---|---|---|---|---|---|
| High Point † | 13 | – | 3 | .813 | 27 | – | 6 | .818 |
| Radford | 12 | – | 4 | .750 | 23 | – | 13 | .639 |
| Longwood | 11 | – | 5 | .688 | 21 | – | 10 | .677 |
| Gardner–Webb | 9 | – | 7 | .563 | 12 | – | 19 | .387 |
| Winthrop | 7 | – | 9 | .438 | 15 | – | 17 | .469 |
| UNC Asheville | 7 | – | 9 | .438 | 12 | – | 18 | .400 |
| Charleston Southern | 6 | – | 10 | .375 | 8 | – | 22 | .267 |
| USC Upstate | 6 | – | 10 | .375 | 12 | – | 20 | .375 |
| Presbyterian | 1 | – | 15 | .063 | 3 | – | 27 | .100 |
† 2026 Big South tournament winner

The 2025–26 Presbyterian Blue Hose women's basketball team represented Presbyterian College during the 2025–26 NCAA Division I women's basketball season. The Blue Hose, led by second-year head coach Tiffany Sardin, played their home games at the Templeton Center in Clinton, South Carolina as members of the Big South Conference.

== Previous season ==
The Blue Hose finished the 2024–25 season 6–24, 4–12 in Big South play, to finish in eighth place. They were defeated by UNC Asheville in the first round of the Big South tournament.

== Preseason ==
On October 15, 2025, the Big South Conference released their preseason poll. Presbyterian was picked to finish eighth in the conference.

=== Preseason rankings ===
Big South Preseason Poll
| Place | Team | Votes |
|---|---|---|
| 1 | High Point | 77 (6) |
| 2 | Longwood | 69 (1) |
| 3 | Radford | 67 (1) |
| 4 | Winthrop | 48 |
| 5 | Charleston Southern | 41 |
| 6 | USC Upstate | 33 |
| 7 | Gardner–Webb | 25 |
| 8 | Presbyterian | 23 |
| 9 | UNC Asheville | 22 (1) |
(#) first-place votes

=== Preseason All-Big South Teams ===
No players were named to the First or Second Preseason All-Big South Teams.

== Roster ==
2025–26 Presbyterian Blue Hose women's basketball team
Players
Coaches

| Pos. | # | Name | Height | Year | Previous school | Hometown |
|---|---|---|---|---|---|---|
| G | 0 | Aminata Tal | 5 ft 8 in (1.73 m) | Sr | Shorter | Saint-Louis, Senegal |
| G | 1 | Ore Ogunwolere | 5 ft 5 in (1.65 m) | Jr | Union | Plainfield, New Jersey |
| G | 2 | Shelby Fiddler | 5 ft 9 in (1.75 m) | Sr | Niagara | Roanoke, Virginia |
| G | 4 | Morgan Boyd | 5 ft 9 in (1.75 m) | So | Highland Springs High School | Highland Springs, Virginia |
| G | 8 | Aretha Linger | 5 ft 10 in (1.78 m) | Fr | Orange Lions Academy | Rotterdam, Netherlands |
| G | 12 | Yolanda Floyd | 5 ft 8 in (1.73 m) | Fr | Hillgrove High School | Powder Springs, Georgia |
| G | 13 | Allie Sykes | 5 ft 3 in (1.6 m) | Fr | Western Alamance High School | Burlington, North Carolina |
| G | 15 | Ja'Cia Cunningham | 5 ft 9 in (1.75 m) | Sr | Chicago State | Milwaukee, Wisconsin |
| G | 21 | Daniella Velez | 5 ft 5 in (1.65 m) | So | Monsignor McClancy Memorial High School | Queens, New York |
| G | 23 | Krystal Haddock | 5 ft 10 in (1.78 m) | So | Tennessee State | Greenville, North Carolina |
| F | 25 | Samantha Mullock | 5 ft 11 in (1.8 m) | Fr | Nottingham Academy | Nottingham, England |
| F | 30 | Amani Williams | 6 ft 1 in (1.85 m) | Fr | Ben L. Smith High School | Greensboro, North Carolina |

Head coach

- Tiffany Sardin (Virginia)

Assistant coach(es)

- Ivey Slaughter (Florida State)
- Elyse Kiploks (Charleston Southern)
- Martin Henry (UIC)
- Grant Raedle (Loyola Chicago)

Legend

- (C) Team captain
- (S) Suspended
- (I) Ineligible
- (W) Walk-on
- Injured
- Current redshirt

Roster
Last update: March 9, 2026

== Schedule and results ==
| Date time, TV | Rank^{#} | Opponent^{#} | Result | Record | Site (attendance) city, state |
Non-conference regular season
| November 3, 2025*; 4:30 pm, ESPN+ | | Warren Wilson | W 113–45 | 1–0 | Templeton Center (125); Clinton, SC |
| November 6, 2025*; 6:00 pm, ACCNX | | at Wake Forest | L 41–78 | 1–1 | LJVM Coliseum (950); Winston-Salem, NC |
| November 10, 2025*; 11:00 am, FloCollege | | at Elon | L 48–93 | 1–2 | Schar Center (3,224); Elon, NC |
| November 14, 2025*; 6:00 pm, ESPN+ | | UNC Greensboro | L 53–57 | 1–3 | Templeton Center (103); Clinton, SC |
| November 17, 2025*; 11:00 am, ESPN+ | | Erskine | W 86–50 | 2–3 | Templeton Center (712); Clinton, SC |
| November 21, 2025*; 11:00 am, FloCollege | | at UNC Wilmington | L 55−75 | 2−4 | Trask Coliseum (2,893); Wilmington, NC |
| November 24, 2025*; 6:00 pm, ESPN+ | | at Coastal Carolina | L 38−87 | 2−5 | HTC Center (581); Conway, SC |
| November 28, 2025*; 1:30 pm, ESPN+ | | vs. Seattle; FIU Thanksgiving Classic | L 61–72 | 2–6 | Ocean Bank Convocation Center (36); Miami, FL |
| November 30, 2025*; 11:00 am, ESPN+ | | vs. UMBC; FIU Thanksgiving Classic | L 48–68 | 2–7 | Ocean Bank Convocation Center (40); Miami, FL |
| December 3, 2025*; 7:00 pm, ESPN+ | | at Furman | L 56–74 | 2–8 | Timmons Arena (185); Greenville, SC |
| December 10, 2025*; 6:00 pm, ACCNX | | at Virginia Tech | L 36–92 | 2–9 | Cassell Coliseum (3,716); Blacksburg, VA |
| December 19, 2025*; 6:00 pm, ESPN+ | | Eastern Kentucky | L 61–81 | 2–10 | Templeton Center (194); Clinton, SC |
| December 21, 2025*; 2:00 pm, ESPN+ | | Jacksonville State | L 39−74 | 2−11 | Templeton Center (194); Clinton, SC |
Big South regular season
| December 31, 2025; 12:00 pm, ESPN+ | | Radford | L 32–75 | 2–12 (0–1) | Templeton Center (224); Clinton, SC |
| January 3, 2026; 2:00 pm, ESPN+ | | at Longwood | L 56–89 | 2–13 (0–2) | Joan Perry Brock Center (862); Farmville, VA |
| January 7, 2026; 6:00 pm, ESPN+ | | High Point | L 43–76 | 2–14 (0–3) | Templeton Center (360); Clinton, SC |
| January 14, 2026; 7:00 pm, ESPN+ | | at USC Upstate | L 38–58 | 2–15 (0–4) | G. B. Hodge Center (287); Spartanburg, SC |
| January 17, 2026; 2:00 pm, ESPN+ | | UNC Asheville | L 53–64 | 2–16 (0–5) | Templeton Center (282); Clinton, SC |
| January 21, 2026; 7:00 pm, ESPN+ | | at Gardner–Webb | W 50–46 | 3–16 (1–5) | Paul Porter Arena (234); Boiling Springs, NC |
| January 23, 2026; 6:00 pm, ESPN+ | | Charleston Southern | L 73–77 | 3–17 (1–6) | Templeton Center (219); Clinton, SC |
| January 28, 2026; 6:00 pm, ESPN+ | | at Winthrop | L 42–74 | 3–18 (1–7) | Winthrop Coliseum (219); Rock Hill, SC |
| February 1, 2026; 2:00 pm, ESPN+ | | at High Point | L 41–70 | 3–19 (1–8) | Qubein Center (484); High Point, NC |
| February 4, 2026; 6:00 pm, ESPN+ | | USC Upstate | L 63–70 | 3–20 (1–9) | Templeton Center (220); Clinton, SC |
| February 7, 2026; 2:00 pm, ESPN+ | | at Charleston Southern | L 62–88 | 3–21 (1–10) | Buccaneer Field House (322); North Charleston, SC |
| February 14, 2026; 2:00 pm, ESPN+ | | Gardner–Webb | L 50–62 | 3–22 (1–11) | Templeton Center (287); Clinton, SC |
| February 18, 2026; 6:00 pm, ESPN+ | | Winthrop | L 59–72 | 3–23 (1–12) | Templeton Center (233); Clinton, SC |
| February 21, 2026; 2:00 pm, ESPN+ | | at UNC Asheville | L 58–76 | 3–24 (1–13) | Kimmel Arena (547); Asheville, NC |
| February 25, 2026; 7:00 pm, ESPN+ | | at Radford | L 54–95 | 3–25 (1–14) | Dedmon Center (563); Radford, VA |
| February 28, 2026; 2:00 pm, ESPN+ | | Longwood | L 57–89 | 3–26 (1–15) | Templeton Center (213); Clinton, SC |
Big South tournament
| March 4, 2026; 5:00 pm, ESPN+ | (9) | vs. (8) USC Upstate; First Round | L 48–60 | 3–27 | Freedom Hall Civic Center; Johnson City, TN |
*Non-conference game. ^{#}Rankings from AP Poll. (#) Tournament seedings in parentheses. All times are in Eastern.
