= Buffalo Bulls women's basketball =

2025–26 Buffalo Bulls women's basketball team
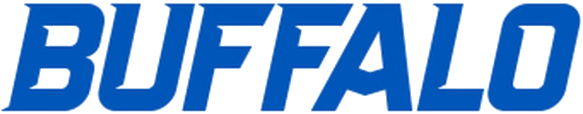
- University: University at Buffalo
- Head coach: Kristen Sharkey (1st season)
- Location: Buffalo, New York
- Arena: Alumni Arena (capacity: 6,100)
- Conference: Mid-American
- Nickname: Bulls
- Colors: Royal blue and white

NCAA Division I tournament Sweet Sixteen
- 2018

NCAA Division I tournament appearances
- 2016, 2018, 2019, 2022

Conference tournament champions
- MAC: 2016, 2019, 2022

Uniforms
Home	Away	Alternate

The Buffalo Bulls women's basketball team is the women's basketball team that represents the University at Buffalo in Buffalo, New York. The team currently competes in the East Division of the Mid-American Conference. The Bulls reached their first NCAA tournament in 2016 and, as of 2023, have appeared in four NCAA tournaments in total, including a Sweet Sixteen appearance in 2018.

== List of seasons ==
Through the 1996–97 season, the women's basketball teams were known as the Royals. The name was changed to the Bulls for the 1997–98 season.

Season	Record	Coach	Conference (Record)
1966–67	15–6	Brenda Bolay	n/a
1967–68	4–4	Ree Kay Spaeth	n/a
1968–69	7–3	Ree Kay Spaeth	n/a
1969–70	7–1	Ree Kay Spaeth	n/a
1970–71	6–5	Cynthia Anderson	n/a
1971–72	5–8	Cynthia Anderson	n/a
1972–73	[Records incomplete]	Cynthia Anderson	n/a
1973–74	[Records incomplete]	Carolyn Thomas	n/a
1974–75	4–7	Carolyn Thomas	n/a
1975–76	11–7	Carolyn Thomas	n/a
1976–77	7–9	Elizabeth Cousins	n/a
1977–78	12–8	Elizabeth Cousins	n/a
1978–79	4–16	Elizabeth Cousins	n/a
1979–80	8–10	Linda O’Donnell	n/a
1980–81	9–11	Linda O’Donnell	n/a
1981–82	12–12	Linda O’Donnell	n/a
1982–83	15–11	Linda O’Donnell	n/a
1983–84	8–13	Ed Muto	SUNYAC West (2–3)
1984–85	12–8	Ed Muto	SUNYAC West (8–2, 2nd)
1985–86	7–16	Nan Harvey	SUNYAC West (4–6)
1986–87	12–11	Nan Harvey	SUNYAC West (8–2, 1st)
1987–88	9–14	Nan Harvey	Mideast (5–6)
1988–89	15–13	Nan Harvey	Mideast (7–5)
1989–90	14–14	Nan Harvey	Mideast (6–6)
1990–91	16–11	Sal Buscaglia	Mideast (7–3)
1991–92	23–6	Sal Buscaglia	East Coast (10–2, 1st)
1992–93	13–13	Sal Buscaglia	n/a
1993–94	20–9	Sal Buscaglia	East Coast (4–2)
1994–95	20–8	Sal Buscaglia	Mid-Con (14–4, T-1st)
1995–96	23–8	Sal Buscaglia	Mid-Con (13–5, 2nd)
1996–97	22–6	Sal Buscaglia	Mid-Con (10–4, 3rd)
1997–98	18–10	Sal Buscaglia	Mid-Con (11–5, 3rd)
1998–99	15–12	Cheryl Dozier	MAC (8–8, 4th in East)
1999–00	18–11	Cheryl Dozier	MAC (7–9, T-4th in East)
2000–01	19–9	Cheryl Dozier	MAC (10–6, T-2nd in East)
2001–02	9–19	Cheryl Dozier	MAC (4–12, 6th in East)
2002–03	18–11	Cheryl Dozier	MAC (9–7, 3rd in East)
2003–04	6–21	Cheryl Dozier	MAC (4–12, 5th in East)
2004–05	4–24	Cheryl Dozier	MAC (2–14, 6th in East)
2005–06	10–18	Linda Hill-MacDonald	MAC (5–11, 3rd in East)
2006–07	10–19	Linda Hill-MacDonald	MAC (5–11, 5th in East)
2007–08	15–15	Linda Hill-MacDonald	MAC (8–8, 4th in East)
2008–09	8–24	Linda Hill-MacDonald	MAC (2–14, 6th in East)
2009–10	7–23	Linda Hill-MacDonald	MAC (3–3, 6th in East)
2010–11	16–16	Linda Hill-MacDonald	MAC (8–8, 3rd in East)
2011–12	9–22	Linda Hill-MacDonald	MAC (4–12, 6th in East)
2012–13	12–20	Felisha Legette-Jack	MAC (8–8, 4th in East)
2013–14	17–13	Felisha Legette-Jack	MAC (10–8, 3rd in East)
2014–15	19–13	Felisha Legette-Jack	MAC (11–7, 3rd in East)
2015–16	20–14	Felisha Legette-Jack	MAC (8–10, 3rd in East)
2016–17	22–10	Felisha Legette-Jack	MAC (10–8, 3rd in East)
2017–18	29–6	Felisha Legette-Jack	MAC (16–2, 1st in East)
2018–19	24–10	Felisha Legette-Jack	MAC (12–6, 3rd in East)
2019–20	19–12	Felisha Legette-Jack	MAC (9–9, 3rd in East)
2020–21	15–9	Felisha Legette-Jack	MAC (11–6, 4th in East)
2021–22	25–8	Felisha Legette-Jack	MAC (16–4, 2nd)
2022–23	12–16	Becky Burke	MAC (7–11, T-7th)
2023–24	19–14	Becky Burke	MAC (10–8, T-4th)
2024–25	30–7	Becky Burke	MAC (13–5, 2nd)

== Postseason appearances ==
=== NCAA Division I Tournament appearances ===
The Bulls have been to 4 NCAA Division I women's basketball tournaments. They achieved their highest seed in 2019 with a #10 seed. Their record is 3–4.

Year	Seed	Round	Opponent	Result
2016	#14	First Round	#3 Ohio State	L 69–88
2018	#11	First Round; Second Round; Sweet Sixteen	#6 South Florida #3 Florida State #2 South Carolina	W 102–79; W 86–65; L 63–79
2019	#10	First Round; Second Round	#7 Rutgers #2 Connecticut	W 82–71; L 72–84
2022	#13	First Round	#4 Tennessee	L 67–80

=== WNIT Tournament appearances ===
The Bulls have been to 3 WNIT women's basketball tournaments. In 2025, they defeated Troy to win the tournament.

Year	Round	Opponent	Result
2015	1st round	West Virginia	L 61–84
2024	1st round	Monmouth	L 53–68
2025	2nd round Super 16; Great 8 Semifinals; Finals	UMass; Southern Indiana; Rutgers; Cleveland State; Troy	W 84–82*; W 60–51; W 71–64; W 74–69; W 88–84
